= List of towns in Portugal =

A town (Portuguese: Vila) in Portugal, does not necessarily correspond to a municipality. There are 533 towns in Portugal. Some towns are the seat of municipality; others belong to a municipality. Alphabetically, the towns are as follows:

Source: Instituto Nacional de Estatística

== A ==
- A dos Cunhados
- A dos Francos
- Abragão
- Abraveses
- Aguada de Cima
- Águas Santas (in Maia Municipality)
- Aguiar da Beira
- Alandroal
- Albergaria-a-Velha
- Alcains
- Alcanena
- Alcanhões
- Alcantarilha, in Silves Municipality
- Alcobertas
- Alcochete
- Alcoutim
- Aldeia do Carvalho
- Alenquer
- Alfândega da Fé
- Alfarelos (Soure Municipality)
- Alfeizerão
- Algés, Oeiras Municipality
- Algoz
- Algueirão-Mem Martins, Sintra Municipality
- Alhadas
- Alhandra
- Alhos Vedros
- Alijó
- Aljezur
- Aljubarrota
- Aljustrel
- Almancil
- Almeida
- Almendra
- Almodôvar
- Almofala, Castro Daire Municipality
- Alpendurada
- Alpiarça
- Alter do Chão
- Alvaiázere
- Alvalade
- Alvite
- Alvito
- Alvor, Portimão
- Amareleja
- Amares
- Amiais de Baixo
- Ançã
- Angeja
- Anha
- Ansião
- Anta
- Apúlia
- Arazede
- Arco de Baúlhe
- Arcos de Valdevez
- Arcozelo
- Arganil
- Argoncilhe
- Argozelo
- Armação de Pêra
- Armamar
- Arouca
- Arraiolos
- Arranhó
- Arrifana
- Arronches
- Arruda dos Vinhos
- Avanca
- Aveiras de Cima
- Avelar
- Avintes
- Avis
- Avô
- Azambuja
- Azeitão
- Azueira

== B ==
- Baião
- Baixa da Banheira
- Barrancos
- Barrosas
- Barroselas
- Batalha
- Belas, Sintra
- Belmonte
- Benavente
- Benedita
- Benfica do Ribatejo
- Beringel
- Bobadela
- Boidobra
- Bombarral
- Borba
- Boticas
- Branca
- Brejos de Azeitão
- Britiande
- Brito
- Bucelas

== C ==
- Cabanas de Tavira
- Cabanas de Viriato
- Cabeceiras de Basto
- Cacia, Aveiro
- Cadaval
- Caldas das Taipas
- Caldas de S Jorge
- Caldelas
- Calheta, Madeira
- Camacha, Madeira
- Camarate
- Cambres
- Caminha
- Campelos
- Campo
- Campo de Besteiros
- Campo Maior
- Canas de Santa Maria
- Canas de Senhorim
- Caneças
- Canedo
- Canelas
- Caniçal
- Capelas
- Caramulo
- Caranguejeira
- Carapinheira
- Caria
- Carnaxide
- Carrazeda de Ansiães
- Carregado
- Carregal do Sal
- Carregosa
- Carrezedo de Montenegro
- Carvalhos
- Carvoeiro
- Cascais
- Castanheira de Pêra
- Castanheira do Ribatejo
- Castelo da Maia, Maia
- Castelo de Paiva
- Castelo de Vide
- Castro Daire
- Castro Marim
- Castro Verde
- Cavês
- Caxarias, Ourem
- Caxias, Oeiras
- Cedovim
- Ceira, Coimbra
- Cela
- Celorico da Beira
- Celorico de Basto
- Cercal do Alentejo
- Cernache do Bonjardim
- Cesar
- Chamusca
- Charneca da Caparica
- Cinfães
- Colares
- Condeixa-a-Nova
- Constância
- Corroios
- Cortegaça, Ovar
- Coruche
- Corvo, Azores
- Couço
- Crato
- Crestuma
- Cuba, Alentejo
- Cumieira
- Cepelos

== D ==
- Darque

== E ==
- Eixo
- Ermidas do Sado
- Ervedosa do Douro
- Escoural
- Espinhal
- Estômbar
- Estreito de Câmara de Lobos, Madeira

== F ==
- Fajões
- Famões
- Fânzeres
- Fão
- Favaios
- Fazendas de Almeirim
- Febres
- Fermentelos
- Fermil de Basto
- Ferragudo
- Ferreira do Alentejo
- Ferreira do Zêzere
- Ferro
- Figueira de Castelo Rodrigo
- Figueiró dos Vinhos
- Fontelo
- Fontes
- Forjães
- Fornos de Algodres
- Forte da Casa
- Foz do Arelho
- Frazão
- Freixianda
- Freixo de Espada à Cinta
- Freixo de Numão
- Fronteira
- Fuseta

== G ==
- Gaeiras
- Gandarela de Basto
- Gavião
- Glória do Ribatejo
- Góis
- Golegã
- Gonçalo, Amarante
- Grândola
- Grijó

== I ==
- Idanha-a-Nova
- Izeda

== J ==
- Joane
- Juncal

== L ==
- Lagares da Beira
- Lagoa, Azores (São Miguel Island)
- Lajeosa do Dão
- Lajes, Praia da Vitoria, Terceira island, Azores
- Lajes das Flores
- Lajes do Pico, Pico, Azores
- Lalim
- Lamas, Feira
- Lavra
- Lavradio
- Lazarim
- Leça da Palmeira
- Leça do Balio
- Leomil
- Lever, Gaia
- Linda-a-Velha, (Oeiras)
- Lobão, (Feira)
- Lordelo (Guimarães)
- Lordelo (Vila Real)
- Loriga, Seia
- Lorvão, Penacova
- Loureiro
- Louriçal
- Lourinhã
- Lousã
- Lousada
- Luso, Mealhada
- Luz (or Luz de Lagos), Algarve
- Luz de Tavira, Tavira, Algarve

== M ==
- Mação
- Maceda
- Maceira
- Macieira de Cambra
- Madalena (Madeira)
- Mafra
- Maiorca
- Malveira
- Manschestertown Green
- Manteigas
- Marialva
- Marinhais
- Marmeleira
- Marvão
- Melgaço
- Mértola
- Mesão Frio
- Mexilhoeira Grande
- Minde
- Mira
- Mira de Aire
- Miranda do Corvo
- Mões
- Mogadouro
- Moimenta da Beira
- Moita
- Moita dos Ferreiros
- Monção
- Moncarapacho
- Monchique
- Mondim da Beira
- Mondim de Basto
- Monforte
- Monsanto
- Montalegre
- Monte da Caparica
- Monte Gordo
- Monte Real
- Montemor-o-Velho
- Mora
- Moreira, Maia
- Moreira de Cónegos
- Mortágua
- Moscavide
- Mourão
- Mourisca
- Mozelos
- Murça
- Murtosa

== N ==
- Nazaré
- Nelas
- Nespereira
- Nisa
- Nogueira da Regedoura
- Nogueira do Cravo
- Nordeste, Azores

== O ==
- Óbidos
- Odeceixe
- Odemira
- Oeiras
- Oiã
- Oleiros
- Olival
- Olival Basto
- Oliveira de Frades
- Oliveirinha
- Ourique

== P ==
- Paço de Arcos, Oeiras
- Paço de Sousa
- Paços de Brandão
- Paião
- Palmela
- Pampilhosa
- Pampilhosa da Serra
- Paranhos da Beira
- Parchal
- Parede, Cascais
- Paredes de Coura
- Pataias
- Pedrario
- Pedras Salgadas
- Pedrógão Grande
- Pedroso
- Penacova
- Penalva do Castelo
- Penamacor
- Penedono
- Penela
- Pêra
- Pereira (formerly Pereira do Campo), Montemor-o-Velho
- Pêro Pinheiro, Sintra
- Perosinho
- Pevidém
- Pias
- Pinhal Novo
- Pinhão
- Pinheiro da Bemposta
- Ponta do Sol
- Ponte
- Ponte da Barca
- Ponte de Lima
- Pontével
- Pontinha
- Porches
- Portel
- Porto da Cruz
- Porto de Mós
- Porto Moniz (Madeira)
- Porto Salvo
- Póvoa de Lanhoso
- Póvoa de Santo Adrião
- Povoação (Azores)
- Prados
- Praia de Mira (Mira)
- Praia do Carvoeiro (Algarve)
- Proença-a-Nova

== Q ==
- Queijas
- Quinta do Conde
- Quinta Do Lago

== R ==
- Ramada
- Rebordões
- Redondo
- Resende
- Riachos
- Riba de Ave
- Ribamar
- Ribeira Brava
- Ribeira de Pena
- Ribeirão
- Rio de Moinhos
- Rio de Mouro
- Rio Meão
- Ronfe
- Rossas

== S ==
- Sabrosa
- Sagres
- Salir
- Salto
- Salvaterra de Magos
- Salzedas
- Sandim
- Sanfins do Douro
- Sangalhos, Anadia
- Santa Catarina
- Santa Catarina da Serra
- Santa Cruz da Graciosa [Azores]
- Santa Cruz da Trapa
- Santa Cruz das Flores [Azores]
- Santa Iria de Azoia
- Santa Luzia
- Santa Marinha (Seia)
- Santa Marinha do Zêzere
- Santa Marta de Penaguião
- Santar
- Santo André (Barreiro)
- Santo António dos Cavaleiros
- São Bartolomeu de Messines, Silves
- São Brás de Alportel
- São Cosmado
- São Félix da Marinha, Gaia
- São João da Pesqueira
- São João de Areias
- São João de Ovar, Ovar
- São João de Tarouca, Tarouca
- São João de Ver
- São João do Campo
- São João do Monte
- São Manços
- São Martinho de Anta, Alijo
- São Martinho de Mouros
- São Martinho do Campo (Campo),[Valongo]
- São Martinho do Porto
- São Miguel de Machede
- São Paio de Oleiros
- São Pedro da Cova
- São Pedro de Alva
- São Pedro de Castelões
- São Pedro de Rates
- São Pedro do Sul
- São Romão (Seia municipality)
- São Roque, Pico island, Azores
- São Teotónio
- São Tomé de Negrelos
- São Torcato
- São Vicente, Madeira island
- São Vicente de Alfena or Alfena(Valongo)
- Sardoal
- Sátão
- Seixo da Beira
- Sendim
- Sendim
- Senhora da Hora
- Sernancelhe
- Serra d'El-Rei
- Sertã
- Serzedelo
- Serzedo
- Sesimbra
- Sever do Vouga
- Silgueiros
- Silvares
- Sintra
- Soalheira
- Sobrado
- Sobral de Monte Agraço
- Sobralinho
- Sobreda
- Soure
- Sousel
- Souselas
- Souselo
- Souto, Abrantes
- Souto, Sabugal

== T ==
- Tábua
- Tabuaço
- Teixoso
- Tentúgal
- Termas do Gerês
- Terras do Bouro
- Tocha
- Torrão
- Torre de Dona Chama
- Torre de Moncorvo
- Torredeita
- Torreira
- Tortosendo
- Trafaria, Almada
- Tramagal
- Treixedo
- Trevões
- Turcifal
- Turquel

== U ==
- Unhais da Serra

== V ==
- Valadares
- Valado dos Frades
- Vale de Santarém
- Válega
- Vale Do Lobo
- Valença
- Velas
- Verride
- Vialonga
- Viana do Alentejo
- Vidago
- Vidigueira
- Vieira de Leiria
- Vieira do Minho
- Vila Chã de Ourique
- Vila Chã de São Roque
- Vila Cova à Coelheira
- Vila da Calheta
- Vila das Aves
- Vila de Cucujães
- Vila de Prado
- Vila de Rei
- Vila do Bispo
- Vila do Coronado
- Vila do Porto, Santa Maria Island, Azores
- Vila Flor
- Vila Franca das Naves, Trancoso (Beiras
- Vila Franca do Campo
- Vila Meã, Amarante
- Vila Nova da Barquinha
- Vila Nova da Rainha
- Vila Nova de Cacela
- Vila Nova de Cerveira
- Vila Nova de Milfontes
- Vila Nova de Oliveirinha
- Vila Nova de Paiva
- Vila Nova de Poiares
- Vila Nova de São Bento
- Vila Nova de Tazem (Gouveia)
- Vila Pouca de Aguiar
- Vila Praia de Âncora or Ancora, Caminha
- Vila Velha de Ródão
- Vila Verde
- Vila Viçosa
- Vilar de Maçada
- Vilar Formoso
- Vilarandelo
- Vimioso
- Vinhais
- Vouzela

== Z ==
- Zebreira

== See also ==
- Districts of Portugal
- List of cities in Portugal
- List of municipalities of Portugal
- Freguesias of Portugal
- List of Roman cities in Lusitania(Portugal)
