= Santa Marta de Penaguião Municipal Chamber =

Legislative body of Santa Marta de Penaguião

Coordinates: 41.21115°N 7.78704°W

Santa Marta de Penaguião Municipal Chamber Câmara Municipal de Santa Marta de Penaguião
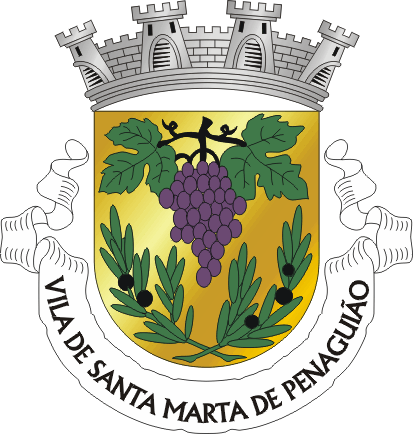
- Coat of arms of the town of Santa Marta de Penaguião

Type
- Type: Câmara municipal
- Term limits: 3

History
- Founded: 1202; 823 years ago

Leadership
- President: Luís Reguengo Machado, PS since 20 October 2021
- Vice President: Sílvia Fonseca Silva, PS since 20 October 2021

Structure
- Seats: 5
- Political groups: Municipal Executive (3) PS (3) Opposition (2) PSD (2)
- Length of term: Four years

Elections
- Last election: 26 September 2021
- Next election: Sometime between 22 September and 14 October 2025

Meeting place
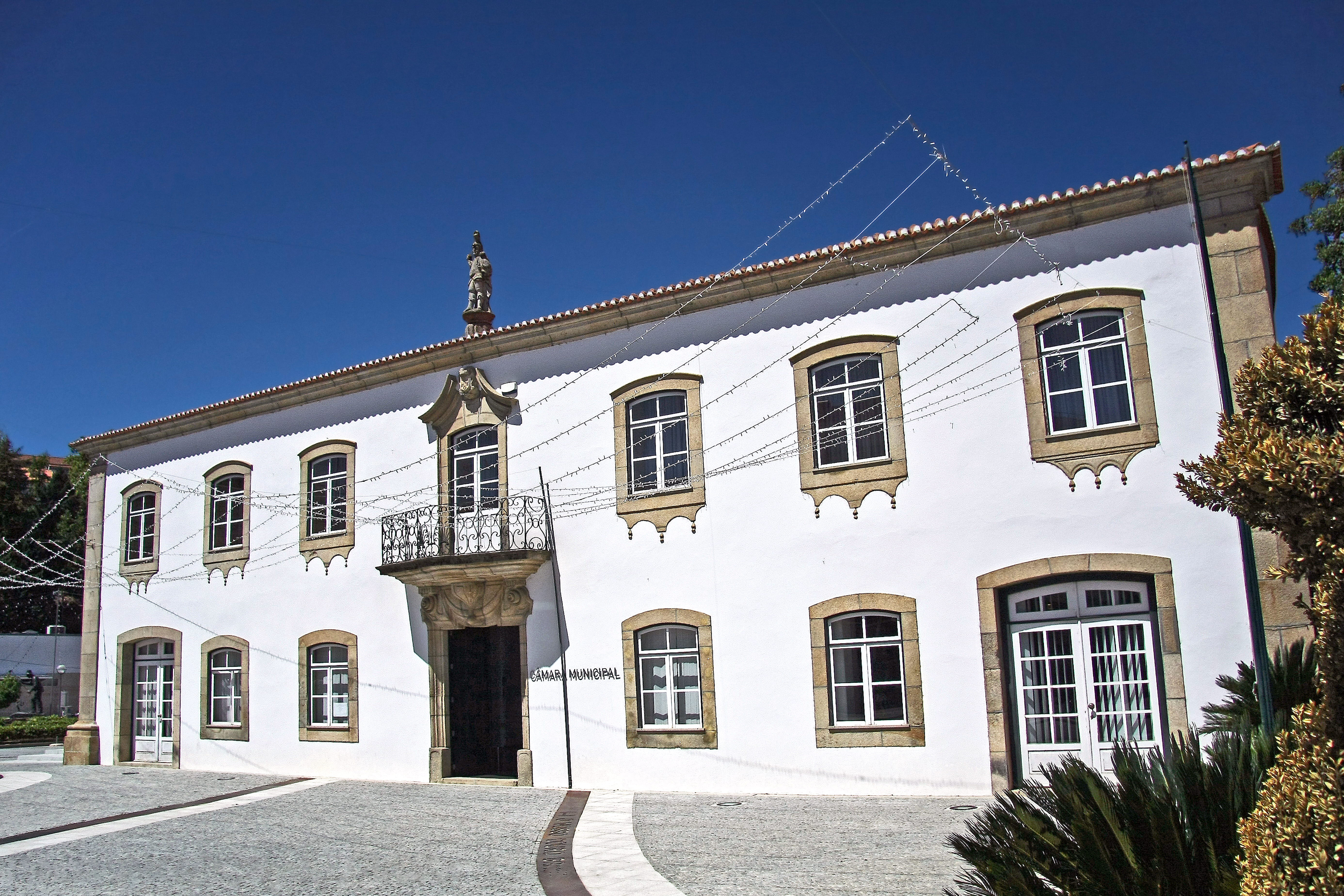
- Paços do Concelho de Santa Marta de Penaguião

Website
- www.cm-smpenaguiao.pt

The Santa Marta de Penaguião Municipal Chamber (Portuguese: Câmara Municipal de Santa Marta de Penaguião) is the administrative authority in the municipality of Santa Marta de Penaguião. It has 7 freguesias in its area of jurisdiction and is based in the town of Santa Marta de Penaguião, on the Vila Real District. These freguesias are: Alvações do Corgo; Cumieira; Fontes; Lobrigos (São Miguel e São João Baptista) e Sanhoane; Louredo e Fornelos; Medrões and Sever.

The Santa Marta de Penaguião City Council is made up of 5 councillors, representing, currently, two different political forces. The first candidate on the list with the most votes in a municipal election or, in the event of a vacancy, the next candidate on the list, takes office as President of the Municipal Chamber.

== List of the Presidents of the Municipal Chamber of Santa Marta de Penaguião ==
- Manuel Alves Dias – (1976–1985)
- Artur Lourenço Vaz – (1985–1995)
- Francisco Guedes Ribeiro – (1995–2013)
- Luís Reguengo Machado – (2013–2025)

(The list is incomplete)
