= Santarém, Portugal =

Santarém
- Municipality
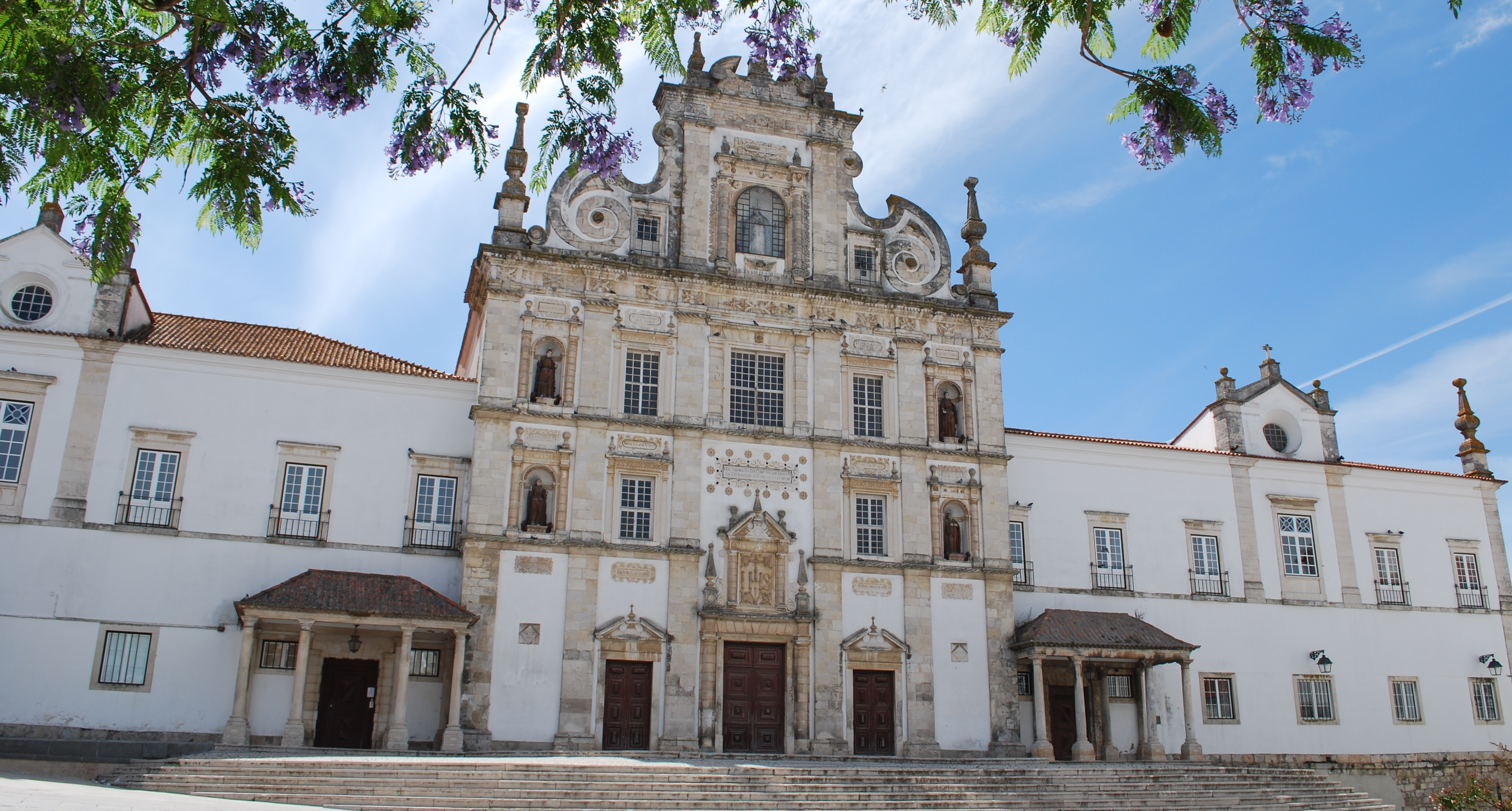
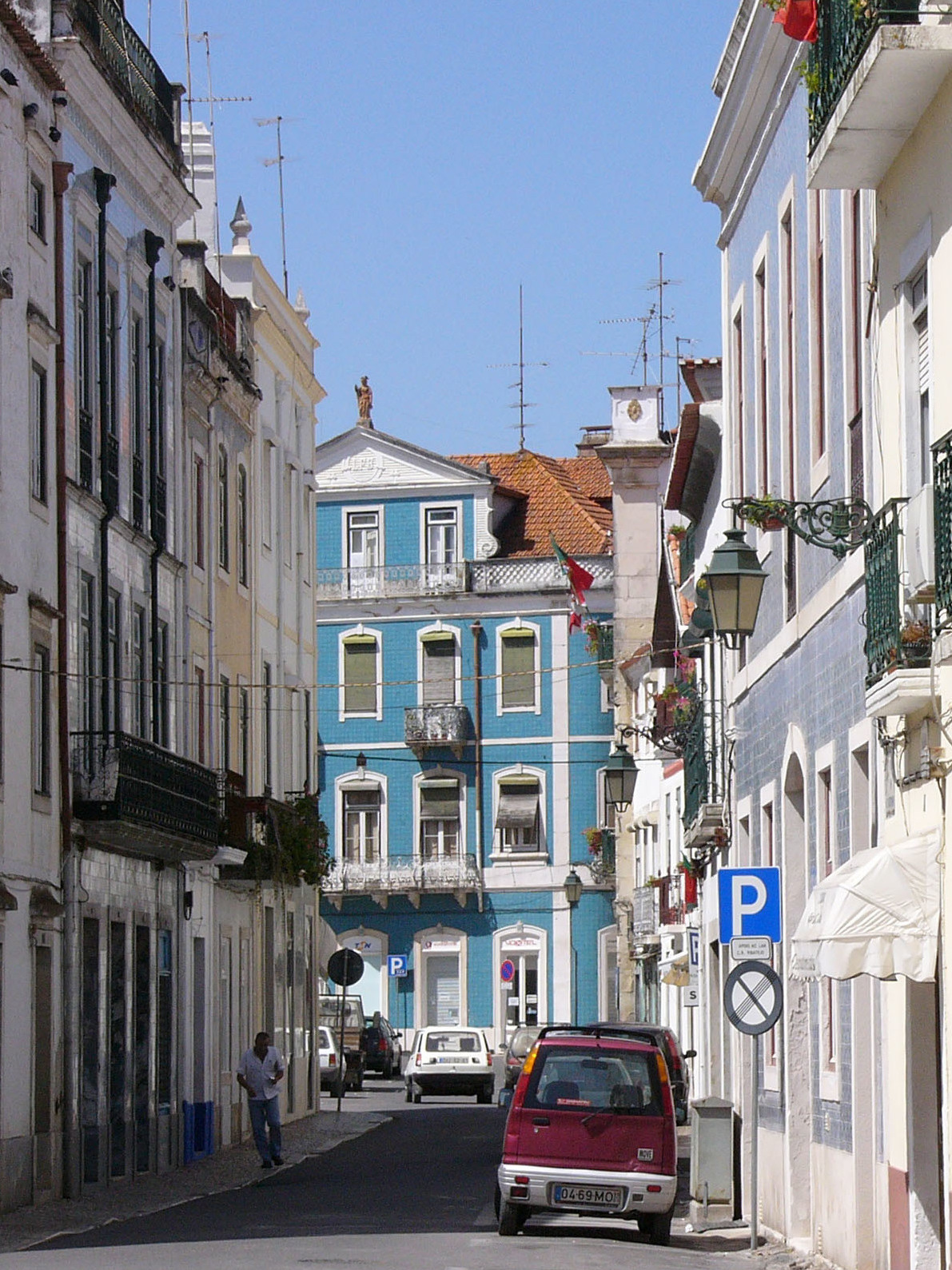
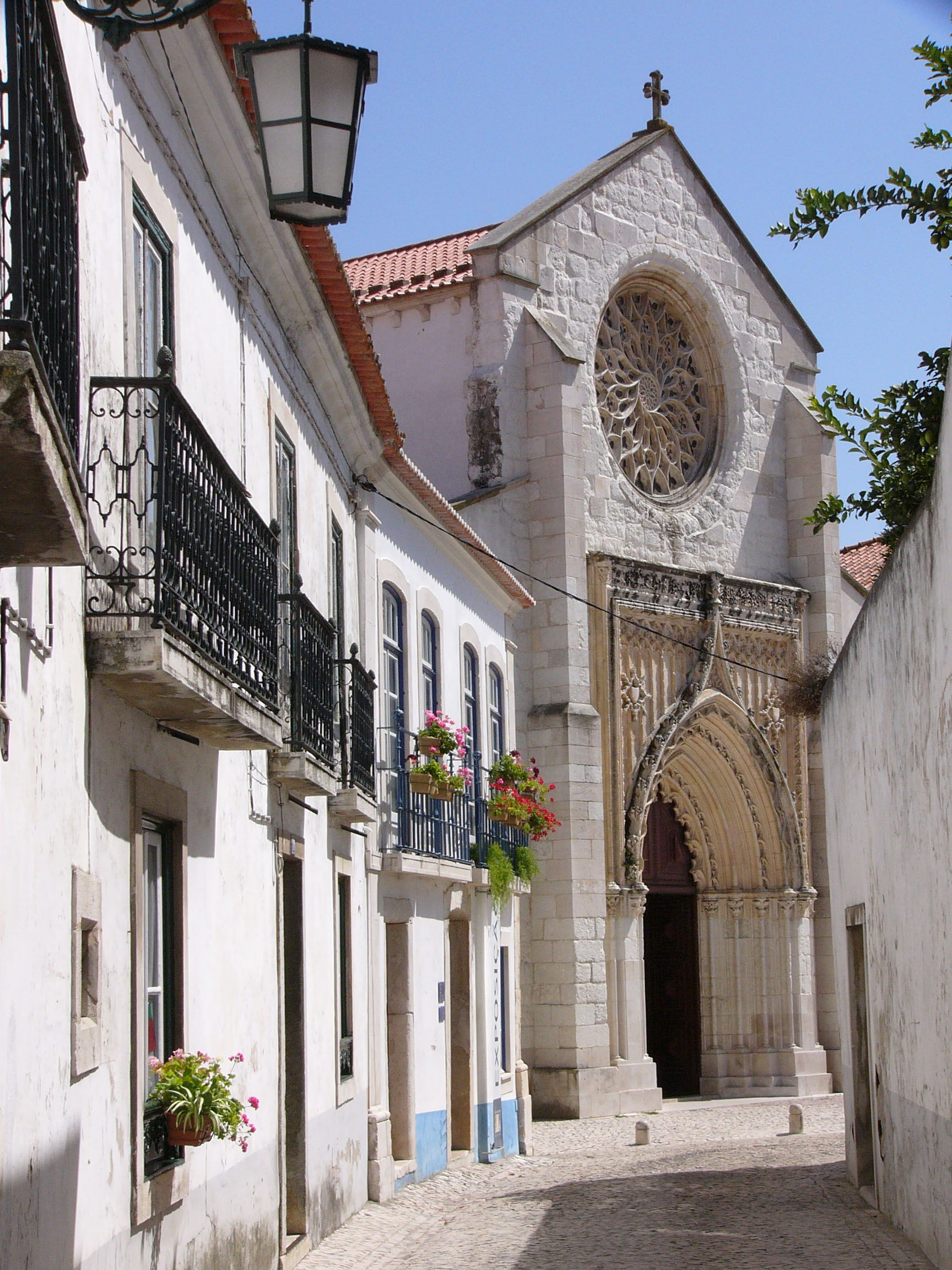
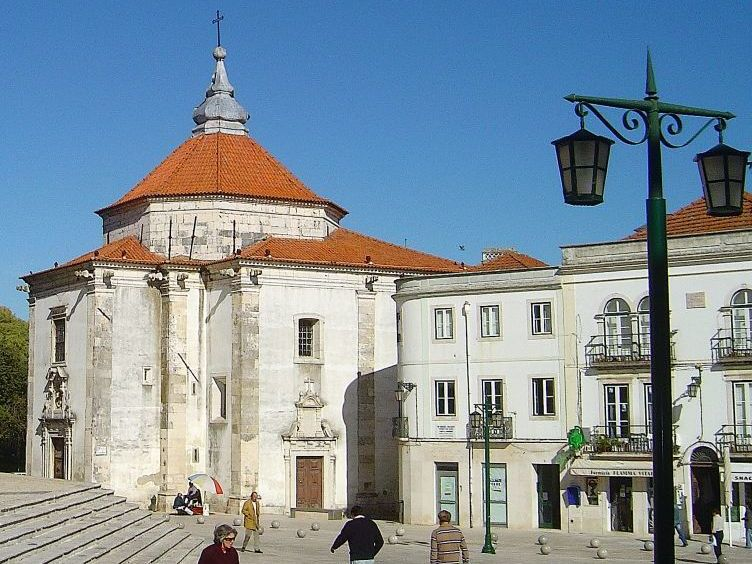
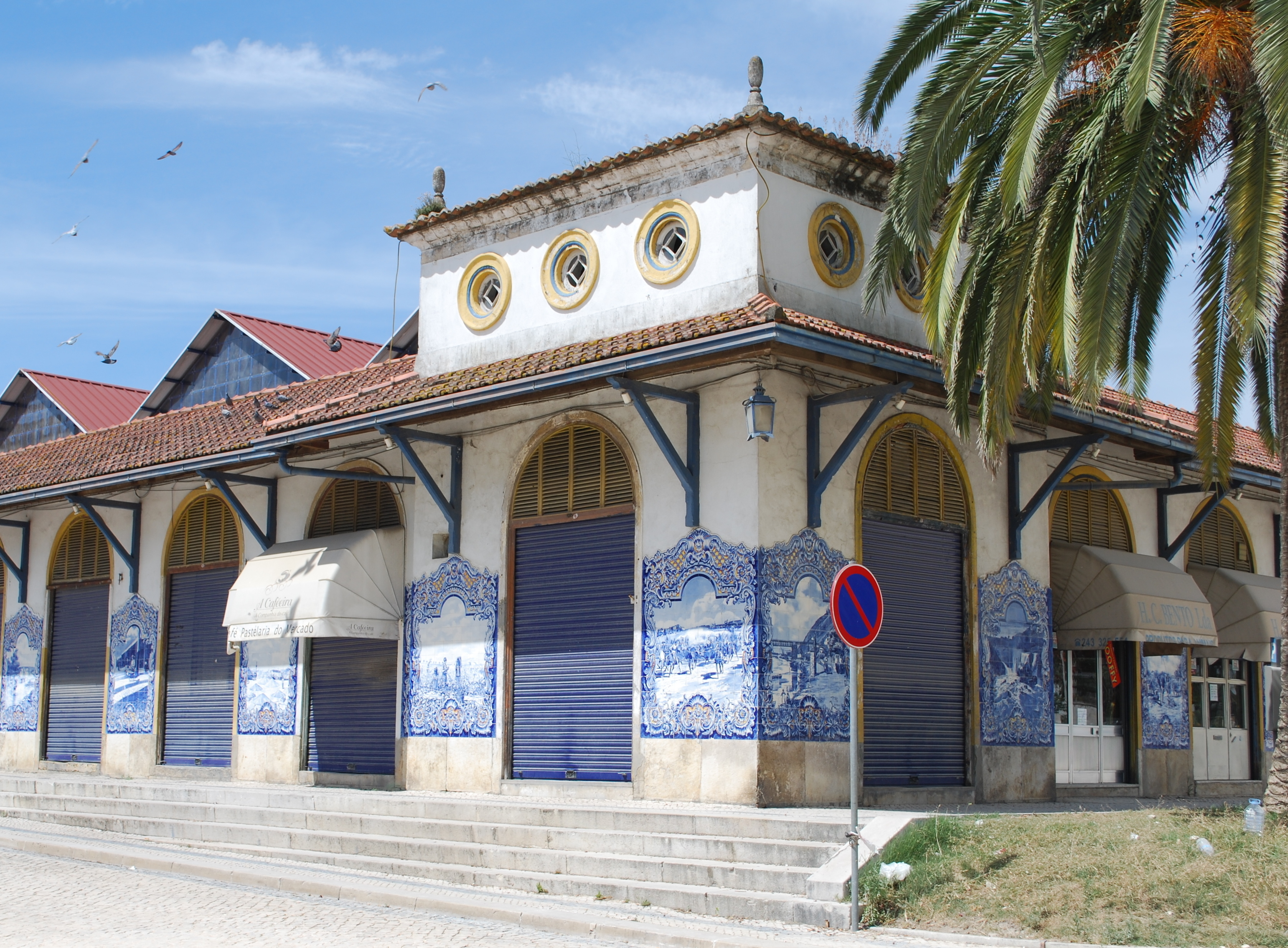
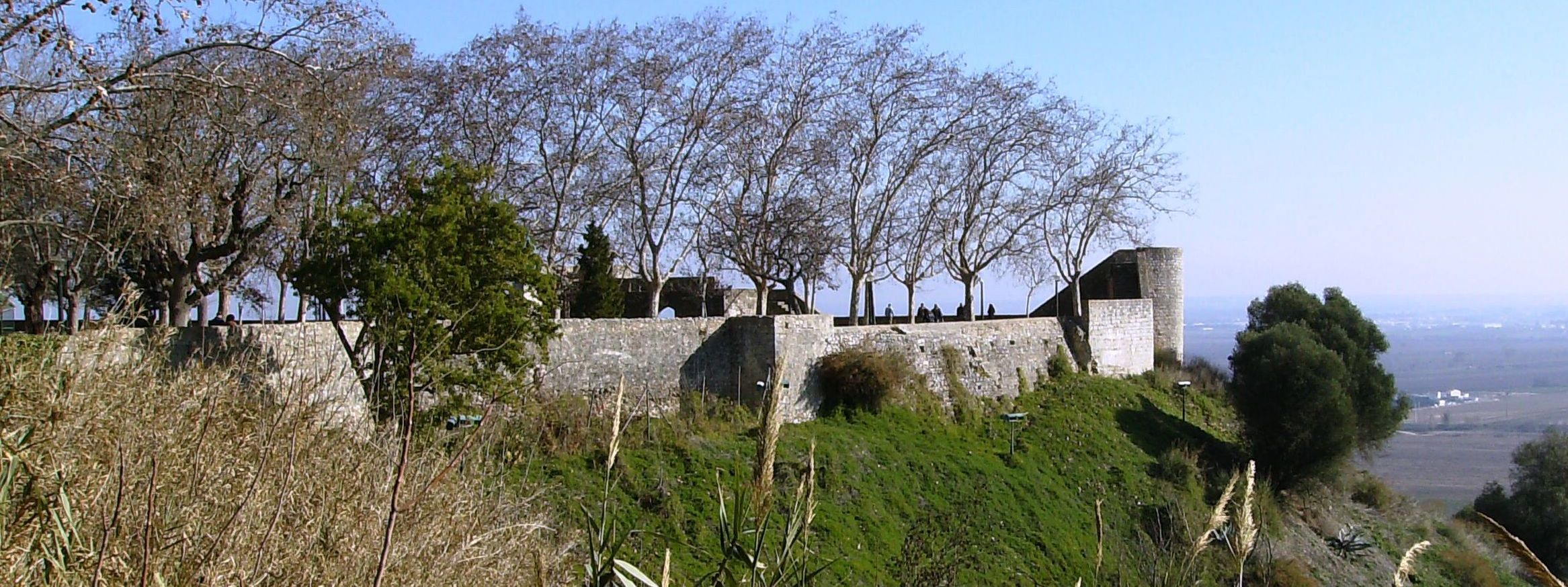
- Seminary Church, Street, Graça Church, Square, Municipal market, Walls of the Santarém Castle

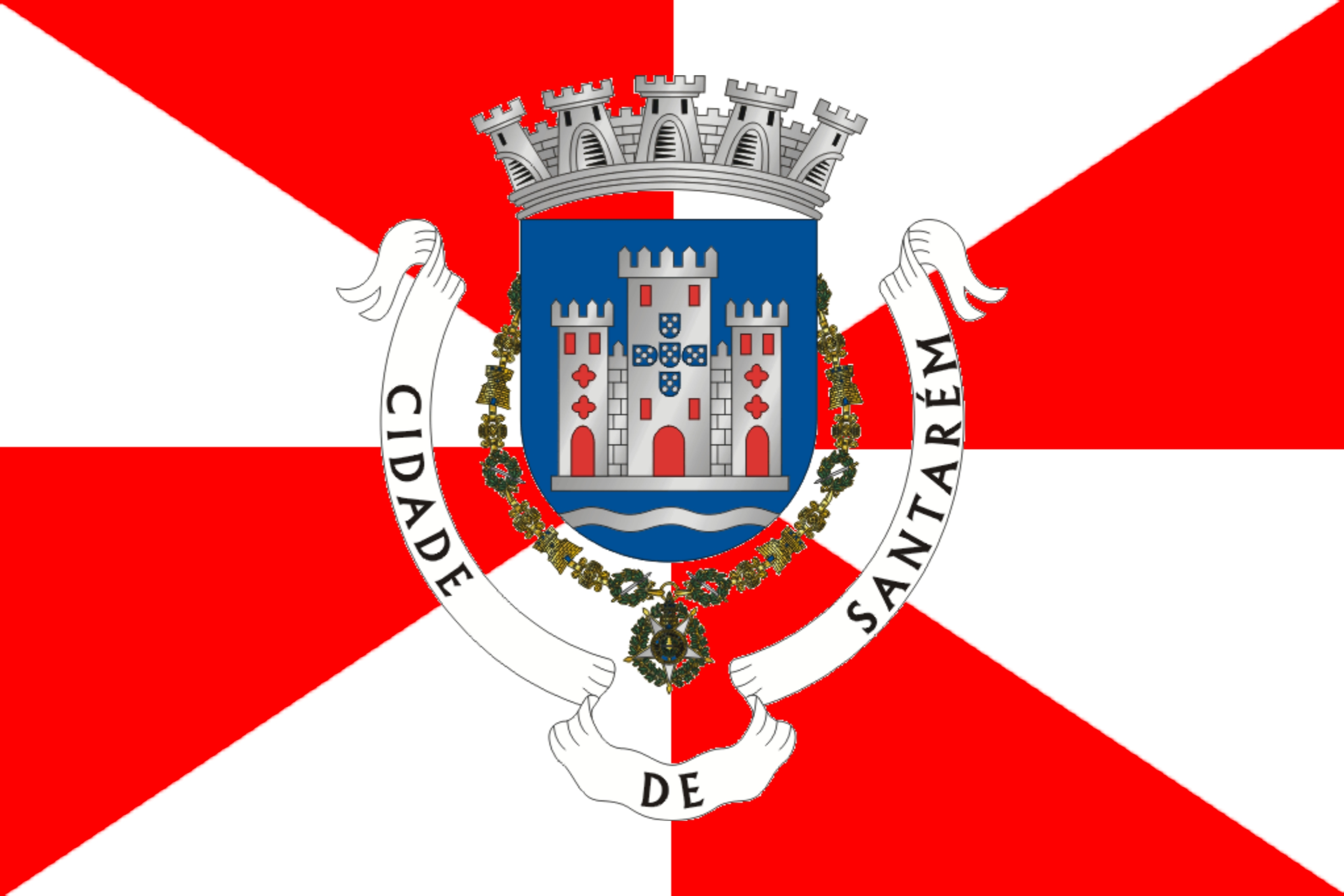
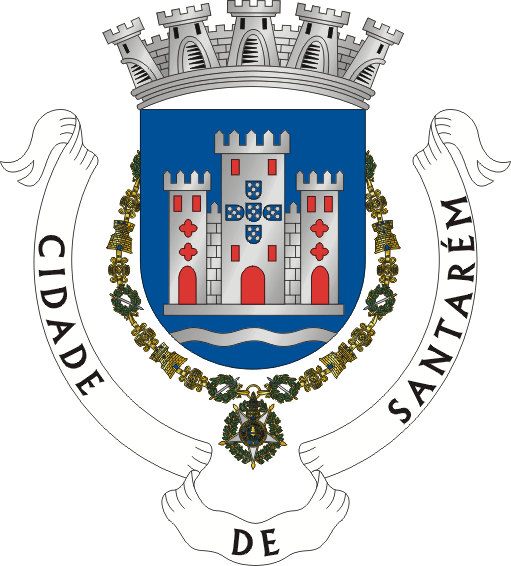
- Flag Coat of arms
- Interactive map of Santarém
- Coordinates: 39°14′02″N 08°41′10″W
- Country: Portugal
- Region: Oeste e Vale do Tejo
- Intermunic. comm.: Lezíria do Tejo
- District: Santarém
- Parishes: 18

Government
  - President: João Teixeira Leite (PSD)

Area
  - Total: 552.54 km^{2} (213.34 sq mi)

Population (2021)
  - Total: 58,671
  - Density: 106.18/km^{2} (275.02/sq mi)
- Time zone: UTC+00:00 (WET)
  - Summer (DST): UTC+01:00 (WEST)
- Local holiday: March 19
- Website: www.cm-santarem.pt

Santarém (European Portuguese pronunciation: [sɐ̃tɐˈɾɐ̃j]) is a Portuguese city and municipality located in the district of Santarém. The population of the historic Ribatejo capital in 2021 was 58,671, in an area of 552.54 km^{2}. The population of the city proper was 29,929 in 2012.

The mayor is João Teixeira Leite (PSD). The municipal holiday is March 19, the day of Saint Joseph (São José). The city is on the Portuguese Way variant of the Way of Saint James.

== History ==
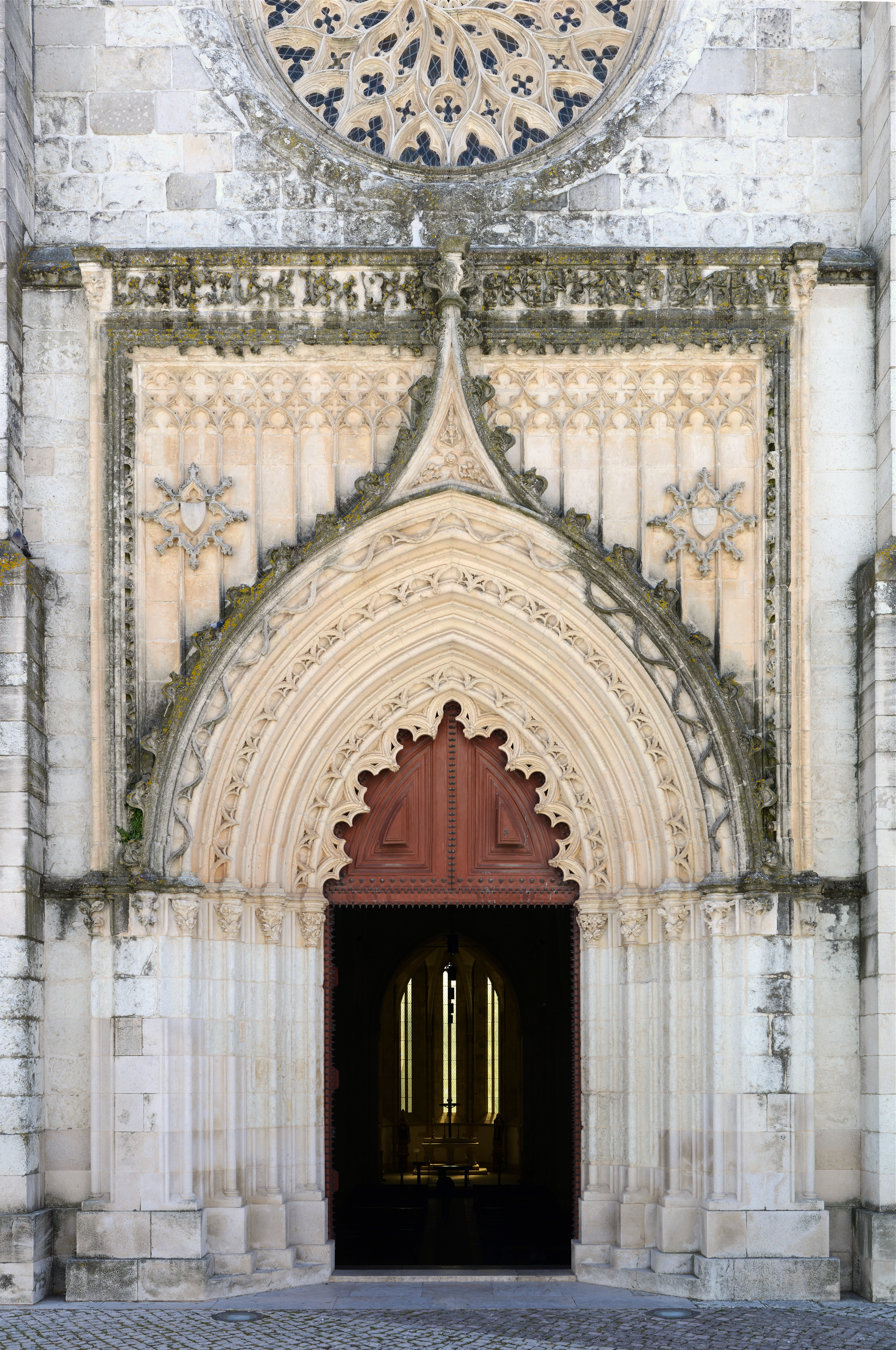
Main portal of Igreja da Graça

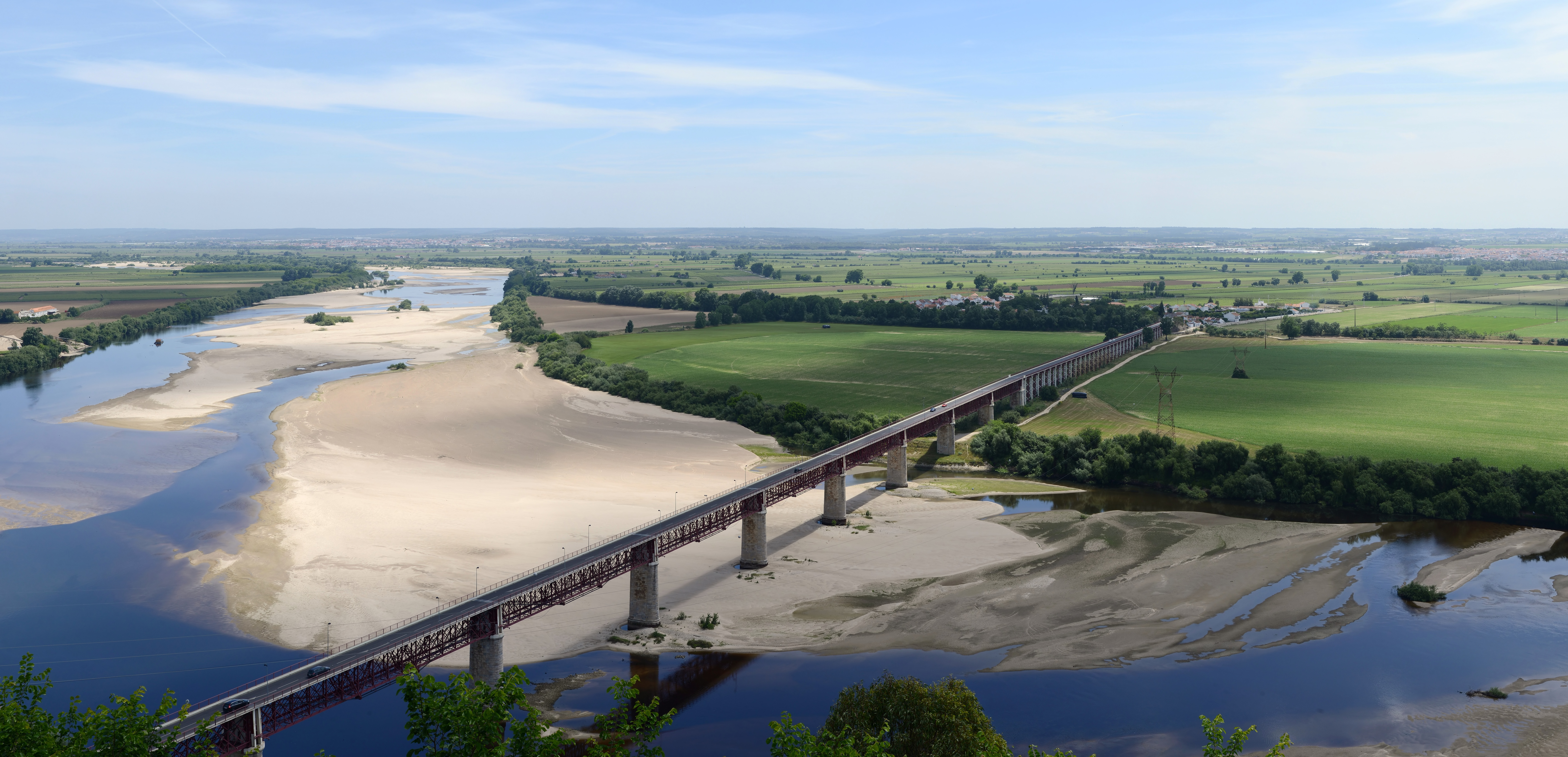
The Tagus River as seen from Portas do Sol

Since prehistory, the region of Santarém has been inhabited, first by the Lusitani people and then by the Greeks, Romans, Visigoths, Arabs and later Portuguese Christians. Of the various legends related to the foundation of Santarém, the most famous tells of the Visigoth Saint Iria (or Irene), who was martyred in Tomar (Nabantia) and whose uncorrupted body reached Santarém. In her honour, the name of the town (then known by its Latin name Scalabis) would later be changed to Sancta Irene, from which Santarém would eventually be derived.

The foundation of the city is attributed to the Romans, who occupied the region in the 2nd century BC and named the city Scalabis. During the Roman period Scalabis was an important commercial post in the mid-Tagus region and was the administrative capital of one of the regions (Conventus Scalabitanus) of Lusitania. Julius Caesar ordered the creation of a military camp in Santarém in 61 BC. The city takes at this time the designation of Scallabis Praesidium Iulium.

The 3rd century crisis and the decline of the Western Roman Empire affected the civitas and in the 5th century the town was conquered by Germanic tribes (Vandals and Alans). In 460, the Visigoths, led by Sunerico, conquered the city and expelled the Alans.

It was probably in the late period of Visigoth domination when the city took a new name after the local martyr Santa Irene, whose remains were credited to have been found near the Tagus. In any case, when the city was taken in the 8th century by the Arabs, they named it Shantarin, as a proof that the old Roman name had already been forgotten. Under the rule of the Arabs the city became an important cultural centre. Important Arab personalities born in Santarém include the poet and historian Ibn Bassam (died 1147) and the poet Ibn Sara (1043–1123).

The period of Arabic domination was finished in 1147 by the first King of Portugal, Afonso Henriques, who conquered the city on March 15. According to period chronicles, the King and a small army managed to take the city after some men climbed the walls during the night and opened the gates. The story of the conquest of Santarém is told in a heroic tone in the medieval chronicle De expugnatione Scalabis, which celebrates and justifies the power of the first Portuguese King. From a military point of view, the conquest of Santarém and, in that same year, of Lisbon were crucial steps in the Reconquista of Portugal.

The most notable Almohad ruler, Abu Yaqub Yusuf (patron of Averroes and Ibn Tufail), died in Santarém while trying to recapture it during the siege of 1184.

After the reconquest of Santarém, the city was frequently visited by the successive monarchs and many feudal parliaments (Cortes) were held in Santarém. King Fernando I, in particular, was very fond of the city and chose to be buried in the Convent of Saint Francis (Convento de São Francisco). His tomb is now in the Carmo Museum in Lisbon. The city was one of the most important in medieval Portugal, as attested by its large number of monasteries and its royal palace (no longer in existence but was located where the cathedral currently stands). There are still enough examples of Gothic buildings in the city for it to be known as the "Capital of the Portuguese Gothic".

In the 15th century, during the period of Portuguese discoveries, expeditions like the conquest of Ceuta (1415) were planned in the royal palace of Santarém. Many important personalities related to this historical time are buried in the churches of Santarém. Pedro de Meneses, first governor of Ceuta (1415–1437) after the Portuguese conquest, is buried in a magnificent Gothic tomb in the Church of the Grace (Igreja da Graça). In the same church is also buried Pedro Álvares Cabral, the navigator that discovered Brazil in 1500.

The city was hit by earthquakes twice: one in 1531 and the other in 1755, which damaged the city and many historical monuments were lost. During the Napoleonic invasions in the early 19th century the city was invaded and pillaged.

In the second half of the 19th century many improvements reached Santarém, like running water, gas light, the building of a bridge over the Tagus and the railway in 1861. In the 20th century, the infrastructure of the city (education, housing, commerce) continued to improve and the economy of the city remained mainly dedicated to the production of agricultural goods.

== Geography ==
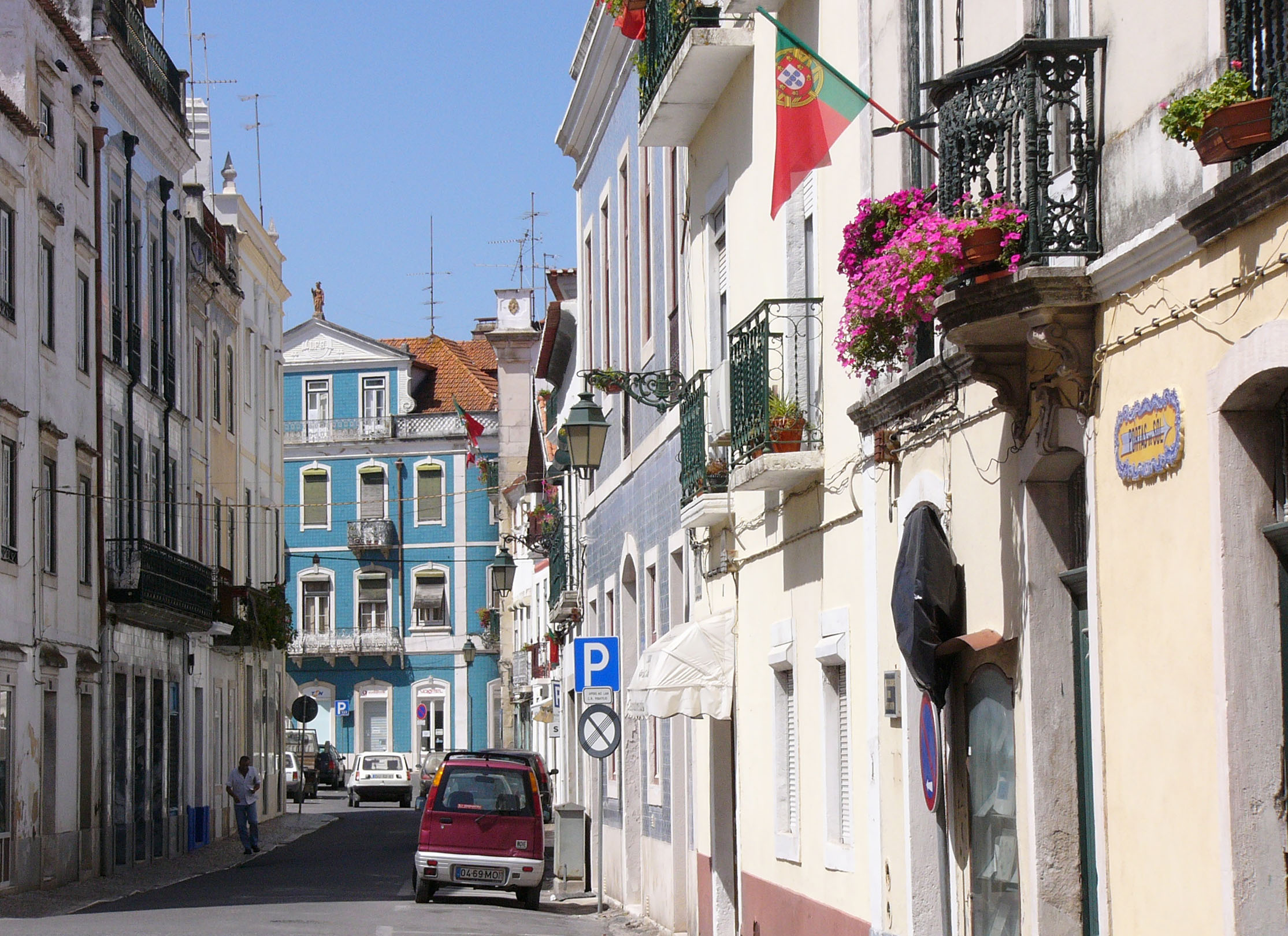
Cityscape of Santarém

=== Physical geography ===
The city of Santarém stands is situated on a plateau, located on the right bank of the Tagus River 65 kilometres (40 mi) northeast from Lisbon.

=== Climate ===
Santarém has a Mediterranean climate (Köppen: Csa) with mild, humid, rainy winters with temperatures averaging 15 to 16 °C (59 to 61 °F) during the day and 6 to 7 °C (43 to 45 °F) at night, occasionally dropping below 0 °C (32 °F), with an average of 15 days with frost per year; and hot, dry summers with temperatures ranging between 29 and 31 °C (84 and 88 °F) during the day and 15 and 16 °C (59 and 61 °F) at night. The global annual temperature averages 23 °C (73 °F) during the day and 11 °C (52 °F) at night.

On August 7, 2023, the temperature in Santarém reached an all-time recorded high for the city of 46.4 °C (115.5 °F). It was also the highest temperature recorded in the country in 2023 up to that day.

Climate data for Santarém, 1991-2020 normals, 1971-present extremes
Month	Jan	Feb	Mar	Apr	May	Jun	Jul	Aug	Sep	Oct	Nov	Dec	Year
Record high °C (°F)	25.2 (77.4)	29.0 (84.2)	33.0 (91.4)	36.3 (97.3)	38.3 (100.9)	43.9 (111.0)	46.2 (115.2)	46.4 (115.5)	42.5 (108.5)	37.8 (100.0)	28.5 (83.3)	24.5 (76.1)	46.4 (115.5)
Mean daily maximum °C (°F)	14.8 (58.6)	16.6 (61.9)	19.6 (67.3)	21.2 (70.2)	24.6 (76.3)	28.3 (82.9)	30.8 (87.4)	31.5 (88.7)	29.0 (84.2)	23.9 (75.0)	18.1 (64.6)	15.3 (59.5)	22.8 (73.1)
Daily mean °C (°F)	10.3 (50.5)	11.5 (52.7)	14.1 (57.4)	15.7 (60.3)	18.5 (65.3)	21.5 (70.7)	23.6 (74.5)	24.1 (75.4)	22.2 (72.0)	18.5 (65.3)	13.8 (56.8)	11.1 (52.0)	17.1 (62.7)
Mean daily minimum °C (°F)	5.8 (42.4)	6.5 (43.7)	8.6 (47.5)	10.1 (50.2)	12.4 (54.3)	14.8 (58.6)	16.4 (61.5)	16.7 (62.1)	15.4 (59.7)	13.1 (55.6)	9.4 (48.9)	7.0 (44.6)	11.4 (52.4)
Record low °C (°F)	−4.0 (24.8)	−2.4 (27.7)	−2.0 (28.4)	1.4 (34.5)	5.5 (41.9)	7.5 (45.5)	10.7 (51.3)	10.5 (50.9)	9.0 (48.2)	3.5 (38.3)	0.0 (32.0)	−3.1 (26.4)	−4.0 (24.8)
Average precipitation mm (inches)	80.3 (3.16)	54.4 (2.14)	55.6 (2.19)	57.2 (2.25)	44.8 (1.76)	16.3 (0.64)	3.3 (0.13)	5.3 (0.21)	25.2 (0.99)	89.5 (3.52)	95.4 (3.76)	80.8 (3.18)	608.1 (23.93)
Average precipitation days (≥ 1 mm)	10.0	7.3	7.2	8.0	5.8	2.4	0.7	1.3	3.2	8.8	9.6	9.1	73.4
Mean monthly sunshine hours	141.3	137.9	196.3	211.9	274.8	295.7	338.6	331.3	243.3	196.2	149.8	131.8	2,648.9
Source: Instituto Português do Mar e da Atmosfera (Sunshine hours only recorded in 1972–1976 and 1981–1990)

=== Parishes ===
Administratively, the municipality is divided into 18 civil parishes (freguesias):

- Abitureiras
- Abrã
- Achete, Azoia de Baixo e Póvoa de Santarém
- Alcanede
- Alcanhões
- Almoster
- Amiais de Baixo
- Arneiro das Milhariças
- Azoia de Cima e Tremês
- Casével e Vaqueiros
- Gançaria
- Moçarria
- Pernes
- Póvoa da Isenta
- Romeira e Várzea
- Santarém (Marvila), Santa Iria da Ribeira de Santarém, Santarém (São Salvador) e Santarém (São Nicolau)
- São Vicente do Paul e Vale de Figueira
- Vale de Santarém

== Twin towns and sister cities ==
Santarém is twinned with:

- Badajoz, Spain
- Brava, Cape Verde
- Covilhã, Portugal
- Fulacunda, Guinea-Bissau
- Grândola, Portugal
- Lubango, Angola
- Meknes, Morocco
- Santarém, Brazil
- São Vicente, Brazil
- Târgoviște, Romania
- Tiraspol, Moldova

== Architecture ==
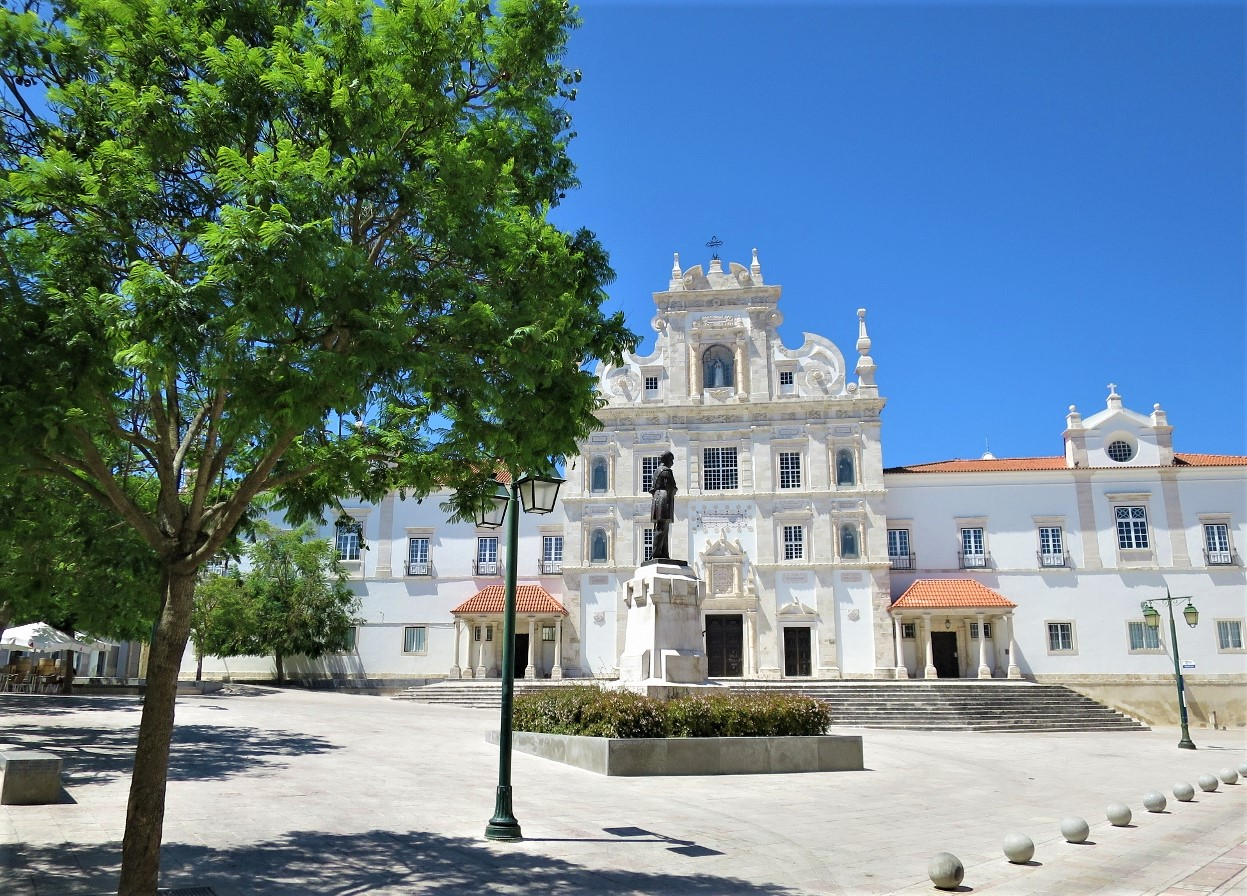
Central square with the cathedral.

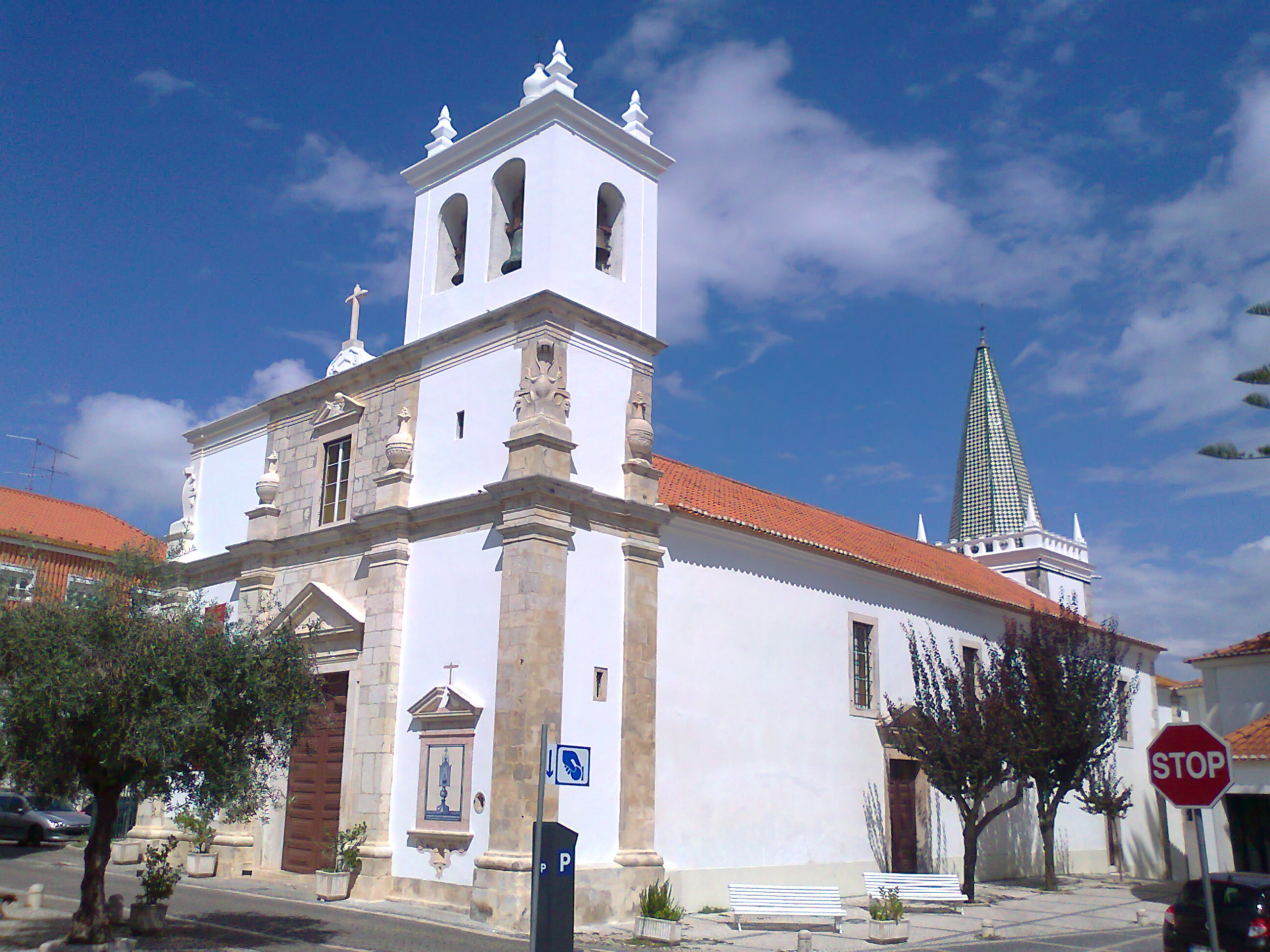
The Church of Saint Stephen (known as the Sanctuary of the Most Holy Miracle)

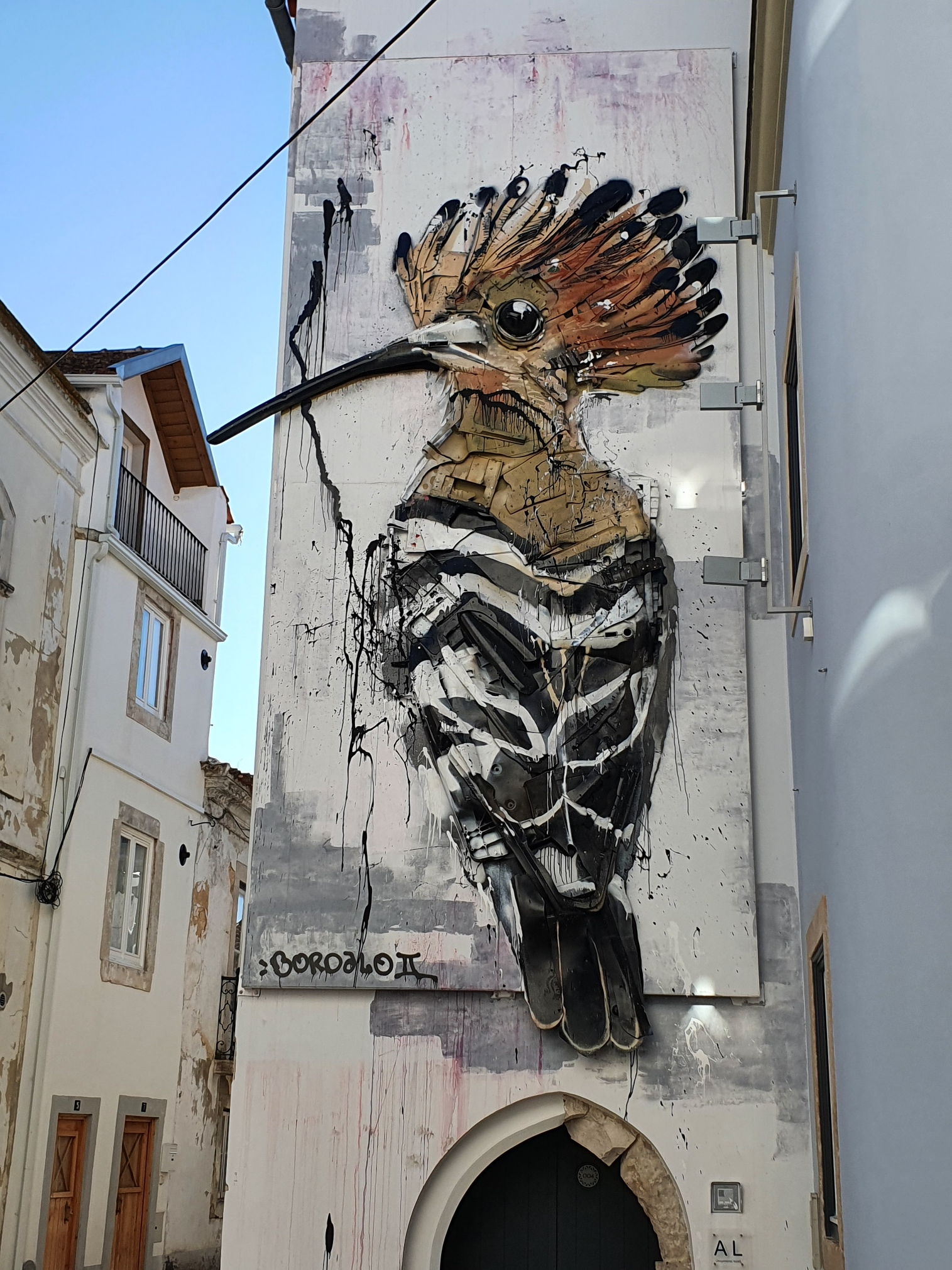
Hoopoe, street art by Bordalo II in the historic centre

Santarém city centre has several monuments, including the largest and most varied ensemble of gothic churches in Portugal. These include fine examples of transitional Romanesque–Gothic, mendicant (plain style derived from the mendicant orders) and late (flamboyant) Gothic. In addition, the city has nice examples of Manueline, Renaissance, Mannerist and Baroque architecture.

- Old Castle of Santarém (Porta do Sol): Located on a high slope over the Tagus river and the surrounding landscape, the site of the old castle of Santarém is now a park. Part of the walls and towers of the castle are still preserved.
- Church of Saint John of Alporão (Igreja de São João de Alporão): Built between the 12th and the 13th centuries by the Knights Hospitallers, this church is an example of transitional architecture, with a Romanesque main portal and an early Gothic main chapel and vaulting. The arches of the ambulatory of the main chapel show Arabic (Mudéjar) influences. The church now houses a small Archaeological Museum. Its most important piece is the flamboyant Gothic tomb of Duarte de Meneses who disappeared in a battle in North Africa in 1465. His tomb is empty.
- Cabaças Tower (Torre das Cabaças): Ancient defensive tower of the mediaeval wall of the city. Houses the Time Museum with an exhibition about the measurement of time through the ages.
- Fountain of the Fig Trees (Fonte das Figueiras): Rare example of a 14th-century fountain in Portugal, decorated with merlons and coats-of-arms of Portugal and King Dinis I.
- Convent of Saint Claire (Convento de Santa Clara): 13th-century convent. Good example of Portuguese mendicant Gothic style. It also included a now lost altarpiece by the Mannerist artist Diogo de Contreiras.
- Convent of Saint Francis (Convento de São Francisco): Another 13th-century convent in medicant style. Has a nice Gothic cloister. King Ferdinand I was buried here.
- Church of Saint Stephen – Sanctuary of the Most Holy Miracle (Igreja de Santo Estevão – Santuário do Santíssimo Milagre): Home to the 13th-century Eucharistic Miracle of Santarém, a popular destination among Catholics worldwide.
- Church of the Grace (Igreja da Graça): Built between the 14th and 15th centuries in a mix of mendicant and flamboyant Gothic styles. Has a main portal and rose window (believed to be unique in the world, carved out of a single stone) that shows the influence of the Monastery of Batalha. The first governor of Ceuta Pedro de Meneses (died 1437) and his wife are buried here in a magnificent Gothic tomb with their recumbent figures holding each other's hands. Pedro Álvares Cabral, discoverer of Brazil, and his wife are buried under a simple slab near the main chapel. The church was extensively renovated in the 1950s, eliminating all traces of development of the church later than 1500, so the current condition of the church provides a unique insight into a late 15th century church.
- Church of Marvila (Igreja de Marvila): This 16th-century church has a nice portal and main chapel in Manueline style. The nave and pulpit are in early Renaissance style. The interior walls are covered with 17th-century-multicoloured tiles with geometric patterns. It has one of the most outstanding tile-based interior decorations in Portugal.
- Cathedral of Santarém (Sé-Catedral): Built in the 17th century in mannerist style as the Jesuit church of the city, it became the Seminary church after the Jesuits were expelled from Portugal in the mid-18th century. The interior decoration is very rich, with altarpieces from various periods and styles (Mannerist and Baroque) and a ceiling with an illusionist painting. Since the 1970s it is the Cathedral of Santarém. The site of the church and seminary was previously occupied by the medieval royal palace of Santarém.

== Sport and leisure ==
The National Agricultural Fair has taken place since 1954. The annual event is held on the grounds of the CNEMA - National Exhibition Center and Agricultural Markets, south of the city. From 1999 to 2001 the main arena (39°13′05″N 8°41′52″W) was converted into a motorcycle speedway track and held a round of the 1999 European Club Champions' Cup and the 2000 Under-21 World Championship.

== Notable citizens ==
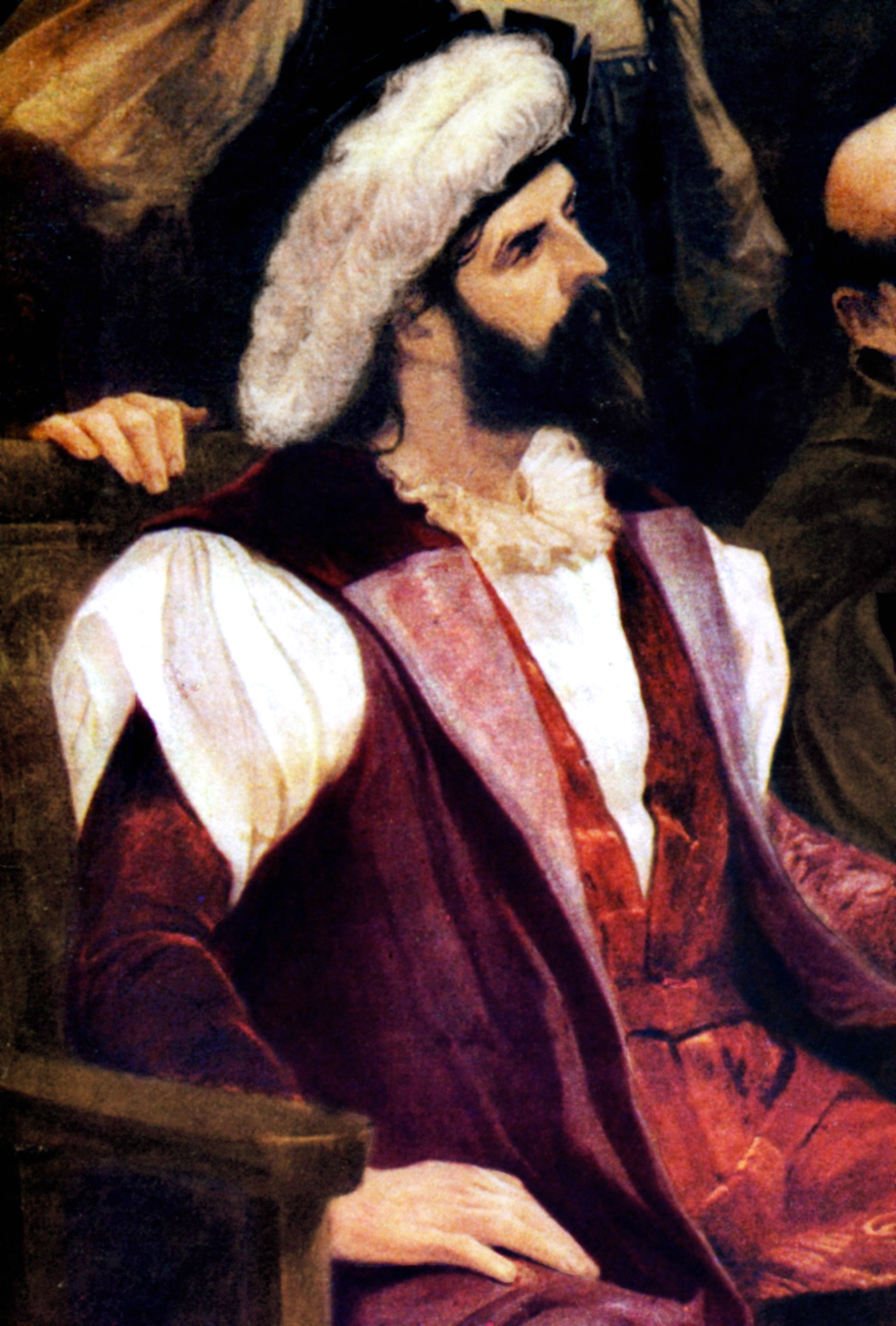
Pedro Álvares Cabral

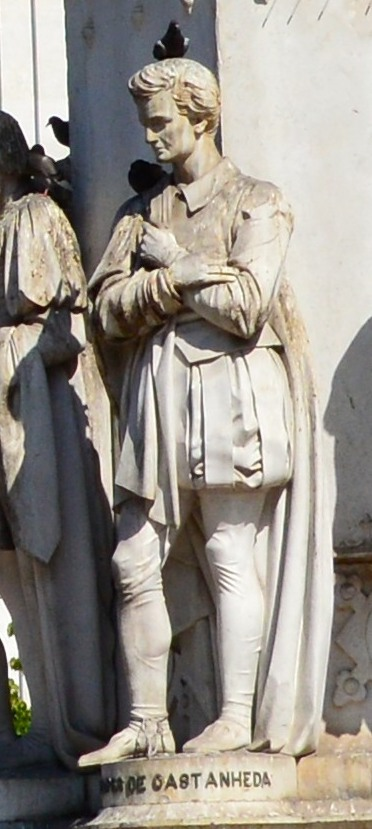
Fernão Lopes de Castanheda

=== Early times ===
- John of Biclaro (ca.540 - after 621) a Visigoth chronicler.
- Ibn Bassām (1058–1147) an Arab poet and historian from al-Andalus
- Blanche of Portugal (1259–1321) an infanta, the firstborn child of King Afonso III of Portugal
- Moses Navarro (?-1370 in Lisbon) was Chief Rabbi in the court of Peter I of Portugal for 30 years, influenced legislation and royal actions in favor of the Jewish community in Portugal.
- Afonso de Alprão (died 1422), Franciscan friar and writer
- John, Constable of Portugal (1400–1442) an infante, the son of King John I of Portugal
- Ferdinand the Holy Prince (1402–1443) the sixth and youngest son of King John I of Portugal
- Pedro Álvares Cabral (1467/1468 – c. 1520 in Santarém) was a noble, military commander, navigator and explorer regarded as the discoverer of Brazil. Cabral conducted the first substantial exploration of the northeast coast of South America and claimed it for Portugal.
- Fernão Lopes de Castanheda (c. 1500–1559) was a historian in the early Renaissance. His History of the discovery and conquest of India, full of geographic and ethnographic objective information, was widely translated throughout Europe.
- Gaspar do Casal (1510–1584) Bishop of the Roman Catholic Diocese of Funchal.
- Estácio de Sá (1520–1567) a soldier and officer; waged war for the Portuguese crown in the colony of Brazil on the French colonists; founded the city of São Sebastião do Rio de Janeiro near the Sugarloaf Mountain, Brazil.
- Aires de Saldanha (1542–1605) a nobleman, Viceroy of Portuguese India and Governor of Tangiers
- Luís de Sousa (1555–1632) a monk and prose-writer, a member of the noble family of Sousa Coutinho.

=== More modern times ===
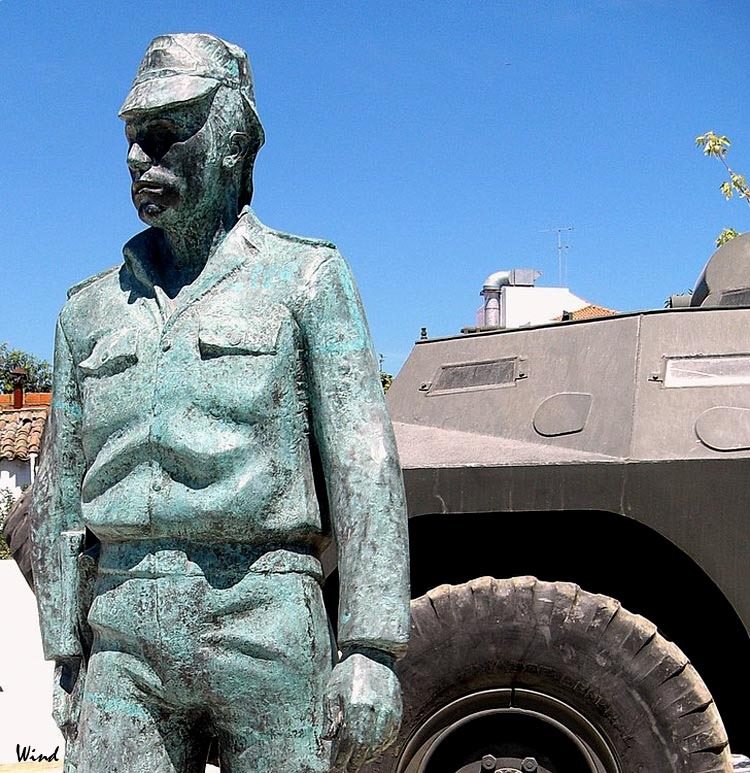
Statue of Captain Salgueiro Maia in Santarém

- Bernardo de Sá Nogueira de Figueiredo (1795–1876) a general officer and the Prime Minister of Portugal 1836/7
- Alfredo Holtreman, Viscount of Alvalade (1837–1920), lawyer for the royal household in Lisbon and philanthropist who was the protector and first chairman of Sporting Portugal
- Alice Pestana (1860–1929) a prolific Portuguese writer and pacifist.
- Henrique Campos (1909–1983) a Portuguese film director.
- Ruy Duarte de Carvalho (1941–2010) a poet, writer, anthropologist and filmmaker
- Salgueiro Maia (1944 – 1992 in Santarém), a captain in the Portuguese Army, key figure in the Carnation Revolution of 1974, was stationed at the army base in Santarém.
- Mário Viegas (1948–1996) actor, theater director and poetry reciter.
- Carlos Tavares (born 1958), former CEO of Stellantis.
- Fausto J Pinto (born 1960) cardiologist, medical academic and former Dean, Faculty of Medicine, University of Lisbon
- Rui Silva (born 1977) middle-distance athlete, gold medallist in 1500m at the 2001 World Indoor Championships.
- Ana Moura (born 1979), singer and notable modern exponent of the Fado genre, brought up in Coruche.
- Inês Henriques (born 1980) a race walker, competed at the 2004 and 2012 Summer Olympics
- Vera Santos (born 1981) a Portuguese race walker.
- Filipa Areosa (born 1992) a Portuguese film and TV actress.
- Margarida Corceiro (born 2002) Portuguese actress and model

== See also ==
- Santarém IPR
