= Cambres =

- Civil parish
- Location in Portugal
- Coordinates: 41.14°N 7.80°W
- Country: Portugal
- Region: Norte
- Intermunic. comm.: Douro
- District: Viseu
- Municipality: Lamego

Area
  - Total: 11.28 km^{2} (4.36 sq mi)

Population (2011)
  - Total: 2,066
  - Density: 180/km^{2} (470/sq mi)
- Time zone: UTC+00:00 (WET)
  - Summer (DST): UTC+01:00 (WEST)

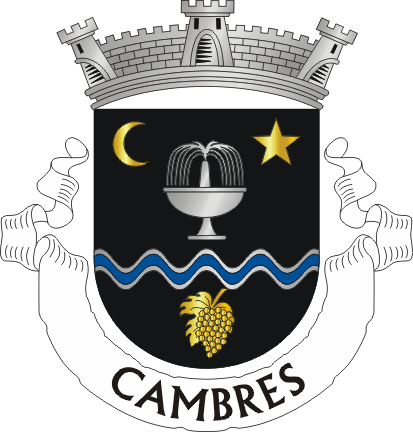
Crest of Cambres parish, Lamego municipality, Portugal.

Cambres is a town in Portugal. It is a parish of Lamego Municipality. The population in 2011 was 2,066, in an area of 11.28 km^{2}.
