= Arazede =

- Civil parish
- Location in Portugal
- Coordinates: 40.282°N 8.652°W
- Country: Portugal
- Region: Centro
- Intermunic. comm.: Região de Coimbra
- District: Coimbra
- Municipality: Montemor-o-Velho

Area
  - Total: 53.45 km^{2} (20.64 sq mi)

Population (2011)
  - Total: 5,508
  - Density: 103.0/km^{2} (266.9/sq mi)
- Time zone: UTC+00:00 (WET)
  - Summer (DST): UTC+01:00 (WEST)

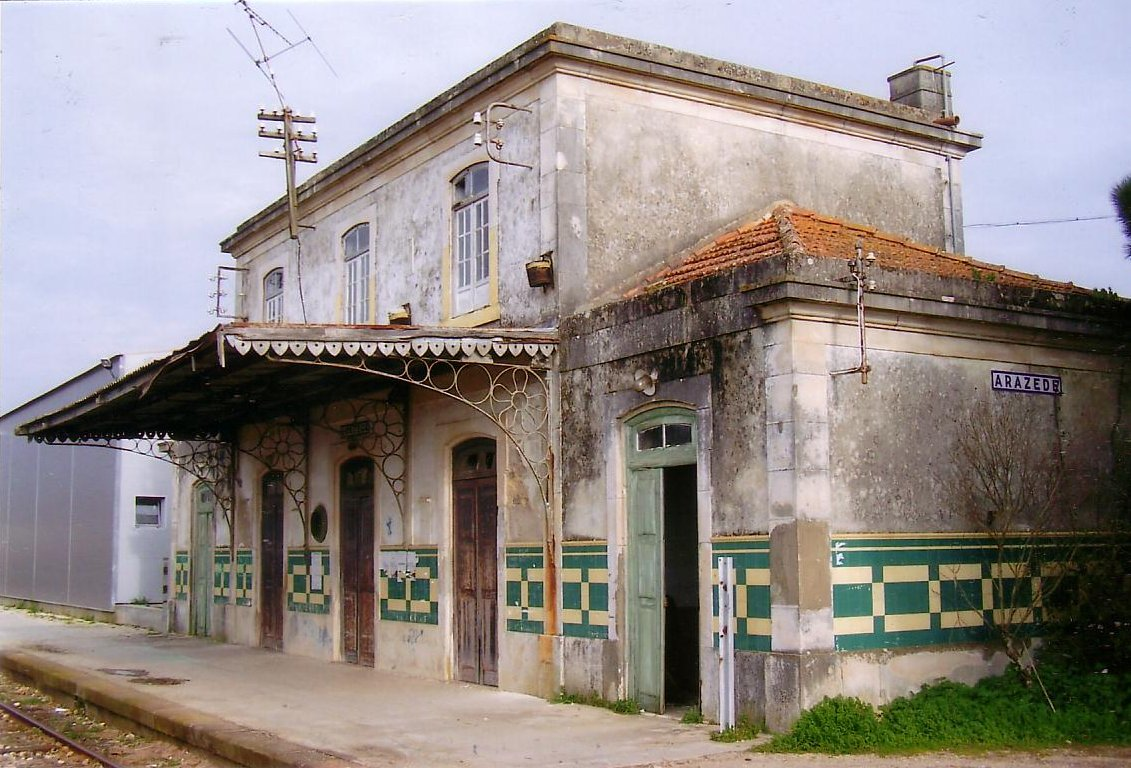
Arazede stop at the Ramal da Figueira da Foz, Portugal

Arazede is a town in Montemor-o-Velho Municipality in Portugal. The population in 2011 was 5,508, in an area of 53.45 km^{2}.
