= Gandarela de Basto =

Town in Portugal

Coordinates: 41°28′N 8°02′W

Gandarela de Basto is a town in Portugal. It is part of the Celorico de Basto Municipality.
