= Alcanhões =

- Civil parish
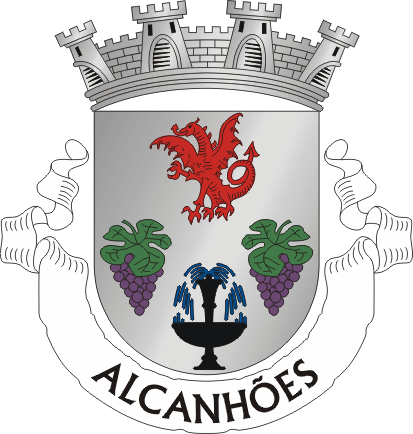
- Coat of arms

- Location in Portugal
- Coordinates: 39.297°N 8.660°W
- Country: Portugal
- Region: Oeste e Vale do Tejo
- Intermunic. comm.: Lezíria do Tejo
- District: Santarém
- Municipality: Santarém

Area
  - Total: 11.45 km^{2} (4.42 sq mi)

Population (2011)
  - Total: 1,469
  - Density: 130/km^{2} (330/sq mi)
- Time zone: UTC+00:00 (WET)
  - Summer (DST): UTC+01:00 (WEST)

Alcanhões is a town and administrative parish in Santarém, Portugal. The population in 2011 was 1,469, in an area of 11.45 km².
