= Amiais de Baixo =

- Civil parish
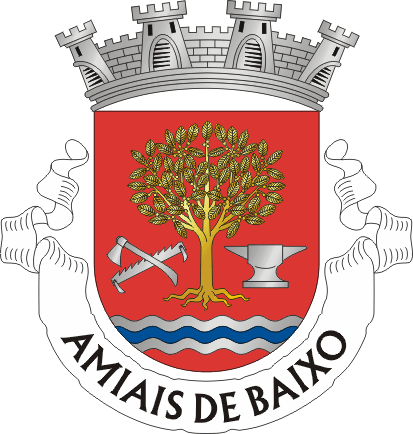
- Coat of arms

- Location in Portugal
- Coordinates: 39.443°N 8.732°W
- Country: Portugal
- Region: Oeste e Vale do Tejo
- Intermunic. comm.: Lezíria do Tejo
- District: Santarém
- Municipality: Santarém

Area
  - Total: 6.30 km^{2} (2.43 sq mi)

Population (2011)
  - Total: 1,851
  - Density: 290/km^{2} (760/sq mi)
- Time zone: UTC+00:00 (WET)
  - Summer (DST): UTC+01:00 (WEST)

Amiais de Baixo is a town in Portugal, and a parish of the municipality of Santarém. The population in 2011 was 1,851, in an area of 6.30 km^{2}.
