= Canas de Santa Maria =

- Civil parish
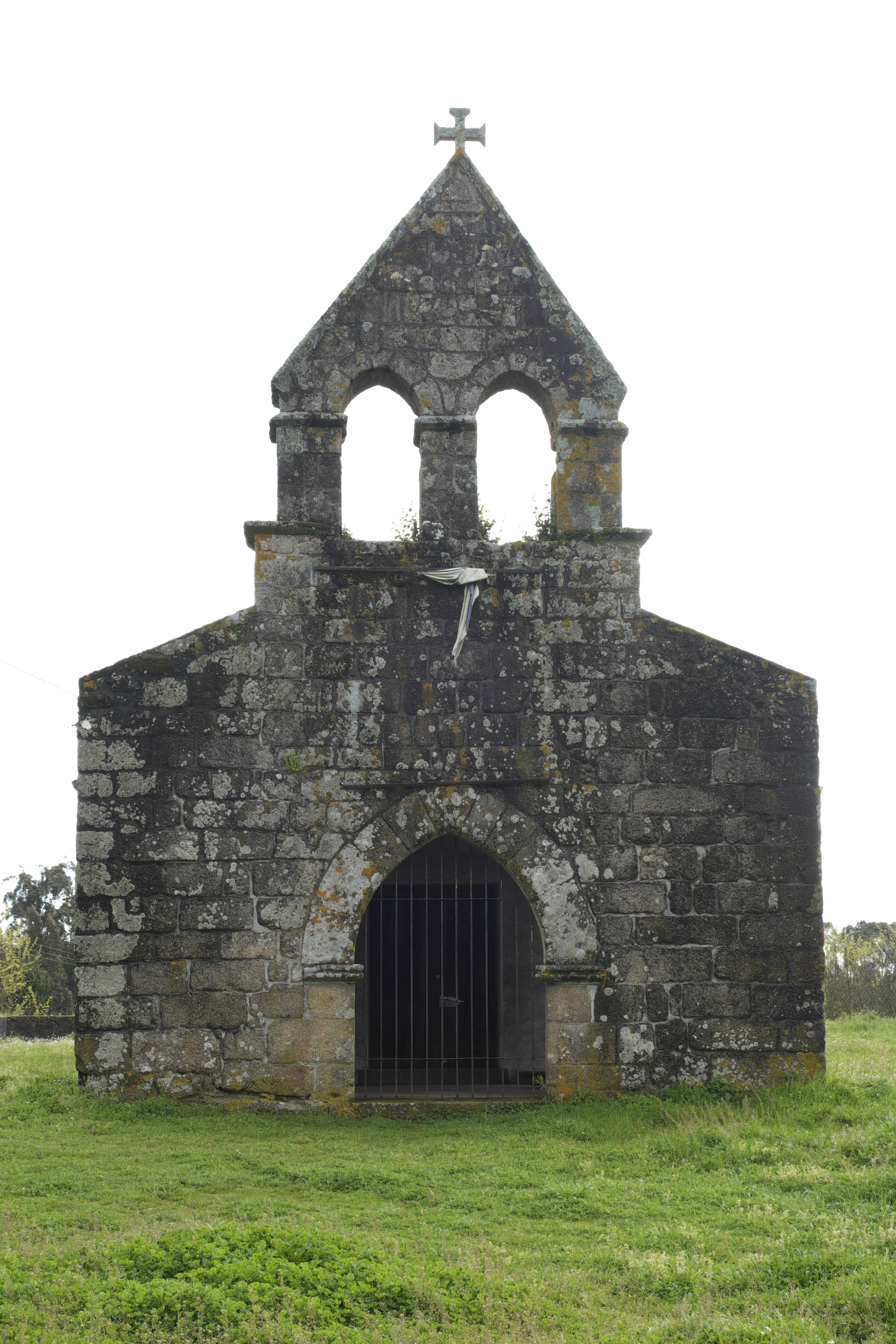
- Church in Canas de Santa Maria

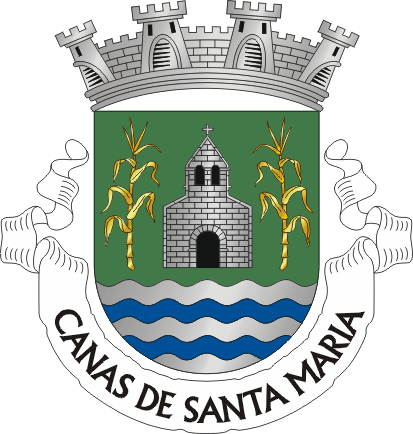
- Coat of arms

- Location in Portugal
- Coordinates: 40.552°N 8.037°W
- Country: Portugal
- Region: Centro
- Intermunic. comm.: Viseu Dão Lafões
- District: Viseu
- Municipality: Tondela

Area
  - Total: 13.85 km^{2} (5.35 sq mi)

Population (2011)
  - Total: 1,806
  - Density: 130.4/km^{2} (337.7/sq mi)
- Time zone: UTC+00:00 (WET)
  - Summer (DST): UTC+01:00 (WEST)

Canas de Santa Maria is a town and a freguesia in the Tondela municipality, Viseu District, Portugal. The population in 2011 was 1,806, in an area of 13.85 km^{2}. The freguesia contains the small village Valverde.
