= Alhadas =

- Civil parish
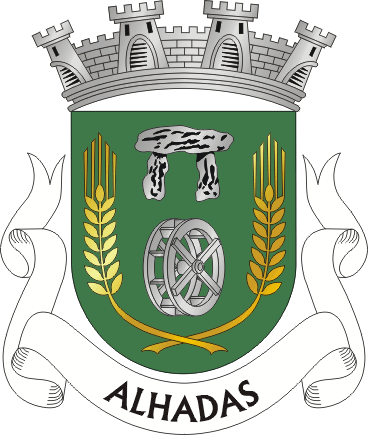
- Coat of arms

- Location in Portugal
- Coordinates: 40.185°N 8.791°W
- Country: Portugal
- Region: Centro
- Intermunic. comm.: Região de Coimbra
- District: Coimbra
- Municipality: Figueira da Foz

Area
  - Total: 31.84 km^{2} (12.29 sq mi)

Population (2011)
  - Total: 4,757
  - Density: 150/km^{2} (390/sq mi)
- Time zone: UTC+00:00 (WET)
  - Summer (DST): UTC+01:00 (WEST)

Alhadas is a town in the municipality of Figueira da Foz, Portugal. The population in 2011 was 4,757, in an area of 31.84 km^{2}.
