= Castle of Salir =

Castle in southern Portugal

Coordinates: 37°14′34″N 8°02′48″W

- Castelo de Salir
- Faro, Algarve, Algarve; Near Salir in Portugal
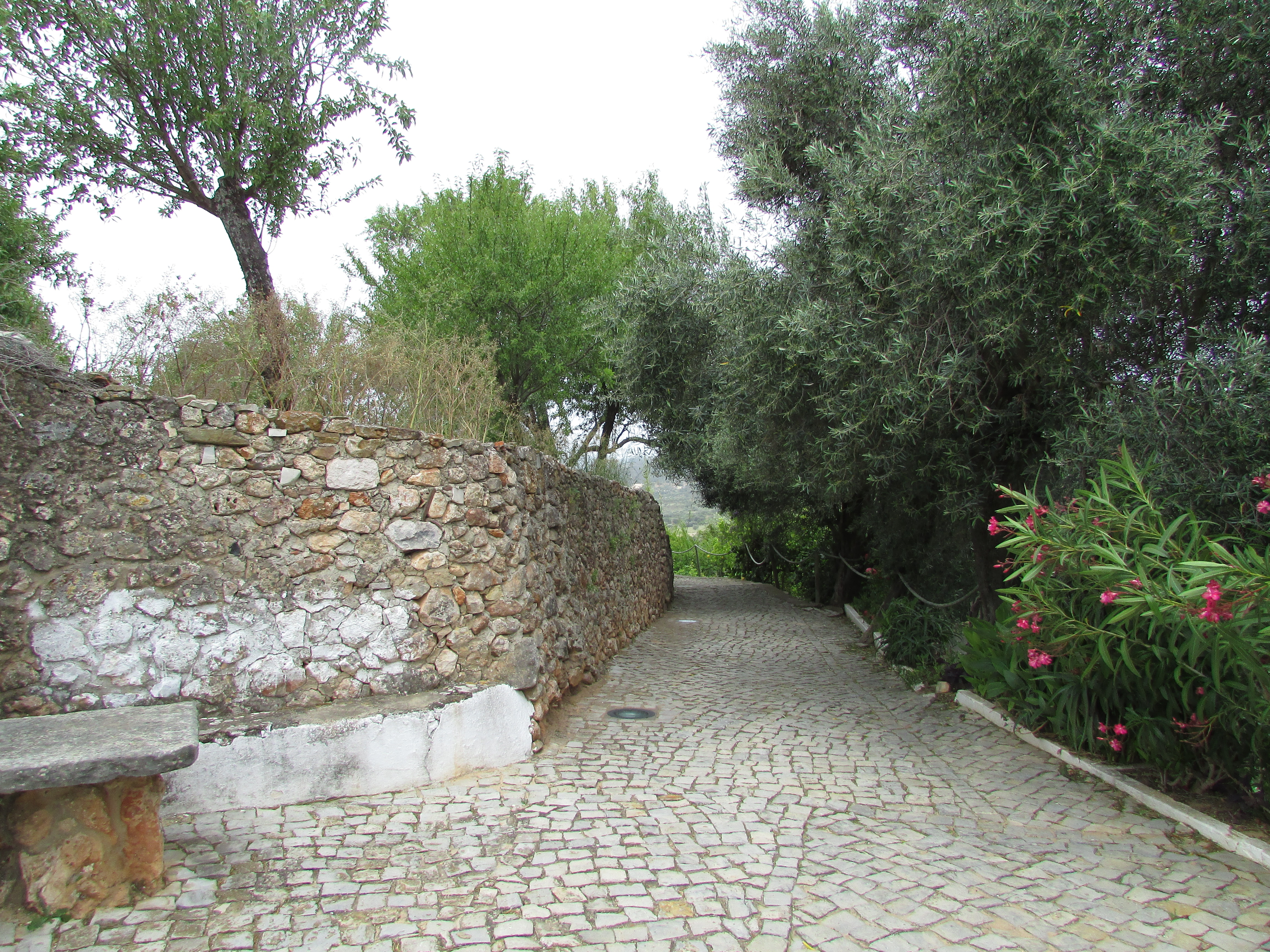
- Ruins of the Castle of Salir

Site information
- Type: Castle
- Owner: Portuguese Republic
- Open to the public: Private

Site history
- Built: 11th–12th century
- Materials: Stone, Tile, Wood, Steel, Mosaics, Taipa

The Castle of Salir (Portuguese: Castelo de Salir) is an Almohad fortress, located in the civil parish of the same name (Salir (Loulé)), 16 kilometres from the municipality seat of Loulé in the Portuguese Algarve.

== History ==
The castle is a late Islamic castle, built during a period of intense pressure from Christian forces. It was part of the a network of Almohad castles, an extensive line of coastal defenses that stretched into the interior from Castro Marim until Alcoutim. Salir was a rural defensive post, one of several that were aligned towards the interior: it was an advanced outpost. Its function was to protect the farmers from attacks by Christians, and which intensified after the conquest of Tavira by knights of the Order of Santiago. The construction of the castle occurred in the 12th century, but was King Sancho I of Portugal conquered the settlement in 1189. Ever mindful of Moorish counteroffensives, the walls were reinforced at the end of the 12th century. The majority of ceramics discovered on the site date to the period between the 12th and 13th century.

Salir enters the compiled documents of the Portugaliae Monumenta Historica, as the name of a place taken by commander Paio Peres Correia. The master was to await the arrival of Afonso (1248–1279) so that they could unite their forces and remove the last vestiges of resistance in the Algarve. Consequently, the fortification of Salir, within this context, had a strategic role. Later, a fire destroyed the castle, which was reconstructed two times, before actually falling into ruins.

Around 1505, there were less than 87 residential homes in Salir.

By the end of the 16th century, the castle was already abandoned and in a state of ruins.

In 1758, there were 11 homes in Salir, likely due to the 1755 Lisbon earthquake which caused damage to the castle and surrounding countryside.

The civil parish of São Sebastião de Salir had approximately 408 homes in 1798.

The slow deterioration of the castle was, by 1841, semi-complete, as reports from the site suggest that the structure was in ruins.

The first archaeological investigation of the castle and surroundings began in 1987.

Salir was elevated to the status of town in 1993.

=== Legend ===
Salir received its name, from the "disappearance" of the daughter of the Moorish alcalde Aben-Fabilla, so a legend suggests, who escaped when he saw his castle being threatened by the army of Afonso III. But, before fleeing, the alcalde buried all his gold, thinking that he could retrieve it later. When the Christians took the castle, they discovered it was empty, except for the beautiful daughter of the alcade who prayed with fervor, and who had preferred to stay in the castle and die a salir. From a nearby mountain, Aben-Fabilia saw his captive daughter in the hands of the Christians and with his right hand made a sign of the Star of David, uttering some mysterious words. At that moment, while the knight Gonçalo Peres was talking to the girl, she was transformed into a statue of rock. The news of the enchanted Moor permeated the castle. But, one day the statue disappeared. The memory of the strange event became linked to Salir, whose towns folk named the village in honour of the courageous youth. The legend concludes with the reflection that, on certain nights, the enchanted statue appears in the Castle.

== Architecture ==
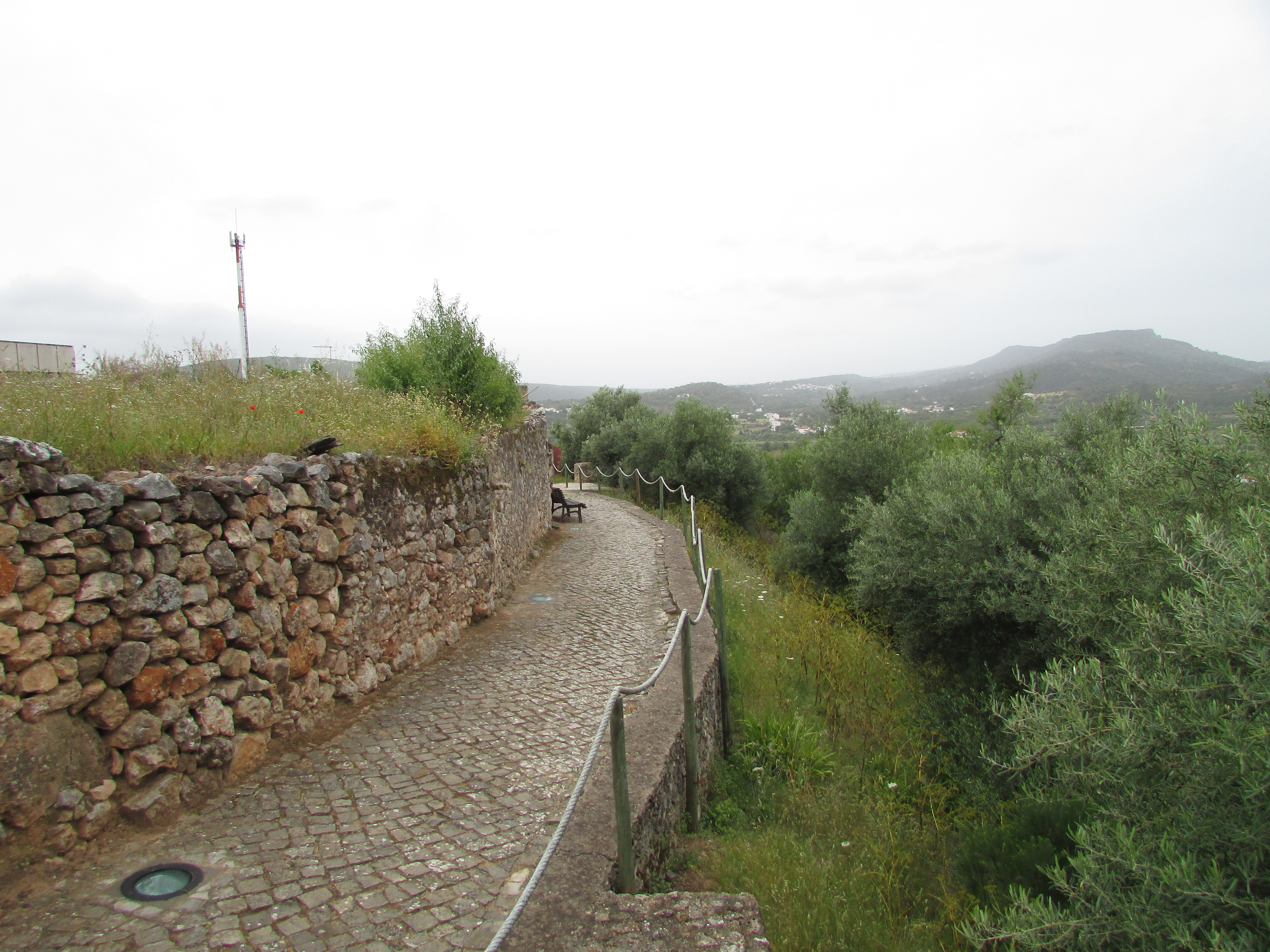
The north elevation of the castle where a narrow lane, called the Rua dos Muros do Castelo, runs around the remains of the castle curtain walls

The castle is located in a rural, semi-mountainous isolated location, implanted in an elevated point in the Algarvean Barrocal, located north-northwest from the parish seat of Salir. It is situated in an area of ample visibility over the fertile valleys to the north and west. The elevated hilltop is 250 metres above sea level, relatively close to the highest points of the Serra do Caldeirão. Located to the east is the Roman archaeological site of Torrinha.

The castle is laid-out in a central, but irregular, plan in the form of oval. The articulated spaces are aligned horizontally, but with no roofing (except for the traditional home at its centre and interpretative center).

The main facade is oriented towards the south, where the slope is less accentuated. A main doorway is not identifiable, although there are indications that it was situated on the extreme southeast, corresponding to the principal access-way to the castle. There are five definable walls, defined by the main fate and four separate towers, all rectangular and some state of ruin. Tower "D", also known as the Muro do Meio (Middle Wall) is in the northeast, in an area of accentuated slope, marked by a robust berm. The wall is little more than 1 metre (3.3 ft) wide, that was almost completely destroyed in course of accessing the spaces; what remains is just a section 4.7 by 3.88 metres (15.4 ft × 12.7 ft). Tower "C", known as the Torre da Alfarrobeira (Tower of the Carob Tree) is located in the northern flank of the castle, precisely at the point where the slope in relation to the valley is more accentuated. A three-metre (9.8 ft) high section of this wall still remains, 5.1 by 4.6 metres (17 ft × 15 ft) in size. Tower "B", referred to as the Muro Maior (Major Wall) is along the northeastern flank, farthest from the main road, and a section that is similar to the rest, with the addition of buildings abutting along the east and south. The south tower is integrated into these constructions, and abutting the southeastern wall. There are also two sections, 4.8 metres (16 ft) wide, that are conserved to about 4 metres (13 ft): in the north, that connect Tower "D" and Tower "B", passing through "C"; and a small section in the southeast, known as the Muro da Sabedoria (Wall of Wisdom). This is all that is left of the circuit that encircles the castle and connected to the interior of the grounds.

The excavated area, east of Tower "B" consists of an irregular rectangular area where the discovery of a few constructions were first identified: specifically, they included a kitchen and living spaces dating to the period of the Moorish occupation of the castle.

The paths are gardened/landscaped with Portuguese pavement stone, limited the corners and towers, while bunks were deposited in the garden around Tower "B".

It is difficult to determine the state of the original interiors, articulation of the spaces, illumination or ceilings, due to the state of decay. The principal artery is defined by the Travessa do Castelo, which parts from the main entrance southeast and terminates in the west, dividing the courtyard of the castle in half.

=== Interpretative Center ===
Located in the excavated area of the castle, east of Tower "B", it is a rectangular building, with a simple single floor. The principal facade is oriented to the south, towards the public access-way, accessible by a double flight of stairs.
