= Fermil de Basto =

Town in Celorico de Basto Municipality, Portugal

Coordinates: 41°25′N 7°59′W

Fermil de Basto is a town in Portugal. It is part of the Celorico de Basto Municipality.
