= Salir (Loulé) =

- Civil parish
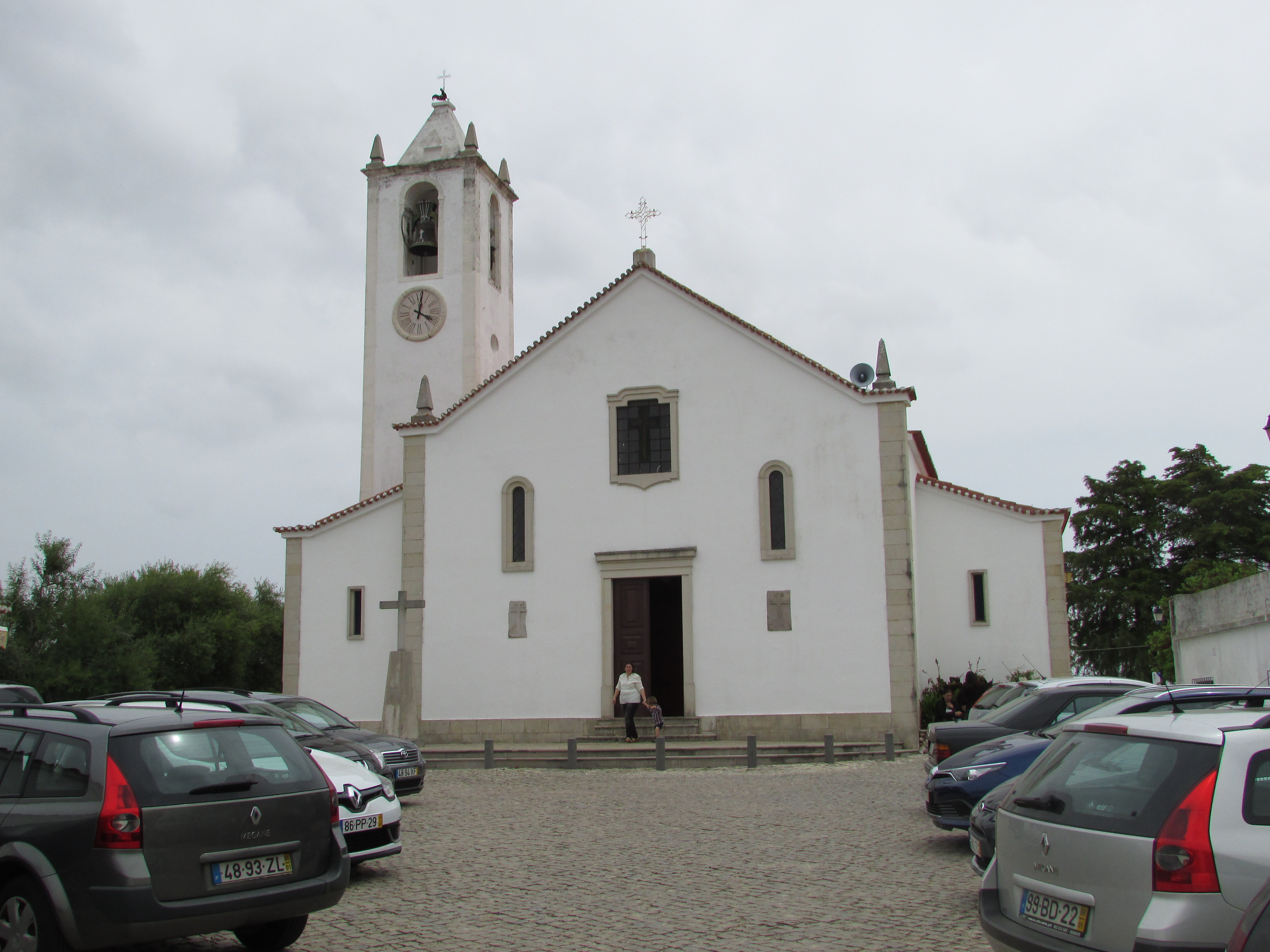
- Igreja de São Sebastião

- Location in Portugal
- Coordinates: 37.241°N 8.045°W
- Country: Portugal
- Region: Algarve
- Intermunic. comm.: Algarve
- District: Faro
- Municipality: Loulé

Area
  - Total: 187.75 km^{2} (72.49 sq mi)

Population (2011)
  - Total: 2,775
  - Density: 14.78/km^{2} (38.28/sq mi)
- Time zone: UTC+00:00 (WET)
  - Summer (DST): UTC+01:00 (WEST)
- Website: http://www.salir.pt/

Salir is a village and civil parish (freguesia) located in the municipality of Loulé, Portugal. The population in 2011 was 2,775, in an area of 187.75 km². Situated away from the coast, Salir is known by its castle. There are two churches in Salir. Salir is close to the village of Alte.

== Climate ==
Climate data for Salir, altitude: 205 m (673 ft), 1985-2021
Month	Jan	Feb	Mar	Apr	May	Jun	Jul	Aug	Sep	Oct	Nov	Dec	Year
Average precipitation mm (inches)	89.4 (3.52)	63.1 (2.48)	58.9 (2.32)	66.9 (2.63)	49.4 (1.94)	9.8 (0.39)	1.9 (0.07)	3.0 (0.12)	30.0 (1.18)	78.5 (3.09)	103.0 (4.06)	139.3 (5.48)	693.2 (27.28)
Source: Portuguese Environment Agency

Climate data for Salir, altitude: 205 m (673 ft), 1951-1980
Month	Jan	Feb	Mar	Apr	May	Jun	Jul	Aug	Sep	Oct	Nov	Dec	Year
Average precipitation mm (inches)	159 (6.3)	138 (5.4)	130 (5.1)	69 (2.7)	51 (2.0)	25 (1.0)	2 (0.1)	3 (0.1)	19 (0.7)	109 (4.3)	125 (4.9)	147 (5.8)	977 (38.4)
Source: Instituto da Água
