= Fausto J Pinto =

Portuguese academic (born 1960)

Fausto Pinto
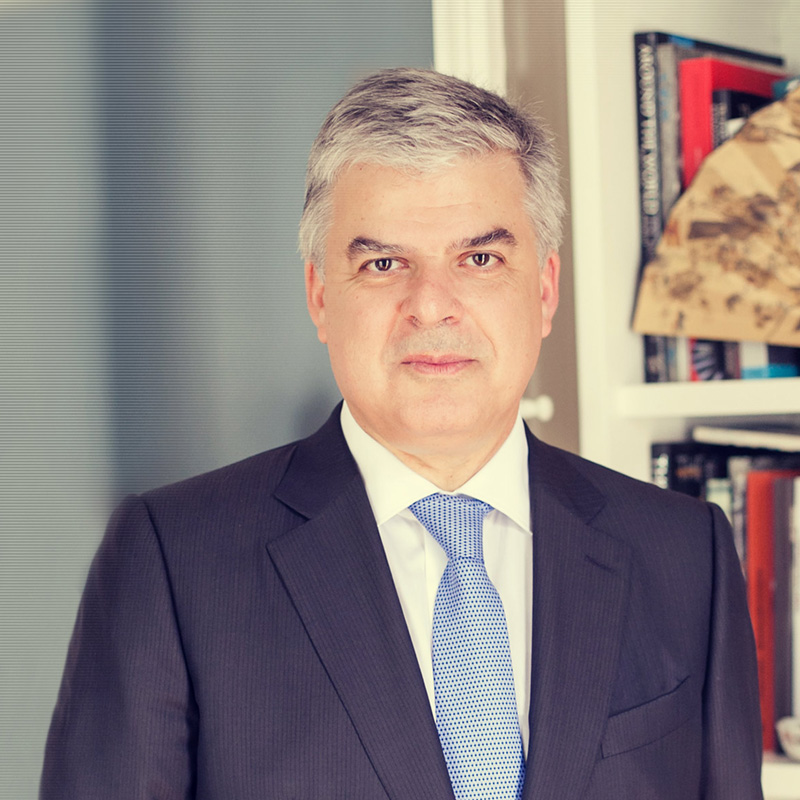
- Born: 3 November 1960; Santarém, Portugal
- Occupations: Dean of Lisbon Medical School, University of Lisbon

Fausto J. Pinto (born 3 November 1960) is a Portuguese academic. He is Professor of Cardiology at Hospital de Santa Maria. Former dean of the Faculty of Medicine at the University of Lisbon.

== Career ==
From 2002 to 2004, Pinto served as president and founder of the European Association of Echocardiography. From 2008 to 2010, he was Chairman of the ESC's Congress Program Committee, followed by President from 2014 to 2016 and chair of the European Heart Agency from 2016 to 2018.

Pinto graduated from Lisbon University Medical School in 1984. He completed his Cardiology internship at Hospital de Santa Maria, and was a fellow at the Stanford University School of Medicine. He was then worked as a clinician the Echocardiography laboratory and underwent a fellowship in Interventional Cardiology at the same institution.

His main areas of interest research are: Advanced Cardiovascular Imaging; Intracoronary Ultrasound; Echocardiography; Heart failure and Diastology and Hypertension.

His main positions are Full Professor of Medicine/ Cardiology at Lisbon University Medical School (since 2010); Dean of the Faculty of Medicine, University of Lisbon (since 2015); National Coordinator of the Medical Schools Council (2018-2020); President of the executive board of the Lisbon Academic Medical Centre (2019-2021); President Elect World Heart Federation (2019-2020); Head of the Cardiology Department, University Hospital of Santa Maria (since 2014); Head of the Heart and Vascular Department, University Hospital of Santa Maria (since 2016); President of the European Society of Cardiology (2014-2016); Past President of the European Society of Cardiology (since 2018)

He is currently the Dean of the Faculty of Medicine of the University of Lisbon., and professor of Cardiology at the Hospital de Santa Maria. He is the president-elect of the World Heart Federation for the period 2019-2020 and President of the executive board of the Lisbon Academic Medical Centre for the same period. Fausto is also director of Lisbon Cardiovascular Institute since 1999.

He was invited to give an interview to CANAL SAÚDE + to talk about the Medical training platform in Portugal, which was created with the aim of allowing to put on the agenda some of the most urgent topics in defense of quality medicine.

== Awards and honours ==
He was recognized with the International Service Award 2019 during the ACC's 68th Annual Scientific Session, in New Orleans, USA, during the ACC Convocation, Inauguration and Awards Ceremony. This distinction was created by the American College of Cardiology (ACC) and aims to distinguish and reward the contribution and the progress of Cardiovascular Medicine.

He was presented with Dr. Henry Fok Memorial Lecture Medal by the President of the Sino Luso International Forum and Founding Dean of the Faculty of Medicine at Must Professor Manson Fok, during the "Sino Luso International Forum", in May 2019, in Macau.

In May 2019, Fausto Pinto was ordained Member of the Academia Nacional de Medicina of Brazil, one of the oldest in the world.

Fausto Pinto is the mentor of CODEM-LP (Constituição da Rede de Cooperação das Escolas Médicas de Língua Portuguesa), the solemn session of the signing protocol took place at the Aula Magna, Faculty of Medicine, University of Lisbon on 14 November 2019. The cooperation includes 13 Medical Schools from Portugal, Brazil, Angola, Mozambique and Macau, and will strengthen the role of medical schools in Lusophony by providing them with an exchange tool that will surely contribute to closer scientific, pedagogical and cultural relations and further development of education and research in medical practice.
