= Santa Marta de Penaguião =

- Municipality
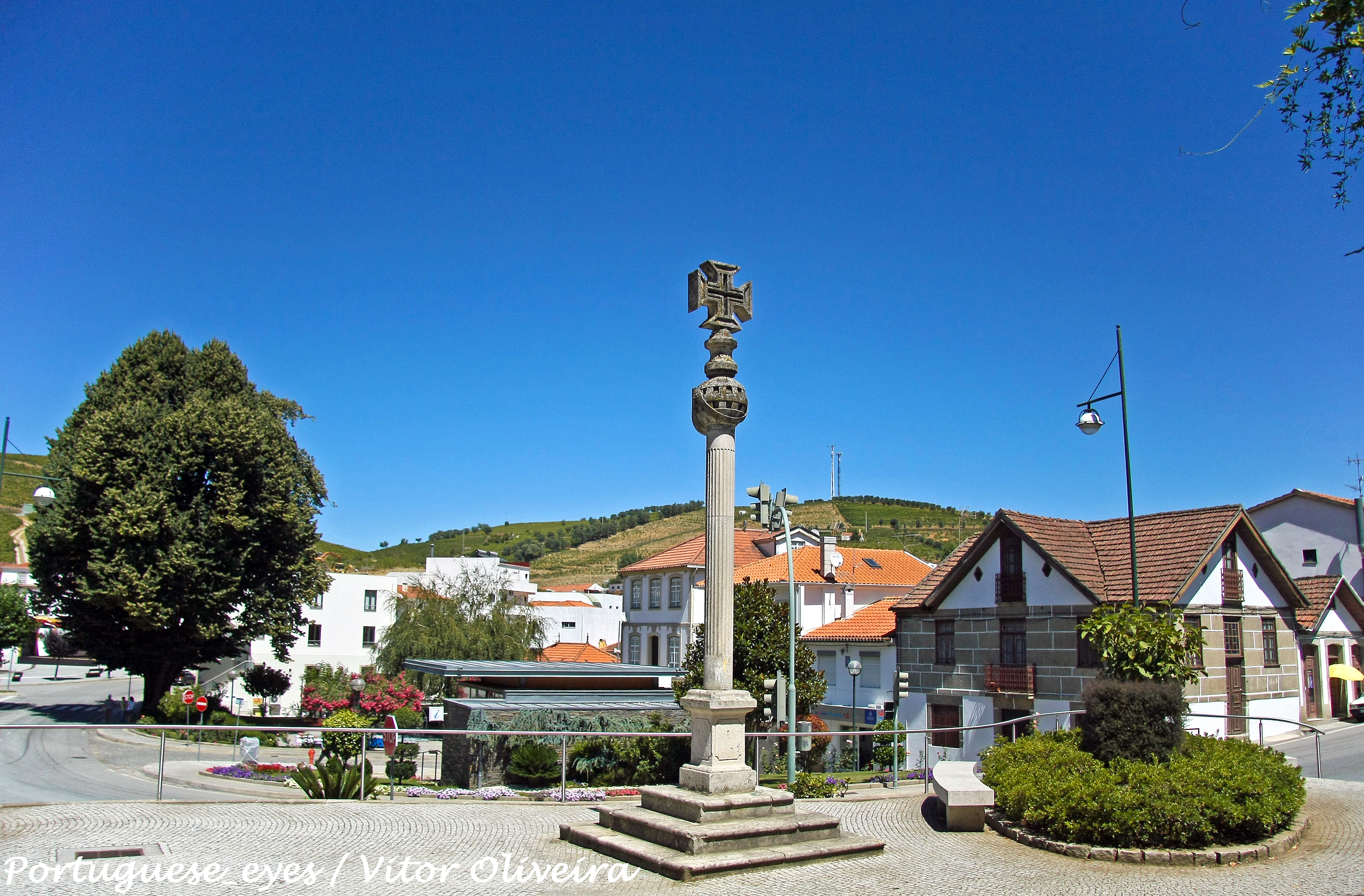

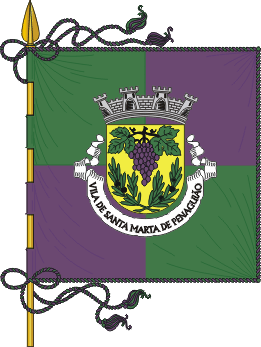
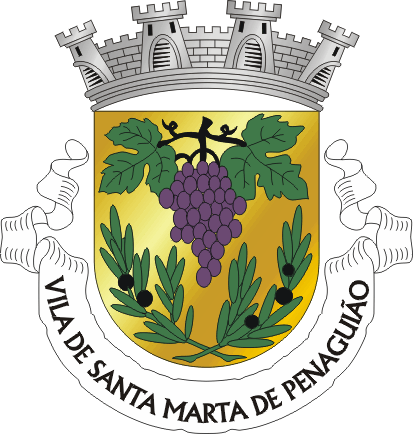
- Flag Coat of arms
- Interactive map of Santa Marta de Penaguião
- Coordinates: 41°13′24″N 7°49′11″W
- Country: Portugal
- Region: Norte
- Intermunic. comm.: Douro
- District: Vila Real
- Seat: Santa Marta de Penaguião Municipal Chamber
- Parishes: 7

Government
  - President: Luís Machado (PS)

Area
  - Total: 69.28 km^{2} (26.75 sq mi)
- Elevation: 577 m (1,893 ft)

Population (2011)
  - Total: 7,356
  - Density: 106.2/km^{2} (275.0/sq mi)
- Time zone: UTC+00:00 (WET)
  - Summer (DST): UTC+01:00 (WEST)
- Postal code: 5030
- Area code: 254
- Patron: Santa Marta
- Website: http://www.cm-smpenaguiao.pt

Santa Marta de Penaguião (Portuguese pronunciation: [ˈsɐ̃tɐ ˈmaɾtɐ ðɨ pɨnɐɣiˈɐ̃w] or [- ˌpenɐɣiˈɐ̃w]) is a Portuguese municipality in the district of Vila Real, in the northern region of Douro. The population in 2011 was 7,356, in an area of 69.28 km^{2}.

== History ==
The history of Santa Marta de Penaguião is affirmed by vestiges of the castros that have been discovered in Fontes, Lobrigos, Cumieira, Louredo and Medrões, which were settled prior to the establishment of the Kingdom of Portugal. Some of the toponymy in the region also presupposes the existences of tribal clans in this Douro valley region.

The municipality of Santa Marta de Penaguião were part of the Terras de Penaguião, an administrative division that existed during early Middle Ages (9th-10th century) that extended between the Douro and Corgo watersheds, including the Serra do Marão and the Terras de Panóias (today Vila Real). Comprehensively, this included the current municipality, in addition to portions of the municipalities of Peso da Régua and Vila Real.

During the reign of Afonso Henriques the region was governed by Moço Viegas, son of Egas Moniz.

King Sancho I issued a charter (Portuguese: foral) in 1202, and King Manuel I re-issued a new foral on 15 December 1519. The forals provided detailed explanations of the rights, privileges and responsibilities of the local landowners, covered within the limits of the municipality.

During the 17th-18th century there was a marked increase in the homes, estates, churches and patrimony constructed in the municipality, while documents refer to expensive land rents obtained by seigneurial landowners. This was primarily due to export of wine and the cultivation of vineyards, which occupied a great part of the terraced landholdings of the local gentlemen. This success also brought a lot of opportunism, the mixing of castes, and later, the collapse of wine sales, as the quality deteriorated. In order to overcome these problems, and in order to rejuvenate exports, (through the influence of the friar João de Mansilha and the Marquess of Pombal), King Joseph signed into existence (10 September 1756) the Companhia Geral de Agricultura das Vinhas do Alto Douro.

This company improved the production of wine sales in the Douro valley, establishing a Demarcated Export product with specific quality expectations: wines that could not meet these levels of quality could not be sold as "Douro Wines". The Companhia Geral was also responsible for affixing similar demarcation to the Porto Wine, before any non-Douro brands began appearing in Europe.

In the 19th century, through the administrative reforms, and owing to the regions importance to the Demarcated Region of the Douro, Santa Marta retained its municipal status.

== Geography ==
Population of the Santa Marta de Penaguião Municipality (1801 - 2004)
Year	Pop.	±%
1801	10,731	—
1849	8,535	−20.5%
1900	11,422	+33.8%
1930	12,532	+9.7%
1960	13,282	+6.0%
1981	11,194	−15.7%
1991	9,703	−13.3%
2001	8,569	−11.7%
2011	7,356	−14.2%

Administratively, the municipality is divided into 7 civil parishes (freguesias):

- Alvações do Corgo
- Cumieira
- Fontes
- Louredo e Fornelos
- Medrões
- Lobrigos (São Miguel e São João Baptista) e Sanhoane
- Sever

== Notable people ==
- António Osório Sarmento de Figueiredo Jr. (1855–1935) a nobleman, jurist, politician and magistrate.
- Eurico Gomes (born 1955) known as Eurico, a former footballer with 313 club caps and 38 for Portugal.
