= Sever, Santa Marta de Penaguião =

Sever
- Civil parish
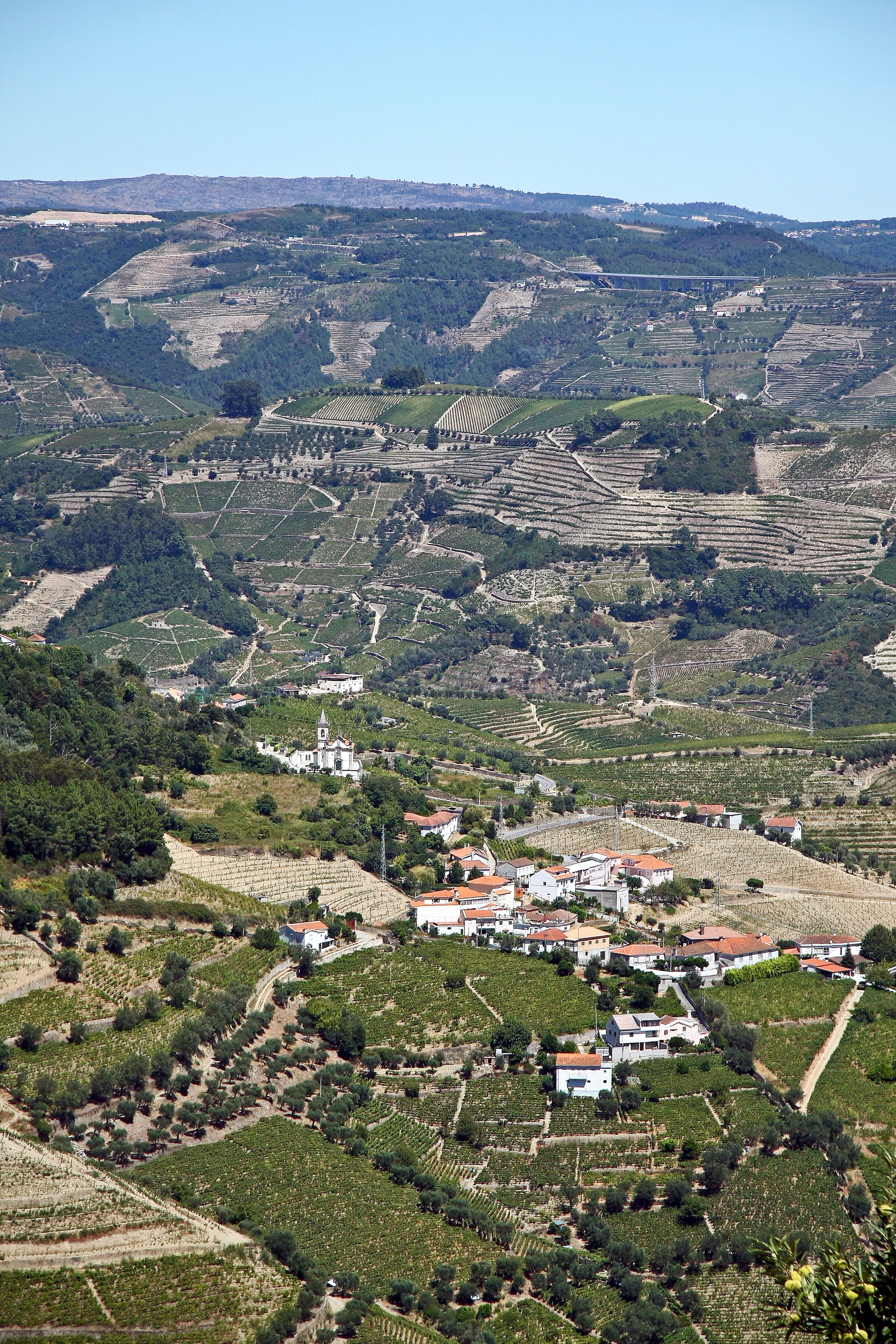

- Location in Portugal
- Coordinates: 41.229°N 7.790°W
- Country: Portugal
- Region: Norte
- Intermunic. comm.: Douro
- District: Vila Real
- Municipality: Santa Marta de Penaguião

Area
  - Total: 6.17 km^{2} (2.38 sq mi)

Population (2011)
  - Total: 714
  - Density: 116/km^{2} (300/sq mi)
- Time zone: UTC+00:00 (WET)
  - Summer (DST): UTC+01:00 (WEST)

Sever is a parish in the municipality of Santa Marta de Penaguião, Portugal. The population in 2011 was 714, in an area of 6.17 km^{2}.
