= Cumieira (Santa Marta de Penaguião) =

- Civil parish
- Location in Portugal
- Coordinates: 41.257°N 7.773°W
- Country: Portugal
- Region: Norte
- Intermunic. comm.: Douro
- District: Vila Real
- Municipality: Santa Marta de Penaguião

Area
  - Total: 11.07 km^{2} (4.27 sq mi)

Population (2011)
  - Total: 1,146
  - Density: 103.5/km^{2} (268.1/sq mi)
- Time zone: UTC+00:00 (WET)
  - Summer (DST): UTC+01:00 (WEST)

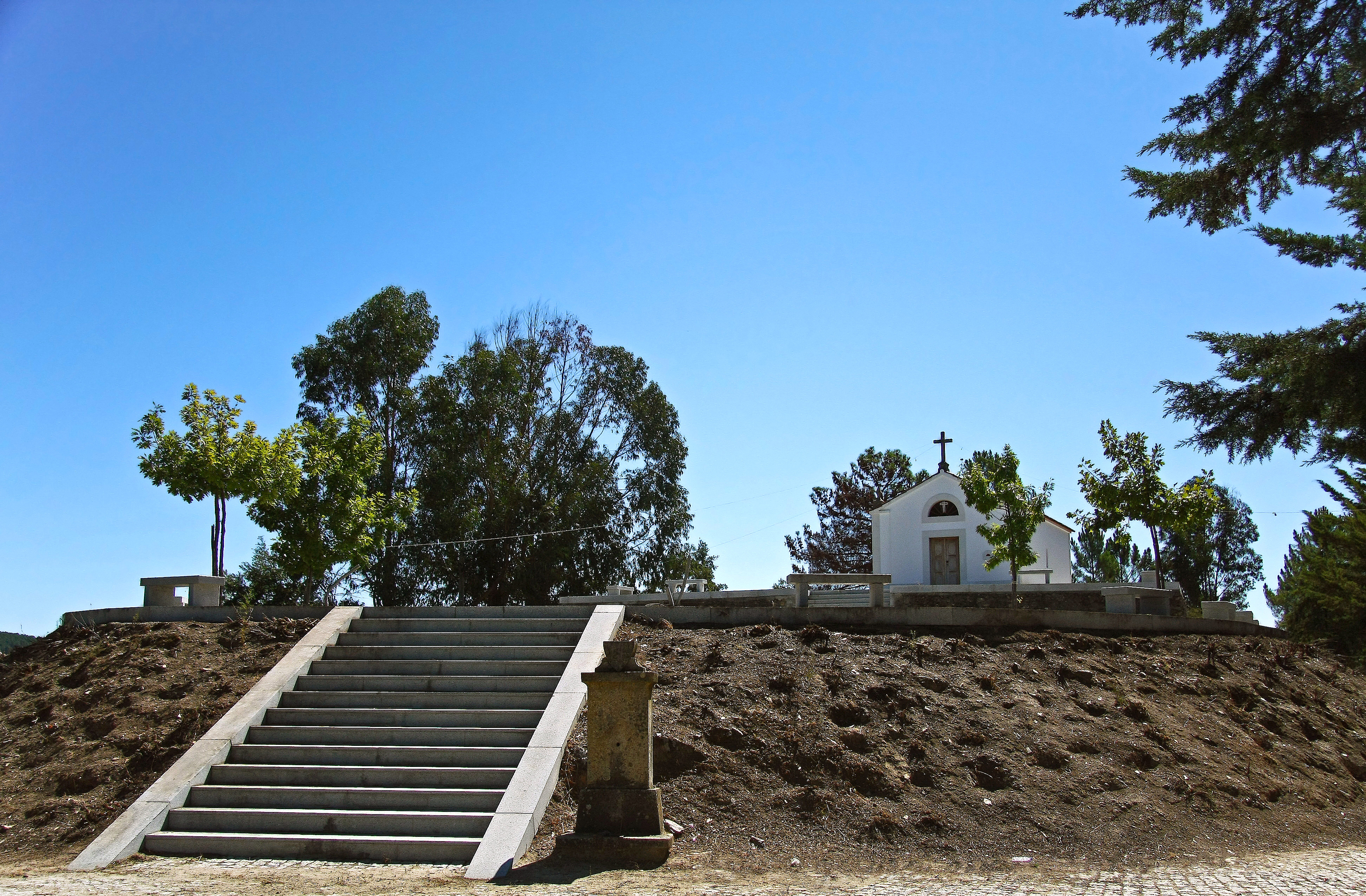

Cumieira is a civil parish in the municipality of Santa Marta de Penaguião, Portugal. The population in 2011 was 1,146, in an area of 11.07 km^{2}.
