= Fontes (Santa Marta de Penaguião) =

- Civil parish
- Location in Portugal
- Coordinates: 41.230°N 7.816°W
- Country: Portugal
- Region: Norte
- Intermunic. comm.: Douro
- District: Vila Real
- Municipality: Santa Marta de Penaguião

Area
  - Total: 15.67 km^{2} (6.05 sq mi)
- Elevation: 685 m (2,247 ft)

Population (2011)
  - Total: 835
  - Density: 53/km^{2} (140/sq mi)
- Time zone: UTC+00:00 (WET)
  - Summer (DST): UTC+01:00 (WEST)
- Postal code: 5030
- Area code: 254
- Patron: São Tiago

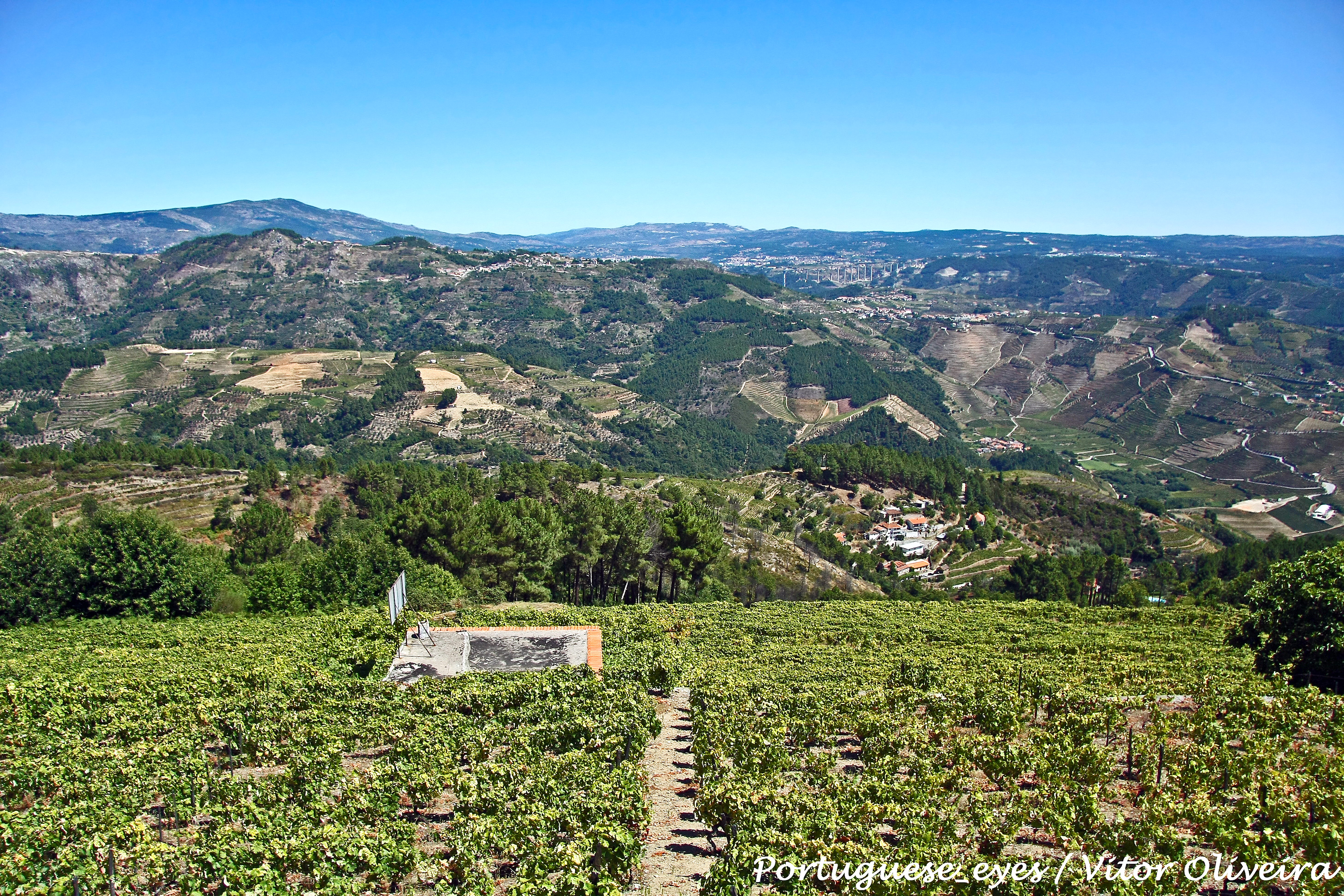
Vista do Miradouro de São Pedro

Fontes is a civil parish in the municipality of Santa Marta de Penaguião, in the northern Douro region of Portugal. The population in 2011 was 835, in an area of 15.67 km².

== History ==
An old parish, its history dates to a period when a vicarage under the Commander of Comenda and Order of Malta dominated the region. For most of its early history it fell under the dominion of the vicarage, until it much later become its own independent rectory.

Most of the parish's territory, from the chapel of São Pedro to the settlement of Crestelo, was once a primitive Castro, which suffered from later Roman colonization. The more celebrated reference of this period, was a Greco-Roman altar stone with an inscription in Latin: AUGE CILEAE MINIME VOT.L.PO.

The parish received a foral (charter) from King Sancho I of Portugal in August 1202, and later from King Afonso III of Portugal, in July 1218. King Manuel of Portugal issued a later foral on 15 December 1514, while staying in Évora, which raised the settlement status to town and municipal seat. This state lasted until the Liberal reforms of 1836.

Owing to local tradition, the chapel of the Sanctuary of Nossa Senhora do Viso, was the first parochial church raised in the parish. As documented by friar Agostinho de Santa Maria in 1716 (5 tome of his Santuário Mariano):

This temple to Our Lady, being grande and spacious, is quite perfect, not just in architecture, but also in its ornamentation: everything is covered in azulejo tile and the roof is panelled in rich paintings from the mysteries of Our Lady.

== Geography ==
Fontes is the largest territorial parish in the municipality, located eight kilometres north of the municipal seat. The parish contains the localities Crestêlo, Fontes, Justos, Póvoa da Serra, Soutelo and Tabuadelo.

== Architecture ==
=== Civic ===
- Estate of Souto (Portuguese: Quinta do Souto)
- Primary School of Fontes (Portuguese: Escola Primária de Fontes)

=== Religious ===
- Chapel of Livração (Portuguese: Capela da Ressurreição/Capela da Livração)
- Chapel of Nossa Senhora da Piedade (Portuguese: Capela de Nossa Senhora da Piedade)
- Chapel of Nossa Senhora de Fátima (Portuguese: Capela de Nossa Senhora de Fátima)
- Chapel of Nossa Senhora de Monserrate (Portuguese: Capela de Nossa Senhora de Monserrate)
- Chapel of Nossa Senhora dos Milagres (Portuguese: Capela de Nossa Senhora dos Milagres)
- Chapel of Santa Maria Madalena (Portuguese: Capela de Santa Maria Madalena)
- Chapel of Santa Quitéria (Portuguese: Capela de Santa Quitéria)
- Chapel of Santo António (Portuguese: Capela de Santo António)
- Chapel of Santo Espírito (Portuguese: Capela do Santo Espírito)
- Chapel of São Pedro (Portuguese: Capela de São Pedro/Miradouro de São Pedro)
- Chapel of São Sebastião (Portuguese: Capela de São Sebastião/Capela do Santo)
- Chapel of Senhora da Saude (Portuguese: Capela of Senhora da Saude)
- Chapel of Senhora do Viso (Portuguese: Capela da Senhora do Viso/Miradouro da Senhora do Viso)
- Church of Santiago (Portuguese: Igreja Paroquial de Fontes/Igreja de Santiago)
- Cross of Senhor dos Aflitos (Portuguese: Cruzeiro do Senhor dos Aflitos)
- Cross of Senhor do Cruzeiro e Alminhas (Portuguese: Senhor do Cruzeiro e Alminhas)
