= Favaios =

- Civil parish
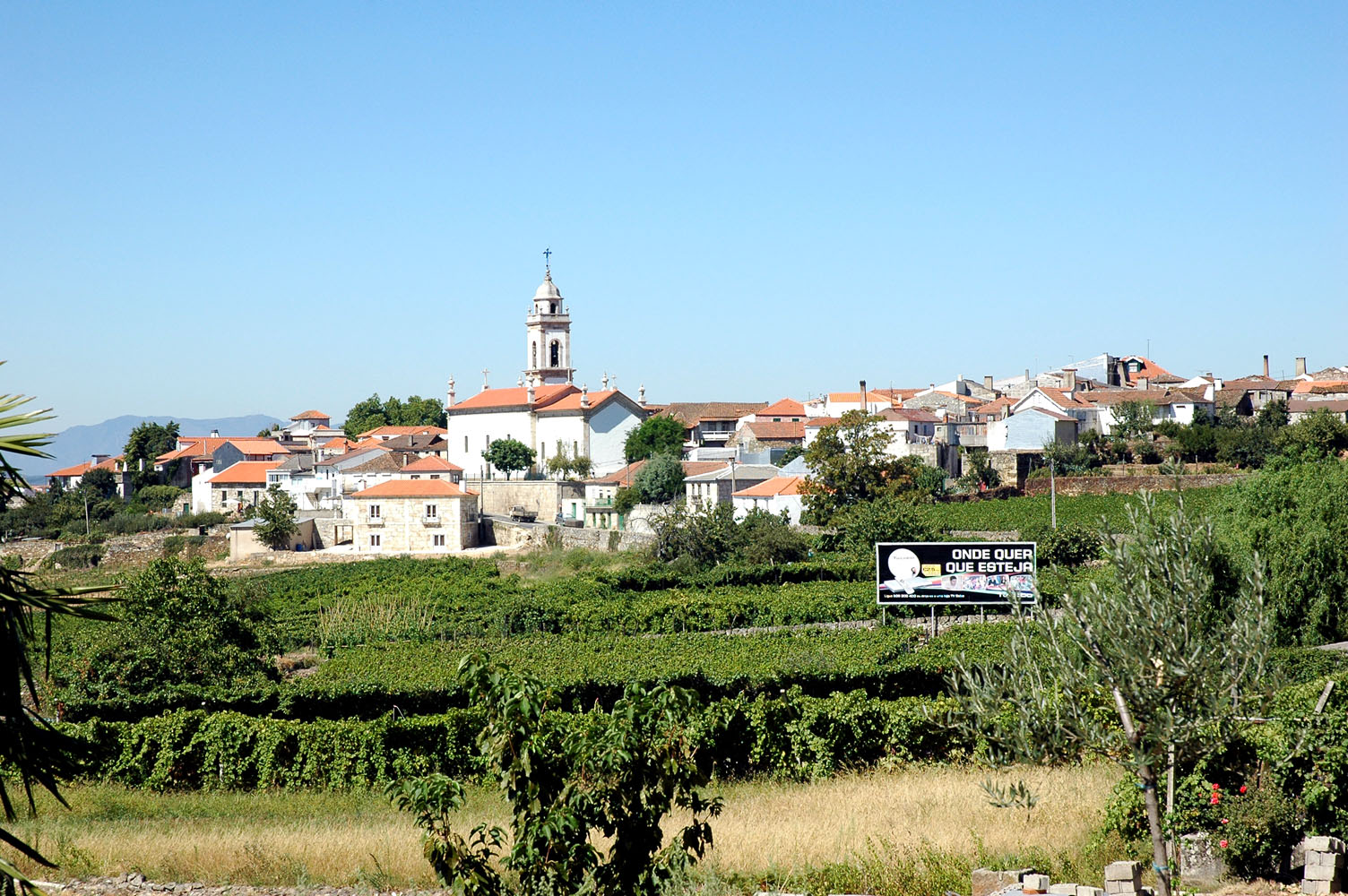

- Location in Portugal
- Coordinates: 41.267°N 7.499°W
- Country: Portugal
- Region: Norte
- Intermunic. comm.: Douro
- District: Vila Real
- Municipality: Alijó

Area
  - Total: 21.45 km^{2} (8.28 sq mi)
- Elevation: 498 m (1,634 ft)

Population (2011)
  - Total: 1,064
  - Density: 49.60/km^{2} (128.5/sq mi)
- Time zone: UTC+00:00 (WET)
  - Summer (DST): UTC+01:00 (WEST)
- Postal code: 5070
- Area code: 259
- Website: https://web.archive.org/web/20110816182334/http://freguesiadefavaios.com/

Favaios (Portuguese pronunciation: [fɐˈvajuʃ]) is a civil parish of the municipality of Alijó, in northern Portugal. The population in 2011 was 1,064, in an area of 21.45 km^{2}. The region is known for its wines, namely, the moscatels like Moscatel de Favaios.

== History ==
Favaios was occupied by Roman legions between 218 BCE and 201 BCE, who took it from the tribes of Lusitanians and Hispanic clans. The founders came from the families and relations of the Flavian dynasty, of Imperial Rome, who rose to prominence after Emperor Titus Flavius Caesar Vespasianus Augustus. The parish's name is derived from Flávios, a corruption of the original name of this leader, Flavius . Roman Flávios belonged to a vast territory known as Panoias (not to be confused with modern-day Panoias which is a small community in the municipality of Braga). Ancient Panoias extended from the river Marão to the Tua River, and from the Douro River to the current site of Murça.

The invasion of the Iberian peninsula by Arabs reached the north, where the Moors took the Roman Castle of Flávias: it would later be remembered as the "Castelo dos Mouros" (English: Castle of Moors). This occupation forced the locals to escape the region and re-established settlements away from Favaios: half the population took refuge in the area that would be renamed São Bento. From this new colony the Portuguese battled the Moors of Favaios; after the expulsion of the Moors the region was covered in the destruction of these battles. The destruction lead to a slow reconstruction of Favaios.

Favaios received in 1211 its Carta de Alforria (Charter of liberty/freedom) from King Afonso II, and its foral (charter) in 1270 by Afonso III (which was later confirmed in 1284 by King Denis). Strangely, during the reign of Manuel I the charter was revoked in 1514, to be reinstituted the following year, ordering that the local fountain be marked with the Royal shield over an armillary sphere, surmounted by a crown.

== Geography ==
With an area of 21.45 km^{2}, Favaios is located along a plateau in the Trás-os-Montes e Alto Douro province, district headed by Vila Real de Trás-os-Montes city.
