= Belver (Carrazeda de Ansiães) =

- Civil Parish
- Etymology: Portuguese for beautiful sight
- Interactive map of Belver
- Coordinates: 41°14′59″N 7°16′1″W
- Country: Portugal
- Region: Norte
- Subregion: Douro
- District: Bragança
- Municipality: Carrazeda de Ansiães
- Settlement: fl. 1100

Area
  - Total: 10.39 km^{2} (4.01 sq mi)
- Elevation: 775 m (2,543 ft)

Population (2001)
  - Total: 361
  - Density: 34.7/km^{2} (90.0/sq mi)
- Time zone: UTC0 (WET)
  - Summer (DST): UTC+1 (WEST)
- Postal Zone: 5140-031
- Area code: (+351) 278 XXX XXX
- Demonym: Belverenses
- Patron Saint: Nossa Senhora das Neves
- Statistics from INE (2001); geographic detail from Instituto Geográfico Português (2010)

Belver is a former civil parish in the municipality of Carrazeda de Ansiães, Portugal. In 2013, the parish merged into the new parish Belver e Mogo de Malta. It is situated two kilometres northeast from the municipal seat.

== History ==
There are few ancient references to the parishes history, but those uncovered suggest that the area was settled in the 12th century.

The term Belver is a contraction of Bel(lo) Ver, which means beautiful sight, and may likely refer to the region's panoramic vistas. The settlement of Mogo de Ansiães, along an extensive plateau, near the parish seat is a mark of demarcation (mogo means mark) that delimited the parish seat. The historical limits of Carrazeda de Ansiães (and the neighbouring municipality of Freixiel) precisely divided along the space between Mogo de Ansiãse and Mogo de Malta. It is likely that a mark (a mogo) divided the two places, thusby deriving their names.

The church was constructed in the 16th century, and by 1706 (from the writings of Father Carvalho da Costa), it was under the authority of the Rector of Ansiães. The settlement, which included 50 neighbours, was under the protection of the Comenda do Salvador.

Between 1864 and 1865, Belver had 137 homes and 475 inhabitants.

On 15 July 1903, the first primary school for boys was established in Belver.

It was in 1950 that the population reached its historical maximum: 549 inhabitants.

== Geography ==
Between 1960 and 1970 there was marked decrease in the population, a natural effect of emigration (typical of other Transmontanan communities during this period). After 1970, with the advent of better communication links, these numbers reversed themselves, as more of the population remained in the region. This created population in-filling between Belver and Mogo de Ansiães, integrating this small settlement within Belver. This was helped by improved transit from Vilarinho da Castanheira, Lousa, Castedo and much of its frontier with Moncorvo, around the Penafria-Fontelonga roadway.

== Economy ==
The principal economic activity in this region is agriculture, supported by the harvesting of chestnuts, walnuts, grapes, cereal crops, potatoes and some fields that sustain apple orchards, while the raising of sheep is common in the pasturelands. Industry and commerce, although growing, is relatively low, supporting traditional pottery, saw-milling and carpentry. Other functions in the villages include mechanical garages, cafés and a gas station.

Interest in tourist-based economic activities has also helped the remodelling and reconstruction of many of the local buildings, as has the influx of funds after the Carnation Revolution, which helped to modernize many of the local services. These have included the remodelling of the churches, a new cemetery, Casa do Povo, children's playground and primary school, and the construction of the Centro de Dia de Nossa Senhora da Saúde (seniors day centre).

== Architecture ==
=== Civic ===
- Primary School of Belver (Portuguese: Escola Primária de Belver) - typical rural schoolhouse, part of the Novo Plano dos Centenários, consisting of a rectangular hall, oriented to the south, that included a vestibule and bathroom to the rear. In 1956, architect Fernando Peres elaborated an integrated study, that established the types and dimensions of schools, washrooms, simplifying the construction, which resulted in the 1960 construction of the schoolhouse. On 17 April 2006 a protocol was signed between the municipal council and the Liga dos Amigos de Belver (League of the Friends of Belver) to cede the schoolhouse to the association on the close of school activities (caused by the reduction of school children).
- Fountain and Communal Washtank of Belver (Portuguese: Fonte e Lavadouros de Belver) - is located in the main square with the Junta de Freguesia, an intersection of two principal roads in the village of Belver, the rectangular fountain, built and surrounded by granite blocks with lateral washbasins, its front façade is inscribed with "1924" (when it was built) and surmounted with cornices and frieses

=== Religious ===
- Chapel of Santo Cristo (Portuguese: Capela do Santo Cristo) - located alongside Rua Marechal Gomes da Costa in the village of Belver, the 16th century one-nave granite chapel's front façade is surmounted by a central bell-tower within a Roman arch and Latin cross (the cross duplicated on the rear). Meanwhile, the simple interior of the chapel is painted in white, while the floor is granite stone, and on the far wall, elevated above two steps the double-face altar.
- Church of Nossa Senhora das Neves (Portuguese: Igreja Paroquial de Belver/Igreja de Nossa Senhora das Neves) – likely constructed in the 16th century, this building is a much larger representation of the smaller Chapel, which occupies the same land in the village of Belver. The church, constructed of granite, includes a structure of grande simplicity, with a front façade that terminates in a truncated double-bell-tower at its apex (a clock tower shares this façade). The interior single-nave arched roof is covered in regionalist paintings of the saints and apostles, while ornate lateral altars and main altar are covered in goldleaf wood-carvings and surmount marble altarpieces. The floor, baptismal font and side pulpit are carved into granite.
