= Prehistoric Rock-Art Site of Pala Pinta =

Cave and archaeological site in Portugal

- Interactive map of Prehistoric Rock-Art Site of Pala Pinta
- Type: Prehistoric art
- Location: Vila Real, Douro, Norte, Portugal

Site notes
- Archaeologists: unknown
- Owner: Portuguese Republic
- Public access: Private Carlão, from the municipal road until Franzilhal

The Prehistoric Rock-Art Site Pala Pinta (Portuguese: Abrigo rupestre da Pala Pinta) is a Paleolithic-era rock-art site, recognized for cave paintings in the Portuguese municipality of Alijó, in the civil parish of Carlão e Amieiro.

== History ==
The cave was occupied during the 3rd millennium, and the rock art paintings were likely created during this period.

After its discovery, on 30 December 1985, there was a move by the Serviço Regional de Arqueologia da Zona Norte (North Zone Regional Archaeological Service) to have the site classified for protection. There was a positive reaction on 21 April 1986 to the endeavour by the Consultative Council of IPPC. Further initiatives were undertaken on 7 May by the Secretária de Estado da Cultura (Secretary-of-State for Culture) to classify the archaeological site as a National Monument. Although this was never promulgated, on 18 July 2006, the area was defined as a Zona Especial de Classificação (Special Classification Zone) by the DRPorto.

== Architecture ==
It was situated in an isolated, rural area in the middle of the hilltop facing the east.

The site includes rock-art paintings over granite surface, covering an area of 12 metres (39 ft) long and 2.50 metres (8.2 ft) high. There roughly two vertical panels, caused by fractures in the cave/clifftop, consisting of monochromatic paintings in ochre of radial imagery (likely sun or stars), points and anthropomorphic representations of figures.
