= Murça Municipal Chamber =

Legislative body of Murça

Coordinates: 41.40836°N 7.45382°W

Murça Municipal Chamber Câmara Municipal de Murça
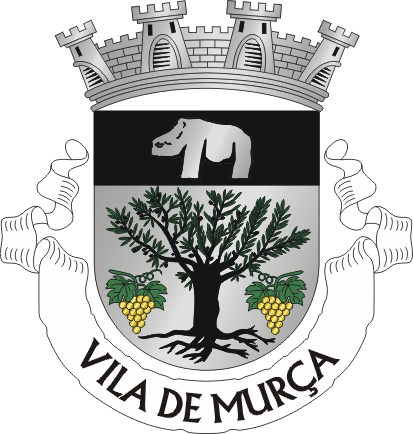
- Coat of arms of the town of Murça

Type
- Type: Câmara municipal
- Term limits: 3

History
- Founded: 8 May 1224; 801 years ago

Leadership
- President: Mário Artur Lopes, PSD since 20 October 2021
- Vice President: Avelino José Marques dos Santos, PSD since 20 October 2021

Structure
- Seats: 5
- Political groups: Municipal Executive (3) PSD (3) Opposition (2) PS (2)
- Length of term: Four years

Elections
- Last election: 26 September 2021
- Next election: Sometime between 22 September and 14 October 2025

Meeting place
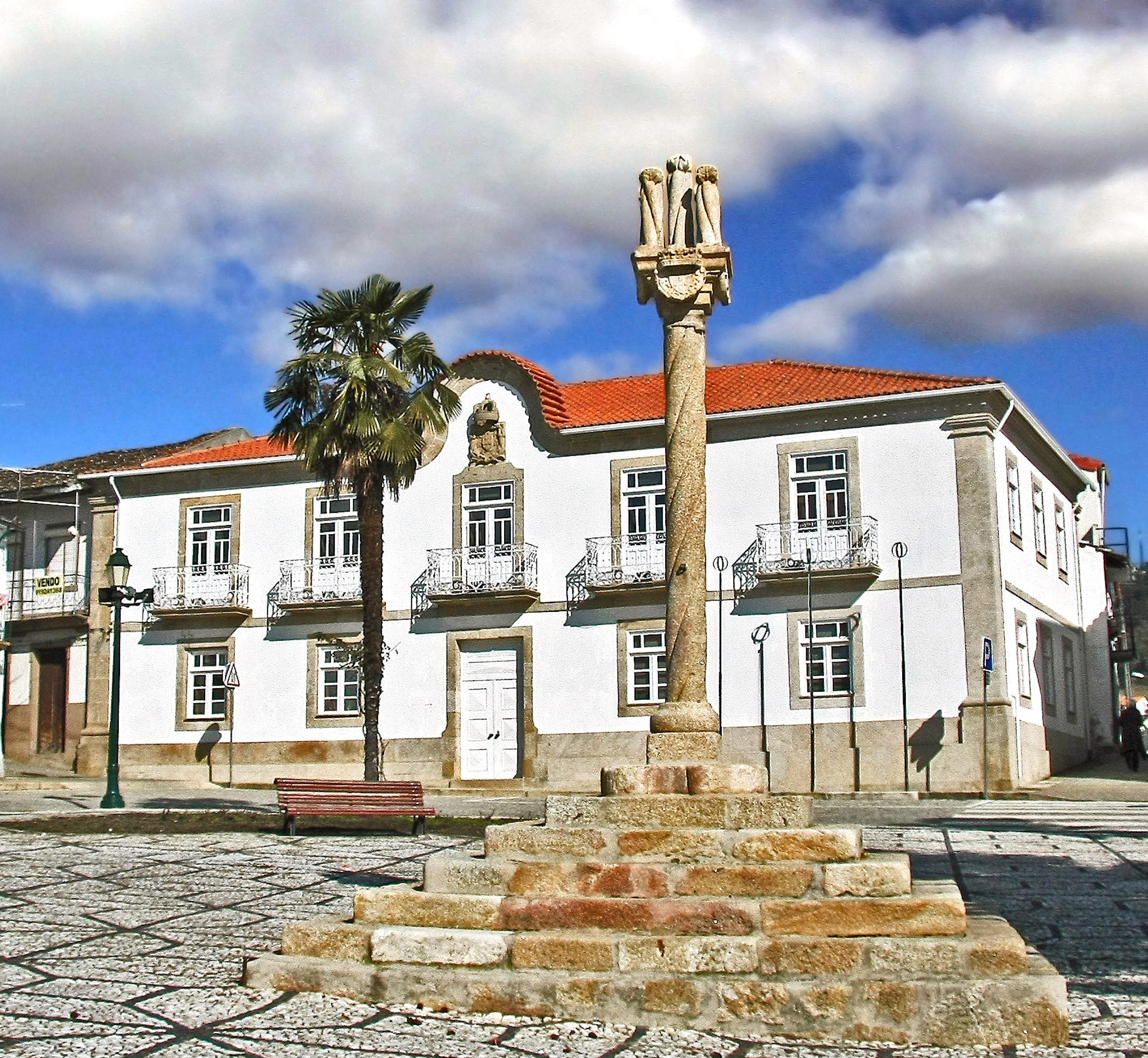
- Paços do Concelho de Murça

Website
- www.cm-murca.pt

The Murça Municipal Chamber (Portuguese: Câmara Municipal de Murça) is the administrative authority in the municipality of Murça. It has 7 freguesias in its area of jurisdiction and is based in the town of Murça, on the Vila Real District. These freguesias are: Candedo; Carva e Vilares; Fiolhoso; Jou; Murça; Noura e Palheiros and Valongo de Milhais.

The Murça City Council is made up of 5 councillors, representing, currently, two different political forces. The first candidate on the list with the most votes in a municipal election or, in the event of a vacancy, the next candidate on the list, takes office as President of the Municipal Chamber.

== List of the Presidents of the Municipal Chamber of Murça ==
- Joaquim Ferreira Torres – (1971–1974)
- ??? – (1974–1976)
- Cândido Abel Borges – (1976–1979)
- António Constantino Pereira – (1979–1981)
- Alexandre Teixeira – (1981–1982)
- Belmiro Morais Vilela – (1982–1993)
- José Gomes – (1993–2001)
- João Teixeira Fernandes – (2001–2013)
- José Maria Garcia Lopes – (2013–2017)
- Mário Artur Lopes – (2017–2025)

(The list is incomplete)
