= Pópulo e Ribalonga =

- Civil parish
- Location in Portugal
- Coordinates: 41.37°N 7.50°W
- Country: Portugal
- Region: Norte
- Intermunic. comm.: Douro
- District: Vila Real
- Municipality: Alijó

Area
  - Total: 21.30 km^{2} (8.22 sq mi)

Population (2011)
  - Total: 508
  - Density: 24/km^{2} (62/sq mi)
- Time zone: UTC+00:00 (WET)
  - Summer (DST): UTC+01:00 (WEST)

Pópulo e Ribalonga is a civil parish in the municipality of Alijó, Portugal. It was formed in 2013 by the merger of the former parishes Pópulo and Ribalonga. The population in 2011 was 508, in an area of 21.30 km^{2}.
