= Castle of Carrazeda de Ansiães =

Castle in Carrazeda de Ansiães, Portugal

- Castelo de Carrazeda de Ansiães
- Bragança, Douro, Norte in Portugal
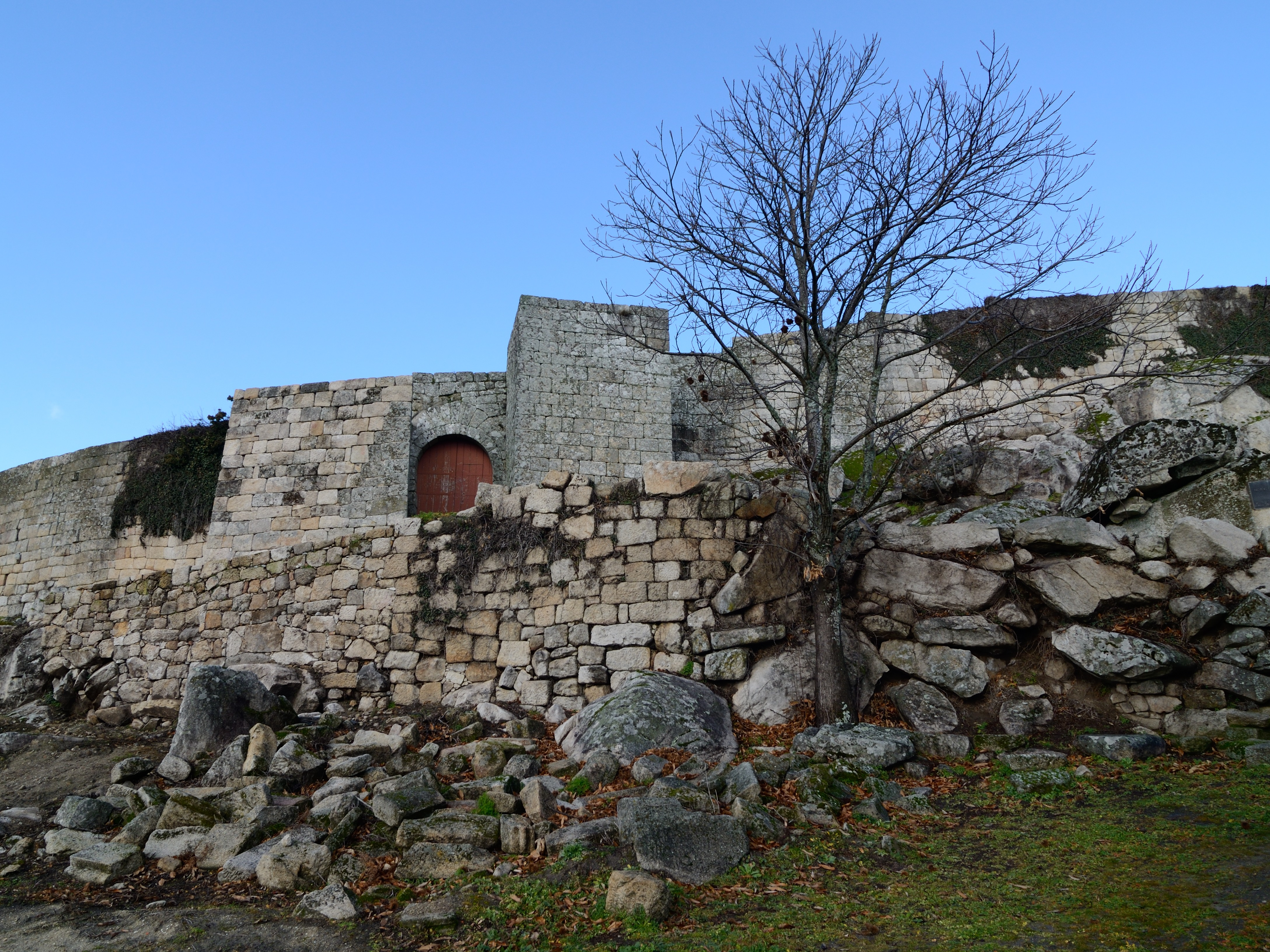
- Castle of Carrazeda de Ansiães in 2012

Site information
- Type: Castle
- Owner: Portuguese Republic
- Open to the public: Public

Location
- Coordinates: 41°12′9.93″N 7°18′19.95″W

Site history
- Built: 3000 BCE
- Materials: Mortar, Granite, Cement, Wood, Iron

The Castle of Carrazeda de Ansiães (Portuguese: Castelo de Carrazeda de Ansiães), normally shortened to Castle of Ansiães, is a medieval castle in the civil parish of Lavandeira, municipality of Carrazeda de Ansiães of Portugal.

The castle ruins, whose structure is easy to reconstitute, includes a few peculiarities, such as small Traitors' Gate alongside the keep tower, and remnants of barbicans along the walls, in addition to examples of primitive cisterns in relative good state (although obstructed). The Castle of Ansiães and that of Vila Flor complement each other: both implanted in a protected zone, on small plateaus between cordillera and three peaks.

== History ==
=== Antiquity ===
The first remnants recorded on this site date to the Chalcolithic period approximately 3000 BCE, and were the basis for the early Roman settlement that developed. This ended with the sack of Carrazeda de Ansiães by northern barbarians in 409.

This was followed by the conquest of the region by Muslim forces in 711. The settlement escaped attacks by the Leonese forces during the 11th century, but, its position near Christian kingdoms meant that a fortification was required to protect their settlement. Yet, by 1057, the first Christian Foral Charter was instituted by the Ferdinand I of León and Castile, insinuating the fall of the Moorish fortress; the foral constituted one of the oldest geographic forals, defining the extent of Portuguese borders. During the High Middle Ages, the location already possessed a long cultural heritage, a factor that allowed it to become a fulcrum along the Douro River. Consequently, in subsequent centuries, the region experienced an exponential growth within the walled settlement.

=== Medieval era ===
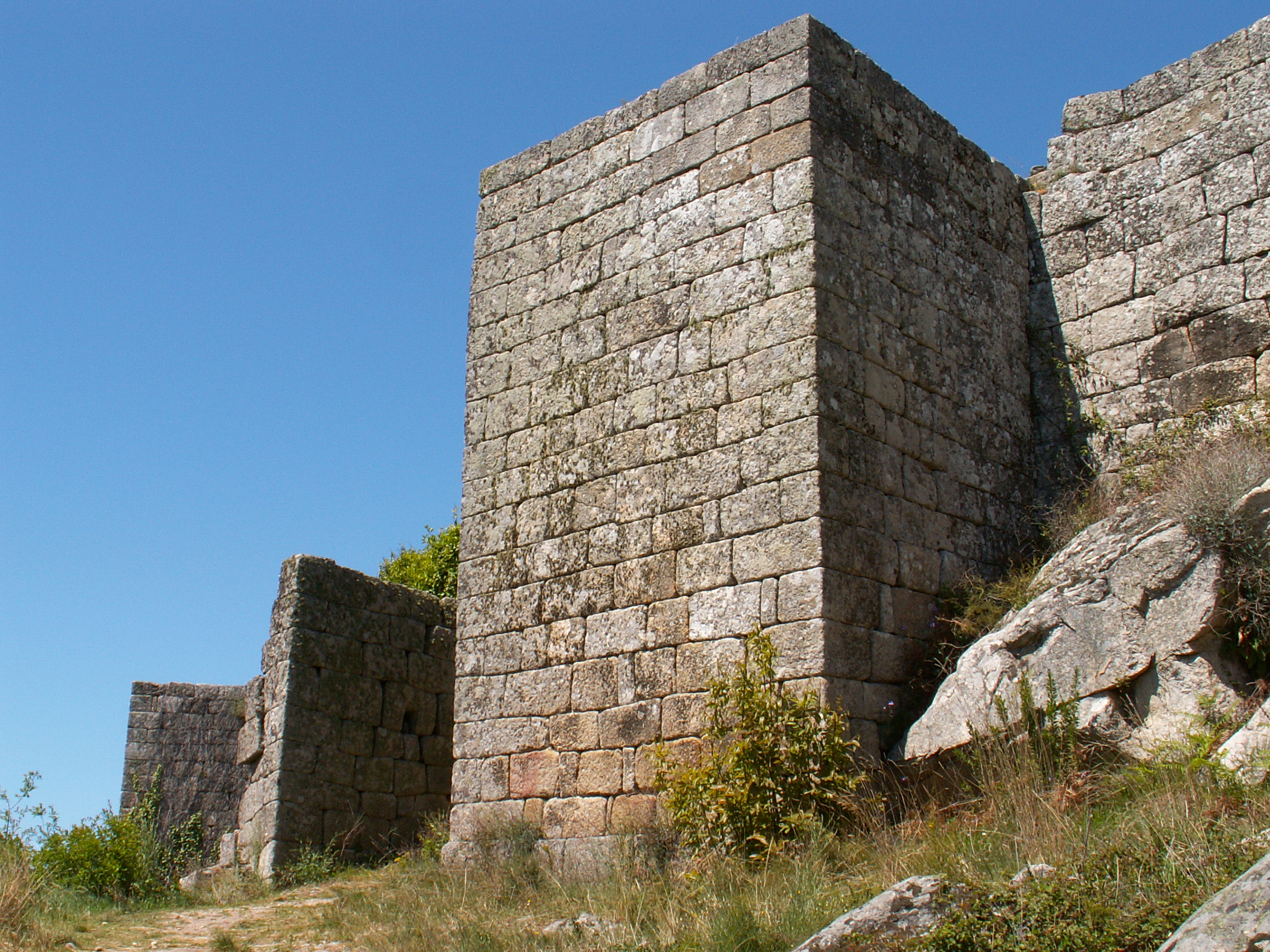
The castle walls stand against time since the medieval era

In 1160, the first King of Portugal Afonso Henriques conferred the first Portuguese Foral charter, later re-confirmed and validated on 6 April 1198, by his successor King Sancho I, and again in April 1219, by King Afonso II. The village progressively imposed its importance in the territory it belonged, which included diverse resources, a proliferation of small agglomerations and agricultural parcels. It was in this context that in 1277, King Afonso III issued a charter to allow a fair in Ansiães.

King Ferdinand gave the town of Carrazeda de Ansiães to João Rodrigo Porto Carrero, in 1372. But, João Rodrigues took up arms for the Kingdom of León and Castile, which would only be settled in the Treaty of Badajoz in 1382.

Between 1384 and 1496, a letter in the localities of Freixial, Murça and Abreiro obligated the transfer of customs dues to the construction of the new castle. But, in order to quicken the construction these funds were supported by the church funds. In 1443, the regent Peter funnelled the taxes from Freixiel, Abreiro and Vilarinho da Castanheira to support the repair of the walls of the castle.

On 11 June 1510, King Manuel of Portugal issued a new foral to Carrazeda de Ansiães, yet transferred the castle to Rui Dias de Sampaio in 1516. By 1527, the village consisted of 35 inhabited buildings, yet the lack of potable water, relative distance to fertile terrains and principal roadways, resulted in the castle's progressive abandon. Between 1580 and 1591 the walls were repaired by the royal taxes, which was later complemented by local efforts to reinforce these walls in 1640. The final part of the 15th century, and in particular the 16th century, marked the beginning of a demographic transformation, resulting in an accentuated urban loss to the periphery. In the following centuries this movement worsened, culminating in the transference of the municipal seat to Carrazeda, in 1734. By the 19th century, the settlement within the castle walls was finally abandoned.

On 1 June 1992, the property was transferred to the IPPAR Instituto Português do Património Arquitectónico (Portuguese Institute for Architectural Patrimony), under decree-law 106F/92, before these competencies were agglomerated by the Instituto de Gestão do Património Arquitectónico e Arqueológico (Institute for the Management of Architectural and Archaeological Heritage). In order to re-appropriate the historical importance of the site, in 1995, the Projecto Arqueológico do Castelo de Ansiães (Archaeological Project for the Castle of Ansiães), by the Grupo de Estudos de História da Viticultura Duriense e do Vinho do Porto (GEHVID) (Study Group for the Douro Viticulture and Porto Wine), financed by the GEHVID and municipal council was initiated. The first excavations on site occurred between 1996 and 1998, occurring in the interior and exterior perimeter walls, under the supervision of archaeologist Luís Pereira.

The DGEMN Direcção Geral dos Edifícios e Monumentos Nacionais (General-Directorate for Buildings and National Monuments) was active in the recuperation of the walls in 1944-1945 and 1976, with consolidation of the western towers occurring in 1977.

In 2004, a reception centre was constructed.

== Architecture ==
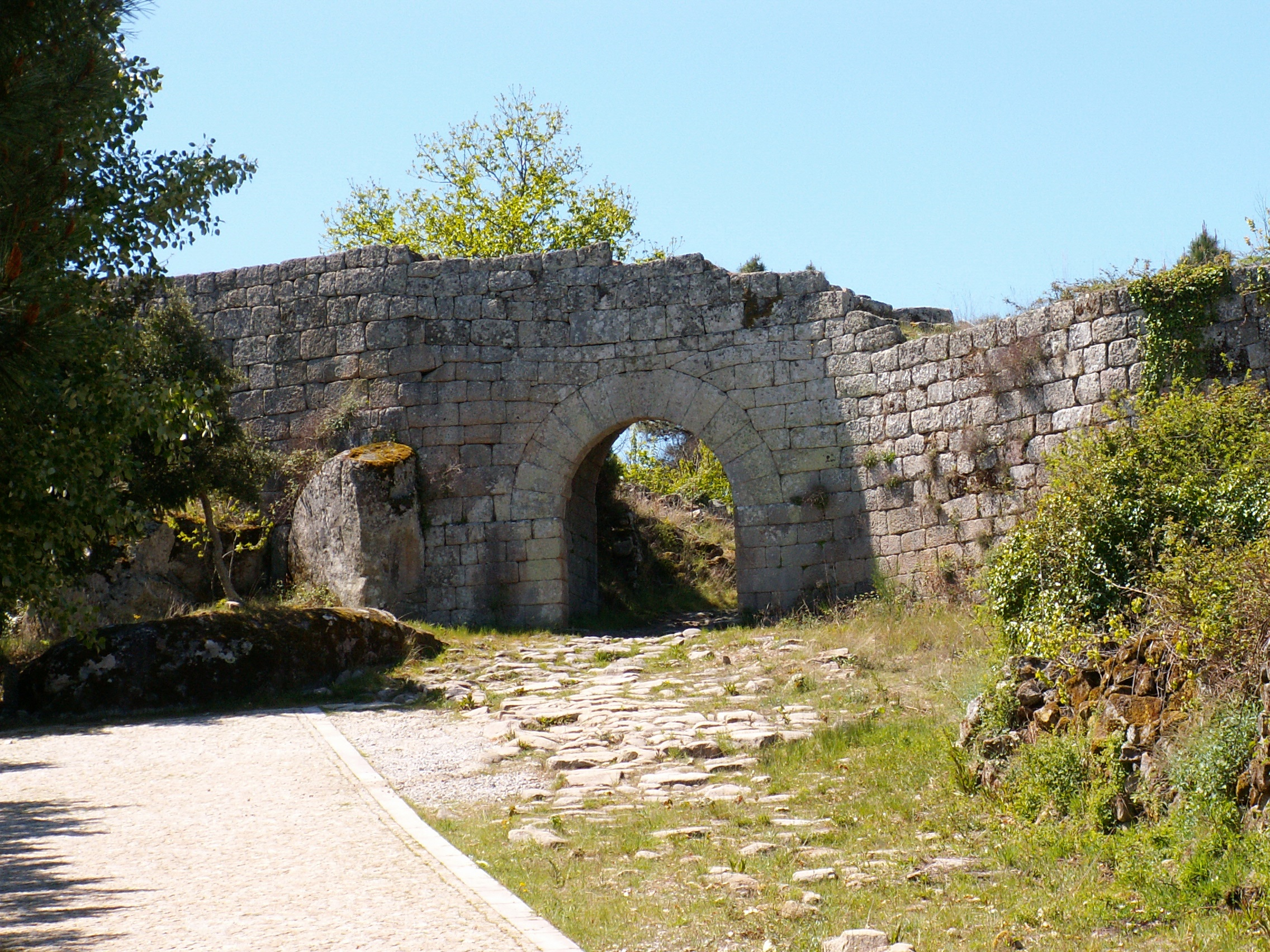

The ruins are located in a rural, isolated position, between the mountainous Serra da Vila, encircled by zones of vegetation, and 200 metres (660 ft) from an area of cultivatable lands. The space rests atop a small plateau, above which is a small cordillera and blow a sequence of smaller mounts. About 40 metres (130 ft) from the castle's entrance lies the ruins of the Convent of São João, which dates from the Roman epoch, and within the exterior walls exists the Church of São Salvador.

The remains of the fortification are granite and mortar, consisting of an irregular, oval-shaped wall with a thickness of 2.65 metres (8.7 ft) and whose height is a maximum 6.6 metres (22 ft). A smaller redoubt in an elevated part of the site forms a quadrilateral.

The interior courtyard has a Roman arch entrance to the south (São Salvador Gate), consisting of two rows of staves, the inner more narrow and wide, guarded by two rectangular towers: the left is partially destroyed and the other the keep tower, to the north, square-shaped with two floors, flanked by a smallTraitors' Gate.

In this perimeter are vestiges of a cistern (actually obstructed) with vaulted-ceiling of granite, abutting the cliff-side. Another vaulted cistern was dismantled by the IPPC Instituto Português do Património Cultural (Portuguese Institute for Cultural Patrimony), but never reconstructed, much like the Torre dos Lameiros, which is actually destroyed.

An interior courtyard, also ovular, encircled the old town, creating a second defensive perimeter, while in the east and south, the granite cliffs completed the defensive lines. Here there are visible remains of homes and cubical-spaces, some with barbicans. This defensive zone is served by Fonte Vedra Gate to the south (a Roman arch doorway), while in the east is the principal entrance with access to Lavandeira, referred to as the Porta da Vila Gate. To the west are the São João and the São Francisco Gates, with their own stone roads that converge at the town centre.

In reality, there continue to be two perceptible and distinct spaces constituting the principal elements of the medieval form of Carrazeda de Ansiães. The first, situated on the higher elevations, corresponds to the primitive trebuchets. This perimeter is defined and organized around the ovular walls, reinforced by five rectangular towers. It is still possible to recognize the group of structural vestiges, such as the keep and the respective annexes. It is also in this space that the cistern is located, which presumes the presences of older buildings of a military function. This is a defensive specialization, destined for the shelter and protection of its residents. The second space is defined by an urbanized area. A second line of walls, 600 metres (2,000 ft) in length and three rectangular towers, encircling a perimeter that is proliferated by large damage, including medieval and modern structures. The urban organization, its plan, is centered on various roads that intercept each other, structuring the small barrios and residential areas of the community.
