= Belver e Mogo de Malta =

- Civil parish
- Location in Portugal
- Coordinates: 41.25°N 7.27°W
- Country: Portugal
- Region: Norte
- Intermunic. comm.: Douro
- District: Bragança
- Municipality: Carrazeda de Ansiães

Area
  - Total: 19.80 km^{2} (7.64 sq mi)

Population (2011)
  - Total: 433
  - Density: 21.9/km^{2} (56.6/sq mi)
- Time zone: UTC+00:00 (WET)
  - Summer (DST): UTC+01:00 (WEST)

Belver e Mogo de Malta is a civil parish in the municipality of Carrazeda de Ansiães, Portugal. It was formed in 2013 by the merger of the former parishes Belver and Mogo de Malta. The population in 2011 was 433, in an area of 19.80 km^{2} (7.64 sq mi).
