= Candedo =

Candedo may refer to the following places in Portugal:

- Candedo (Murça), a parish in the municipality of Murça
- Candedo (Vinhais), a parish in the municipality of Vinhais
