= São Mamede de Ribatua =

Civil Parish of Alijó, Portugal

- Civil parish
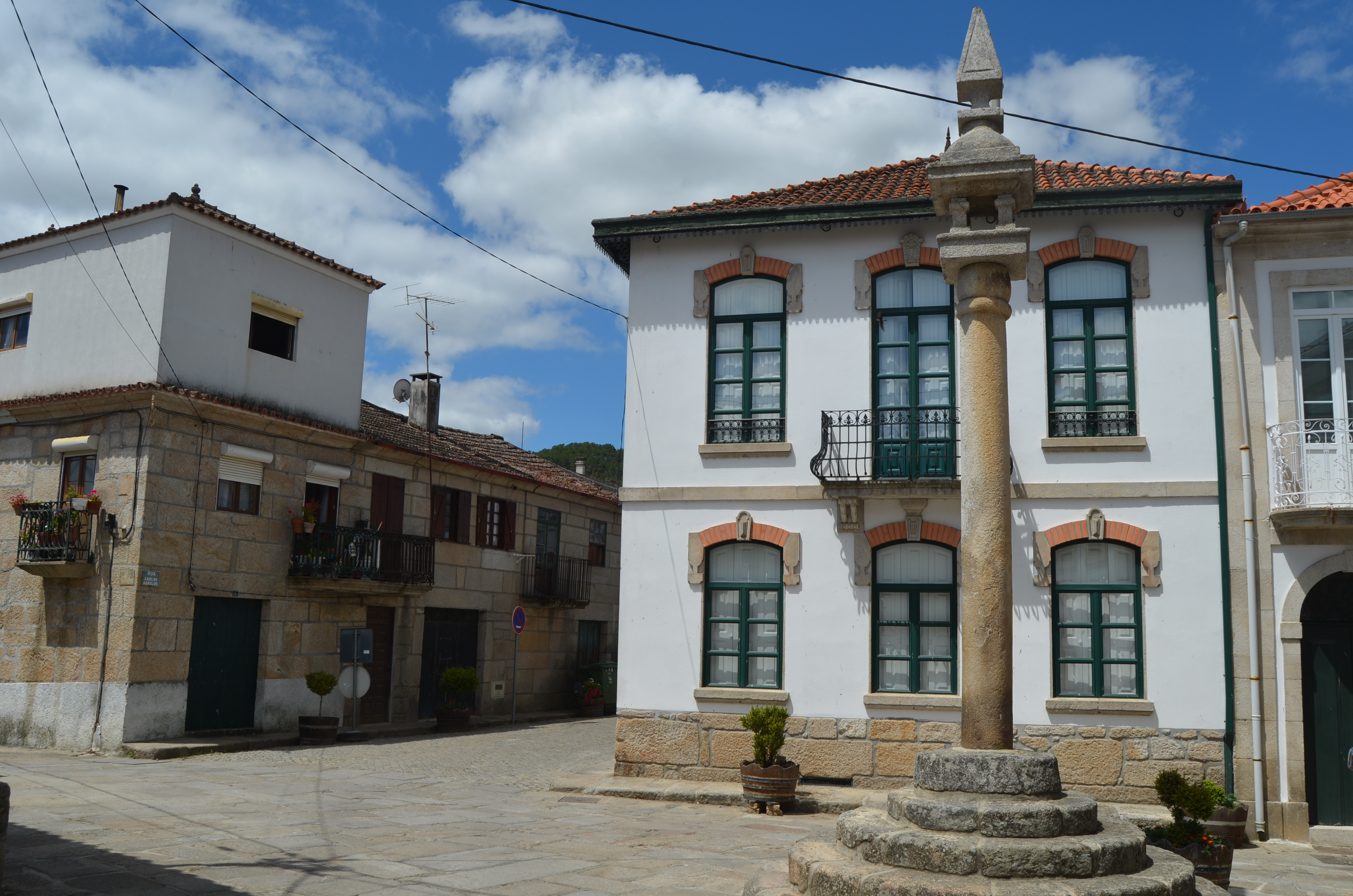

- Location in Portugal
- Coordinates: region:PT dim:100000 41.251991°N 7.31713°W
- Country: Portugal
- Region: Norte
- Intermunic. comm.: Douro
- District: Vila Real
- Municipality: Alijó

Area
  - Total: 20.11 km^{2} (7.76 sq mi)

Population (2021)
  - Total: 586
  - Density: 29.1/km^{2} (75.5/sq mi)
- Time zone: UTC+00:00 (WET)
  - Summer (DST): UTC+01:00 (WEST)

São Mamede de Ribatua is a freguesia (civil parish) of Alijó municipality, in Portugal. It has an area of 20.11 km^{2}. In 2011, the population of the parish was 728. In 2021 the population was 586.
