= Jou (Murça) =

- Civil parish
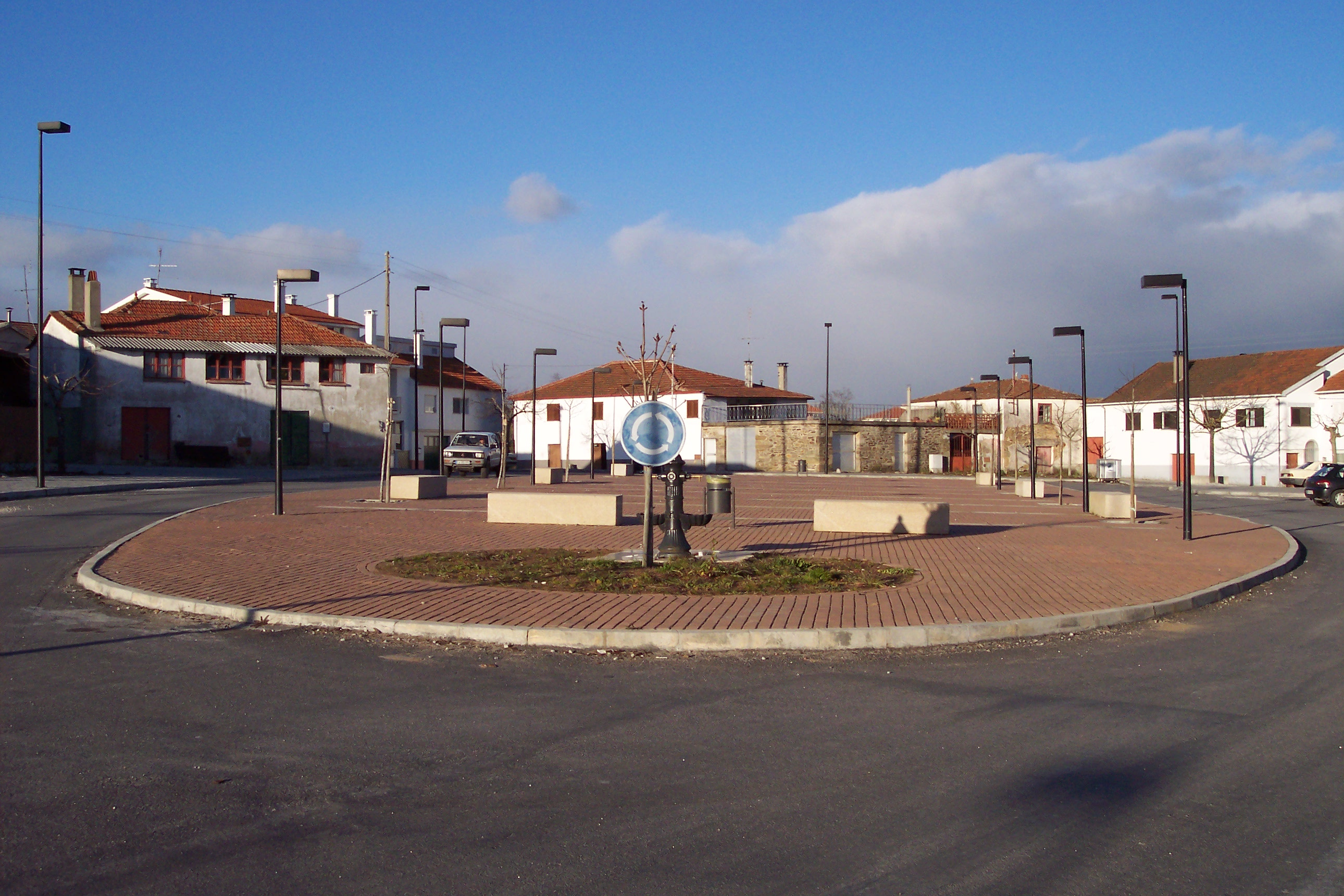
- A roundabout in Jou

- Location in Portugal
- Coordinates: 41.487°N 7.433°W
- Country: Portugal
- Region: Norte
- Intermunic. comm.: Douro
- District: Vila Real
- Municipality: Murça

Area
  - Total: 37.29 km^{2} (14.40 sq mi)

Population (2011)
  - Total: 654
  - Density: 17.5/km^{2} (45.4/sq mi)
- Time zone: UTC+00:00 (WET)
  - Summer (DST): UTC+01:00 (WEST)

Jou is a parish of the municipality of Murça, Vila Real District, in northeast Portugal. The population in 2011 was 654, in an area of 37.29 km^{2}.

== Toponymy ==
The name Jou is of uncertain origin. Portuguese linguist José-Pedro Machado, proposed a plausible Latin genitive case in Jovis, meaning «relating to Jupiter (the deity)». During Roman times, large deposits of tin were mined in this region - historically a metal considered sacred when venerating the Roman god Jupiter.
