= Carrazeda de Ansiães =

- Municipality
- Town of Carrazeda de Ansiães
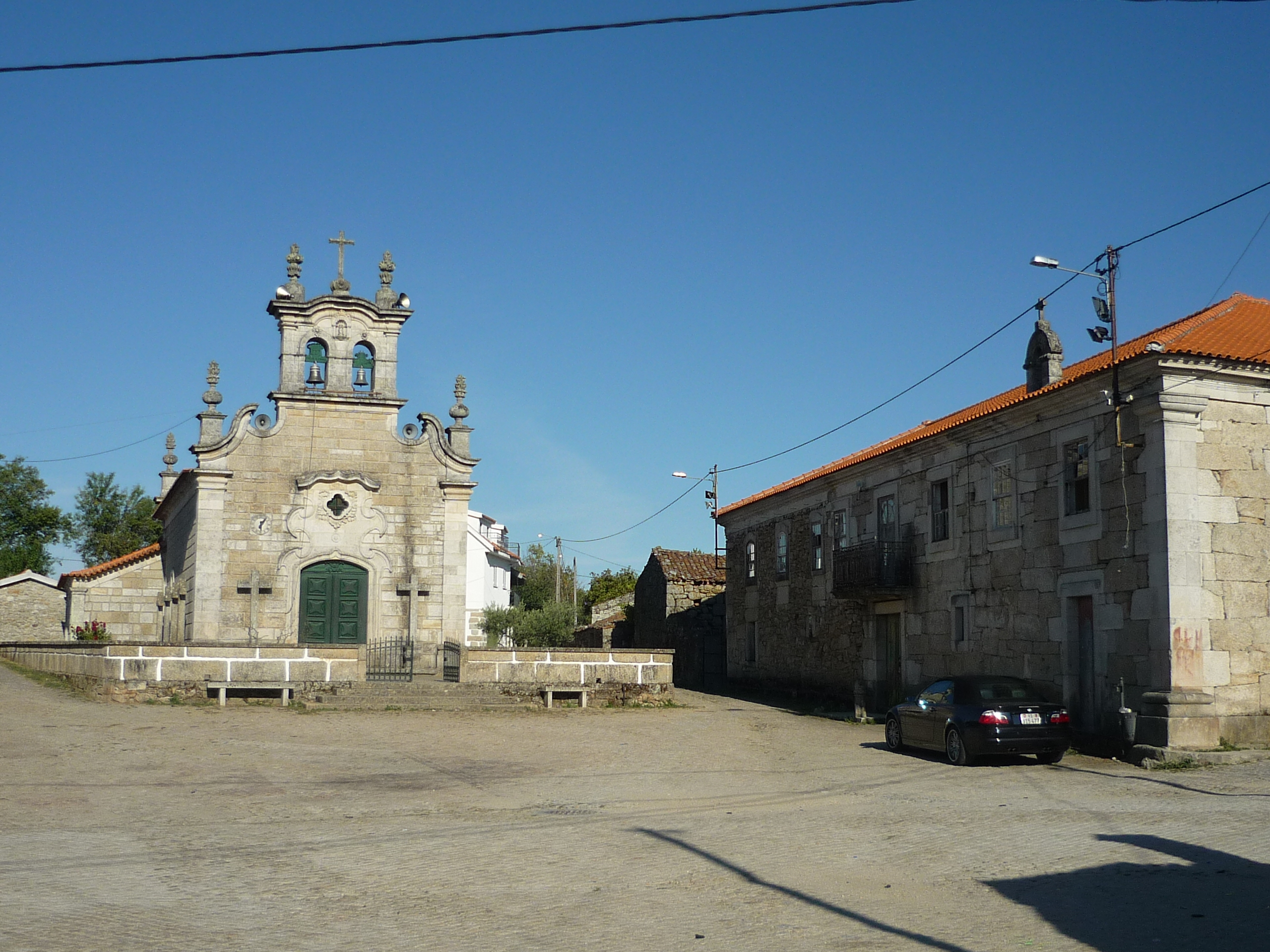
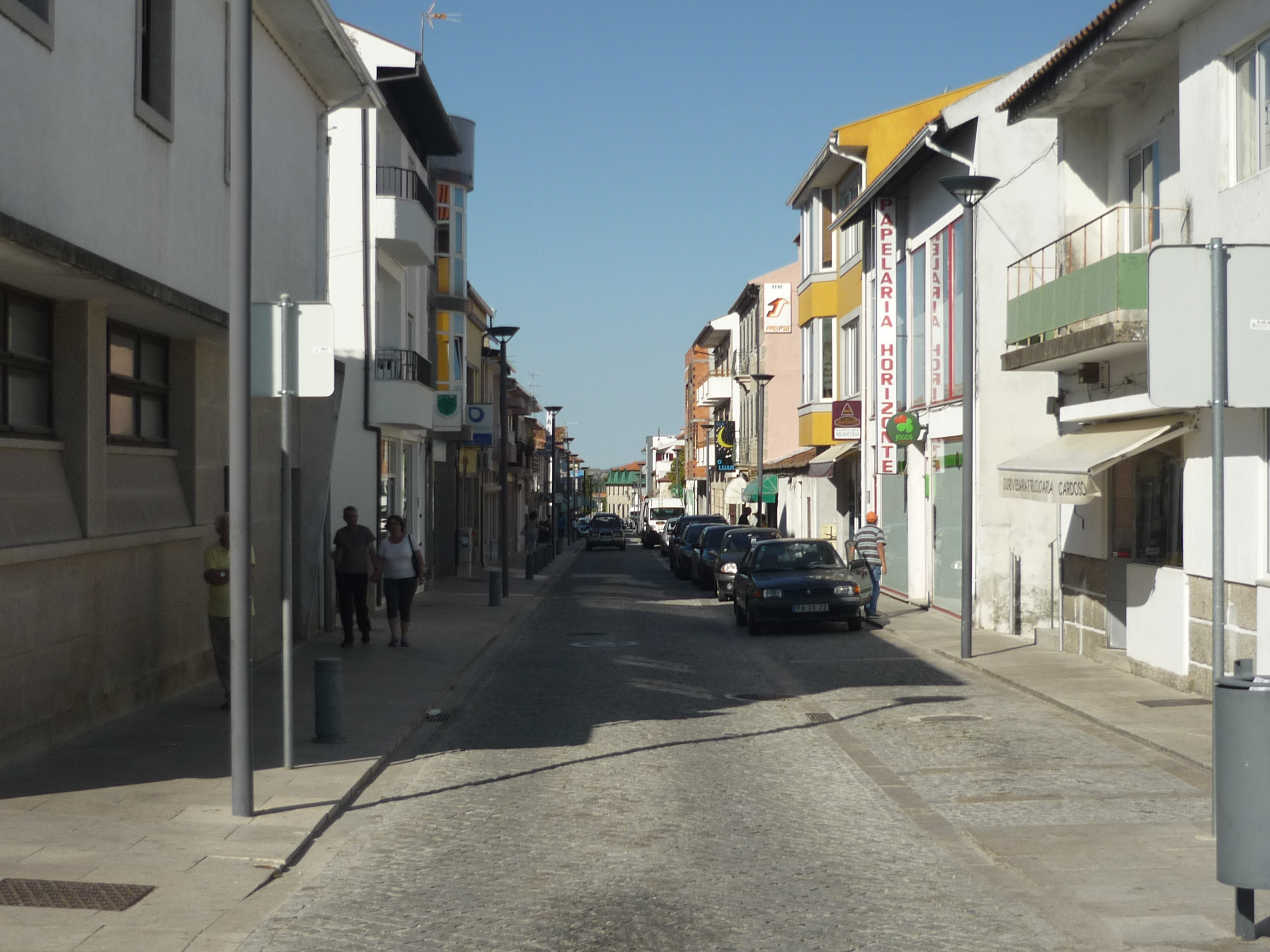
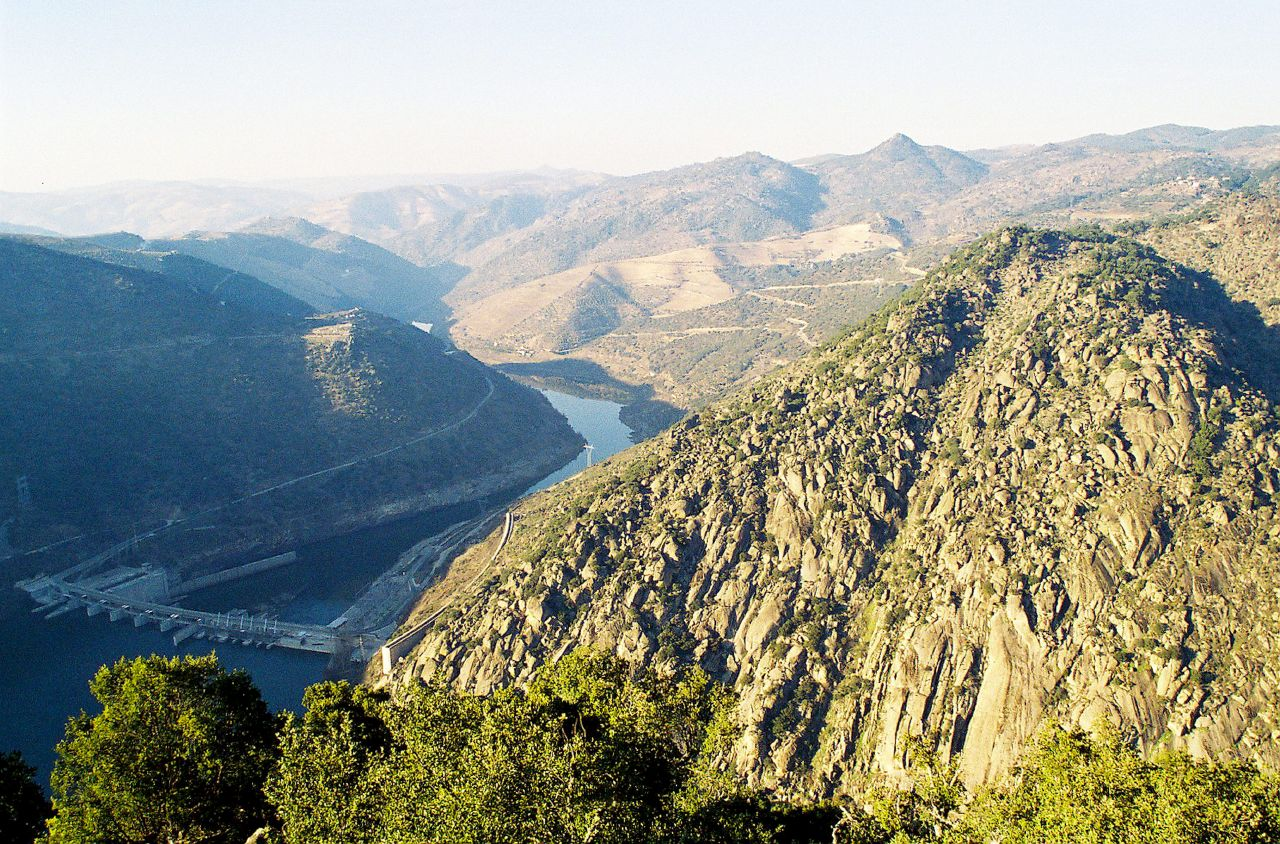
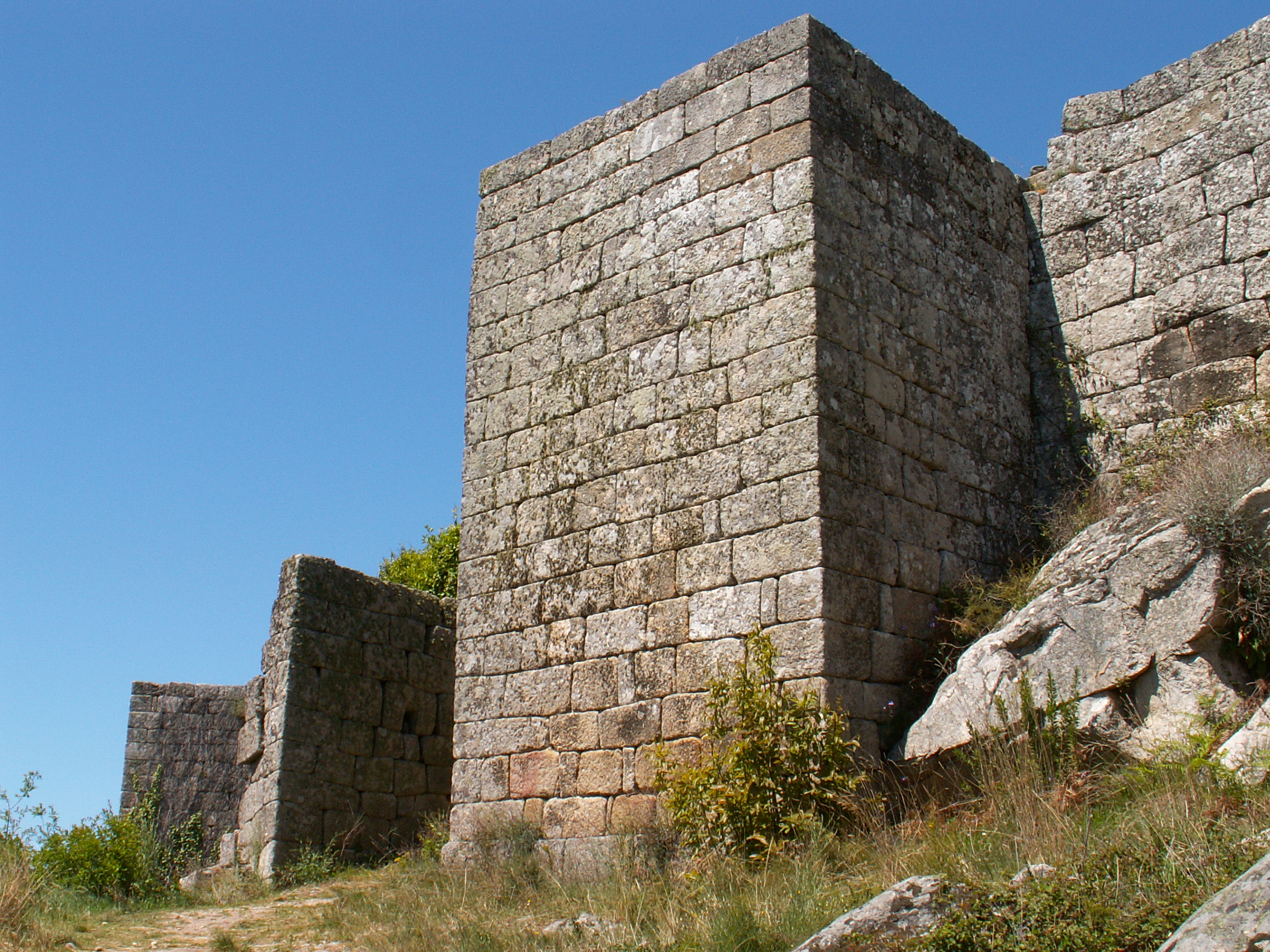
- From top left to right: Parochial church of Marzagão, street in Carrazeda, Douro Valley, Castle of Carrazeda de Ansiães.

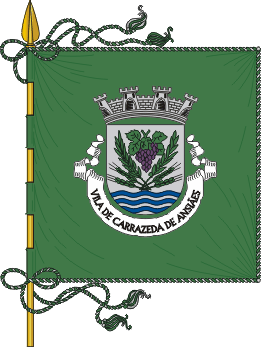
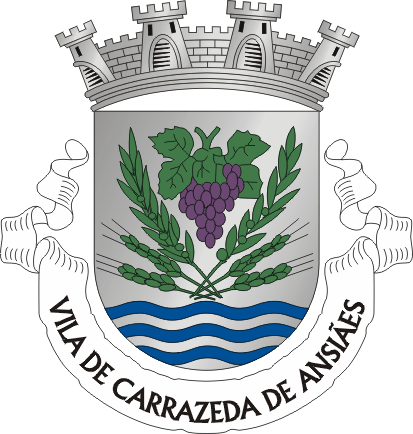
- Flag Coat of arms
- Interactive map of Carrazeda de Ansiães
- Location in Portugal
- Coordinates: 41°14′33″N 7°18′21″W
- Country: Portugal
- Region: Norte
- Intermunic. comm.: Douro
- District: Bragança
- Parishes: 14

Government
  - President: José Luís Correia (PS)

Area
  - Total: 279.24 km^{2} (107.82 sq mi)
- Elevation: 770 m (2,530 ft)

Population (2011)
  - Total: 6,373
  - Density: 22.82/km^{2} (59.11/sq mi)
- Time zone: UTC+00:00 (WET)
  - Summer (DST): UTC+01:00 (WEST)
- Postal code: 5140
- Area code: 278
- Patron: Santa Maria Maior
- Website: www.cm-carrazedadeansiaes.pt

Carrazeda de Ansiães (European Portuguese pronunciation: [kɐʁɐˈzedɐ ð(ɨ) ɐ̃siˈɐ̃jʃ]), officially the Town of Carrazeda de Ansiães (Portuguese: Vila de Carrazeda de Ansiães), is a municipality in the district of Bragança in northern Portugal. The population in 2011 was 6,373, in an area of 279.24 km^{2}.

== History ==
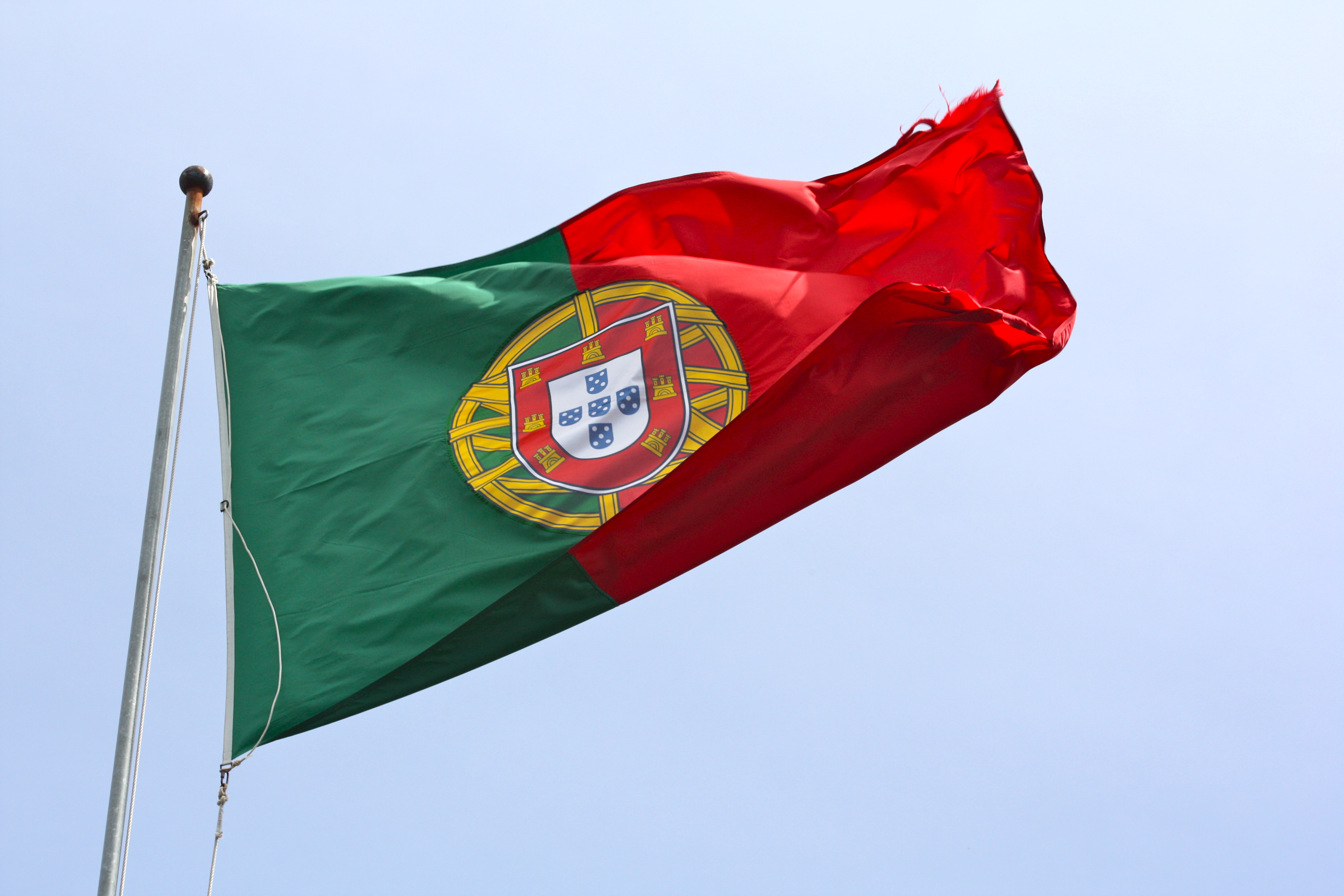
Portuguese Flag waving in Carrazeda

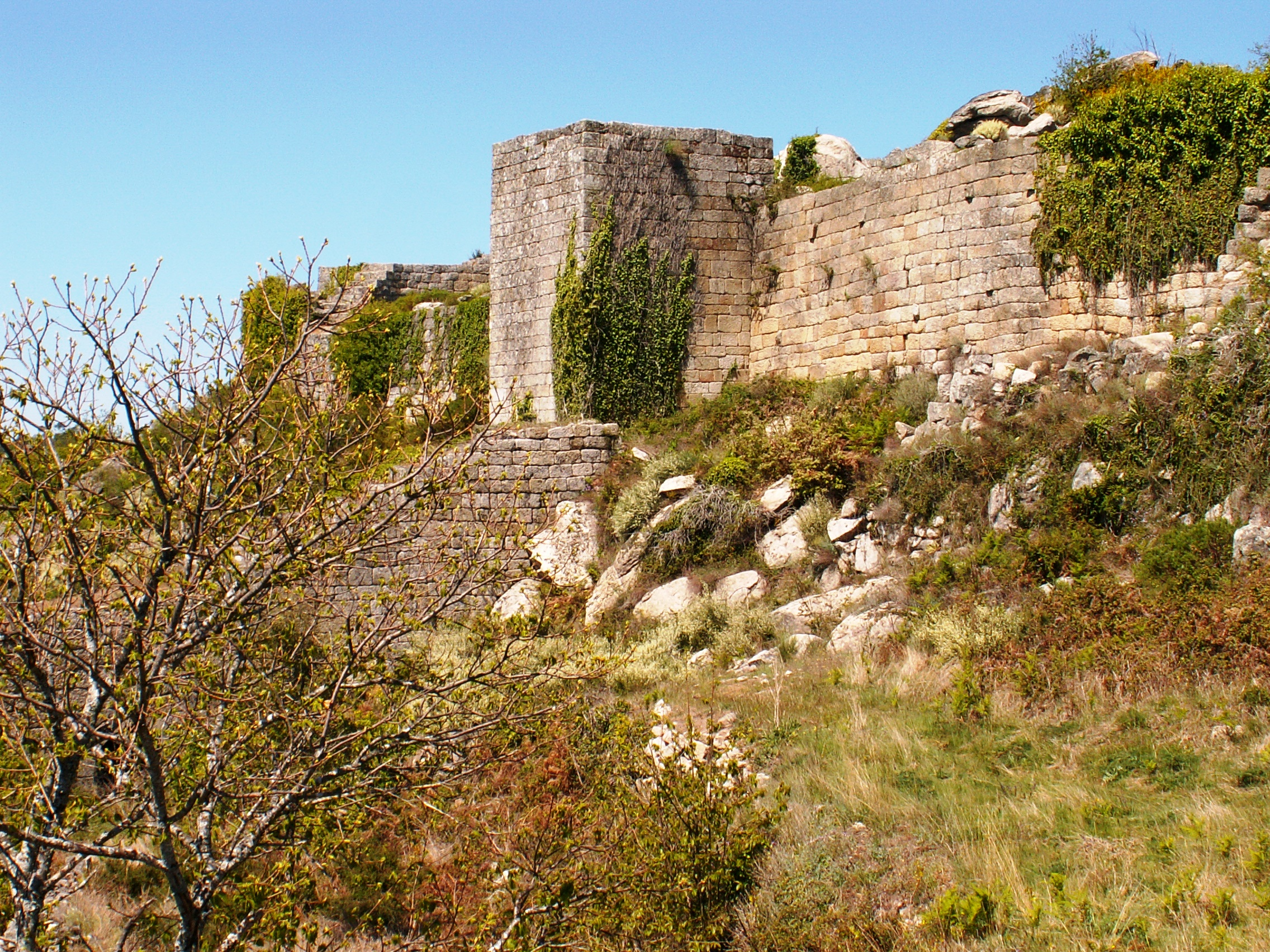
Castle of Carrazeda de Ansiães

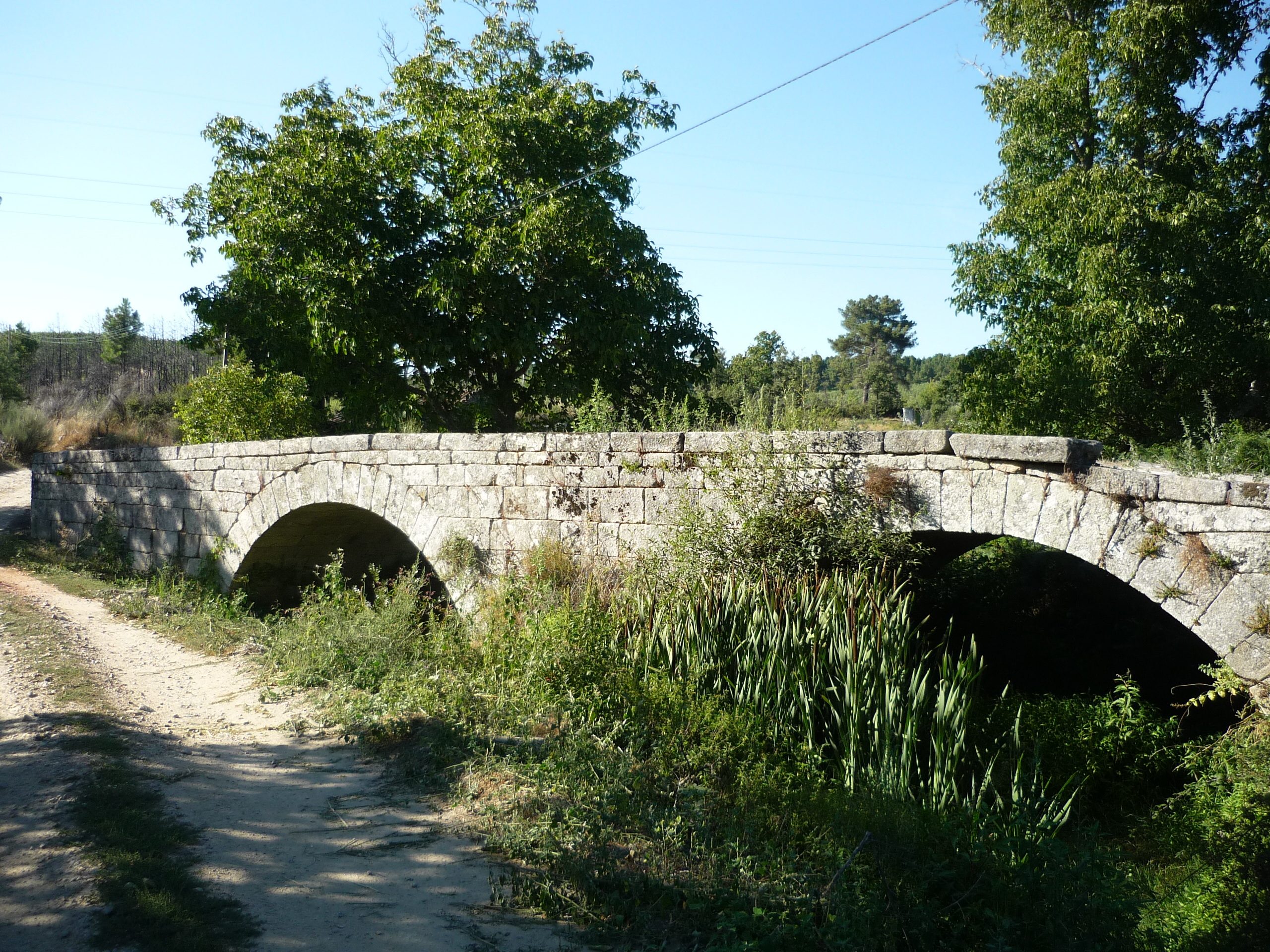
Roman aqueduct

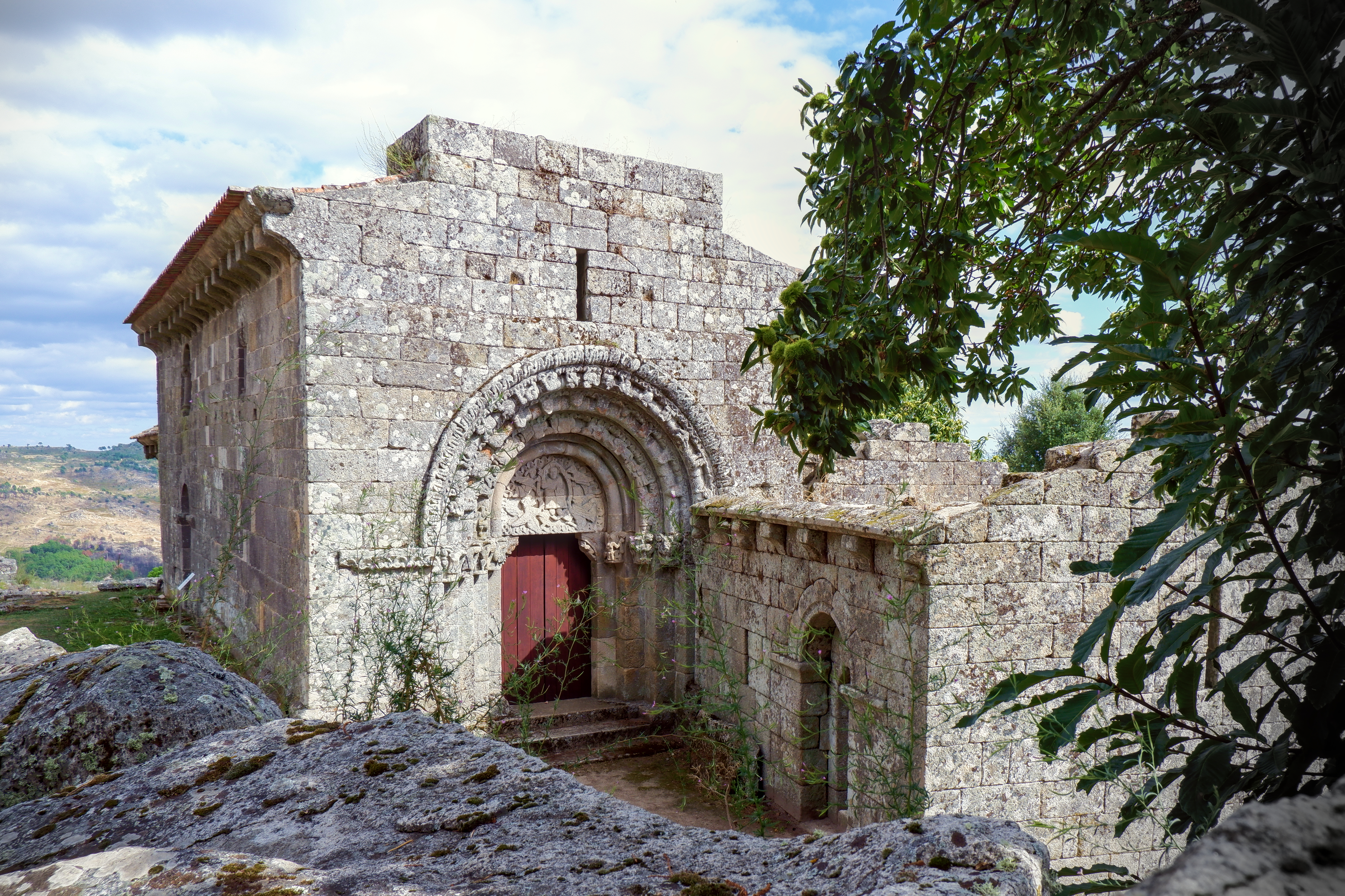
São Salvador de Ansiães Church, built in the 13th century

The territory began its historical journey, from ancient vestiges discovered, during the Neolithic period, from dolmens from Zedes and Vilarinho da Castanheira. This structures were both monumental and served to support the hunter-gathering cultures. The local dolmen were discovered with paintings, consisting of circular and spiral patterns, in addition to ceramics with undulating painted lines. Vilarinho da Castanheira also shows evidence of the areas importance as a graveyard and burial site: bodies were buried here, surrounded by large rock monuments and objects of the local religion. In Cachão da Rapa, in the shadow of the Douro river, there are similar paintings of dark red and blues, that include anthropomorphic stylized human beings. The discovery of archeological artifacts, namely lithic flakes of quartz, fragments of metamorphic schist implements, rounded pebbles and machetes, support the belief that indigenous peoples used the space. There are also lithic remnants scattered throughout the municipality with many symbols (arcs, circles or semi-circles). In the Chalcolithic and Iron Age, settlements were common in the region of Carrazed de Ansiães: places such as Castro, Lapa, Serro and Castelo Fontoura, indicate the exists of organized settlement during these periods.

The Romans also reorganized the territory; in the Roman villa in Quinta da Senhora da Ribeira (in Tralhariz), there were discovered vestiges of the construction of a sumptuous residence, completed with polychromatic tile, colonnaded interiors and carved relief. During this era Ansiães was a Roman city, designated Aquas Quintianas. The town had three altars dedicated to the local protector Tutelae Tiriensi, the other to Bandu Vordeaeco (to the cult of Lusitania in Seixo de Ansiães) and lastly to Jupiter Optimum Máximo (English: Supreme God) in Pombal. There are also visible remains of the Roman roads, including a variant of the Roman road that connect Braga and Chave, over many Roman era bridges, such as Ponte das Olgas (Pereiros) and Ponte do Torno (Amedo). The Roman era reached its end with barbarian invasions, the Suebi controlling the territory with their administrative seat in Pagus Auneco, which ultimately led to the growing influence of the walled settlement of Ansiães.

The Berber settlers vacillated considerably with Moorish influence after 711. Taking advantage of the ancient territories, Pagus gave way to Valiato de Alfândica. There are several local toponymic names from this period, including Reimoira, Mourinha, Pala da Moura and Mourãozinho. It was the arrival of the Moors that drove many Christians, who did not wish to be ruled by Muslim tribes, to take refuge in Asturias, pushing there, for the Reconquista of Christian Iberia. It was at this time that the town of Ansiães began to take on a strategic role. The town was a walled outpost that defended Christian territory, and for that role Ferdinand I of León and Castile issued a foral in the 11th century (1055/1065) in order to fix the frontier. This foral, which pre-dated the Portuguese Kingdom, was the first to be issued for lands that today pertain to Portugal.

Ansiães importance maintained itself, successively, resulting in various confirmations: by Afonso Henriques, Sancho I, Afonso II and a final foral, promulgated in 1510 by Manuel I. In addition to administrative and strategic roles, Ansiães controlled aspects of the regional economy; Ansiães, due its location and access to communication channels (relics of its Roman history), which rapidly transformed it into a "dry port" that served commercial interests in the area. Because of this, on 16 April 1277, it received a Market Charter (Portuguese: Carta de Feira), signed by King Afonso III, that stipulated the towns right to have a monthly fair, at the end of every month, which lasted a day. It also guaranteed that those who attended the fair were secure (either coming or going to the event) three days before and after the fair. These privileges were granted by the monarchy in order to promote internal commerce, interpersonal relations, and enrich the kingdom's coffers. For this reason, the King suspended debts of those that attended the fairs, as well as imposing fines for those who swindled participants.

Ansiães was encircled by a double-wall: the interior wall protected the administrative and military facilities, while the outer wall secured the local populous. There were four main gates. Of these, the Gate of São Francisco (to the northeast), which served as the entranceway for horsemen and carts, while the Gate of São Salvador linked the areas within the walls.

During this epoch, the principal settlements were Ansiães, Vilarinho da Castanheira and Linhares, that included the ecclesiastical parishes of São Salvador, São João, Santa Maria and São Miguel. On 23 May 1320, a Bull by Pope John XXII, conceded to King Denis of Portugal a three-year war subsidy, from a tithe of ecclesiastical rents within his Kingdom, knowing that the parishes were taxed in large increments.

Ansiães was also highlighted during the Portuguese Interregnum, after the death of King Ferdinand, when its population positioned themselves on the side of John I, the Master of Aviz, while Vilarinho da Castanheira supported the other pretender Beatrice. Local support was resolved with the Battle of Valdrange (1384), when Vasco Pires Sampaio's forces triumph over the pretenders subjects, and squarely aligned the region with John. When the new monarch assumed the throne, John travelled to the places where supporters had sworn allegiance to his Order, arriving on 23 October 1396 in Linhares, where he signed a regal proclamation.

Diogo de Sampaio, donatorio of Ansiães, later accompanied with 14 squires and many infantrymen, supported King Afonso V in the Battle of Toro (1476), when he reclaimed the throne of Castile, and which resulted in Sampaio being honoured with the title of Alcaide-mor of Ansiães. This loyalty, which resulted in the motto Anciães leal ao Reyno de Portugal (Ansiães Loyal to the Kingdom of Portugal), also resulted in local unflinching support of Sebastian on his conquest of North Africa; many local residents joined the King at the Battle of Alcácer Quibir (1578). This episode was the origin of Ansiães' slow demographic decline, in addition to the eventual loss of autonomy: the people of Ansiães also supported António, Prior of Crato against Philip II of Spain' Iberian Union, which disadvantaged it economically and socially.

During the War of Spanish Succession (1704–15), Portugal joined the English, Dutch and Austrian Empires against Philip V, which included many men from the farms and villages of Ansiães. This was one of the last autonomic interventions of its residents, since in 1734 its administrative sovereignty was suppressed by its amalgamation with Carrazeda, its toponymy the only vestige of the municipal history.

The Liberal Revolution of 1820, resulted in appeals from liberalist forces of Peter IV in Porto, arriving to swear allegiance to the 1822 Constitution years later.

On 7 October 1910, during a meeting in the municipal hall: "[The President] congratulates the Government, the troops and the people of Lisbon for the victory achieved in the Implantation of Portuguese Republic and sends votes that she has a future in peace and order."

With the First World War, the municipality lost many lives during Portuguese participation, which included the loss of life in Infantry Regiment 30, stationed in Mozambique.

The military coup on 28 May 1926, which ushered in the Estado Novo dictatorship was the impetus for the creation of the Comissão da Aliança Republicana Socialista (Commission for Republican Socialist Alliance) in which was established in Carrazeda de Ansiães.

In 1974, once again, the municipal authorities joined (9 May), to declare: "...unanimously, make it expressed in meeting notes, today, its support for the Movimento das Forças Armadas and manifest their entire confidence in the acts of the Junta de Salvação Nacional, with entire concordance in the program presented."

== Geography ==
=== Physical geography ===
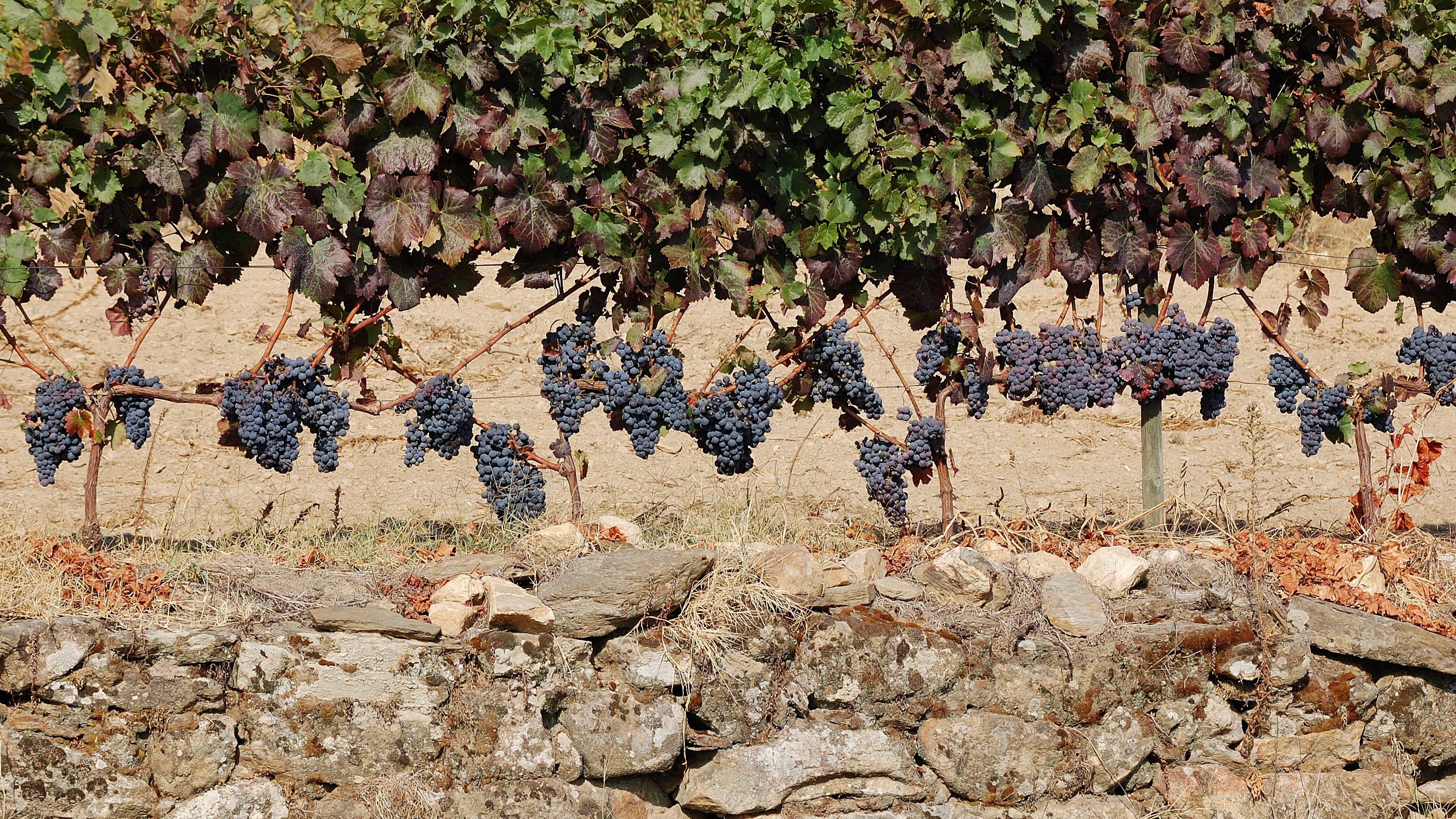
Grapes ripening on the vine, emblematic of the wine region of the Douro

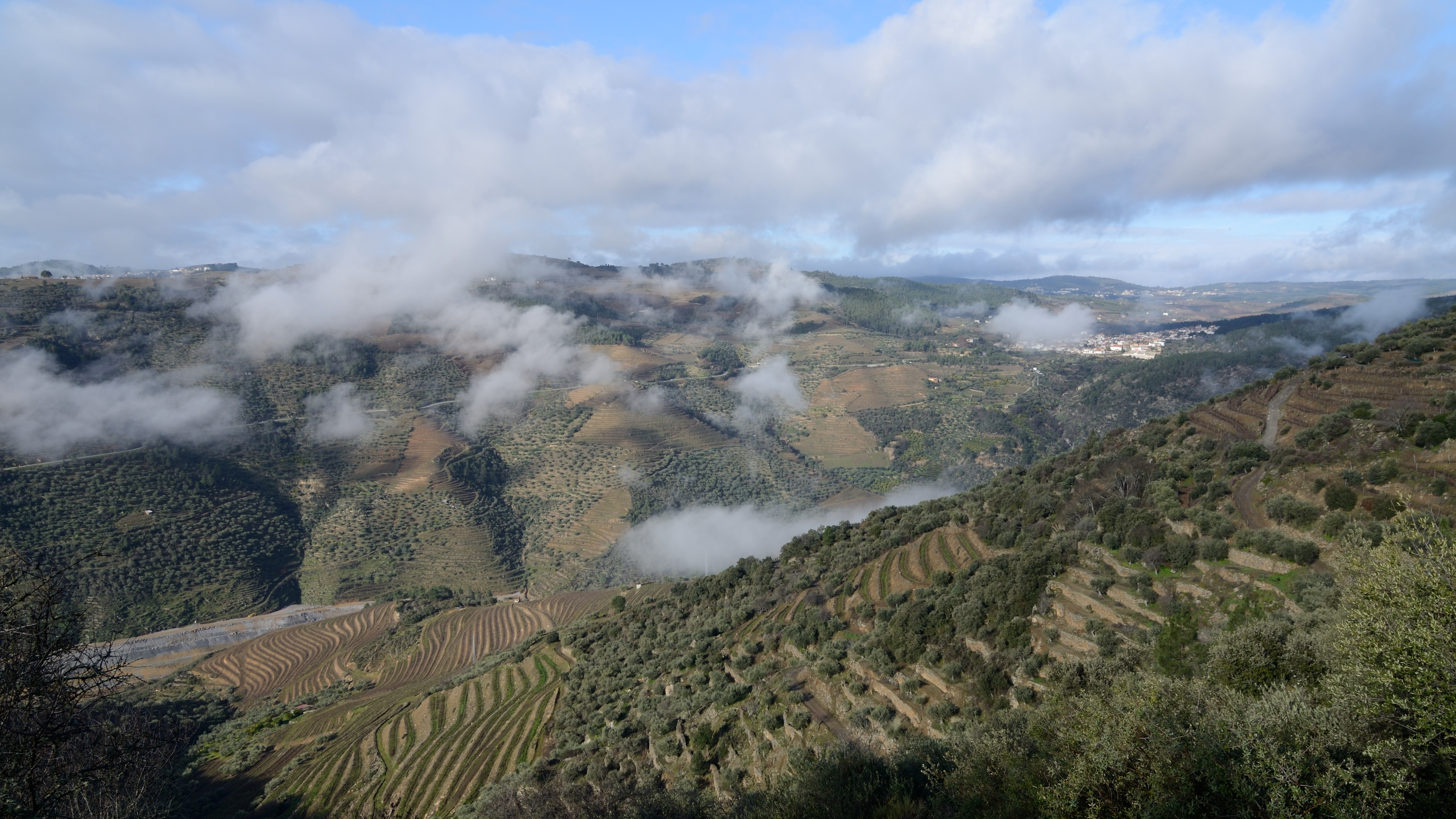
Fog in the Douro River Valley

The municipality of Carrazeda de Ansiães is situated on the right margin of the Douro River, and left margin of its tributary, the Tua River. On the Douro it is fronted by the municipality of Torre de Moncorvo (at Cadima), dividing the parish of Vilarinho da Castanheira from the neighbouring parish of Lousa (in Torre de Moncorvo). The confluence of the Tua and Douro Rivers angle to the south in the settlement of Foz Tua, its rich waters separating Carrazeda de Ansiães from the municipalities of Alijó, Murça and Mirandela, in addition to São João da Pesqueira. Territorially, its limites are defined in the north, by Murça and Mirandela; to the northeast, by Vila Flor; south by the River Douro; east by Torre de Moncorvo; and west by the Tua River. Carrazeda de Ansiães pertains to the old district of Bragança (its municipal seat located to the extreme south), and is buttressed by the districts of Vila Real in the west and Viseu in the south, across the Douro, but within the region of the Trás-os-Montes e Alto Douro.

Carrazeda de Ansiães has a lot of its territory integrated within the Alto Douro, characterized by boxed-in valleys along the Douro and Tua Rivers, with steep inclines known for its wine-producing vineyards characteristic of Porto. The lands are covered in olive, almonds and fig orchards, in addition to peaches, wheat, pears, lands for the raising of dairy- and beef-cattle, sheep and honey production.

Schists predominate this area. Meanwhile, the area of the main village (Carrazeda de Ansiães) lies on the Planalto de Carrazeda (Carrazeda Plateau), which extends until the municipalities of Vila Flor and Moncorvo (an extension of the Iberian Meseta), and is surrounded by mountains (which extend to 900 metres), such as the Serra da Reborosa, Serra da Fonte Longa, Serra da Senhora da Assunção (Vilarinho da Castanheira) and the Serra da Senhora da Graça.

The plateau zone of Carrazeda is the primary location of cereal production, the cultivation of potato, beans, corn, apple and chestnuts (which predominate), in addition to open-spaces interspersed by natural forests of pine, oak, cork oak and chestnut trees.

=== Climate ===
Carrazeda de Ansiães has a warm-summer Mediterranean climate (Köppen: Csb) characterized by cool winters and warm to hot summers with cool nights due to its altitude. As with other municipalities near the Douro Valley, altitude plays a role in temperature. Places closer to the valley at lower altitudes generally have higher temperatures (averaging around 16 °C (61 °F)), and hot to very hot summers (Köppen: Csa), while places higher in altitude (e.g. 800 m (2,600 ft)) tend to have lower average temperatures, generally around 11 °C (52 °F), with temperatures similar to those shown in the climate box below:

== Climate ==
Carrazeda de Ansiães has a warm summer mediterranean climate (Köppen climate classification: Csb) with cool, wet winters and warm, dry summers. The nights are cool throughout the year, with an average of 54 days of frost per year. The daily temperature range is greater during the summer than in the winter.

Climate data for Carrazeda de Ansiães (1991–2020), extremes (1971-present)
Month	Jan	Feb	Mar	Apr	May	Jun	Jul	Aug	Sep	Oct	Nov	Dec	Year
Record high °C (°F)	17.0 (62.6)	21.0 (69.8)	24.1 (75.4)	29.6 (85.3)	32.6 (90.7)	38.4 (101.1)	40.9 (105.6)	40.7 (105.3)	38.7 (101.7)	31.8 (89.2)	21.5 (70.7)	18.4 (65.1)	40.9 (105.6)
Mean daily maximum °C (°F)	8.7 (47.7)	11.0 (51.8)	14.5 (58.1)	16.5 (61.7)	20.5 (68.9)	25.2 (77.4)	28.7 (83.7)	28.7 (83.7)	24.5 (76.1)	18.4 (65.1)	12.2 (54.0)	9.4 (48.9)	18.2 (64.8)
Daily mean °C (°F)	4.6 (40.3)	5.9 (42.6)	8.6 (47.5)	10.5 (50.9)	13.8 (56.8)	17.6 (63.7)	20.2 (68.4)	20.3 (68.5)	17.1 (62.8)	12.8 (55.0)	7.8 (46.0)	5.4 (41.7)	12.0 (53.6)
Mean daily minimum °C (°F)	0.5 (32.9)	0.8 (33.4)	2.8 (37.0)	4.5 (40.1)	7.0 (44.6)	9.9 (49.8)	11.7 (53.1)	11.9 (53.4)	9.8 (49.6)	7.2 (45.0)	3.5 (38.3)	1.3 (34.3)	5.9 (42.6)
Record low °C (°F)	−9.5 (14.9)	−11.8 (10.8)	−9.4 (15.1)	−5.2 (22.6)	−3.0 (26.6)	−0.2 (31.6)	2.7 (36.9)	2.3 (36.1)	0.0 (32.0)	−2.7 (27.1)	−10.0 (14.0)	−9.1 (15.6)	−11.8 (10.8)
Average precipitation mm (inches)	92.7 (3.65)	57.5 (2.26)	65.2 (2.57)	71.1 (2.80)	60.3 (2.37)	27.1 (1.07)	11.5 (0.45)	18.1 (0.71)	38.3 (1.51)	102.0 (4.02)	95.2 (3.75)	104.8 (4.13)	743.7 (29.28)
Average precipitation days (≥ 1 mm)	10.0	7.8	8.2	9.8	8.0	4.1	2.1	2.2	4.6	9.4	9.9	9.1	85.2
Source: Instituto Português do Mar e da Atmosfera

Climate data for Carrazeda de Ansiães, elevation: 715 m or 2,346 ft, 1971-2000 normals and extremes
Month	Jan	Feb	Mar	Apr	May	Jun	Jul	Aug	Sep	Oct	Nov	Dec	Year
Record high °C (°F)	17.0 (62.6)	18.3 (64.9)	23.5 (74.3)	27.8 (82.0)	29.2 (84.6)	34.0 (93.2)	36.4 (97.5)	37.8 (100.0)	37.0 (98.6)	27.5 (81.5)	21.5 (70.7)	18.4 (65.1)	37.8 (100.0)
Mean daily maximum °C (°F)	8.4 (47.1)	10.7 (51.3)	14.4 (57.9)	15.3 (59.5)	18.6 (65.5)	23.5 (74.3)	27.8 (82.0)	27.7 (81.9)	24.0 (75.2)	17.8 (64.0)	12.5 (54.5)	9.5 (49.1)	17.5 (63.5)
Daily mean °C (°F)	4.3 (39.7)	5.9 (42.6)	8.5 (47.3)	9.6 (49.3)	12.4 (54.3)	16.5 (61.7)	19.8 (67.6)	19.7 (67.5)	16.9 (62.4)	12.3 (54.1)	8.1 (46.6)	5.6 (42.1)	11.6 (52.9)
Mean daily minimum °C (°F)	0.1 (32.2)	0.9 (33.6)	2.5 (36.5)	3.9 (39.0)	6.3 (43.3)	9.4 (48.9)	11.8 (53.2)	11.6 (52.9)	9.8 (49.6)	6.8 (44.2)	3.7 (38.7)	1.7 (35.1)	5.7 (42.3)
Record low °C (°F)	−9.5 (14.9)	−11.8 (10.8)	−7.0 (19.4)	−5.2 (22.6)	−3.0 (26.6)	−0.2 (31.6)	2.7 (36.9)	2.3 (36.1)	0.2 (32.4)	−2.7 (27.1)	−6.0 (21.2)	−8.0 (17.6)	−11.8 (10.8)
Average rainfall mm (inches)	83.1 (3.27)	63.0 (2.48)	35.0 (1.38)	76.5 (3.01)	72.6 (2.86)	36.4 (1.43)	14.9 (0.59)	17.6 (0.69)	43.4 (1.71)	81.1 (3.19)	89.1 (3.51)	109.7 (4.32)	722.4 (28.44)
Average rainy days (≥ 0.1 mm)	12.3	10.1	8.1	12.2	11.5	6.5	3.4	3.3	6.9	11.5	13.0	13.0	111.8
Source: Instituto de Meteorologia

=== Human geography ===
Administratively, the municipality is divided into 14 civil parishes (freguesias):

- Amedo e Zedes
- Belver e Mogo de Malta
- Carrazeda de Ansiães
- Castanheiro do Norte e Ribalonga
- Fonte Longa
- Lavandeira, Beira Grande e Selores
- Linhares
- Marzagão
- Parambos
- Pereiros
- Pinhal do Norte
- Pombal
- Seixo de Ansiães
- Vilarinho da Castanheira

== Transport ==
The locality is served by Tua Station on the Douro Valley railway line. Tua station was also the junction for the Tua line, a narrow gauge railway to Mirandela and (until 1991) further north to Bragança. The Tua line closed in 2008.

== Architecture ==
Many of the municipalities architecture date to the late 19th century, in addition to the medieval structures that highlight the regions history. The Church of São Salvador, dating to the 13th century, the church in the Romanesque-style, identifiable by its ornate entrance portico with sculpted images of the four evangelical saints in granite, is the most prominent example. Many of the villages are dotted by pillories marking the administrative authority of Kingdom, including the pelourinho de Ansiães (the oldest) dating to the 15th century, while the 18th century pillory of Carrazeda de Ansiães was erected after Ansiães was substituted as the municipal seat. The following are classified as National Monuments (Portuguese: Monumentos Nacionais) in the municipality of Carrazeda de Ansiães:

=== Prehistoric ===
- Dolmens of Vilarinho (Portuguese: Antas de Vilarinho/Pala da Mouro)
- Prehistoric-Rock Art of Cachão da Rapa (Portuguese: Fraga Pintada do Cachão da Rapa)

=== Civic ===
- Pillory of Ansiães (Portuguese: Pelourinho de Ansiães)

=== Military ===
- Castle of Carrazeda de Ansiães (Portuguese: Castelo de Ansiães)

=== Religious ===
- Church of São Salvador (Portuguese: Igreja Matriz de Ansiães/Igreja de São Salvador/Igreja de Ansiães)

== Notable people ==
- Altino Pinto de Magalhães (1922–2019) a Portuguese commissioned army officer and politician.
- Edite Estrela (born Belver, 1949) a Portuguese politician, MEP 2004 to 2014 and Mayor of Sintra from 1994 to 2002.
