= Alijó =

- Municipality
- Town of Alijó
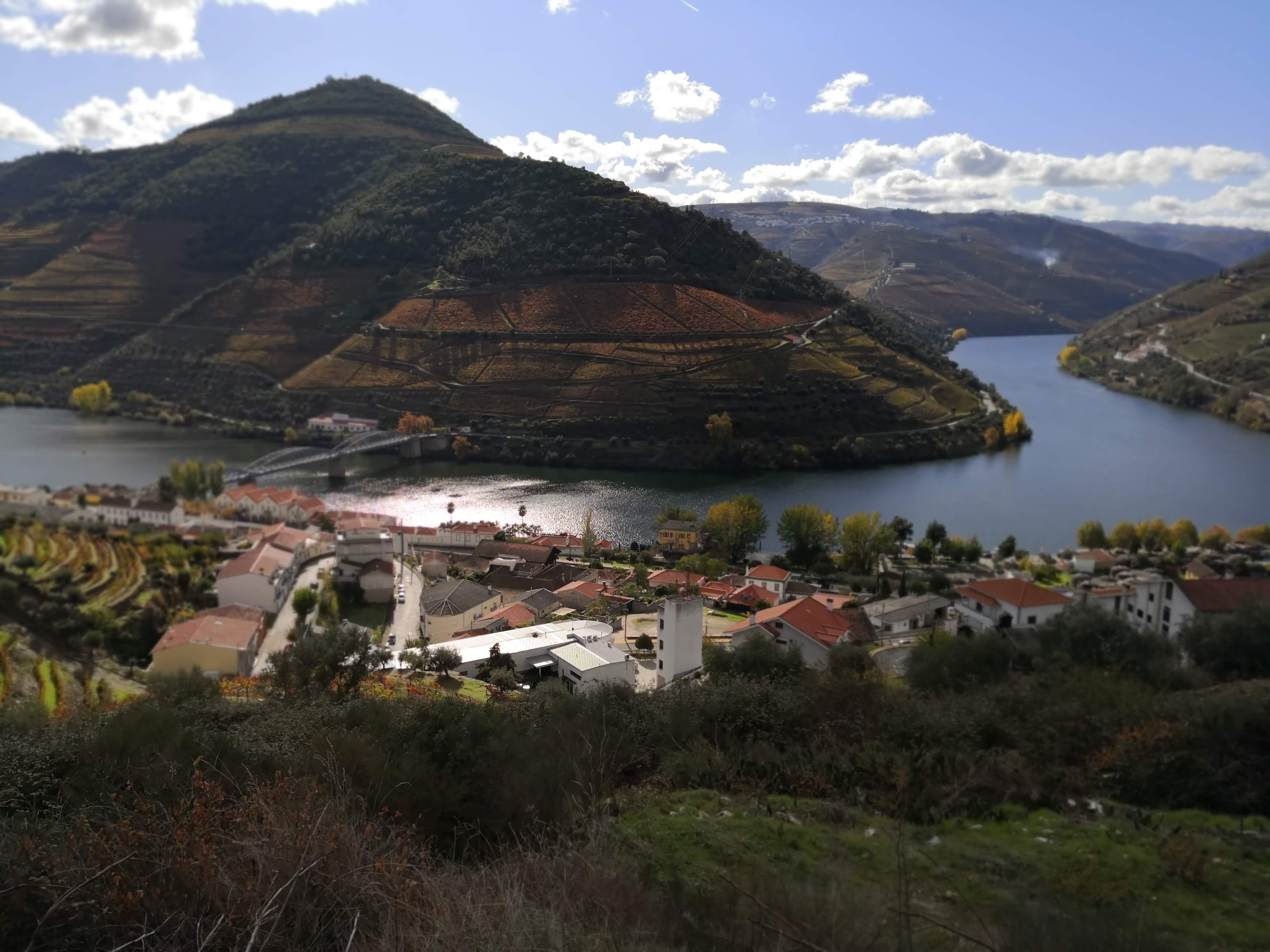
- Part of the landscape of Pinhão, which motivated the classification parts of Alijó as UNESCO World Heritage Site

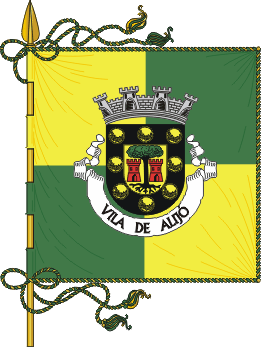
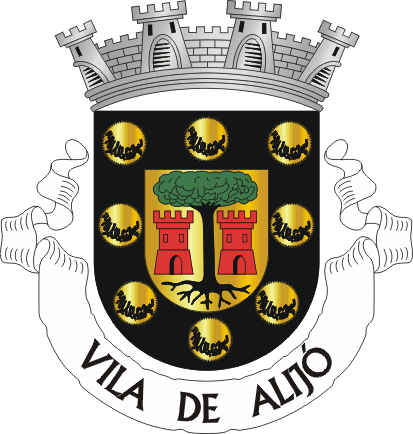
- Flag Coat of arms
- Interactive map of Alijó
- Location in Portugal
- Coordinates: 41°16′34″N 7°28′30″W
- Country: Portugal
- Region: Norte
- Intermunic. comm.: Douro
- District: Vila Real
- Parishes: 14

Government
  - President: José Rodrigues Paredes (PSD)

Area
  - Total: 297.60 km^{2} (114.90 sq mi)
- Elevation: 739 m (2,425 ft)

Population (2021)
  - Total: 10,486
  - Density: 35.235/km^{2} (91.259/sq mi)
- Time zone: UTC+00:00 (WET)
  - Summer (DST): UTC+01:00 (WEST)
- Postal code: 5070
- Area code: 259
- Patron: Santa Maria Maior
- Website: http://www.cm-alijo.pt

Alijó (Portuguese pronunciation: [ɐliˈʒɔ]), officially the Town of Alijó (Portuguese: Vila de Alijó), is a municipality in the Norte Region of Portugal, located in the district of Vila Real. The population in 2021 was 10,486, in an area of 297.60 km^{2}.

== History ==
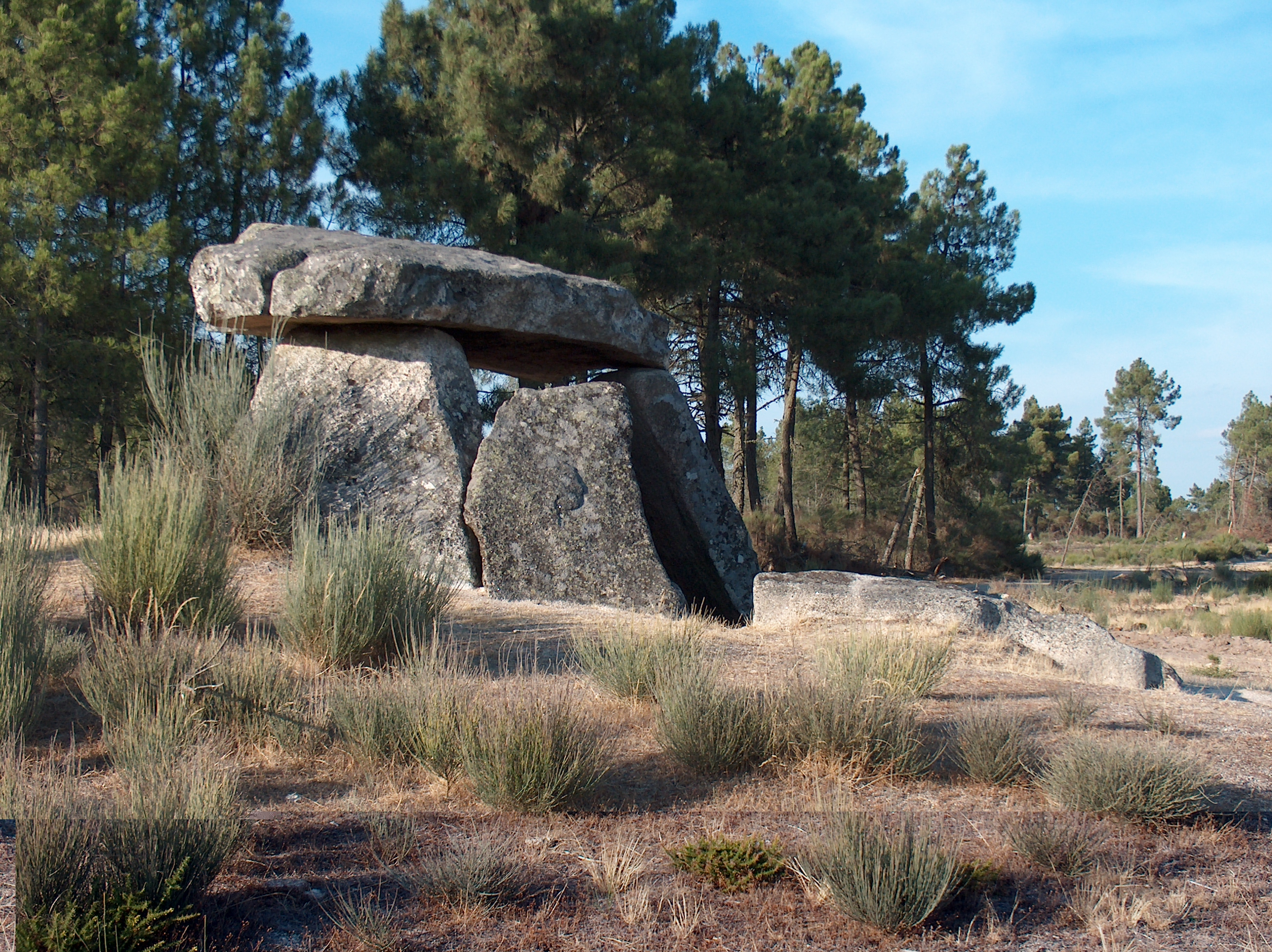
The Anta da Fonte Coberta, a funerary dolmen in the parish of Vila Chã

There are several megalithic structures, dolmens and castros in Alijó evidencing the pre-historic occupation of the region by semi-nomadic tribes, dating back to the 10th century BC. Many of the archaeological sites are well documented, and most of the archaeological evidence continue to be unearthed in reasonable condition.

The remains of Roman-era settlements in the region are primarily limited to the fountains, roads and bridges that cross Alijó.

During the 6th century some of the settlements were ecclesiastical parishes during the Suebi occupation: many of the local toponymies date to this era, including Sanfins (de São Félix), Santa Eugénia, São João Baptista (de Castedo), São Domingos (at that time an organ of Favaios), Santa Águeda (de Carlão) or São Tiago (de Vila Chã).

But, its southern border along the Douro made the region susceptible to Spanish and Moorish conflict. But, with the Christian Reconquista, after the reigns of Alfonso I and Alfonso II the region of the Trás-os-Montes and Entre-Douro-e-Minho regions became uninhabited (by both Christians and Moors). The territory began to be slowly re-populated, with the new settlements founded around existing Roman castros, rustic villages and abandoned hereditary lands.

At the time of the Inquirições (Inventory/Inquiries) in 1220, there were five ecclesiastical parishes in the territory of Alijó: Alijó, Favaios, Sanfins do Douro, São Mamede de Ribatua and Vilar de Maçada.

The following year (April 1226) he issued a royal charter (foral), and renewed in successive years (by Afonso III, on 15 November 1269, and by Manuel I on 10 July 1514). The occupation of the land began after the 12th-13th century, with the settlement by nobles and high nobility, including the Távora family (the Marquess of Távora would become the first donatário of Alijó). The Távoras remained the governing elite of the region for most of the subsequent periods (even during the Iberian Union), until the reign of Joseph I. During the monarch's era the entire family was executed and/or imprisoned for the attempted regicide of King Joseph, it what would later be called the Távora affair. At the time the municipality included the parishes of Alijó, Granja, Presandães, Chã, Valdemir, Santa Eugénia, Casas da Serra, Carlão, Franzilhal, Safres, Castedo and Cotas. These parishes pre-date the Portuguese kingdom, while Pinhão (a locality of Gouvães in the municipality of Sabrosa), Casal de Loivos, Vale de Mendiz and Vilarinho de Cotas (which were villages in the parish of Celeirós, also in Gouviães). Pópulo, Pegarinhos and Santa Eugénia which were parishes of the municipality of Murça were annexed to Alijó during the administrative reforms of 1853.

The creation of the modern municipality of Alijó occurred in January 1854.

The Douro railway line was opened as far east as Pinhão in 1880, with a further eastwards extension to Tua in 1883 and eventually reaching the border with Spain in 1887. The railway is still in use, but now with the eastern terminus at Pocinho.

The highest temperatures of the 2022 European heat waves were recorded in the civil parish of Pinhão, reaching 47.0 °C (116.6 °F) on 14 July 2022; a record for July in Portugal.

== Geography ==
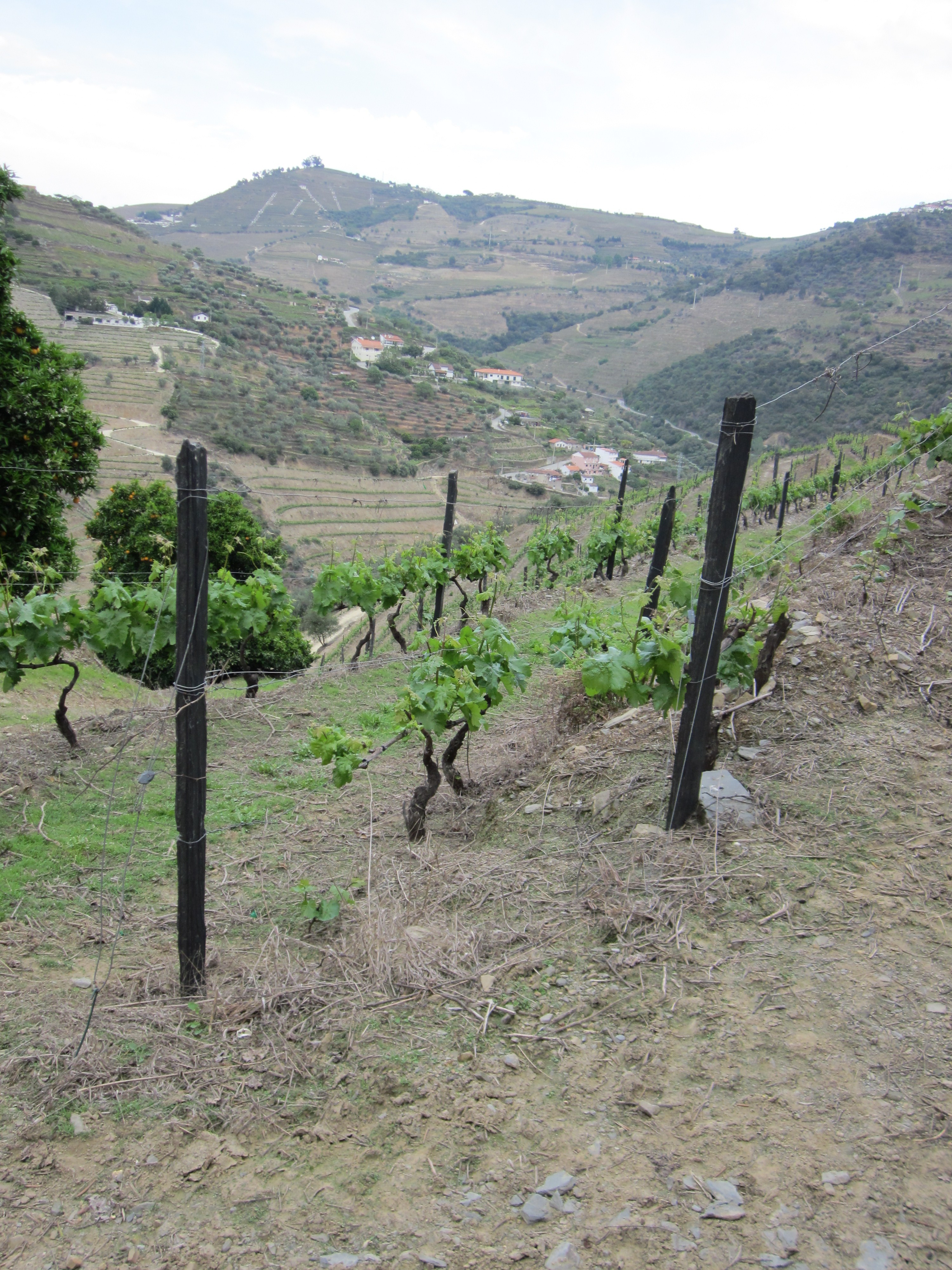
The vineyards along the terraced hilltops of Alijó

=== Physical geography ===
As much as the climate and geography has helped, the region has been endowed with many natural and archaeological traits. The municipality is delimited by the Douro, Tua, Tinhela and Pinhão rivers, and by the mountains of Trás-os-Montes. Alijó is surrounded by the municipalities of Sabrosa, Vila Real, Murça and Carrazeda de Ansiães. In the south it is limited by the Douro River, on whose southern bank is the municipality of São João da Pesqueira. The Pinhão River serves as frontier with the lands of Sabrosa. The Tua River separates Alijó from the municipality of Carrazeda de Ansiães, and the tributary of the Tua (the Tinhela River) divides the municipality from Murça. The ravines that flow into the Tua are the Alijó, São Mamede, Fragoso, Souto and Rebousa; the Douro is fed by the Roncão, Castedo and Canada; and the Pinhão River is served by the confluence of the Ribalonga, Russilhão, São Vicente and Monim. Several smaller tributaries provide the watershed with sources of water, but the local population is supported by dam located three kilometres from Presandães, which receives in its reservoir the waters from many of the small ravines.

Characteristically rural, Alijó is marked by two distinct regions: the north, terra fria (cold lands) is primarily forested or mountainous, while the south, is composed of rocky escarpments and river-valleys typical of the other municipalities in the Douro region, referred to as the terra quente (hot lands).

==== Ecoregions/Protected areas ====
On 15 December 2001, a portion of the municipality was incorporated into UNESCO's world heritage designation; it includes a fraction of the vineyards of Sanfins do Douro, Vale de Mendiz, Casal de Loivos, Cotas, Castedo and de São Mamede de Riba Tua, until Ribatua.

=== Biome ===
Rainfall in the region occurs 50 days per year, with normal intensities of 10 mm per day on average, supporting the endemic vegetation and natural aquifers. There are several tracts of land in Alijó with forests, constituted essentially of wild pine, interspersed by alders (Alnus glutinosa), oak, chestnut (Castanea sativa), ash (Fraxinus excelsior), bay laurel (Laurus nobilis), willow, cork oak (Quercus suber) and juniper. The local industry, based on cork and resin, contributes the regional economic development. The brush and small plants in the area include: lavender, camomile (Matricaria chamomilla), legumes (Genista tridentata), ferns, honeysuckle, mimosa, strawberry tree (Arbutus unedo), rosemary, blackberry, gorse, tree heath (Erica arborea), heather (Ericaceae) and common mullein (Verbascum thapsus). Other parts of the municipality include pasture-lands and mixed-use vegetation.

The area is known for a diverse forging and prey species, including rabbit, wolf, wild boar, fox and badger; migratory and endemic birds, such as bee-eaters, tit, owl, cuckoo, lark, Eurasian jay, common blackbird, lesser kestrel, red-legged partridge, European goldfinch, stock doves, hoopoe, dove (Streptopelia), warbler and nightingale; while the rivers are stocked with eel, carp and trout.

=== Climate ===
Alijó has a Mediterranean climate (Köppen: Csa) with cool wet winters and hot dry summers. Temperatures tend to increase at lower altitudes near the Douro valley, where temperatures above 40 °C (104 °F) are not uncommon during summer. During July 2022, Alijó broke 2 records at national level: a record high temperature of 47 °C (117 °F), the highest ever recorded in Portugal in July and the highest average temperature ever, which was 29.4 °C (84.9 °F) with a mean maximum temperature of 39.3 °C (102.7 °F), the second highest ever recorded in the country, after Alvega. In August 2025 Alijó recorded 13 consecutive days with maximum temperatures equal to or greater than 40 °C (104 °F).

Climate data for Pinhão, Alijó, 1971-2000 normals and extremes
Month	Jan	Feb	Mar	Apr	May	Jun	Jul	Aug	Sep	Oct	Nov	Dec	Year
Record high °C (°F)	19.0 (66.2)	23.0 (73.4)	28.6 (83.5)	32.0 (89.6)	35.5 (95.9)	40.8 (105.4)	47.0 (116.6)	45.6 (114.1)	42.0 (107.6)	35.5 (95.9)	25.5 (77.9)	25.0 (77.0)	47.0 (116.6)
Mean daily maximum °C (°F)	11.6 (52.9)	14.8 (58.6)	18.5 (65.3)	20.2 (68.4)	23.6 (74.5)	28.7 (83.7)	32.7 (90.9)	32.6 (90.7)	29.0 (84.2)	22.8 (73.0)	16.6 (61.9)	12.7 (54.9)	22.0 (71.6)
Daily mean °C (°F)	7.3 (45.1)	9.5 (49.1)	12.1 (53.8)	14.1 (57.4)	17.1 (62.8)	21.4 (70.5)	24.7 (76.5)	24.5 (76.1)	21.5 (70.7)	16.5 (61.7)	11.5 (52.7)	8.6 (47.5)	15.7 (60.3)
Mean daily minimum °C (°F)	3.1 (37.6)	4.1 (39.4)	5.8 (42.4)	8.0 (46.4)	10.7 (51.3)	14.1 (57.4)	16.7 (62.1)	16.3 (61.3)	14.0 (57.2)	10.2 (50.4)	6.5 (43.7)	4.7 (40.5)	9.5 (49.1)
Record low °C (°F)	−5.0 (23.0)	−5.2 (22.6)	−2.0 (28.4)	−0.5 (31.1)	3.0 (37.4)	5.5 (41.9)	9.0 (48.2)	9.2 (48.6)	5.8 (42.4)	0.0 (32.0)	−2.5 (27.5)	−4.0 (24.8)	−5.2 (22.6)
Average rainfall mm (inches)	78.5 (3.09)	69.8 (2.75)	36.6 (1.44)	58.8 (2.31)	53.6 (2.11)	36.3 (1.43)	15.2 (0.60)	13.1 (0.52)	38.8 (1.53)	66.4 (2.61)	74.4 (2.93)	98.8 (3.89)	640.3 (25.21)
Average rainy days (≥ 0.1 mm)	11.6	9.8	7.9	10.6	9.9	5.9	3.2	2.3	5.7	9.1	9.9	11.9	97.8
Source: Instituto de Meteorologia

=== Human geography ===
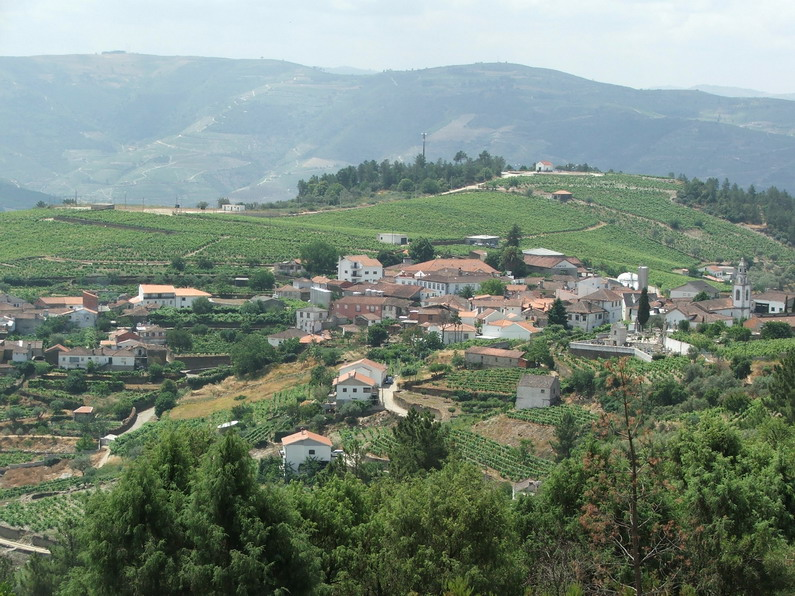
The parish of Castedo (do Douro) in rolling hills of the municipality

Population of Alijó (1801 - 2006)
Year	Pop.	±%
1801	2,423	—
1849	5,454	+125.1%
1900	19,919	+265.2%
1930	20,452	+2.7%
1960	23,511	+15.0%
1981	18,846	−19.8%
1991	16,324	−13.4%
1993	16,300	−0.1%
1995	16,000	−1.8%
1996	15,810	−1.2%
1997	15,720	−0.6%
1998	15,640	−0.5%
1999	15,550	−0.6%
2000	15,510	−0.3%
2001	15,430	−0.5%
2002	14,334	−7.1%
2003	14,021	−2.2%
2004	14,056	+0.2%
2005	14,005	−0.4%
2006	13,942	−0.4%
2011	11,942	−14.3%
2021	10,486	−12.2%

Situated in the district of Vila Real, the rural communities of the municipality include 14,334 residents, of which 13,655 are permanent. Following the exodus of 13.9% of this population in 1991, the population has seen a steady decrease in overall inhabitants, with a loss of .3% to 1.4% since the 1997 count. In 1991, there were a registered 5291 residential homes, ten years later this number grew to 8784 dwellings. Yet, the number of families slightly increased during this period passing from 5291 (in 1991) to 5784 during the 2001 census (approximately a 1.6% increase). These numbers place Alijó sixth within the district of Vila Real. From the number of motorized vehicles registered (7576) within the municipality there is some inference that a level of progress has been attained within the community as a whole.

Administratively, the municipality is divided into 14 civil parishes (freguesias):

- Alijó
- Carlão e Amieiro
- Castedo e Cotas
- Favaios
- Pegarinhos
- Pinhão
- Pópulo e Ribalonga
- São Mamede de Ribatua
- Sanfins do Douro
- Santa Eugénia
- Vale de Mendiz, Casal de Loivos e Vilarinho de Cotas
- Vila Chã
- Vila Verde
- Vilar de Maçada

== Economy ==
In 1996, the number of residents linked to the economic sectors of the population included: 46.6% in the primary sector, 18% in industry and manufacturing, while the majority, 38.4%, were associated with the tertiary sector.

Generally, the rural municipality falls within the Douro DOC, is essentially agricultural in economic activity with some small commerce. The viticulture, fine wine producers, over the centuries have practiced a technique of sculpting the landscape around the Douro River and other tributaries, acting as arterial veins to transport wine down to the urban centres in Vila Nova de Gaia and Porto. In addition, the land also supports herding in pastures, and is divided into two distinct areas: a northern zone, rich in olive oil, cereals, legumes, potato and almonds; and a southern area that focuses on wine production.

There is no clear indication of the number of day-trips, bus tours or tourist-specific adventures into the region annually, but the region has several landscapes, archaeological sites and cultural activities to attract tourists or vacationers.

== Notable people ==
- Manuel da Nóbrega (1517 in Sanfins do Douro – 1570) a Jesuit priest in colonial Brazil, influential in the early history of Brazil and participated in the founding of several cities.
- Rodrigo Pinto Pizarro (1788-1841) the President of the Council of Ministers in 1839.
- António Alves Martins (1808–1882) a bishop, professor, journalist and politician.
- José Sócrates (birth in 1957 registered here) Prime Minister of Portugal 2005-2011
- Abel Pereira (born 1990) a Portuguese footballer with about 200 club caps.

== See also ==
- Douro DOC
- Douro, Subregion
