= Murça =

Town of Murça
- Municipality
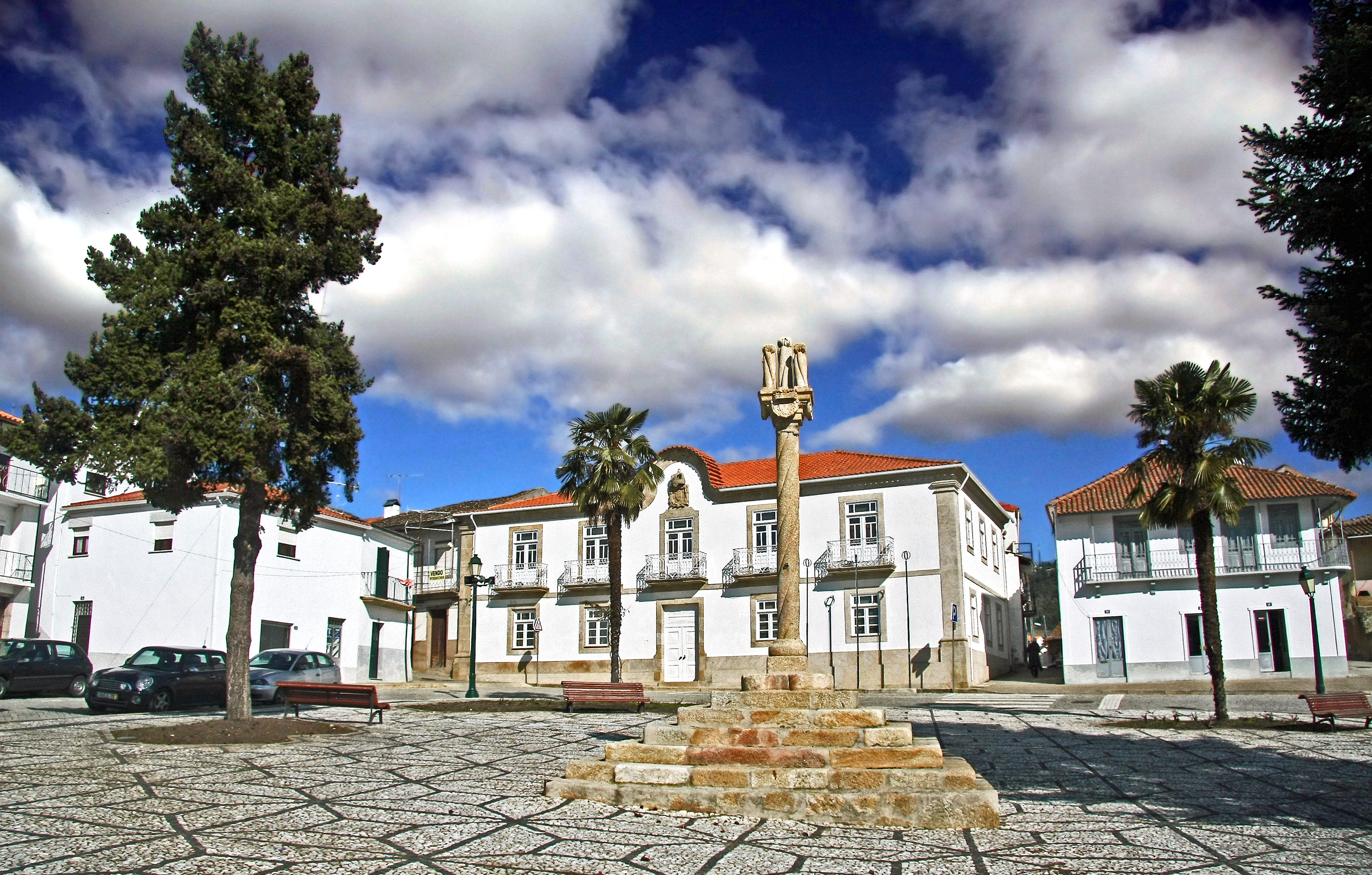

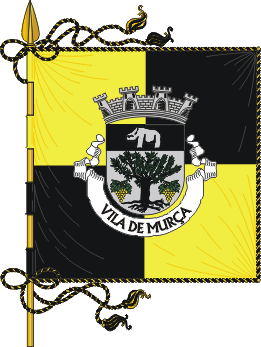
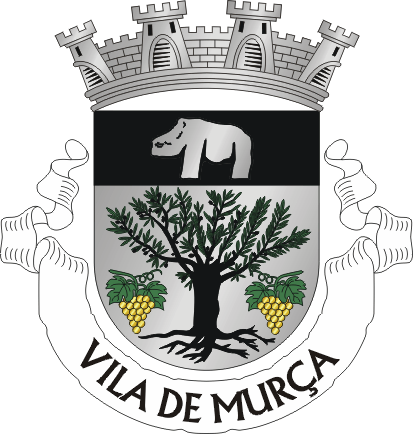
- Flag Coat of arms
- Interactive map of Murça
- Coordinates: 41°24′30″N 7°27′14″W
- Country: Portugal
- Region: Norte
- Intermunic. comm.: Douro
- District: Vila Real
- Seat: Murça Municipal Chamber
- Parishes: 7

Government
  - President: João Luís Teixeira Fernandes (PS)

Area
  - Total: 9 km^{2} (3.5 sq mi)
- Elevation: 600 m (2,000 ft)

Population (20)
  - Total: 5,952
  - Density: 660/km^{2} (1,700/sq mi)
- Time zone: UTC+00:00 (WET)
  - Summer (DST): UTC+01:00 (WEST)
- Postal code: 1234
- Website: http://www.cm-murca.pt

Murça (Portuguese pronunciation: [ˈmuɾsɐ]), officially the Town of Murça (Portuguese: Vila de Murça), is a municipality in northern Portugal. The population in 2011 was 5,952, in an area of 189.37 km^{2}. It is situated in the central part of the eastern district of Vila Real, and consigned to the Trás-os-Montes e Alto Douro region. The town of Murça, seat of the municipal government, is on average 40 kilometres from many of the major urban centres of the region.

== History ==
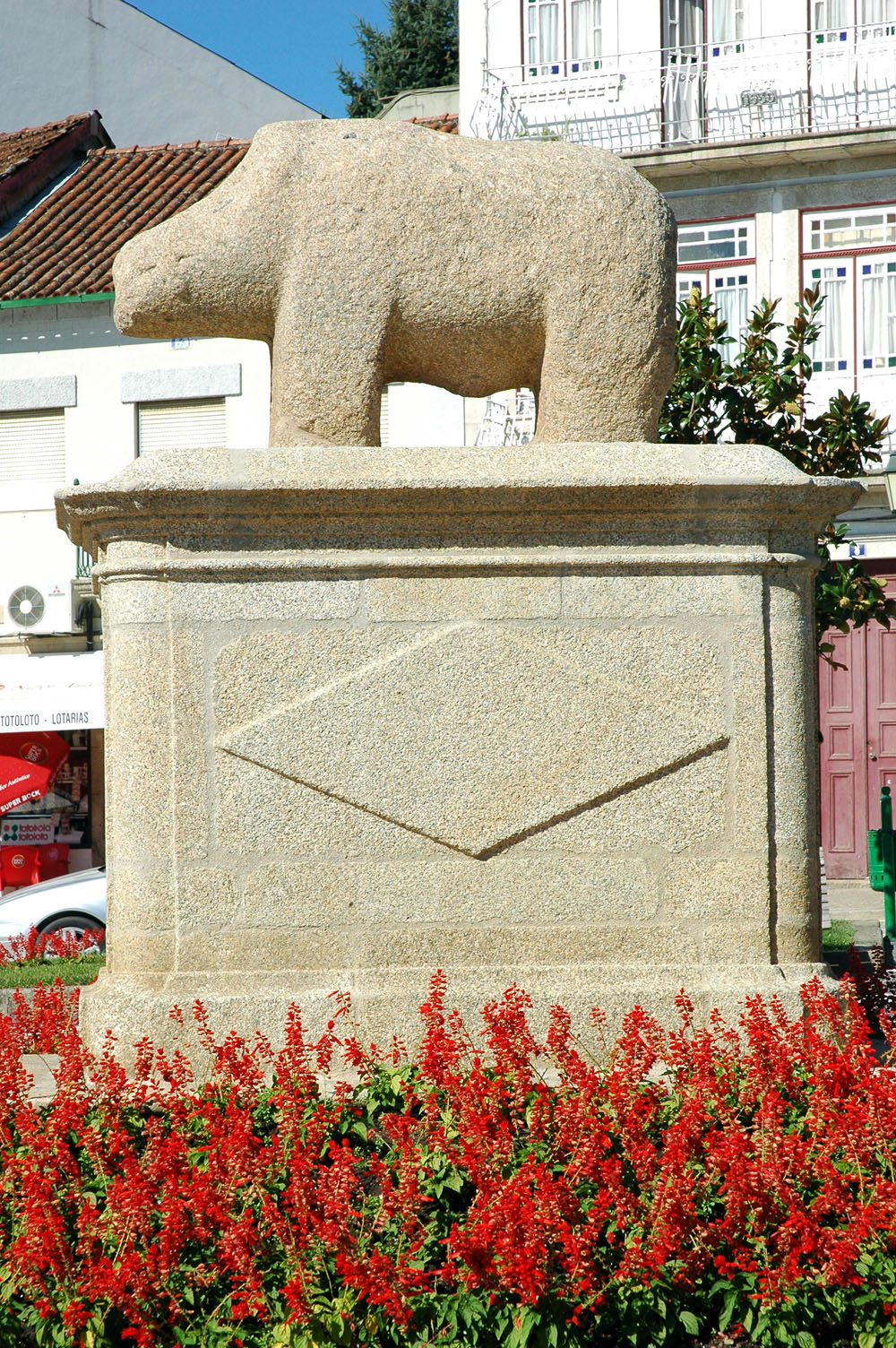
The Porca de Murça: an ancient Celtic deity found in the region of Murça

Although there are no clear references to the origin of this community, it is generally believed to date to the Celtic period, primarily due to the iconic Porca de Murça (English: Pig of Murça), a celebrated monument to a wild boar (presumably a Celtic divinity).

The first references to the region of Murça appeared in the Inquirições (inquiries/inventory) of King Afonso II. Municipal autonomy became a reality in the 13th century, when King Sancho II issued a foral (charter) on 8 May 1224. This was later confirmed and elaborated by Afonso III on 10 January 1268. Similar charters were elaborated on 18 April 1304 and 9 May 1512, by Kings Denis and Manuel, respectively.

During the Liberal Revolution (18th century) Murça five Counts were honoured by King John VI of Portugal.

In the 20th century, an administrative commission (Portuguese: Comissão Administrativa Franquista) was created on 2 January 1908, by the Partido Regenerador Liberal (English: Liberal Regenerator Party), to promote local politics, in order to realize the regions first elections. The Regenerator Party was successful in these early elections, resulting in the taking of office of Father João M. Ribalonga, who would guide the administration of the municipality from 30 November 1908 until the 5 October 1910 Revolution. The first republican municipal commission was elected on 19 March 1911.

During the Estado Novo regime (1933-1974) the first municipal regalia, including coat-of-arms, flag and seal, were established, in addition to the changing of many road names.

After the Carnation Revolution (25 April 1974), there was a great upheaval in local government, that forced a democratic structure and implemented many dynamic changes to financial and political laws.

== Geography ==
Population of Murça (1801 - 2004)
Year	Pop.	±%
1801	4,531	—
1849	4,975	+9.8%
1900	6,857	+37.8%
1930	7,886	+15.0%
1960	10,364	+31.4%
1981	8,518	−17.8%
1991	7,371	−13.5%
2001	6,752	−8.4%
2011	5,952	−11.8%

Murça can be identified in terms of three subregions in the Trás-os-Montes: the Terra Quente (English: Hot Lands), the Terra Fria (English: Cold Lands) and the Zona de Montanha (English: Mountain Zone), with their own distinct natural, social and cultural characteristics. There are distinct contrasts in the villages and towns of Trás-os-Montes, with hot summers and icy winters, in lands that are marked by granite mountain faces, schist walls and steep or shallow valleys. The green forests and granite rocks of the Serra da Garraia or Parque Florestal de Mascanho (Mascanho Forest Park) dominate the north portions of the municipality, as does the chestnut forest of Jou and Vilares. Between many of the mountains and plains are olive orchards, part of the Rota de Azeite (English: Olive Oil Route), and interspersed by wheat fields or almond trees in flower, or the vineyards of the Alto Douro.

Administratively, the municipality is divided into 7 civil parishes (freguesias):

- Candedo
- Carva e Vilares
- Fiolhoso
- Jou
- Murça
- Noura e Palheiros
- Valongo de Milhais

== Notable people ==
- Inácio do Nascimento de Morais Cardoso (1811–1883) a Cardinal of the Roman Catholic Church and Patriarch of Lisbon.
- Aníbal Milhais (1895 in Valongo de Milhais – 1970) was the most decorated Portuguese soldier of World War I; nicknamed "Soldado Milhões" for being "worth a million men".
