= Douro (intermunicipal community) =

- Intermunicipal community
- Logo
- Interactive map of Douro
- Location in Portugal
- Coordinates: 41°18′N 7°45′W
- Country: Portugal
- Region: Northern Portugal
- Seat: Vila Real
- Municipalities: 19

Area
  - Total: 4,031.58 km^{2} (1,556.60 sq mi)

Population (2011)
  - Total: 205,157
  - Density: 50.8875/km^{2} (131.798/sq mi)
- Time zone: UTC+00:00 (WET)
  - Summer (DST): UTC+01:00 (WEST)
- Website: cimdouro.pt

The Comunidade Intermunicipal do Douro (Portuguese pronunciation: [ˈdoɾu]) is an administrative division in Portugal. It replaced the Comunidade Urbana do Douro, created in 2004. It takes its name from the Douro River. The seat of the intermunicipal community is Vila Real. Douro comprises parts of the former districts of Bragança, Guarda, Vila Real and Viseu. The population in 2011 was 205,157, in an area of 4,031.58 square kilometres (1,556.60 mi^{2}).

Douro is also a NUTS3 subregion of Norte Region. Since January 2015, the NUTS 3 subregion covers the same area as the intermunicipal community.

Its economic activity is largely centered on the production of wine, particularly port, and also non-fortified Douro wine from the Douro DOC wine region. The entire region is mountainous and crossed by steep valleys.

== Municipalities ==
The CIM Douro is composed of 19 municipalities:

Municipality	Population (2011)	Area (km²)
Alijó	11,942	297.60
Armamar	6,297	117.24
Carrazeda de Ansiães	6,373	279.24
Freixo de Espada à Cinta	3,780	244.14
Lamego	26,691	165.42
Mesão Frio	4,433	26.65
Moimenta da Beira	10,212	219.97
Murça	5,952	189.37
Penedono	2,952	133.71
Peso da Régua	17,131	94.86
Sabrosa	6,361	156.92
Santa Marta de Penaguião	7,356	69.28
São João da Pesqueira	7,874	266.11
Sernancelhe	5,671	228.61
Tabuaço	6,350	133.86
Tarouca	8,046	100.08
Torre de Moncorvo	8,572	531.56
Vila Nova de Foz Côa	7,312	398.15
Vila Real	51,850	378.80
Total	205,157	4,031.58

== Geography ==
The main rivers are Douro River, Corgo River, Tua River and Sabor River. There is an airport at Vila Real: Aerodromo de Vila Real/Douro [VRL]. The Douro railway line was completed in 1887. The narrow gauge branch lines in the area (such as the Corgo line) are now all closed.

The main monuments are the cathedral and Mateus Palace in Vila Real, and the Remedios and Sé/cathedral in Lamego. The Alto Douro Wine Region and the Prehistoric Rock-Art Site of the Côa Valley are both classified by UNESCO as heritage sites.

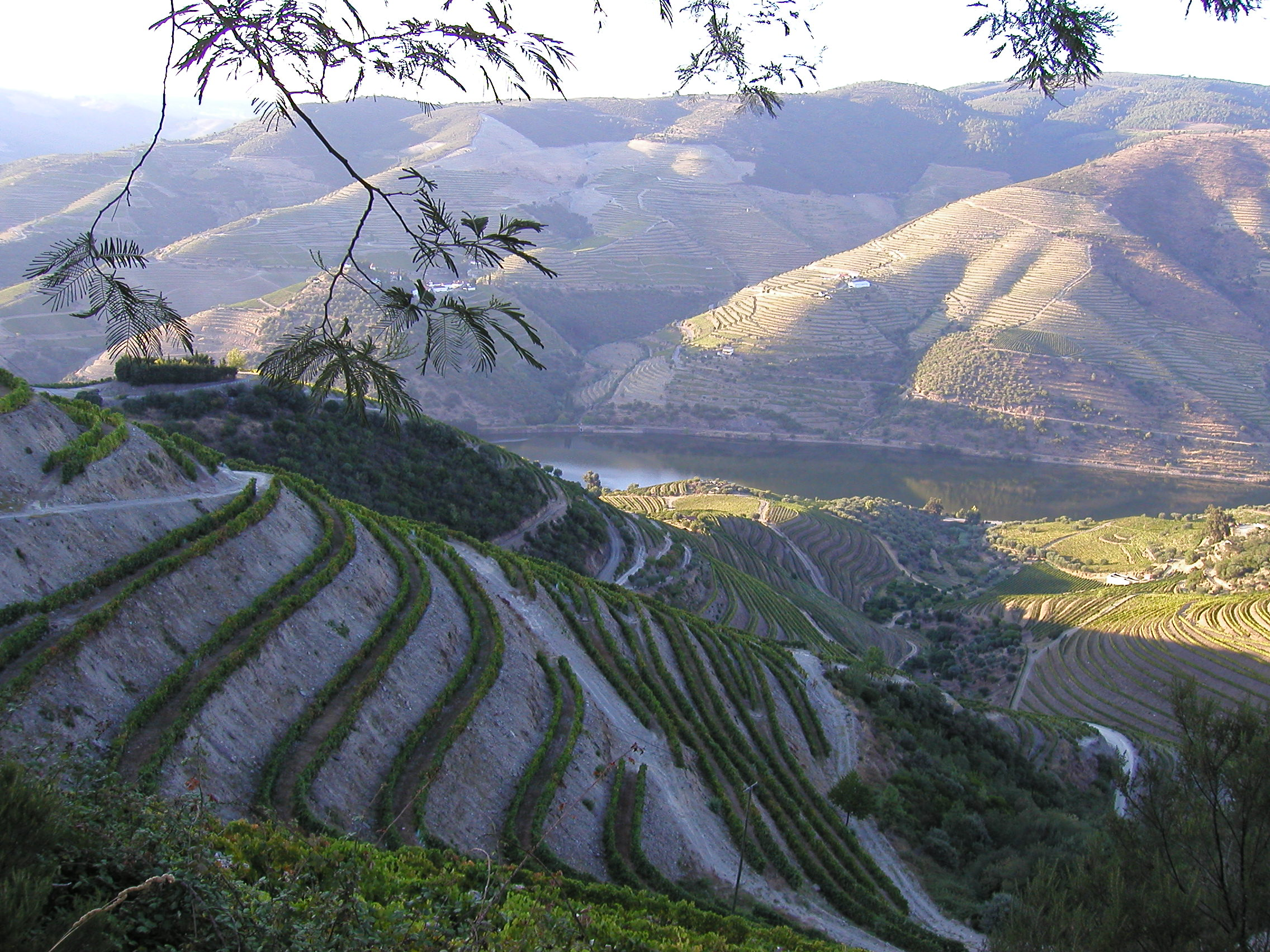
The grape vine terraces in the Douro valley

The University of Trás-os-Montes and Alto Douro is situated in Vila Real.
