= Castle of Castelo Melhor =

Castle in Guarda, Portugal

- Castelo de Castelo Melhor
- Guarda, Douro, Norte Region, Portugal in Portugal
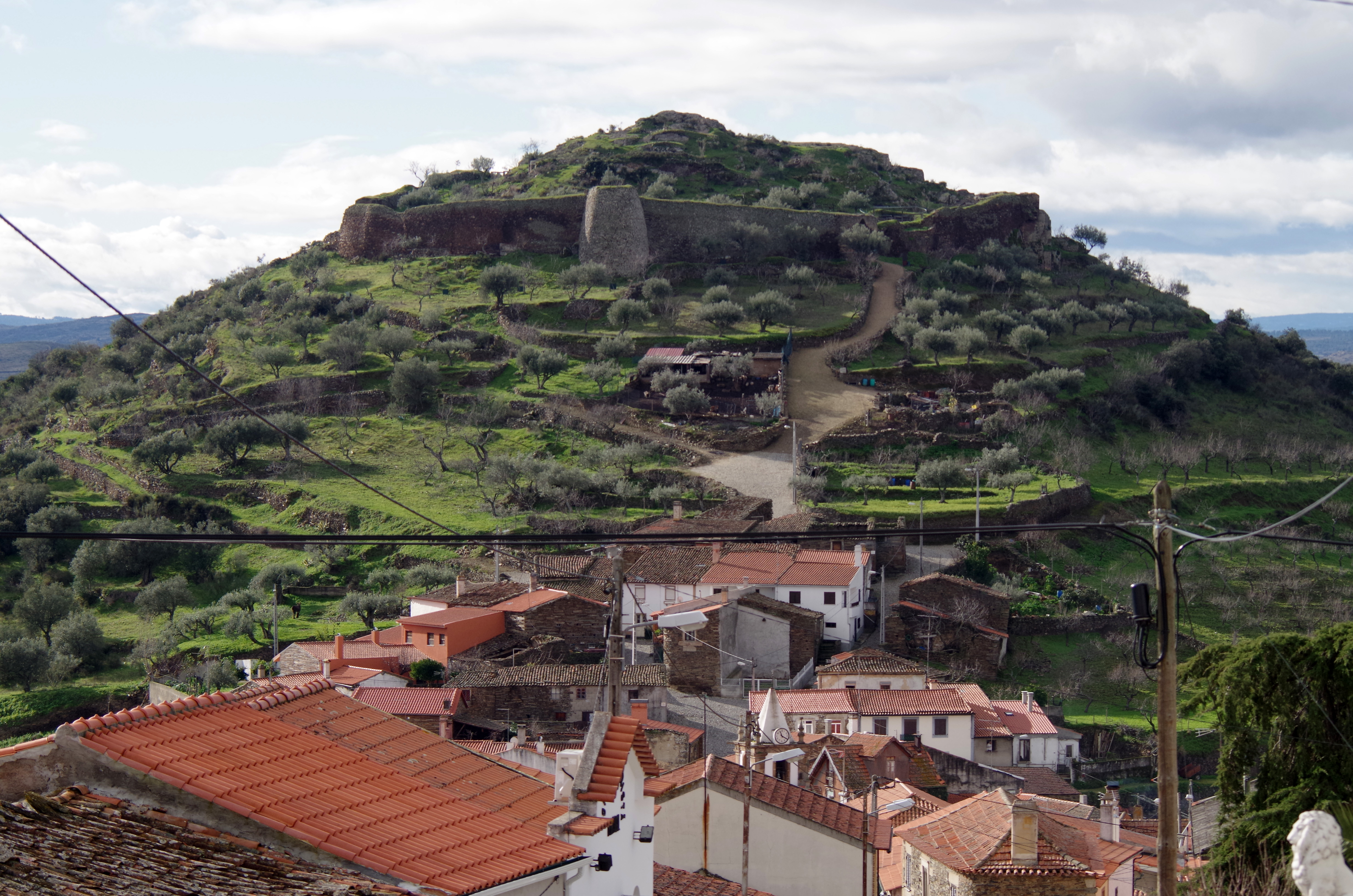
- A view of the wall fortifications circling the mountain in Castelo Melhor

Site information
- Type: Castle
- Owner: Portuguese Republic
- Operator: DRCNorte (Ordinance 829/2009, Diário da República, Série 2, 163, 24 August 2009)
- Open to the public: Public

Location
- Coordinates: 41°1′22.5″N 7°3′59.9″W

Site history
- Built: 11th century
- Materials: Granite, Schist

The Castle of Castelo Melhor (Portuguese: Castelo de Castelo Melhor) is a medieval castle located in the civil parish of Castelo Melhor, in the municipality of Vila Nova de Foz Côa, Portuguese Guarda. The castle is one of the best examples of secondary medieval fortresses, erected in one of the more peripheral zones of the peninsular kingdoms.

== History ==
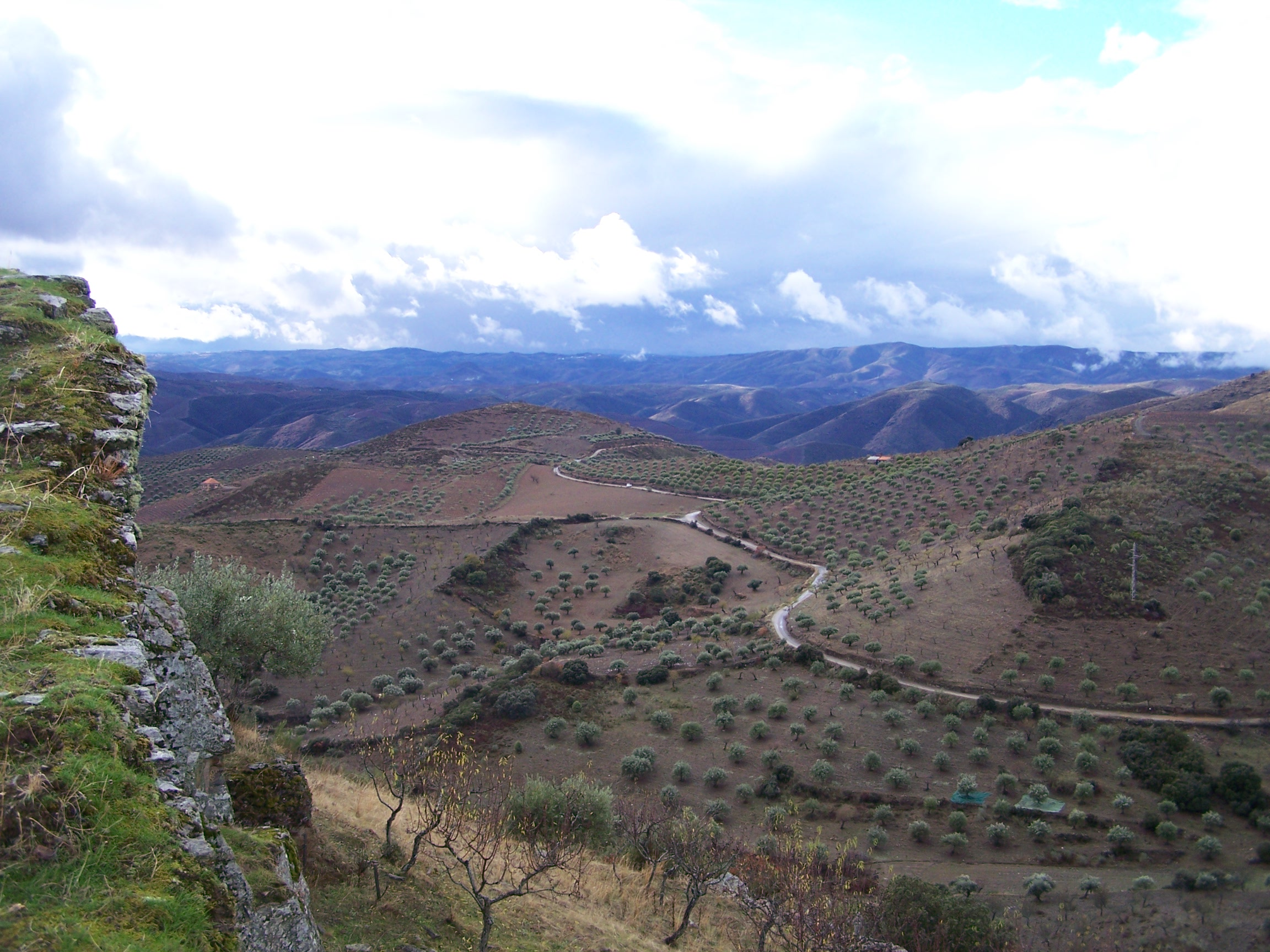
A view over the Côa River valley from the fortification walls

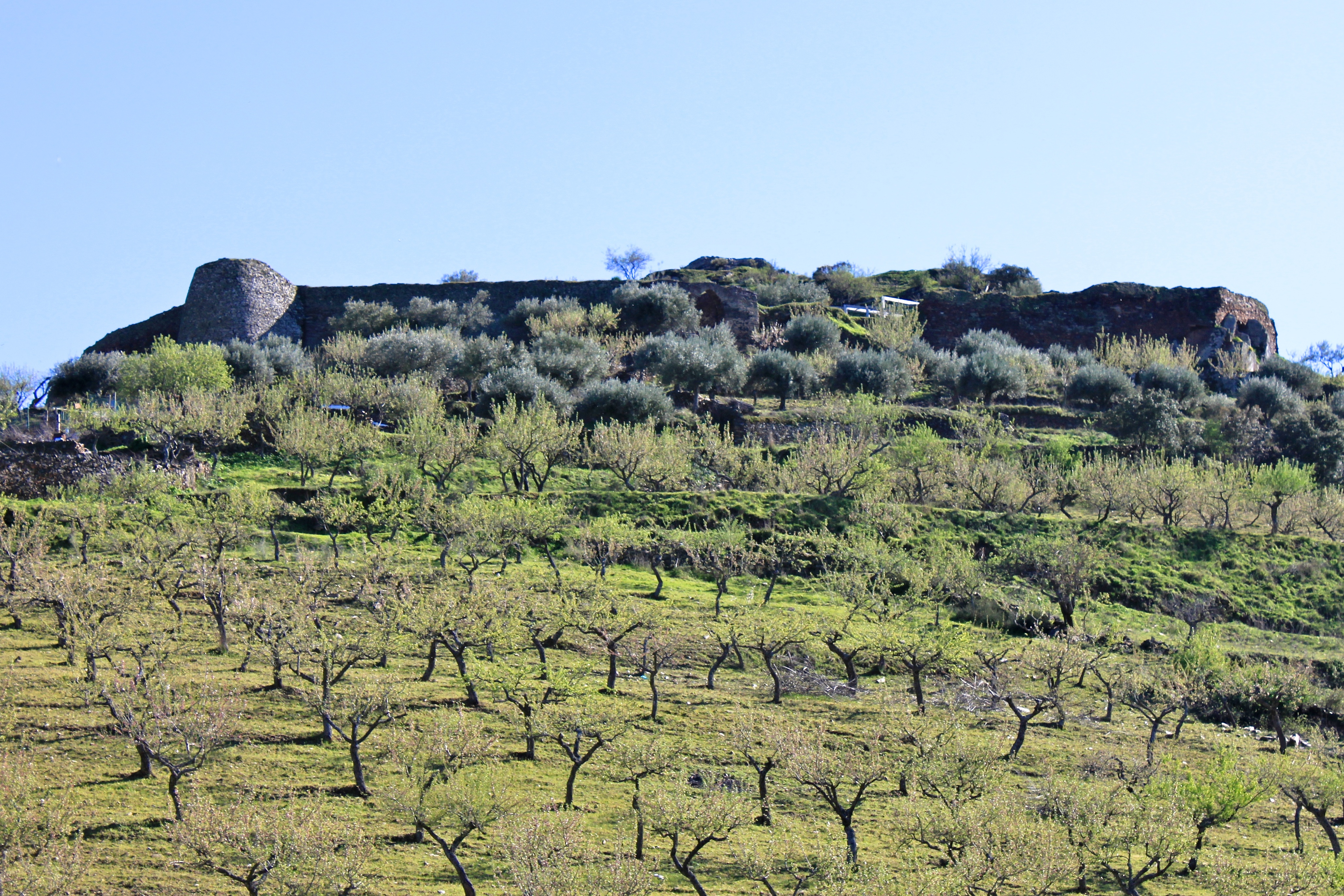
The walls circling the hilltop with olive orchards in the foreground

During the pre-Roman era, the site was occupied by a castro founded by the Turduli peoples.

By the 12th century, the land was already occupied by Leonese forces. The project was conceived by the Leonese and began in the 13th century, a period that corresponded to intense fortification of the lines of Riba-Côa, an area that was constantly in dispute between the Portuguese and Castilian monarchs. It was in this context that King D. Alfonso VII of León conceded a foral (charter) to Castelo Melhor between 1209 and 1210, simultaneously ordering the construction of the "castle", in order to consolidate the population and military, which would become important in the succeeding centuries.

As a consequence of the Treaty of Alcanices, in 1297, the land was integrated into Portuguese territory. On 12 June 1298, King D. Dinis confirmed the privileges issued during Leonese dominion, affirming the importance of the new space. At the same time, he ordered work on the castle and dotted on the town a new administrative purpose, even as it continued to project a secondary military importance within the military lines of Riba-Côa.

This minor statute was supported by King Denis. In addition to its transformation and later ruins, he limited the reformulation to the "entrance system to the castle, whose gate began to be flanked by two rectangular towers". This solution, by its scenographic and authoritarian symbolism transmitted regal authority in the region. Parallel with the perimeter wall, the generally circular and singular tower were "oriented toward the settlement, protecting the unique flank where access was possible". Denis's confirmation of Alfonso's privileges, which avoided any sudden changes to the population or administrative organization of the town, but added a keep tower.

In the last quarter of the 14th century, the first repairs were completed on the castle, during the reign of King D. Fernando. Between 1383 and 1385, during the dynastic crisis, the castle became the dominion of the Kingdom of Castile. Following the Treaty of Monção, on 29 November 1389, the Portuguese crown obtained the squares of Olivença, Noudar, Mértola, Castelo Mendo and Castelo Melhor, while ceding Salvaterra and Tui.

In the first quarter of the 15th century, repairs were undertaken during the reign of Kings D. John I and D. Afonso V. At the beginning of this century (in 1422) the Rol dos Besteiros, refers to the Castelo Melhor included some 1704 inhabitants. King Afonso V was obliged to confer on Castelo Melhor the status of town, integrating it with the municipality of Almendra, resulting in the municipality of Almendra e Castelo Melhor. During the 1496 Inquirição (royal inquiries) there were only 204 inhabitants in the territory.

At the end of the 15th century, King D. John II donated the lands of Castelo Melhor to João Fernandes Cabral for 4000 crowns for his marriage to Joana Coutinho. In the following century, many of the important noble families became affixed to the alcalde of the castles, and the fortress fell into the hands of the Cabral, whom were responsible for the alcalde of Belmonte. But, even as Belmonte became the seat of their power, resulting the construction of their seat, in Castelo Melhor, little remained. Around this time (1527), Castelo Melhor was mentioned in the Cadastro da População do Reino (Kingdoms Population Cadastre) as being a part of the town of Almendra. In 1584, it was elevated to the status of seat of the countship, in favor of Rui Mendes de Vasconcelos.

During the context of the Restoration Wars, in 1640, an artillery battery was constructed on the eastern flank of the hilltop.

In the 18th century, Castelo Melhor was already a subordinate to Almendre and its donataries were the Counts of Castelo Melhor.

On 17 April 1758, in the Memórias Paroquiais, signed by the parish priest, José Gonçalves da Guerra, the settlement was acknowledged as a donatary fiefdom of D. José de Caminha Vasconcelos e Sousa, Faro, Távora e Veiga, Count of Castelo Melhor, and included a population of 89 residents. The castle was granted the title of seat of the county, without garrison, but defensible by necessity.

In 1766, the town was elevated to the status of march in favour of the 4th Count, José de Vasconcelos e Sousa Caminha da Câmara Faro e Veiga (the last titular was the 7th Marquess, Elena Maria de Vasconcelos e Sousa Ximenes).

In 1855, the municipality of Almendra e Castelo Melhor was extinguished, in favor of the municipality of Vila Nova de Foz Côa.

== Architecture ==
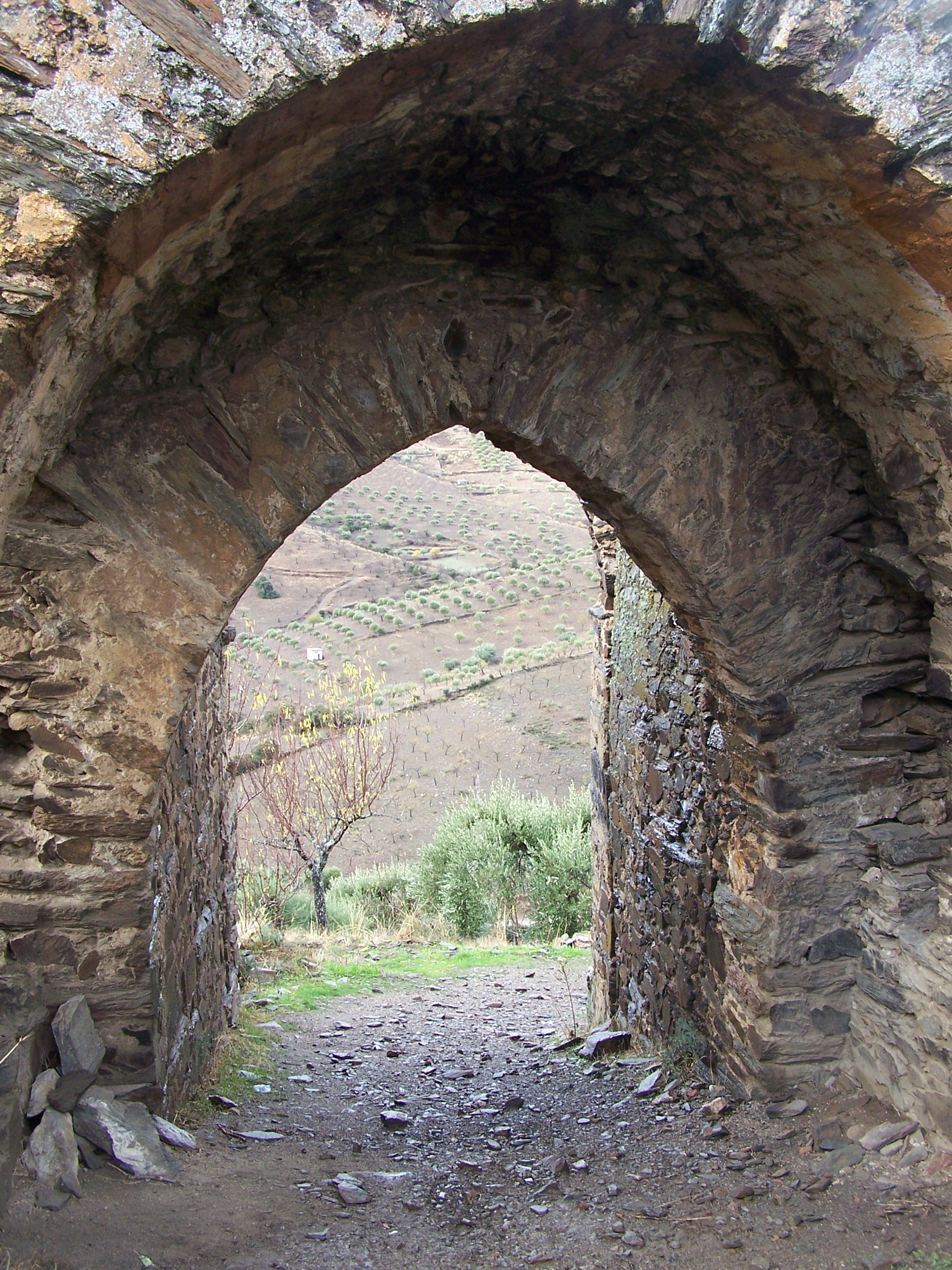
The arched gateway located in the northwest corner of the castle

The castle of Castle Melhor is situated in a rural region, 450 metres (1,480 ft) above sea level, overlooking an urban settlement on the right margin of the Côa River. The Douro River is situated some 2 kilometres (1.2 mi) to the north, while the Côa River is located 3 kilometres (1.9 mi) to the west. Its courtyard is built on the rock covered surface integrating large boulders.

The castle follows an irregular polygonal form on the hilltop. The damaged walls consist of small schist stone with 3–6 metres (9.8–19.7 ft) without merlons and access staircase to the battlements, with a triple arch gate in the northwest. A circular tower is located behind the northern wall. Between the gate and tower are the vestiges of a reinforcement wall, similar to a structure along the south wall, that indicate the former existence of a barbican. Three conical corbels are behind the eastern and northwestern portion of the wall. A circular cistern, without covering is situated in the northeast part of the courtyard, with various remnants of rectangular buildings in the courtyard.
