= Sabugal =

- Municipality
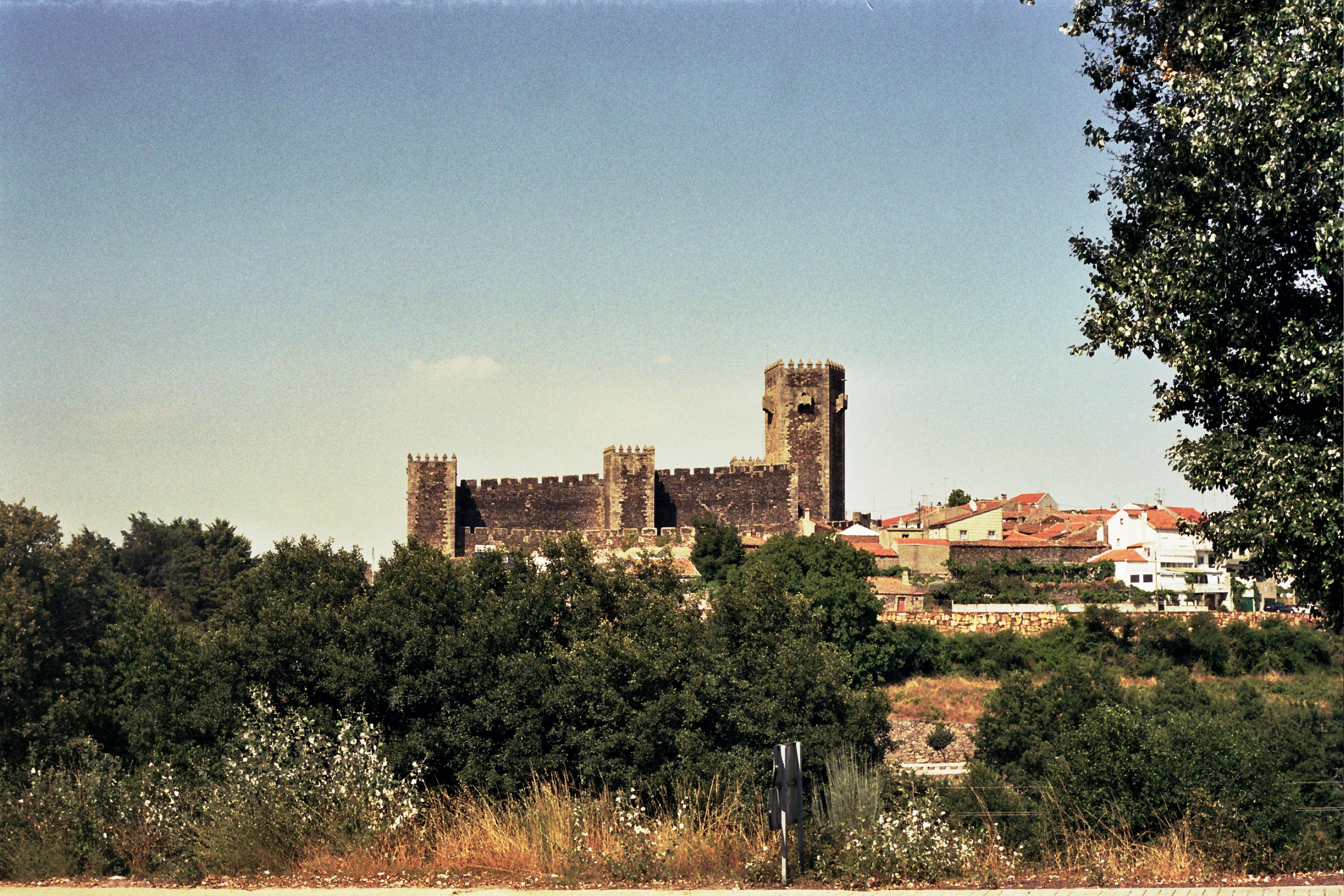
- Sabugal Castle

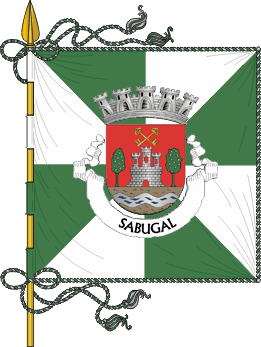
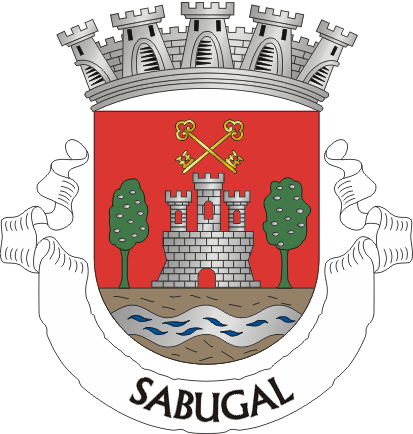
- Flag Coat of arms
- Interactive map of Sabugal
- Coordinates: 40°21′N 7°05′W
- Country: Portugal
- Region: Centro
- Intermunic. comm.: Beiras e Serra da Estrela
- District: Guarda
- Parishes: 30

Government
  - President: António Robalo (PSD)

Area
  - Total: 822.70 km^{2} (317.65 sq mi)

Population (2011)
  - Total: 12,544
  - Density: 15.247/km^{2} (39.490/sq mi)
- Time zone: UTC+00:00 (WET)
  - Summer (DST): UTC+01:00 (WEST)
- Local holiday: Monday after Octave of Easter
- Website: www.cm-sabugal.pt

Sabugal (European Portuguese pronunciation: [sɐβuˈɣal]) is a city and a municipality in the District of Guarda, Portugal. A border municipality with Spain, the population of the municipality in 2011 was 12,544, in an area of 822.70 km^{2}. The city proper, located along the Côa river, has a population of about 3,000 inhabitants. There is a castle in the city of Sabugal proper as well as other castles outside the urban centre in a number of places around the entire municipality of Sabugal. Those are the castles of Sortelha, Alfaiates, Vilar Maior and Vila do Touro. The municipal holiday is the Monday after Octave of Easter. It is also place for the Sabugal Dam built in 2000 and the river beach of Devesa, both located in the Côa river. At an elevation of roughly 750 m (2460 ft) above sea level, Sabugal is among the highest cities in Portugal.

== History ==
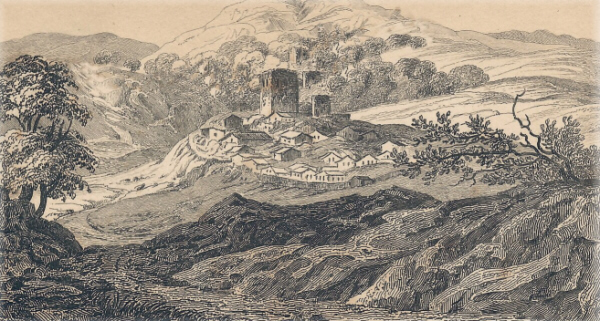
Sabugal in the 1810s

It is famed for its Gothic castle with a pentagonal outer wall and an inner wall with five square towers overlooking the Côa river. Besides its ancient castle, Sabugal was the location of the 1811 Battle of Sabugal, a Peninsular War engagement of British troops under Arthur Wellesley (later the Duke of Wellington) and French troops under the command of Marshal André Masséna, from which the British and their Portuguese allies emerged victorious. Sabugal has a Jewish heritage since at least the 16th century. In memory of the presence of Jewish communities in Sabugal, there is today an interpretation centre of the Jewish heritage, next to the castle.

== Economy ==
The economy of Sabugal includes agriculture; animal husbandry; freshwater aquaculture (i.e. trout fish farming); forestry; mining; building materials industry (including plaster industry); and food industry (including dairy industry, chestnut processing, honey production and bread making). Sabugal has made cheeses for centuries and nowadays it still is a cheese making center with both modern industrial and traditional hand made production of several types of cheeses, from goat milk cheese to cow milk cheese. Lactibar is among the main dairies of Sabugal, its cheese brand Queijo Torre is among the most sold in several local markets in Portugal. Tourism is also important in Sabugal. Thanks to the old spas in its vicinities, which date back to the Roman times although its earliest written reference goes back to the 18th century, Sabugal has become a thermal spa destination displaying in the 21st century a modern spa hotel infrastructure (i.e. Cró Hotel & Thermal Spa).

== Education ==
The city of Sabugal has all types of schools from kindergarten to the 12th grade. Higher education is available in the neighboring city of Guarda, located about 35 km away by road, which is the capital of the district.

== Sports ==
Sabugal is home to Sporting Clube do Sabugal, a multisports club founded on March 25, 1939. It has football and futsal teams as well as a judo department. The main men's football team plays in the Sabugal Municipality Stadium (Estádio Municipal do Sabugal) whose the owner is the Sabugal City Council.

== Parishes ==
Administratively, the municipality (concelho) is divided into 30 civil parishes (freguesias):

- Águas Belas
- Aldeia da Ponte
- Aldeia da Ribeira, Vilar Maior e Badamalos
- Aldeia do Bispo (Vale dos Caidos)
- Aldeia Velha
- Alfaiates
- Baraçal
- Bendada
- Bismula
- Casteleiro
- Cerdeira
- Fóios
- Lageosa da Raia
- Forcalhos
- Malcata
- Nave
- Pousafoles do Bispo, Pena Lobo e Lomba
- Quadrazais
- Quintas de São Bartolomeu
- Rapoula do Côa
- Rebolosa
- Rendo
- Ruvina, Ruivós e Vale das Éguas
- Sabugal e Aldeia de Santo António (city)
- Santo Estêvão e Moita
- Seixo do Côa e Vale Longo
- Sortelha
- Souto (town)
- Vale de Espinho
- Vila Boa
- Vila do Touro

== Notable people ==
- Manuel António Pina (1943–2012) a Portuguese journalist and writer
- Kim Prisu (born 1962 in Aldeia da Dona) a Portuguese painter.
- Joaquim Sapinho (born 1965) a Portuguese film director.
