= Francisco Maria da Veiga =

Portuguese judge

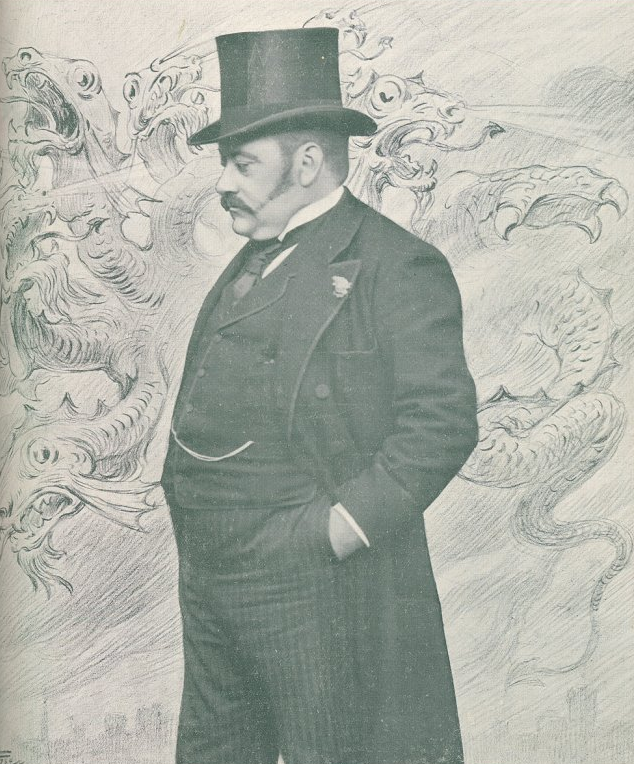
- Judge Veiga on the cover of Illustração Portugueza, 1907.
- Born: September 1852; Almendra, Vila Nova de Foz Côa, Portugal
- Died: 30 December 1934; Lisbon, Portugal
- Spouse: Joaquina Rita de São Bento Vaz Calheiros
- Father: José Caetano da Veiga
- Mother: Maria Benedita Rocha

Francisco Maria da Veiga, GCNSC, was a Portuguese judge and pro-monarchist.

== Early life ==
He completed law in University of Coimbra at the age of 20 and practiced it before becoming a magistrate.

== Career ==
In 1893, during the financial, social and political crisis that preceded the Lisbon Regicide and the 5 October 1910 revolution the Kingdom Minister João Franco made him a judge with enhanced powers to help maintain the monarchy.

He specially watched the press, republican activities and anarchists. In name of public order, he censored the anti-royal press, but most of his victims were found innocent specially because the attorney-general was the republican and Freemason Trindade Coelho.

Targeted by the press, he was caricatured with a police uniform and the blue pencil of censorship.
