= Villar de la Yegua =

- Municipality
- Coat of arms

- Location in Salamanca

- Location in Spain
- Coordinates: 40°43′1″N 6°42′0″W
- Country: Spain
- Autonomous community: Castile and León
- Province: Salamanca
- Comarca: Comarca de Ciudad Rodrigo
- Subcomarca: Campo de Argañán

Government
  - Mayor: Luis Miguel Baz Garduño (People's Party)

Area
  - Total: 56 km^{2} (22 sq mi)
- Elevation: 713 m (2,339 ft)

Population (2025-01-01)
  - Total: 151
  - Density: 2.7/km^{2} (7.0/sq mi)
- Time zone: UTC+1 (CET)
  - Summer (DST): UTC+2 (CEST)
- Postal code: 37488

Villar de la Yegua is a municipality located in the province of Salamanca, Castile and León, Spain. As of 2016 (data from INE), the municipality has a population of 198 inhabitants.

The municipal territory is home to the Siega Verde Paleolithic art site, included in the UNESCO World Heritage List in 2010.

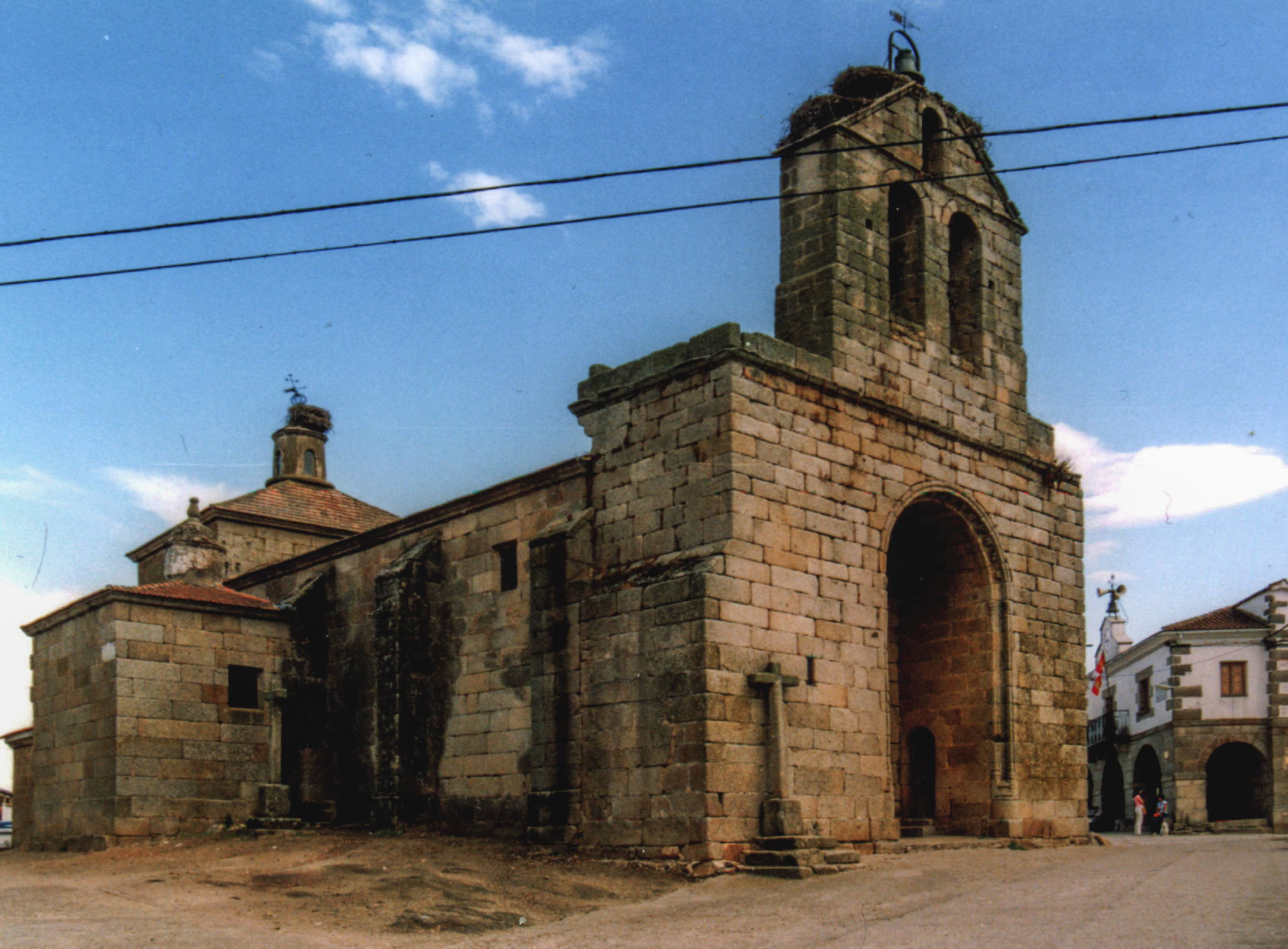
Parish church of t. John the Baptist in Villar de la Yegua.
