= Cedovim =

- Civil parish
- Location in Portugal
- Coordinates: 41.026°N 7.309°W
- Country: Portugal
- Region: Norte
- Intermunic. comm.: Douro
- District: Guarda
- Municipality: Vila Nova de Foz Côa

Area
  - Total: 32.10 km^{2} (12.39 sq mi)

Population (2011)
  - Total: 338
  - Density: 10.5/km^{2} (27.3/sq mi)
- Time zone: UTC+00:00 (WET)
  - Summer (DST): UTC+01:00 (WEST)

Cedovim is a civil parish in the municipality of Vila Nova de Foz Côa, Portugal. The population in 2011 was 338, in an area of 32.10 km^{2}.

== Heritage ==
- Church of Cedovim
- Chapel of Saint Anthony
- Chapel of Saint Marina
- Chapel of Saint Sebastian
- Chapel of Saint Mary Magdalene
- House of Nossa Senhora da Conceição, also known as Casa Grande de Cedovim or the Manor House of the Azeredo Teixeira de Aguilar family, Viscounts and Counts of Samodães
- Tavares House
- Pillory of Cedovim
