= Sabugal Castle =

Portuguese castle

Coordinates: 40.3514°N 7.0942°W

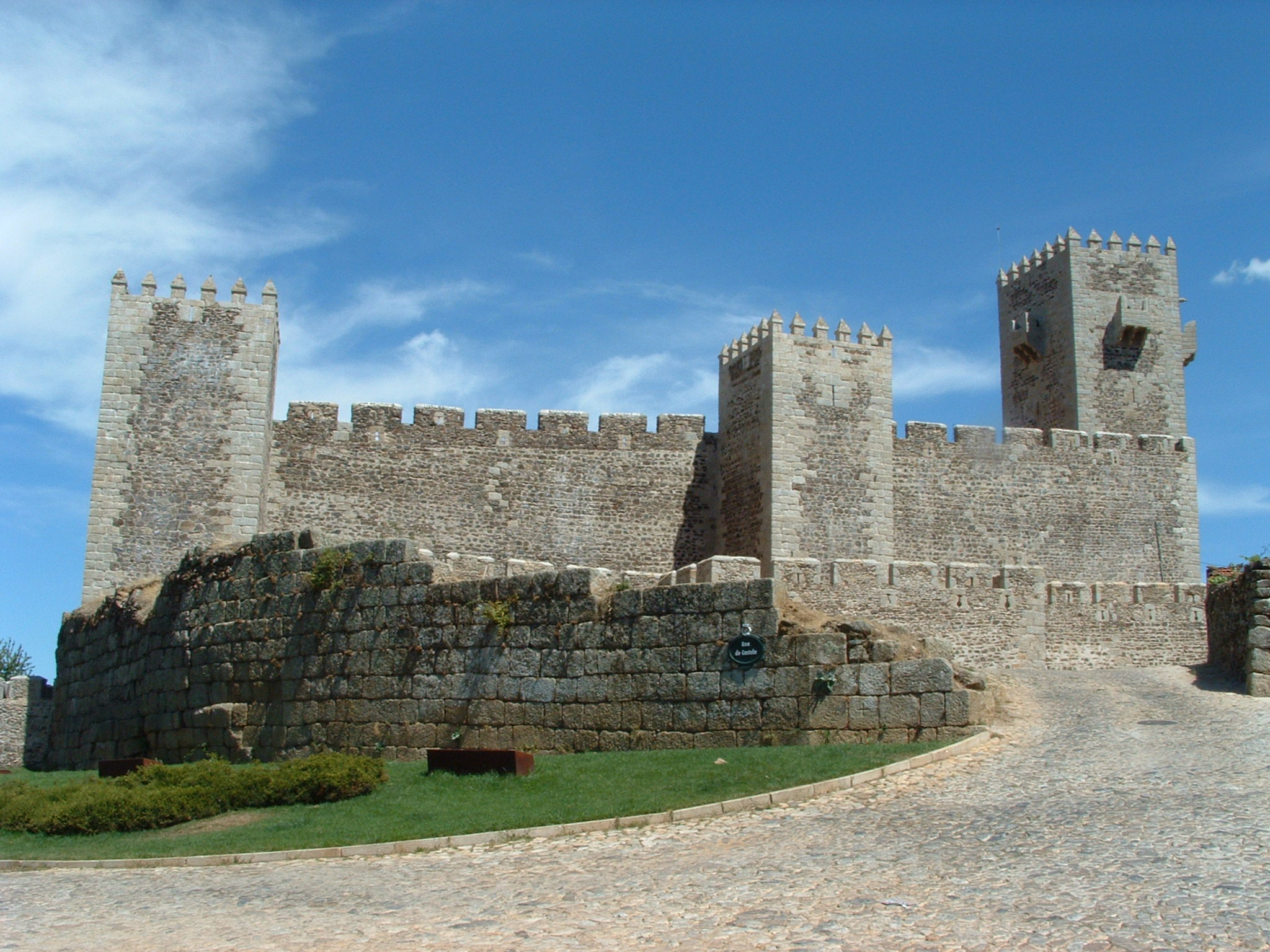
Sabugal Castle

The Sabugal Castle is a castle in the city of Sabugal, near the Côa river, in central Portugal. With a pentagonal outer wall and an inner wall with five square towers, this castle is an example of Gothic architecture in Portugal.
