= Sabugal e Aldeia de Santo António =

- Civil parish
- Location in Portugal
- Coordinates: 40.352°N 7.090°W
- Country: Portugal
- Region: Centro
- Intermunic. comm.: Beiras e Serra da Estrela
- District: Guarda
- Municipality: Sabugal

Area
  - Total: 56.34 km^{2} (21.75 sq mi)

Population (2011)
  - Total: 2,741
  - Density: 49/km^{2} (130/sq mi)
- Time zone: UTC+00:00 (WET)
  - Summer (DST): UTC+01:00 (WEST)

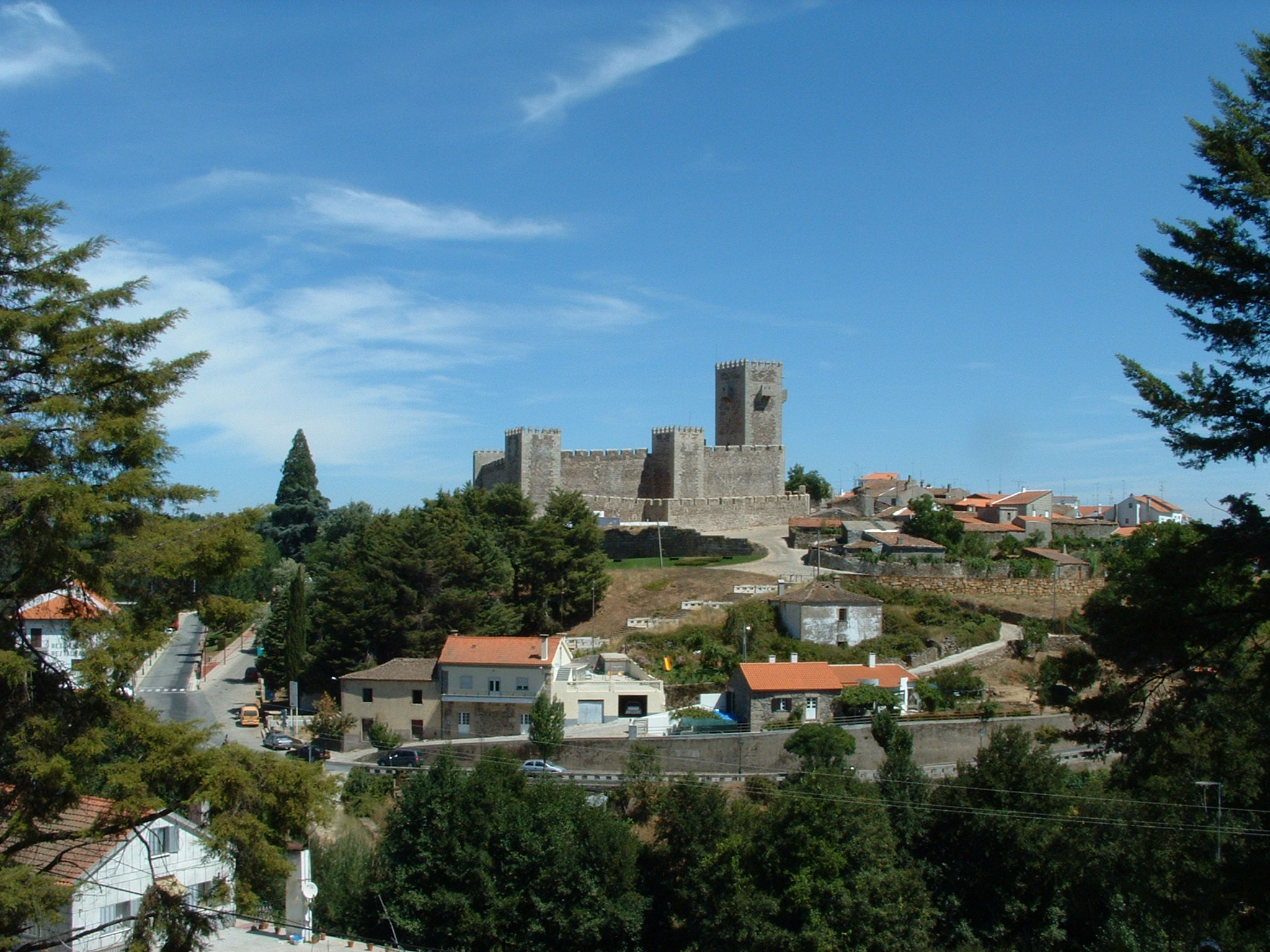
Sabugal Castle, Portugal

Sabugal e Aldeia de Santo António is a civil parish in the municipality of Sabugal, Portugal. It was formed in 2013 by the merger of the former parishes Sabugal and Aldeia de Santo António. The population in 2011 was 2,741, in an area of 56.34 km^{2}. It is the main core of the city of Sabugal.
