= João Pimenta =

Portuguese footballer

João Nuno Cabral Pimenta (born 12 July 1985) is a Portuguese football player. Pimenta started at Sporting Clube de Portugal and is playing for S.C. Covilhã.

He was on loan at Portimonense S.C. and Associação Naval 1º de Maio for periods of time.

Born in Vila Nova de Foz Côa, Portugal, Pimenta stands 5 ft and 5 inches (170 cm), weighs about 132 pounds (60 kg), and plays left winger.
