= Côa River =

Tributary of the Douro River

Coordinates: 41.0809°N 7.1047°W

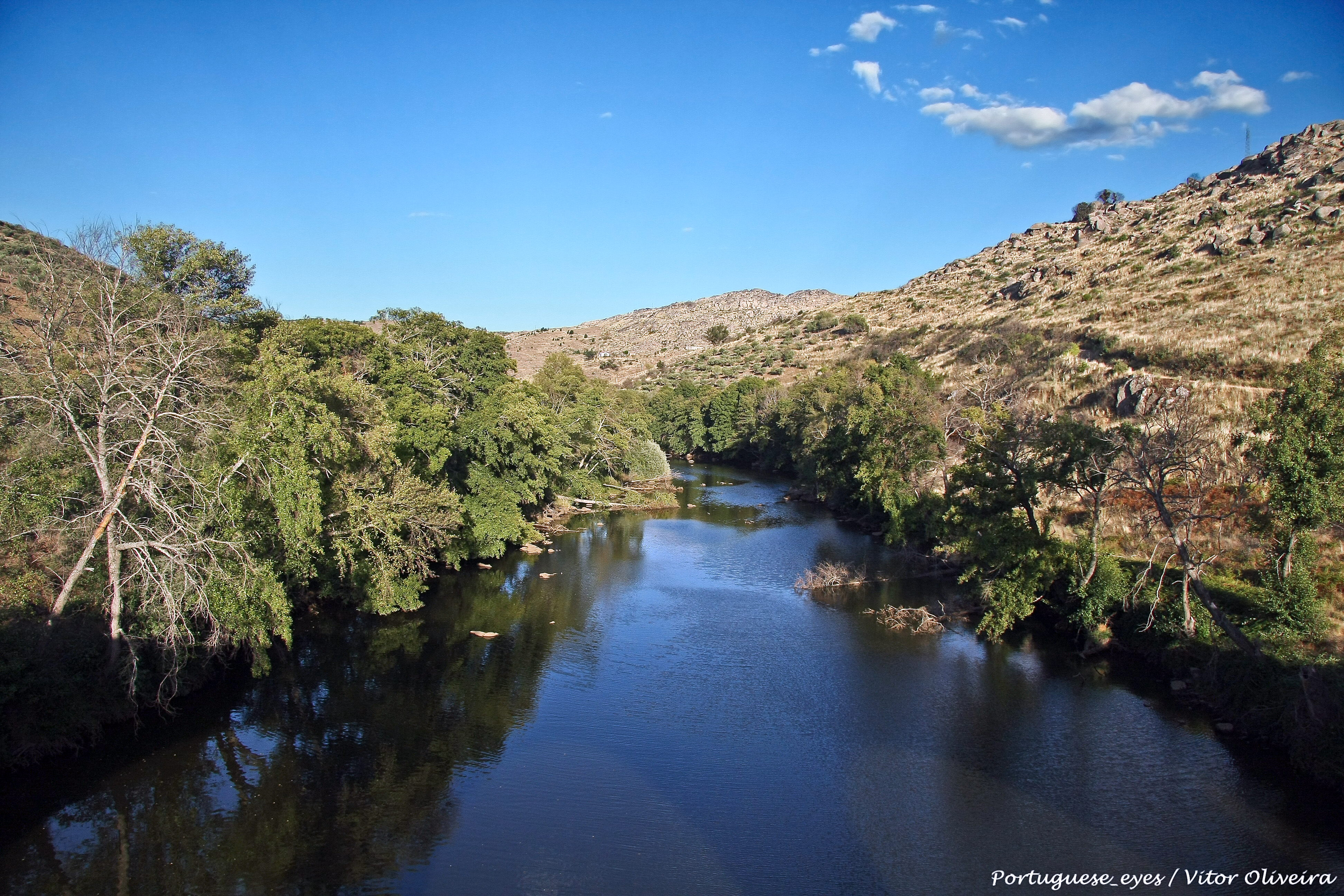
Côa River, Figueira de Castelo Rodrigo

The Côa River (Portuguese pronunciation: [ˈkoɐ]) is a tributary of the Douro River, in central and northeastern Portugal. It is one of the few Portuguese rivers that flows south to north. It flows through the municipalities of Sabugal, Almeida, Pinhel, Figueira de Castelo Rodrigo and Vila Nova de Foz Côa, all located in the Guarda District. Over 100,000 ha (247,105 acres) of land in the Greater Côa Valley have been set aside for rewilding and conservation as Natura 2000 areas.

There are several castles along Terras de Riba-Côa, such as the Castle of Sabugal and the Castle of Pinhel.

== Paleolithic Art ==
Thousands of ancient carvings in stone were discovered in the Côa Valley in the 1980s and 1990s. These are of particular interest due to the high concentration of Paleolithic art, and because these carvings are found outside of caves, on rocks in plain sight: Jean Clottes, a prominent French prehistorian, had confirmed that "is the biggest open air site of paleolithic art in Europe, if not in the world". Subsequent researches have led to a consensus that the images there belong to two groups: highly visible pecked Gravettian figures and smaller, less visible Magdalenian engravings.

The drawings attracted worldwide attention when plans to build a hydroelectric dam across the Côa Valley threatened to submerge them. Although hydroelectric development was already well underway, outcry from locals, the scientific community and the media led to dam construction being halted in 1995 after a change in the national government following elections. A significant proportion of the drawings in the Canada do Inferno area were already underwater by that time. The Côa Valley Archaeological Park, opened in 1996, was declared a protected UNESCO world heritage site in 1998.

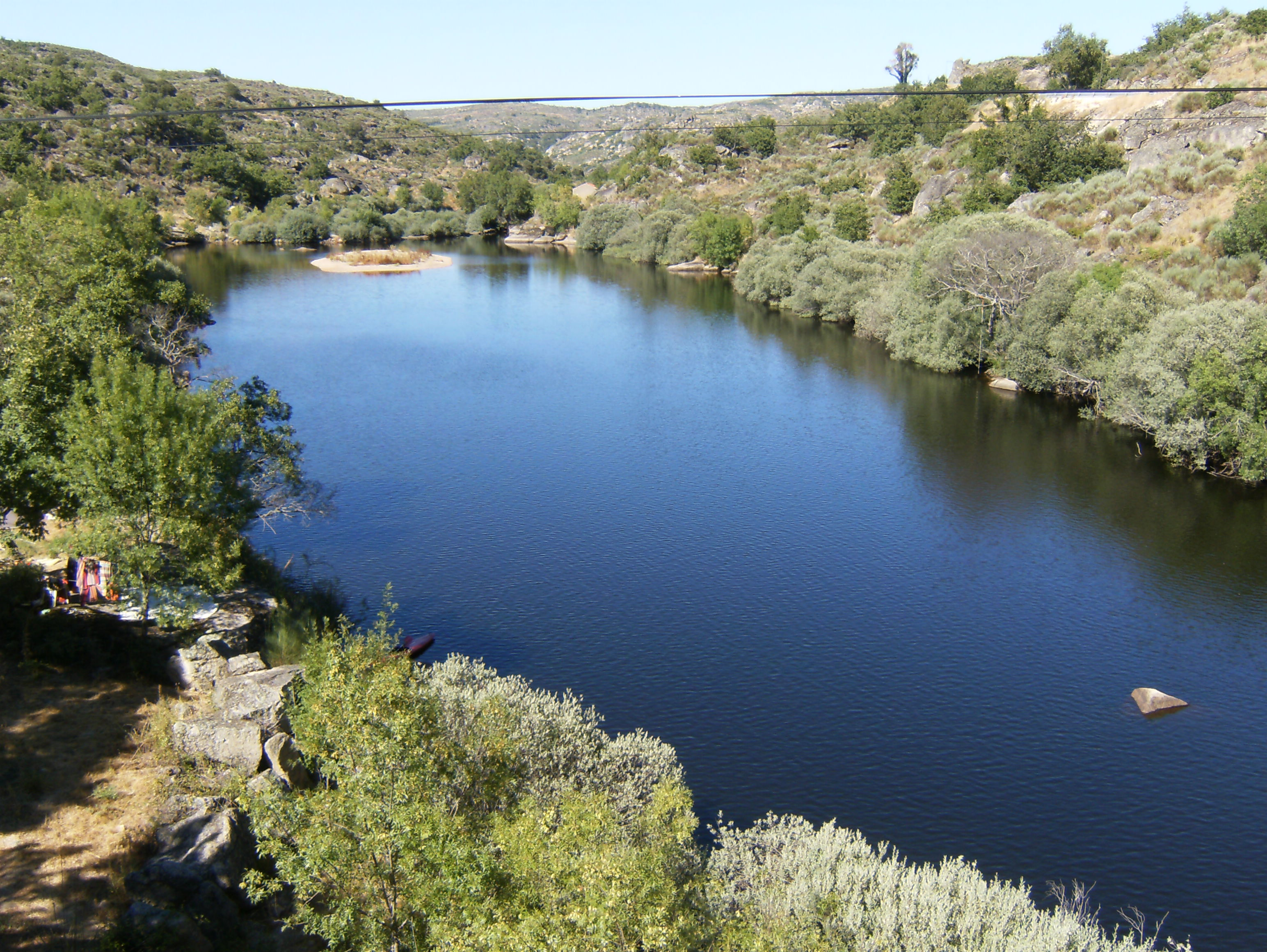
Rio Côa junto à Ponte de São Roque (Castelo Bom, Almeida)

== History ==
The Côa river was the site of the Côa Battle during the Peninsular War.
