= Prehistoric Rock Art Sites in the Côa Valley and Siega Verde =

Paleolithic archaeological site in Portugal

UNESCO World Heritage Site
- Interactive map of Prehistoric Rock Art Sites in the Côa Valley and Siega Verde
- Official name: Prehistoric Rock Art Sites in the Côa Valley and Siega Verde
- Criteria: (i), (iii)
- Reference: 866
- Inscription: 1998 (22nd Session)
- Extensions: 2010

Prehistoric Rock Art Sites in the Côa Valley and Siega Verde are a United Nations Educational, Scientific and Cultural Organization (UNESCO) transboundary World Heritage Site, located in the Côa Valley of Portugal and Siega Verde, Spain.

== Côa Valley ==
Prehistoric Rock-Art Site of the Côa Valley
- 41°02′N 7°07′W
- Type: Prehistoric art
- Location: Guarda, Douro, Norte, Portugal
- Part of: Prehistoric Rock Art Sites in the Côa Valley and Siega Verde

Site notes
- Length: 17,000 m (56,000 ft)
- Area: 200 km^{2} (77 sq mi)
- Archaeologists: Unknown
- Owner: Portuguese Republic
- Public access: Public
- Website: http://www.arte-coa.pt/

The Prehistoric Rock-Art Site of the Côa Valley is an open-air Paleolithic archaeological site located in northeastern Portugal, near the border with Spain.

In the early 1990s, rock engravings were discovered in Vila Nova de Foz Côa during the construction of a dam in the Côa River valley. They include thousands of engraved rock drawings of horses, bovines and other animals, human and abstract figures, dated from 22,000 to 10,000 years B.C. The sites were reviewed by archaeologists and other specialists of UNESCO and other agencies. Public support grew, both within Portugal and internationally, for preservation of the archaeological artifacts and rock paintings. In 1995 elections led to a change in government resulting in the cancellation of the dam project.

Since 1995, a team of archaeologists have been studying and cataloging this prehistoric complex. The Archaeological Park of the Côa Valley (Portuguese: Parque Arqueológico do Vale do Côa (PAVC)) was created to receive visitors and research the findings, and the Côa Museum was constructed here following a major design competition.

=== History ===
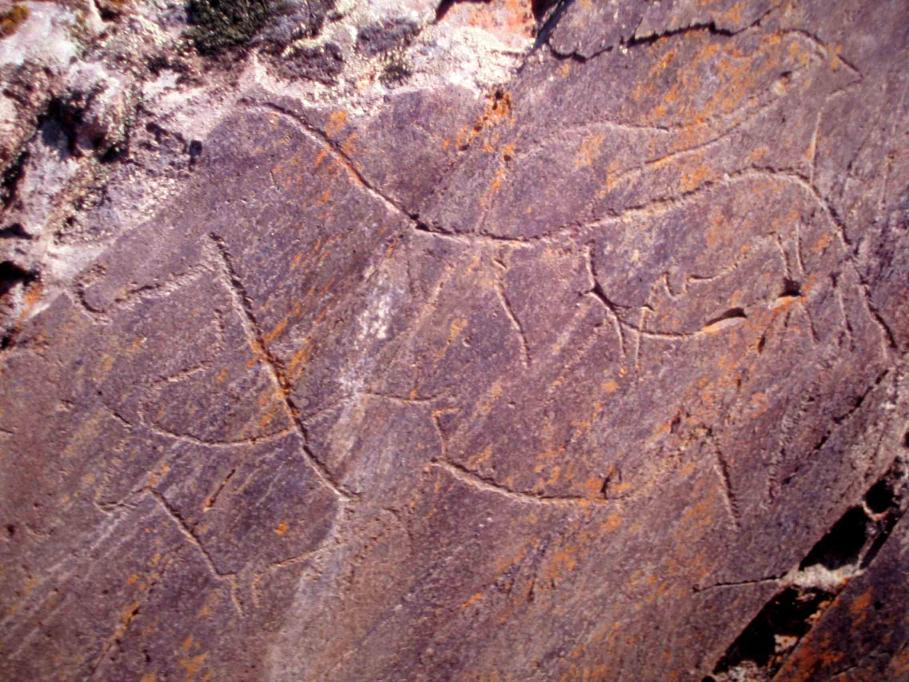
Carvings of various zoomorphic creatures, including in particular, a horse

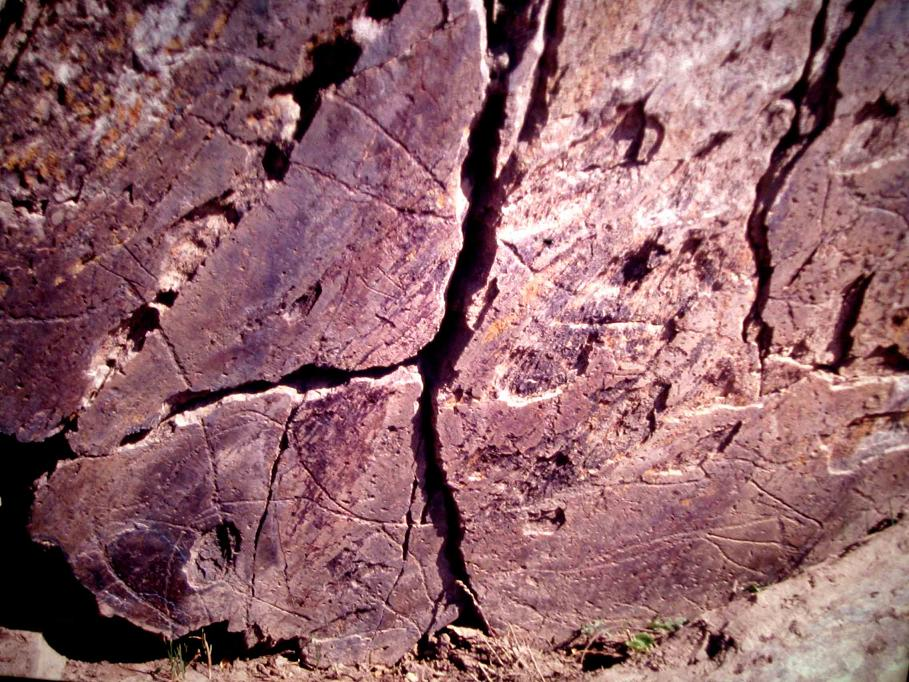
Paleolithic rock engravings breaking the natural rock formation

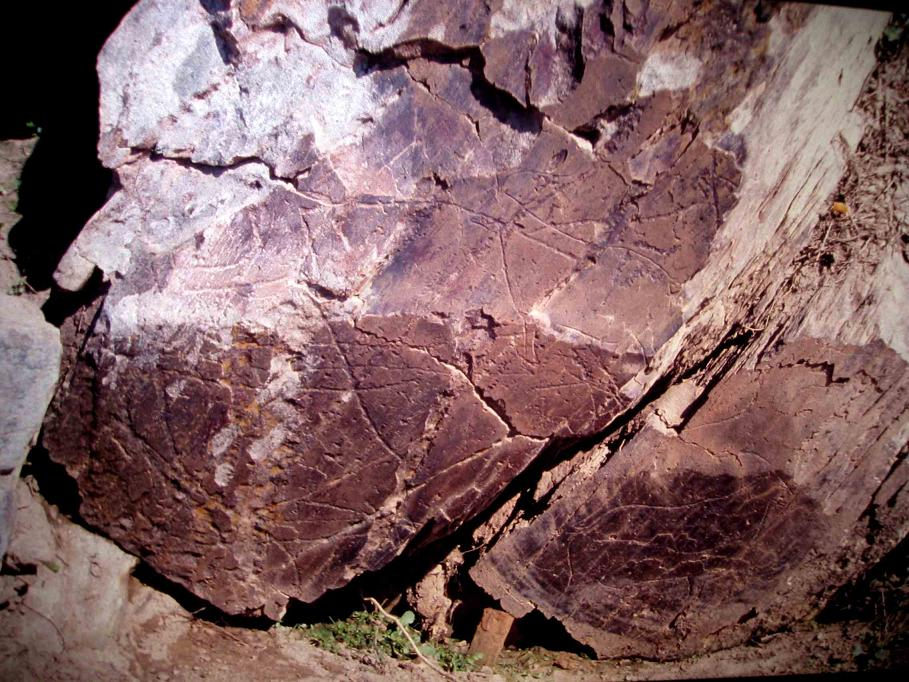
Various zoomorphic and anthropomorphic designs on granite slabs

The earliest drawings appearing in the Côa Valley date between 22 and 20 thousand years B.C., consisting of zoomorphic imagery of nature. Between 20 and 18 thousand B.C. (Solutrean period), a secondary group of animal drawings included examples of horses. There was greater elaboration during 16–10 thousand years B.C. (Magdalenian period), with a Paleolithic style. The essentially anthropomorphic and zoomorphic designs included horses identifiable by their characteristic manes, aurochs with mouths and nostrils detailed, and deer.

Other paintings dating back to the Epipaleolithic period were of zoomorphic semi-naturalist design. Some anthropomorphic and zoomorphic designs, both geometric and abstract, date from the Neolithic period. Others, primarily anthropomorphic, date back to the Chalcolithic and Bronze Age.

Between the 5th and 1st centuries BC, early organized societies produced anthropomorphic and zoomorphic carvings that include weapons and symbols.

The most recent era of recorded rock art dates from the 17th to 20th centuries and includes religious, anthropomorphic and zoomorphic designs, inscriptions and dates. The most recent of these include representations of boats, trains, bridges, planes and representations of various scenes, including drawings completed by António Seixas and Alcino Tomé.

==== 20th century ====
In the 20th century, the construction of the Pocinho Dam and its associated reservoir likely resulted in the immersion of many rock cliff drawings. By the 1990s, prospectors revealed a group of important Paleolithic, Neolithic and Chalcolithic carvings in the lower part of the Côa Valley, likely in November 1991 by Nelson Rabanda (articles were not published on this work until November 1994). Later, António Martinho Baptista would determine that Iron Age carvings corresponded to works by Celtic-Iberian tribes, specifically the Medobrigenais or Zoilos. Some of these cultures were identified for the first time with the Côa findings.

In 1995, a plan to construct a dam was approved and works began in the Côa Valley. However, following the original discovery of rock art, an archaeologist had been investigating the Côa valley under the direction of the national energy company (Energias de Portugal – EDP) and the agency responsible for architectural heritage (Instituto Português do Património Arquitectónico – IPPAR). Both were made aware of the prehistoric art along the Côa, earlier than the general public and scientific community. Archaeologist Nélson Rabanda, studying the site under an agreement between EDP and IPPAR, reported the case to the press and other organizations interested in prehistoric art and heritage, such as UNESCO. There was a move by EDP to disprove the age of the carvings in order to continue the dam project, despite the damage it would do to the findings.

National controversy around the case forced IPPAR to petition UNESCO for a review of the site. In December 1994, Jean Clottes came to the region to investigate the discoveries. The UNESCO reports were not unanimous on whether the power plant should be cancelled; Clottes, the head of prehistoric department, noted that rising water may protect the engravings from vandalism, but also confirmed that Coa Valley "is the biggest open air site of palaeolithic art in Europe, if not in the world". At the time, the number of known carvings was smaller but there was suspicion that many more had already been submerged by the completed Pocinho Dam. This was confirmed by Nelson Rabanda, who investigated the submerged Canada do Inferno site and found more carvings. Archaeologists discovered other sites in the areas of Penascosa, Ribeira de Piscos, Quinta da Barca, Vermelhosa, Vale de José Esteves, among others, and quickly published their discoveries and took the matter to national media. A citizens group, Movimento para a Salvação das Gravuras do Côa, arose with a slogan, "As gravuras não sabem nadar" (The carvings don't know how to swim), an allusion to a major hit song of the time, Black Company's "Nadar".

A second UNESCO team, led by Mounir Bouchenaki, director of the World Heritage branch, was sent to conclude the case. His team determined that a great part of the carvings dated as far back as the Palaeolithic. The Portuguese government's insistence in proceeding with the dam project led to mounting political scandal and pressure from the international community. The dam project was denounced in international newspapers such as The Sunday Times, The New York Times, the International Herald Tribune, and broadcasters such as the BBC.

Meanwhile, after the visit by the UNESCO delegation, IPPAR created an international scientific commission to accompany the study of the art in the Côa valley. This was considered controversial. It included António Beltrán, E. Anati and Jean Clottes, and met in May 1994. EDP continued to promote other methods of "saving" the prehistoric art (such as creating moulds or carving the panels from the cliff faces), while still promoting the continuation of the dam project. EDP was also helped by the direct dating controversy; Robert Bednarik and Alan Watchman, in addition to Fred Phillips and Ronald Dorn, used an unproven methodology to affirm that the carvings were not Palaeolithic. These events displeased archaeologists and the public. A broad-based movement against the dam developed. In 1995, general elections resulted in a government change. Incoming Prime Minister António Guterres cancelled the dam project in November 1995.

The government established a system to monitor and preserve the archeological resources; the events of the so-called "Battle of Côa" led to the establishment in May 1997 of the National Centre for Prehistoric Art (Portuguese: Centro Nacional de Arte Rupestre/CNART) and the Archaeological Park of the Côa Valley (Portuguese: Parque Arqueológico do Vale do COa/PAVC)), the Portuguese Institute of Archaeology (Portuguese: Instituto Português de Arqueologia, as well as dependent agencies. The National Centre for Aquatic and Subaquatic Archaeology (Portuguese: Centro Nacional de Arqueologia Náutica e Subaquática/CNANS) opened in August 1996.

The Prehistoric Rock-Art Sites in the Côa Valley were designated a World Heritage Site by UNESCO in 1998 (from an advisory board report on 25 June 1997).

==== 21st century ====
In 2003, a study analysed the viability of introducing the Przewalski horse in the area, a species related to those portrayed in the Paleolithic rock art.

By May 2004, a public tender was commissioned by the Portuguese Order of Architects to design the Côa Museum, won by architects Tiago Pimentel and Camilo Rebelo. On 26 January 2007, construction of the Côa Museum begun.

More excavations were done in Fariseu from 19 September to October 2005, under the direction of Thierry Aubry, who discovered several slabs of schist (10 x 20 centimetres) dating to the Paleolithic.

The conference HERITAGE 2008 – World Heritage and Sustainable Development International Conference took place at Vila Nova de Foz Côa between 7–9 May 2008. The conference examined the relationships between heritage, human development, natural environment and building preservation, and promoted significant discussion, organized by the Portuguese Ministry of Culture.

In August 2010, the World Heritage Committee extended the UNESCO world heritage extension to neighbouring site of Siega Verde in Spain. The Siega Verde site, with comparable carvings/etchings in 94 panels along a 15 kilometre stretch across the border includes over 500 representations. Its dating to a similar period allowed its inclusion in the world heritage designation along with the Côa Valley sites.

In March 2018, the Côa Valley Sites and Museum were added to the Cultural Routes of the Council of Europe, along other major prehistoric sites like Lascaux (France), Altamira (Spain) and Valcamonica (Italy).

=== Geography ===
The prehistoric site can be accessed from EN102 road (Vila Nova de Foz Côa-Celorico da Beira), via Muxagata, or alternately via the EN222 road (Vila Nova de Foz Côa-Figueira de Castelo Rodrigo) via Castelo Melhor. It reaches parts of the municipalities of Figueira de Castelo Rodrigo, Mêda, Pinhel and Vila Nova de Foz Côa.

The lower portion of Côa River Valley runs south to north, at about 130 metres above sea level, spread over an area of 17 km^{2} (6.6 sq mi). The watercourse is flanked by rolling/undulating hills, surrounded by rare species of river brush, vineyards, olive and almond trees, with the higher areas occupied by pasture and fields. At about the 17 kilometre mark, the relief is rocky with granite and schist outcroppings.

The Côa Valley archaeological park comprises 23 sites with engravings or paintings, along the final 17 kilometres of the River Côa, with ten sites on the left bank and eight on the right bank. In addition, five sites are located along other tributaries of the Douro River, spread in three different nuclei: Faia, Quinta da Barca and Penacosa, along the mouth of the Ribeira de Piscos, in an area of 20,000 hectares.

Of the 23 prehistoric Rock-Art sites, 14 are classified:

- Broeira (Vila Nova de Foz Côa)
- Canada do Inferno/Rego da Vide (Foz Côa)
- Faia (Pinhel)
- Faia/Vale Afonsinho (Figueira de Castelo Rodrigo)
- Fonte Frieira (Foz Côa)
- Meijapão (Foz Côa)
- Penascosa (Foz Côa)
- Quinta da Barca (Foz Côa)
- Quinta do Fariseu (Foz Côa)
- Ribeirinha (Foz Côa)
- Ribeira de Piscos/Quinta dos Poios (Foz Côa)
- Vale da Figueira/Teixugo (Foz Côa)
- Vale de Moinhos (Foz Côa)
- Vale dos Namorados (Foz Côa)

Nine sites are in ongoing classification process:

- Alto da Bulha
- Canada da Moreira
- Moinhos de Cima
- Vale de Cabrões
- Vale da Casa
- Vale de Forno
- Vale de José Esteves
- Vale de Videiro
- Vermelhosa

=== Art ===
The prehistoric art is either carved, incised or picked, combining various techniques, but rarely painted, utilizing the vertical schist slabs as canvass. These schist rocks, along the northern part of the Côa River, are large drawings in contrast with smaller depictions in areas. Their size varies between 15 cm (5.91 in) and 180 cm (70.87 in), but most are 40–50 centimetres in extension, often forming panels and compositions. The style often features bold lines, but many are touched with fine, thin lines.

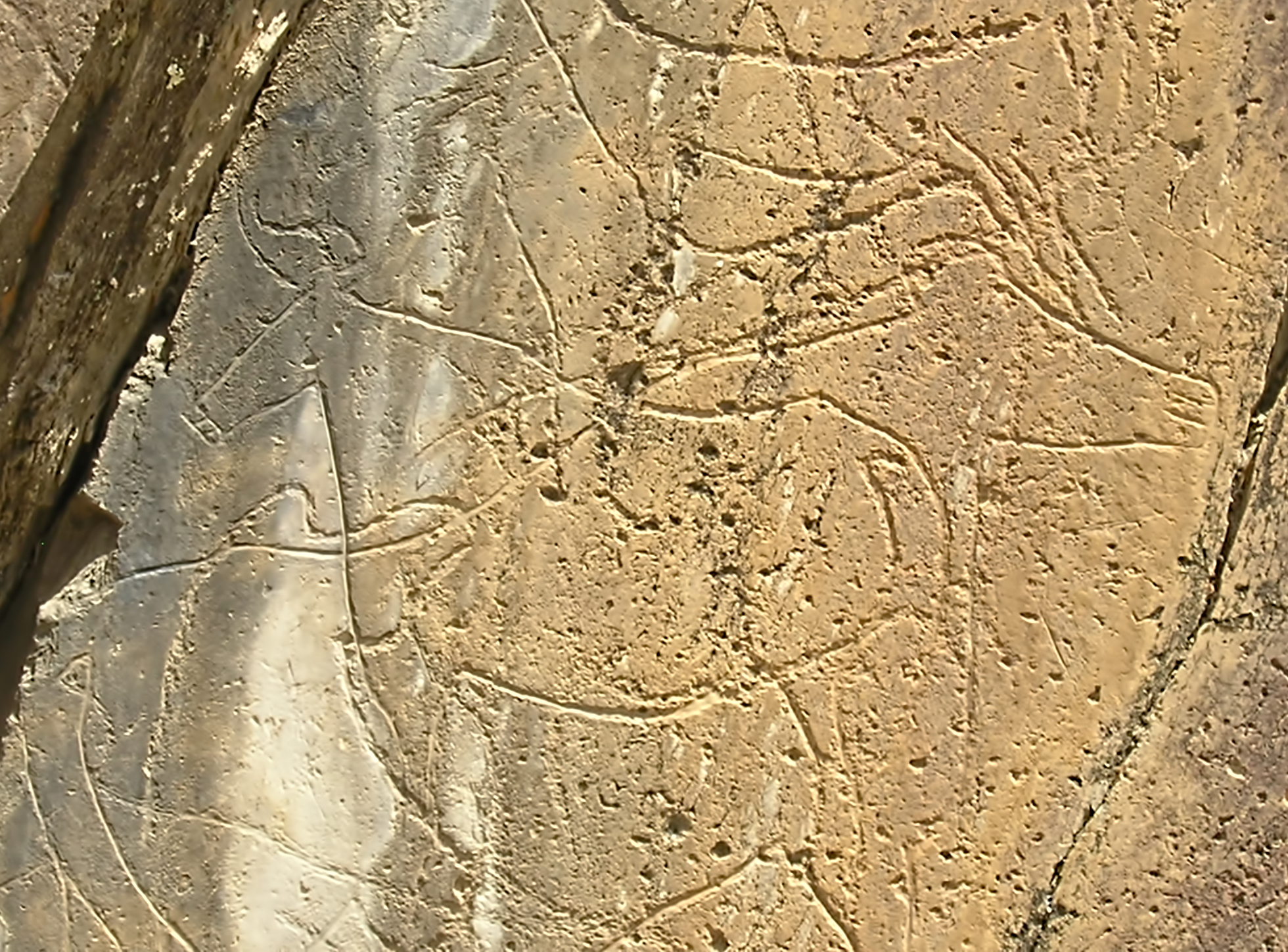
Prehistoric Rock-Art Site of the Côa Valley – Penascosa – Bull

The art in the Faia site occupies several vertical panels of granite. Two groups of authors were identified in this region, including 230 carvings from the Epipaleolithic and Bronze Ages.

The more archaic period of Côa corresponds to 137 rocks with 1000 carvings and rare paintings, by artists who concentrated on zoomorphic representations: equine (horses), bovine (aurochs), caprines and deer (the latter primarily associated with the final phase of the Magdalense period). There are also representations of fish, intermediary animals, along with a small group of geometric or abstract shapes (including lines and symbols in Penascosa and Canada do Inferno).

In one of the rarer depictions, there is a solitary anthropomorphic figure with a phallus, dating to the Magdalenense period in the Ribeira de Piscos site. The artists' motives are unclear, and the image appears isolated and over-drawn by other figures.

At the Faia site, there are unique painted carvings, with ocre paint highlighting the nostrils and mouth of a figure. Other groups of carvings in Vale Cabrões and Faia, dating from the Epipaleolithic and Neolithic, include zoomorphic designs, also painted with ocre.

There are also Iron Age sites along the mouth of the Côa in the valleys of smaller Douro river tributaries. They include anthropomorphic figures and horses, in addition to some dogs, deer and birds, accompanied by weapons (swords, lances and shields). These armed warriors could represent scenes from battles or hunting parties. Generally, these images are stratified, with new designs drawn over the pre-existing carvings.

The last period of art dates from the modern era, and includes religious motifs, both anthropomorphic and zoomorphic figures, in addition to inscriptions, dates, boats, trains, bridges, planes and landscapes.

The importance of this prehistoric art site is due to its rareness and extension. Although there are numerous prehistoric art sites in caves, open-air sites are rarer (including Mazouco (Portugal), Campôme (France) and Siega Verde (Spain), and few spread over 17 kilometres. Archaeologists acknowledge sites like this as open-air sanctuaries of prehistoric humankind, with particular relevance to West European Hunter-Gatherer (WHG) history.

== Siega Verde ==
Siega Verde
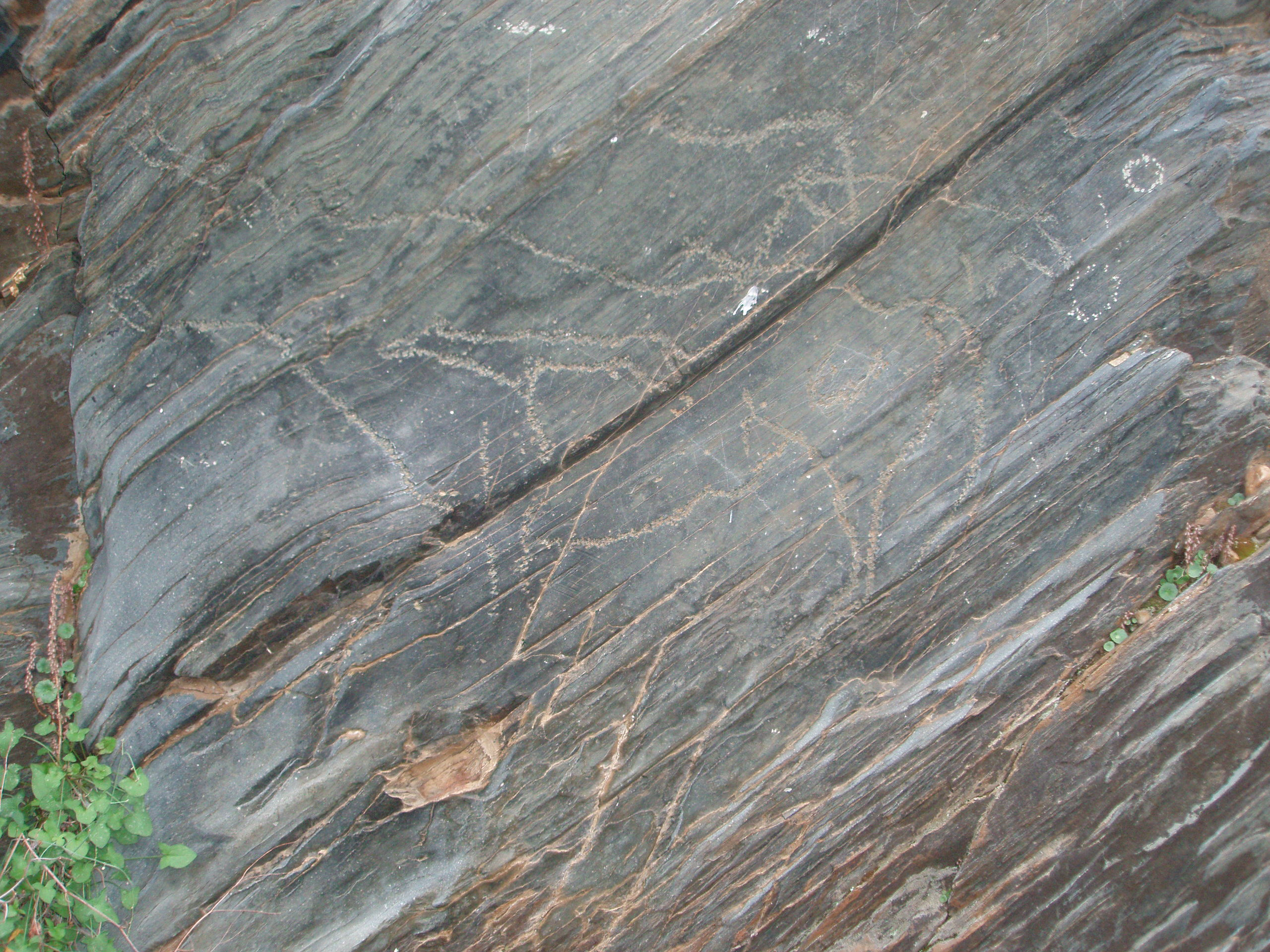
- Engravings of animals.

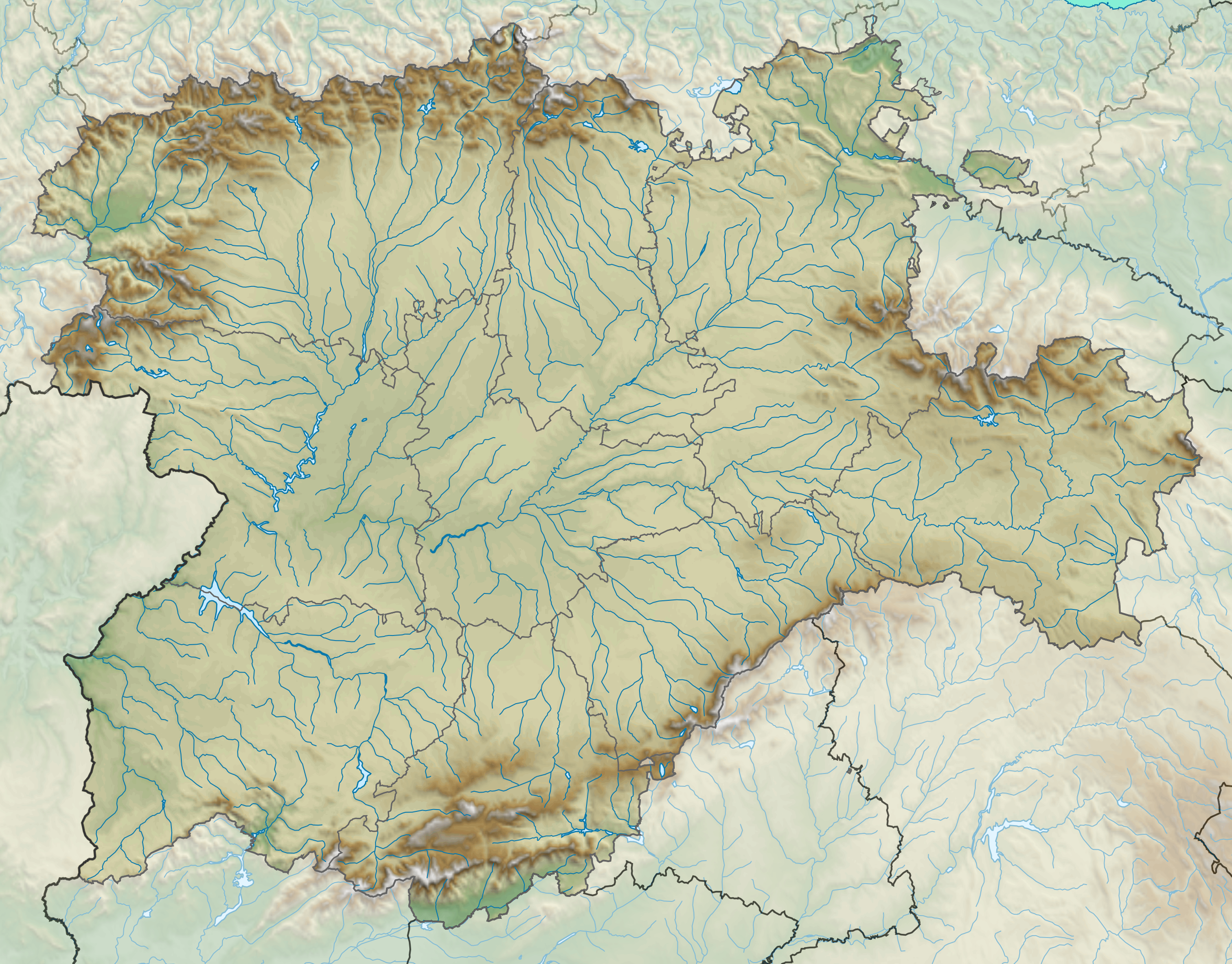
- Location within Castile and León
- 40°41′51″N 6°39′40″W
- Location: Serranillo, Villar de la Yegua, Castile and León, Spain
- Part of: Prehistoric Rock Art Sites in the Côa Valley and Siega Verde

Site notes
- Area: 0.9 ha (2.2 acres)

Siega Verde (Spanish pronunciation: [ˈsjeɣa ˈβeɾðe]; 40°41′51″N 6°39′40″W) is an archaeological site in Serranillo, Villar de la Yegua, province of Salamanca, in Castile and León, Spain. It was added to the Côa Valley Paleolithic Art site in the World Heritage List in 2010.

The site consists of a series of rock carvings, discovered in 1988 by professor Manuel Santoja Gómez, during an inventory campaign of archaeological sites in the valley of the Águeda river. Subjects include equids, aurochs, deer and goats, among the most common ones, as well as bison, reindeer and the woolly rhinoceros, which were not yet extinct at the time.

The engravings date to the Gravettian culture of the Upper Palaeolithic (circa 20,000 years ago). There are also more recent, anthropomorphic representations, dating to the Magdalenian age (c. 9,000 years ago). There are a total of 91 panels, spanning some 1 kilometers of rock.

== See also ==
- List of Stone Age art

== Bibliography ==
- Balbín Behrmann, Rodrigo de; Alcolea González, Javier; Santonja, Manuel; Pérez Martín, Rosario (1991). "Siega Verde (Salamanca). Yacimiento paleolítico al aire libre". Del Paleolítico a la Historia. Museo de Salamanca.
- Bednarik, Robert G. (2009). "Fluvial erosion of inscriptions and petroglyphs at Siega Verde, Spain" (PDF). Journal of Archaeological Science. 36 (10): 2365–2373. doi:10.1016/j.jas.2009.06.019. hdl:10400.26/23495.
- Vázquez Marcos, Carlos (2011). "Grafías postpaleolíticas en el yacimiento de Siega Verde (Salamanca)" (PDF). Actas das IV Jornadas de Jovens em Investigaçao Arqueológica. Vol. 1. pp. 127–132. ISBN 978-989-97666-2-4.
- Vázquez Marcos, Carlos (2019). "El arte Paleolítico de Siega Verde (Serranillo, Salamanca, España): Una sintética visión en el trigésimo aniversario de su descubrimiento". Estudos do Quaternário / Quaternary Studies (19): 63–82. doi:10.30893/eq.v0i19.180. hdl:10400.26/27782. Archived from the original on 21 March 2020.
