= Vila Nova de Foz Côa =

- Municipality
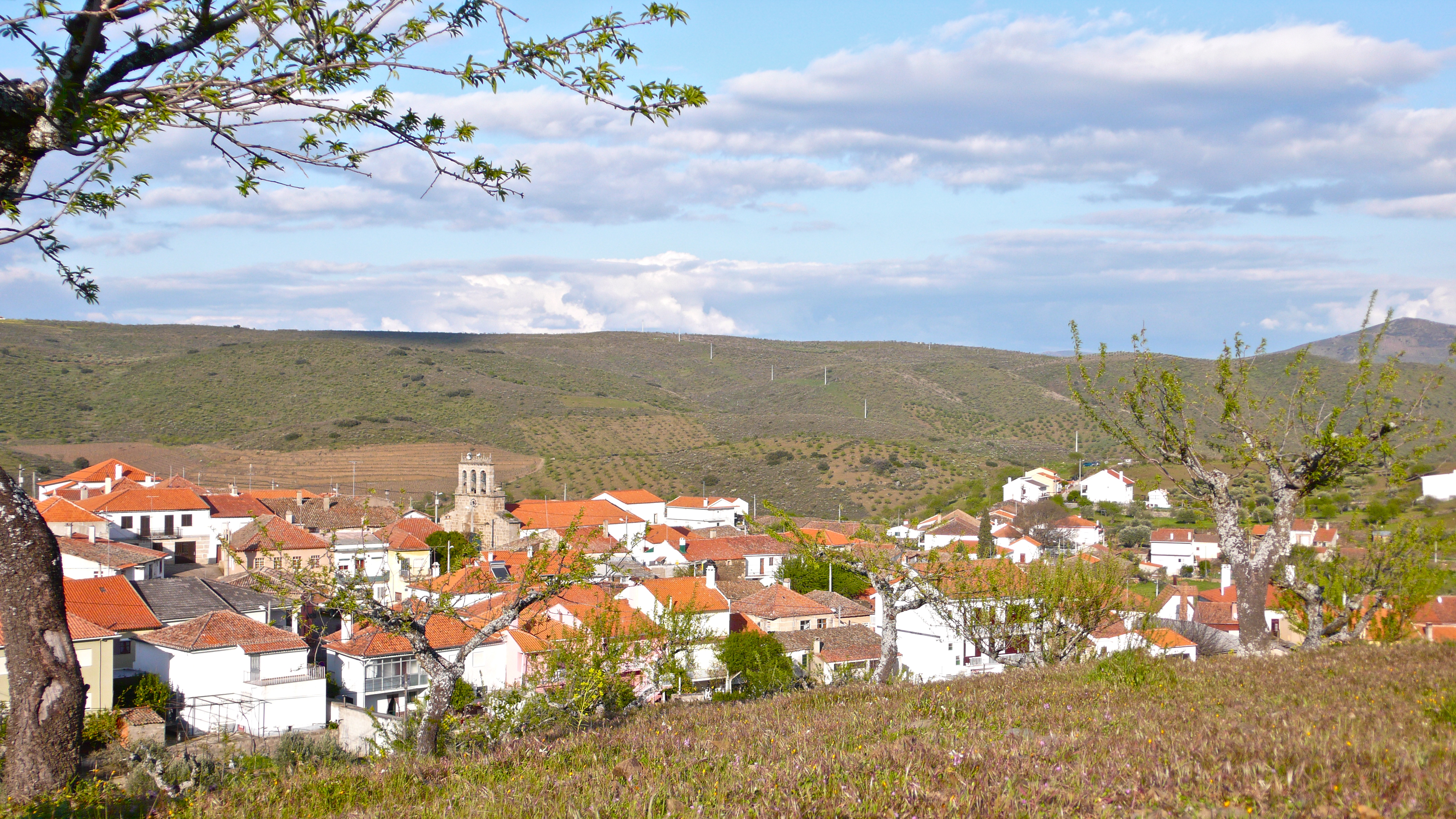

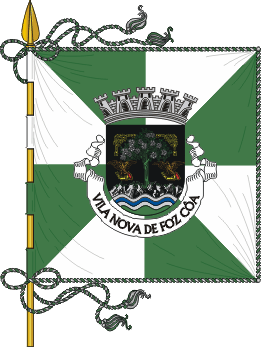
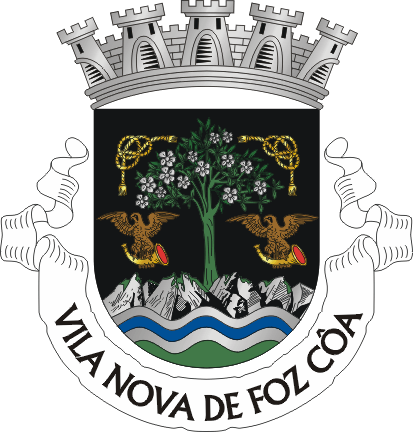
- Flag Coat of arms
- Interactive map of Vila Nova de Foz Côa
- Coordinates: 41.08°N 7.14°W
- Country: Portugal
- Region: Norte
- Intermunic. comm.: Douro
- District: Guarda
- Parishes: 14

Government
  - President: Gustavo Duarte (PSD)

Area
  - Total: 398.2 km^{2} (153.7 sq mi)

Population (2021)
  - Total: 6,304
  - Density: 15.83/km^{2} (41.00/sq mi)
- Time zone: UTC+00:00 (WET)
  - Summer (DST): UTC+01:00 (WEST)

Vila Nova de Foz Côa (European Portuguese pronunciation: [ˈvilɐ ˈnɔvɐ ðɨ ˈfɔʃ ˈkoɐ]) is a city and a municipality at the confluence of the rivers Douro and Côa in the district of Guarda, Portugal. The municipality covers an area of 398.15 square kilometres (153.73 mi^{2}) and it hosted a population of 6,304 people in 2021, while around 3,300 people lived in the city.

The municipality includes part of the Côa Valley Archaeological site, declared by UNESCO as a World Heritage Site and is a part of the Douro wine region.

== History ==
The Côa Valley has yielded significant archaeological findings that trace the origins of its inhabitants to the Paleolithic period, approximately 20,000 years ago. Evidence indicates that early humans inhabited the region, engaging in fishing and hunting for sustenance. They left behind notable rock engravings on the durable schist rock along the valley’s banks. Archaeological sites such as Canada do Inferno, Vale de Figueira, Vale de José Esteves, and Vale Cabrões contain engravings from this period and later, marking a continuous human presence throughout successive generations, including the Mesolithic, Neolithic, Chalcolithic, Bronze, and Iron Ages.

The area also shows substantial evidence of ancient settlement structures, notably at Castelo Velho in nearby Freixo de Numão, where archaeological investigations uncovered remains from a fortified settlement dating back to the Chalcolithic era. This site featured two lines of walls and a central tower, suggesting a small fortified community that may have housed around forty people. After what was likely a period of abandonment, the site was reoccupied in the 2nd millennium BCE, during the Bronze Age, as indicated by the discovery of decorated ceramics and structures made of wood and clay.

During the Iron Age, there was a low population density in the area, due to the challenging climate. Hillforts of the castro culture were situated largely on the plateau and were of a small size. Hillforts have been identified at Espinhaço, Santa Comba, Tapadão, Curral da Pedra and Fumo. Following the Roman conquest of Hispania, this population likely fell under the domain of a center of power in Marialva, Mêda. During this period, the population settled around courses of water and started planting new species such as olives and wine vines. Several findings of roman presence can be found throughout the municipality, in sites such as Quinta de Santa Maria de Ervamoira and Sequeira in the parish of Horta.

Between the 5th and 10th centuries, the territory was under the Kingdom of the Suebi, the Visigothic Kingdom and later the Muslim states of Al-Andalus. During these periods, the occupation of the lands around Foz Côa is believed to be largely nominal, due to a lack of archaeological findings and toponymy associated with these cultures. Furthermore, it is believed that the population in this area was small during this period.

During the reconquista, both the kings of Portugal and Spain made efforts to establish population centers in the border region, culminating in the Treaty of Alcañices in 1297, settling the borders. During this period, the lands that currently form the municipality of Vila Nova de Foz Côa were split. In the 12th century, Freixo de Numão and its castle rose to prominence and a large area surrounding it is given to the castle's lord. In 1299, the town of Foz Côa received its first royal charter (foral) from King Dinis, establishing formal recognition and local governance. This charter delineated the boundaries of Foz Côa, including locations such as Veiga de Santa Maria, Azinhate, and Aldeia Nova. This foral would be renewed by the same king in 1314.

During the reign of King Ferdinand I, on 1 February 1371 the lands of Numão and Foz Côa are donated to Fernando Alfonso de Valencia and On 12 March 1372, Freixo de Numão would be attributed town status. During the end of the 14th century, Foz Côa was briefly under the municipality of Torre de Moncorvo, during the reign of King João I, later regaining its autonomy.

During the modern era, the population of the town of Foz Côa was small. Nonetheless, it had a notable Jewish population which was involved in trade and industry, influencing the local economy, but in 1496 they were expelled or forced to convert. Those who converted were confined to a separate district even after the division between old and new Christians was extinguished. On 16 July 1514, King Manuel I attributed a new foral to Foz Côa and by 1527 its population was 152. The town's population gradually grew to 560 households in 1708, when it was owned by the counts of Portimão, later reverting to the Portuguese crown. During the next 50 years the town stagnated and in 1758 it had only 571 households or 1,413 inhabitants, much smaller than the neighboring and at the time more important municipality of Freixo de Numão, with approximately 3,180 inhabitants.

In the middle of the sixteenth century, the church of the Mós was of the Counts of Marialva, to which belonged the right to appoint the parish priests. Subsequently, a bull of March 14, 1583, allowed the transfer of his possession to the University of Coimbra, leaving their income to revert to the university coffers. It should be recalled that at the time it was common for universities to have their own income, which allowed them to be financially autonomous. The connection to the University is still visible today in numerous epigraphs indicating the limits of university properties.

During the 18th century, the area of the municipality was largely rural, with cereals such as wheat, rye and barley, olive oil and almonds being important goods. Sumac, a commonly used dye at the time, was also grown and exported in Porto. Other goods produced in the area included wine, fruits, vegetables, meat and fish, notably excluding the potato, which had not yet been adopted. The locality's importance as a trade center had declined, not least due to the Jewish expulsion in the 15th century, but may have recovered by the end of the century. The population was largely religious, with several chapels and shrines dotting the landscape.

The first half of the 19th century was period of instability, intolerance and political conflict in the town of Foz Côa. In 1808, following the expulsion of the Napoleonic forces, the town's inhabitants would accuse the families descendant from new Christians involved in business and trade of conspiring with the occupiers. Over twenty houses were raided and sacked, and several families fled to the neighboring Torre de Moncorvo. Then from the 1820s, during the Liberal Wars, political persecution first again liberalists and later the miguelists. During the following years, conflict again emerged due to political discussions on Setembrism and Cartism, leading to aggression, murder and house fires. Between the end of the 18th century and 1826, 150 families left the town, a number that likely increased until the second half of the 19th century. Its population would only recover back to 3,500 inhabitants by the end of the century. This population trend was similar in Freixo de Numão, although other localities in the modern municipality of Vila Nova de Foz Côa would see their population grow.

Also during the 19th century, the municipality of Vila Nova de Foz Côa would gradually expand, reaching its current size by 1872. It integrated the lands of the municipalities of Muxagata in 1836, Freixo de Numão in 1853 and Almendra and Marialva in 1855, losing the parish of Marialva to Mêda in 1872.

The wine production in the municipality for export would begin in the end of the 18th century, but would only ramp up during the second half of the 19th century. By 1887, the Douro railway line would reach Foz Côa and the Spanish border, which would further support wine production and its transport. The most important wine producing estate was of Vale Meão with 600 hectares, headed by Antónia Ferreira. The planting of this estate started 1887 and ended in 1896, and it was a labor intensive job, employing at one point more than 1,000 workers.

Between the end of the 19th century and 1920, the municipality's population stagnated. Migration towards Porto or Brazil increased, while after World War I epidemics limited population growth. The city resumed growing until the 1950s, but then migration to the Portuguese colonies or abroad to Europe intensified, leading to a population decline. After the fall of the Portuguese dictatorship in the 1970s, some return to Foz Côa, but this is not enough to stop the municipality's population decline over the following decades.

On July 12, 1997, Vila Nova de Foz Côa became a city.

== Parishes ==
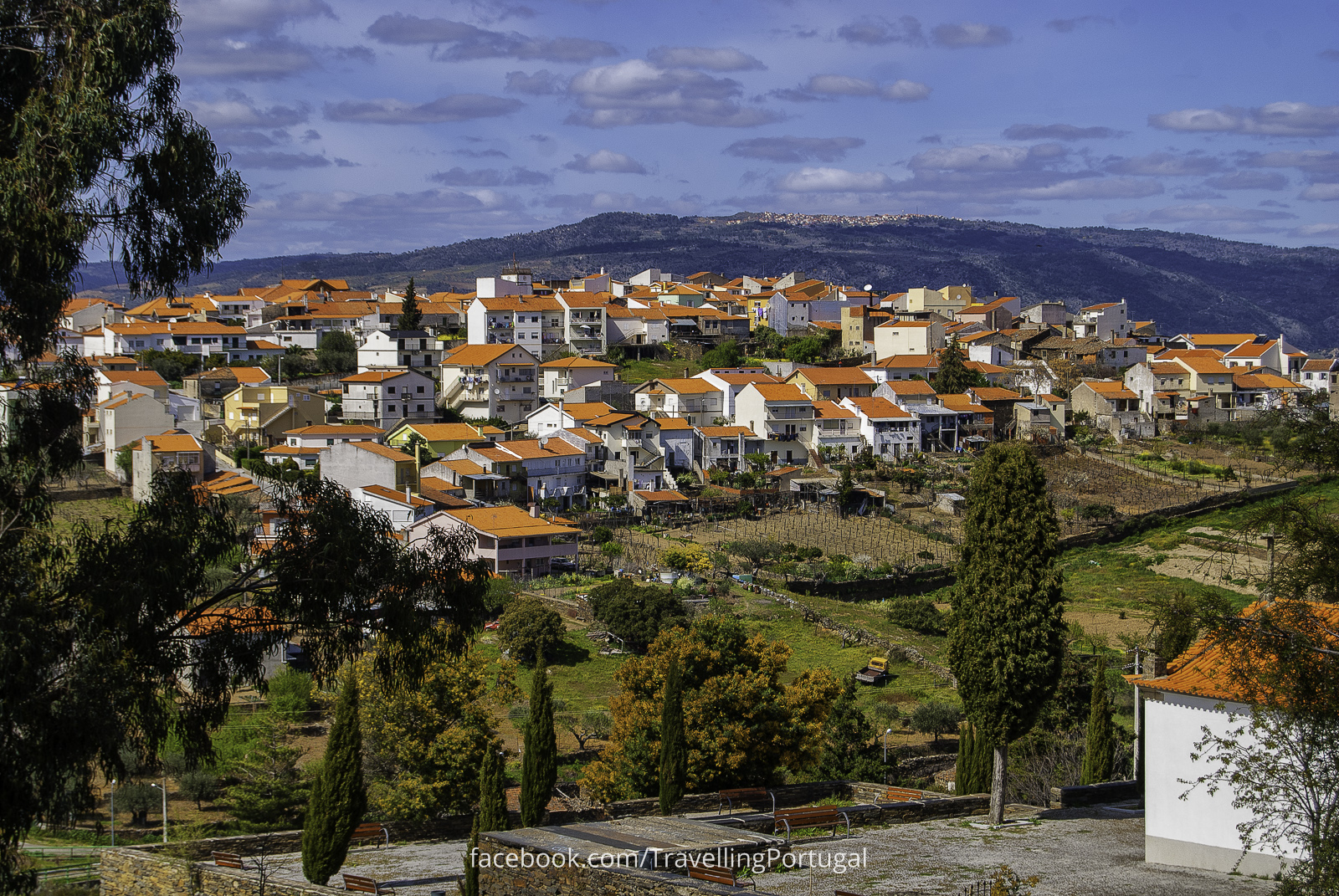
Vila Nova de Foz Côa

Administratively, the municipality is divided into 14 civil parishes (freguesias):

- Almendra
- Castelo Melhor
- Cedovim
- Chãs
- Custóias
- Freixo de Numão
- Horta
- Muxagata
- Numão
- Santa Comba
- Sebadelhe
- Seixas
- Touça
- Vila Nova de Foz Côa

== Demographics ==
| Demographic evolution | | | | | | | | | | | | | | | |
|---|---|---|---|---|---|---|---|---|---|---|---|---|---|---|---|
| 1864 | 1878 | 1890 | 1900 | 1911 | 1920 | 1930 | 1940 | 1950 | 1960 | 1970 | 1981 | 1991 | 2001 | 2011 | 2021 |
| 11,613 | 12,159 | 13,051 | 13,939 | 14,355 | 13,254 | 14,404 | 16,252 | 17,116 | 16,209 | 10,061 | 11,251 | 8,885 | 8,494 | 7,312 | 6,304 |

| Demographic evolution by age group | | | | | | | | | | | | | |
|---|---|---|---|---|---|---|---|---|---|---|---|---|---|
| | 1900 | 1911 | 1920 | 1930 | 1940 | 1950 | 1960 | 1970 | 1981 | 1991 | 2001 | 2011 | 2021 |
| 0–14 years old | 5,001 | 5,270 | 4,596 | 4,751 | 5,479 | 5,469 | 4,861 | 2,315 | 2,576 | 1,509 | 1,067 | 792 | 555 |
| 15–24 years old | 2,536 | 2,505 | 2,421 | 2,841 | 2,782 | 2,974 | 2,659 | 1,325 | 1,800 | 1,205 | 1,029 | 676 | 502 |
| 25–64 years old | 5,744 | 5,959 | 5,477 | 6,039 | 6,959 | 7,312 | 7,279 | 4,100 | 4,812 | 4,115 | 4,085 | 3,568 | 2,986 |
| = or > 65 years old | 598 | 753 | 669 | 815 | 1,021 | 1,214 | 1,410 | 1,635 | 2,063 | 2,056 | 2,313 | 2,276 | 2,261 |
| > Unknown age | 43 | 17 | 73 | 22 | 36 | | | | | | | | |

== Economy ==
The economy of Vila Nova de Foz Côa is deeply rooted in agriculture. The municipality is located in the Douro DOC region and its cooperatives and vineyards grow grapes used in the production of Douro and Port wines. Almonds once played a significant role in the local economy as the municipality hosts Portugal's largest concentration of almond trees. However, this importance has diminished in recent years due to competition from Californian almond imports. Other relevant agricultural goods include olives and olive oil, game, fish and a variety of fruits which thrive in the Mediterranean-like climate such as peaches, figs, melons, oranges, and grapes, olives and olive oil.

Tourism also plays a role in the local economy, both due to the Côa Valley Archaeological site and the region's gastronomy and wine production. Furthermore, every winter, the municipality hosts a festival during the almond blossom season, attracting national and international tourists.

== Culture ==
The gastronomy of Vila Nova de Foz Côa reflects its agricultural surroundings. Local dishes feature fish from the Douro River and its tributaries and a variety of meats, including pork, goat, lamb, and game such as rabbit, hare, and partridge. Foz Côa’s culinary identity uses distinct regional herbs and vegetables, such as asparagus, chestnuts (pilongas), sorrel, chard, nettles, and fennel. These dishes are often accompanied by local bread made from wheat or rye, as well as regional cheese, chouriço, and olives. The area is also known for its sweet treats, particularly those made with almonds, such as "súplicas," and "lampreias de ovos."

== Landmarks ==
In the municipality there are three national monuments: The castle of Numão, the Pillory of Vila Nova de Foz Côa, and the Mother Church (Igreja Matriz) of Vila Nova de Foz Côa, with a Manueline façade. Another important monument in the municipality is the schist castle of Castelo Melhor, of Leonese construction dating back to the early 13th century.

== Transportation ==
The Douro railway line passes through the north of the municipality, servicing three locations, Vesúvio, Freixo de Numão and Pocinho. The later station is located 6 kilometres (3.7 mi) north of the city of Foz Côa and it is the current eastern terminus of the railway line. From Pocinho, Comboios de Portugal runs regional services eight times a day to Porto, via Peso da Régua, Marco de Canaveses, Penafiel, Paredes and Ermesinde.

The municipality is connected to Portugal's highway network by the principal route IP2, running north towards Bragança and south towards Guarda. A national road N222 connects the municipality to Peso da Régua in the west and to Vilar Formoso and Spain to the east.

In Pocinho, in the southern bank of the river Douro, there is a small pier that can host up to 27 small boats and a berth that can receive larger ships of up to 300 deadweight tonnes, such as river cruises.

== Notable people ==
- Francisco António de Campos (1780–1873), first baron of Vila Nova de Foz Côa
- Ricardo Chéu (born 1981), football manager
- Joaquim José de Campos Abreu e Lemos, miguelist
- António Joaquim Marçal, supporter of Costa Cabral
- Ricardo Meneses (1982-2010), actor
- José Joaquim Ferreira de Moura (1776–1829), magistrate with a vintism alignment
- João Pimenta (born 1985), football player
- Francisco Maria da Veiga (1852–1934), judge
