= Fumo =

Fumo may refer to:

== People ==
- Fumo (surname)
- Fumo Liyongo, Swahili writer and chieftain
- Fumo Madi ibn Abi Bakr (1779–1809), Sultan of Pate

== See also ==
- FUMO, a mobile phone standard
- FuMO 21 radar
- FuMO 24 radar
- FumoFumo (Japanese: ふもふも; colloquially "fumo"), a brand line plush figures of the characters of the Touhou Project series
- Ponte do Fumo, a bridge in Portugal
