= Penela (disambiguation) =

Penela is a town and a municipality in Portugal. It may also refer to the following places in Portugal:

- Penela Castle, a medieval castle
- Pai Penela, a civil parish in the Mêda Municipality
- Penela da Beira, a civil parish in the Penedono Municipality
- Póvoa de Penela, a civil parish in the Penedono Municipality

== See also ==
- Pinela, a civil parish in the municipality of Bragança
