= Ponte do Fumo =

Bridge of Fumo Ponte do Fumo
- Coordinates: 41°5′24″N 7°30′51″W
- Carries: pedestrian
- Crosses: Távora River
- Locale: Távora e Pereiro, Tabuaço, Portugal
- Official name: Ponte do Fumo
- Heritage status: heritage without legal protection

The Bridge of Fumo (Portuguese: Ponte do Fumo) is an old medieval bridge, probably built around the year 1040, as mentioned in the charter of Fernando Magno to the village of Paredes da Beira, the bridge appears referred to: in Tavara ad ponte de Fumo. It is located between Távora e Pereiro and Tabuaço, on the Távora River, shortly before the confluence with the Quintã stream, and close to Quintas da Aveleira and the Convent of São Pedro das Águias.

== See also ==
- List of bridges in Portugal
