= Penela da Beira =

- Civil parish
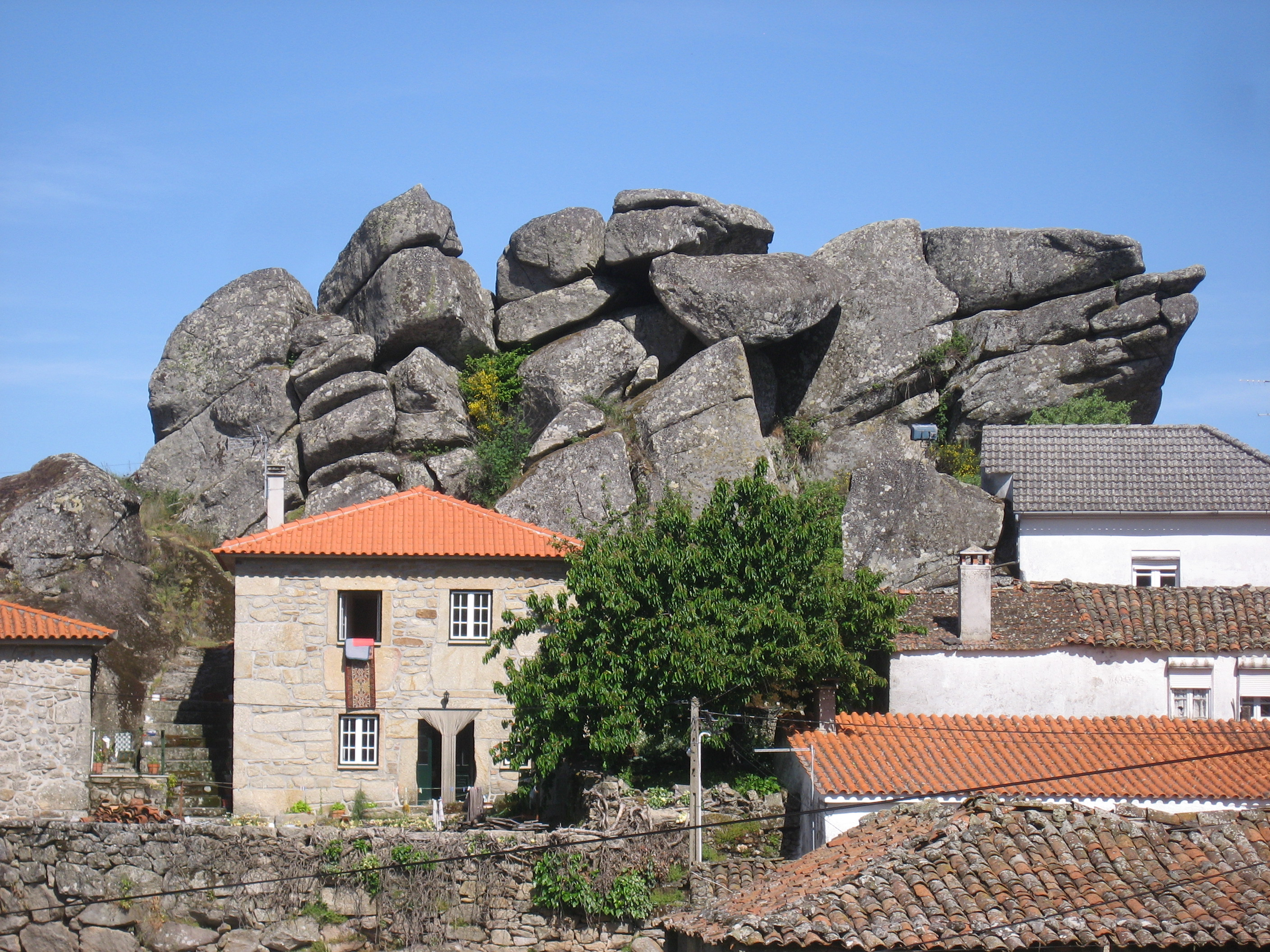
- Granite outcrop among village houses, Penela da Beira

- Location in Portugal
- Coordinates: 41.0306°N 7.4208°W
- Country: Portugal
- Region: Norte
- Intermunic. comm.: Douro
- District: Viseu
- Municipality: Penedono

Area
  - Total: 15.96 km^{2} (6.16 sq mi)

Population (2011)
  - Total: 353
  - Density: 22.1/km^{2} (57.3/sq mi)
- Time zone: UTC+00:00 (WET)
  - Summer (DST): UTC+01:00 (WEST)
- Postal code: 5130-421
- Website: https://www.jf-peneladabeira.pt/

Penela da Beira is a village and a civil parish (freguesia) within the Portuguese municipality of Penedono, in the district of Viseu. It has an area of 15.96 km^{2} and had 353 inhabitants at the 2011 census (with a) population density of 22.1/km^{2}.

The parish received the first foral (Royal charter) awarded to a Portuguese territory by Ferdinand I of León (Ferdinand the Great) in 1055 (or 1065). This charter was later confirmed by the Portuguese kings Alfonso I (Dom Afonso Henriques), Sancho I, and Alfonso II.

Penela da Beira was the seat of a municipal council until 1834, when it was integrated into the municipality of Trevões, within which it remained until this was suppressed as a municipality in 1855, after which Panela da Beira passed to the municipality of Penedono. Subsequently, it was placed under the council of São João da Pesqueira, before being finally returned to Penedono in 1898.

A striking feature of the village is a massive granite outcrop in its centre, surrounded by houses, but rising above them.
