= Fumo (surname) =

Fumo is a surname. Notable people with the surname include:

- Bartolommeo Fumo (died 1545), Italian Dominican theologian
- Carlos Fumo (born 1979), Mozambican footballer
- Nicola Fumo (1647–1725), Italian sculptor and architect
- Ozzie Fumo (born 1965), American politician
- Vince Fumo (born 1943), American politician, lawyer and businessman

== See also ==
- Fumo (disambiguation)
