= Ervedosa =

Ervedosa may refer to the following places in Portugal:

- Ervedosa (Pinhel), a civil parish in the Pinhel Municipality
- Ervedosa (Vinhais), a civil parish in the municipality of Vinhais
- Ervedosa do Douro, a civil parish in the municipality of São João da Pesqueira
