= Vilar Dam =

Great Vilar Dam
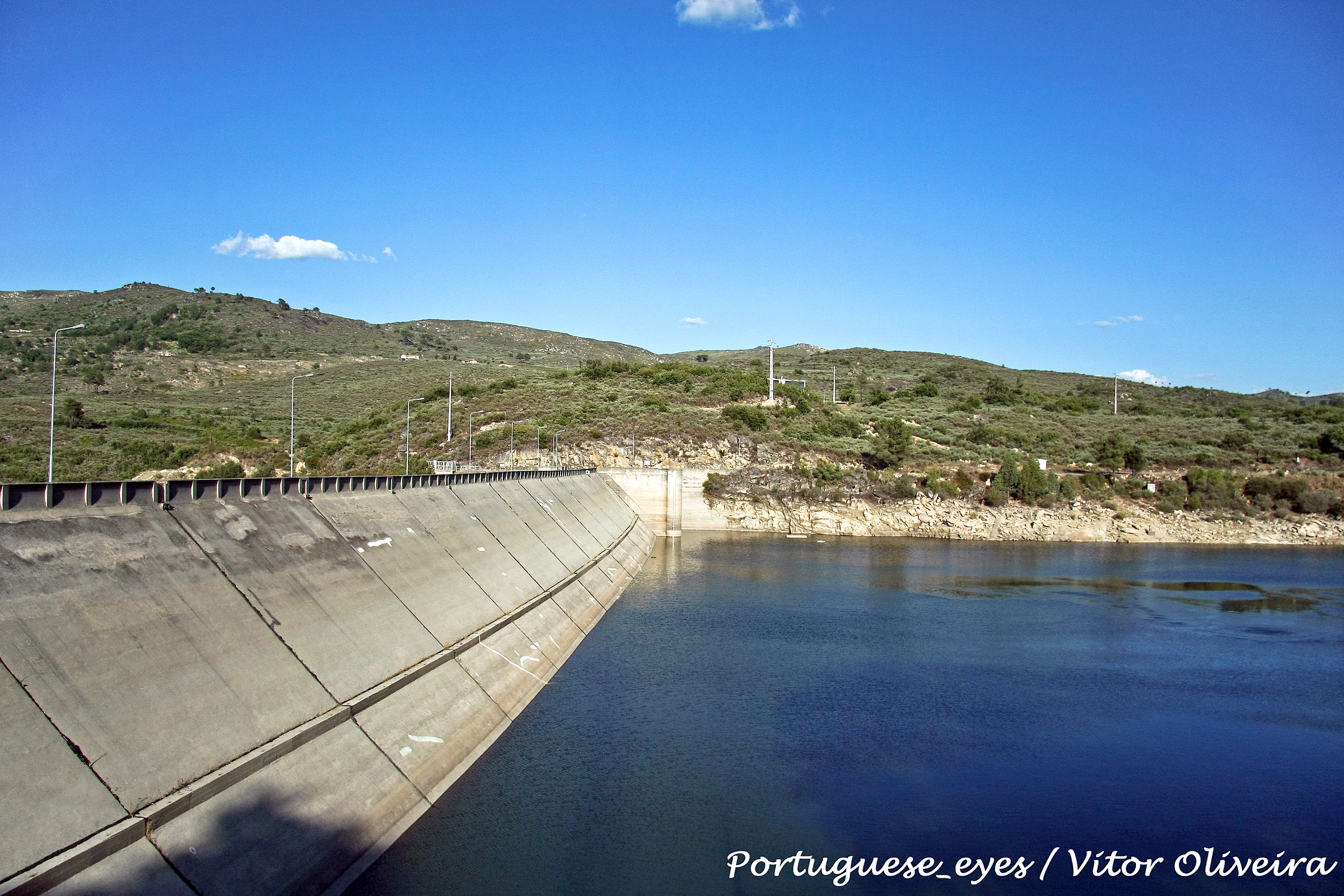

- Location within Portugal
- Official name: Barragem de Vilar
- Country: Portugal
- Location: municipality Tabuaço, Viseu District
- Coordinates: 40°59′12.5″N 7°32′7.9″W
- Purpose: Power
- Status: Operational
- Construction began: 1958
- Opening date: 1965
- Owner: Companhia Portuguesa de Produção de Electricidade
- Operator: Energias de Portugal

Dam and spillways
- Type of dam: Rockfill embankment dam
- Impounds: Távora
- Height (foundation): 58 m (190 ft)
- Height (thalweg): 55 m (180 ft)
- Length: 240 m (790 ft)
- Elevation at crest: 555 m (1,821 ft)
- Width (crest): 5.2 m (17 ft)
- Dam volume: 300,000 m^{3} (11,000,000 cu ft)
- Spillway type: Chute spillway
- Spillway capacity: 500 m^{3}/s (18,000 cu ft/s)

Reservoir
- Total capacity: 99,750,000 m^{3} (80,870 acre⋅ft)
- Active capacity: 95,270,000 m^{3} (77,240 acre⋅ft)
- Surface area: 6.7 km^{2} (2.6 mi^{2})
- Normal elevation: 552 m (1,811 ft)

Power Station
- Operator: Energias de Portugal
- Commission date: 1965
- Hydraulic head: 461 m (1,512 ft) (max)
- Turbines: 2 x 32.65 MW Pelton-type
- Installed capacity: 58 MW
- Annual generation: 137.6 GWh

Vilar Dam (Portuguese: Barragem de Vilar, also known as Barragem de Vilar-Tabuaço) is an embankment dam on the Távora, a left (southern) tributary of the Douro. It is located in the municipality Tabuaço, in Viseu District, Portugal.

Construction of the dam began in 1958 and was completed in 1965. It is owned by Companhia Portuguesa de Produção de Electricidade (CPPE) and is used for power generation.

== Dam ==
Vilar Dam is a 58 m tall (height above foundation) and 240 m long rockfill embankment dam with a crest altitude of 555 m. The upstream facing of the dam is made of concrete. The volume of the dam is 300,000 m³. The chute spillway with 2 radial gates is located at the right side of the dam. The maximum discharge is 500 m³/s. There is also a bottom outlet.

== Reservoir ==
At full reservoir level of 552 m the reservoir of the dam has a surface area of 6.7km² and a total capacity of 99.75 mio. m³. The active capacity is 95.27 (95.3 or 96) mio. m³. With the 95.3 mio. m³ of water 115.6 GWh can be produced.

== Power plant ==
The hydroelectric power plant was commissioned in 1965. It is operated by EDP. The plant has a nameplate capacity of 58 (64) MW. Its average annual generation is 137.6 (123 or 148) GWh.

The power station contains 2 Pelton turbine-generators (vertical shaft) with 32.65 MW (40 MVA) in an underground powerhouse 350 m below the surface, located 15.6 km from the dam. The turbine rotation is 500 rpm. The minimum hydraulic head is 432.5 m, and the maximum 461 m. Maximum flow per turbine is 9 m³/s.

== See also ==
- List of power stations in Portugal
- List of dams and reservoirs in Portugal
