= Castle of Numão =

Castle in Vila Nova de Foz Côa, Guarda, Portugal

- Castelo de Numão
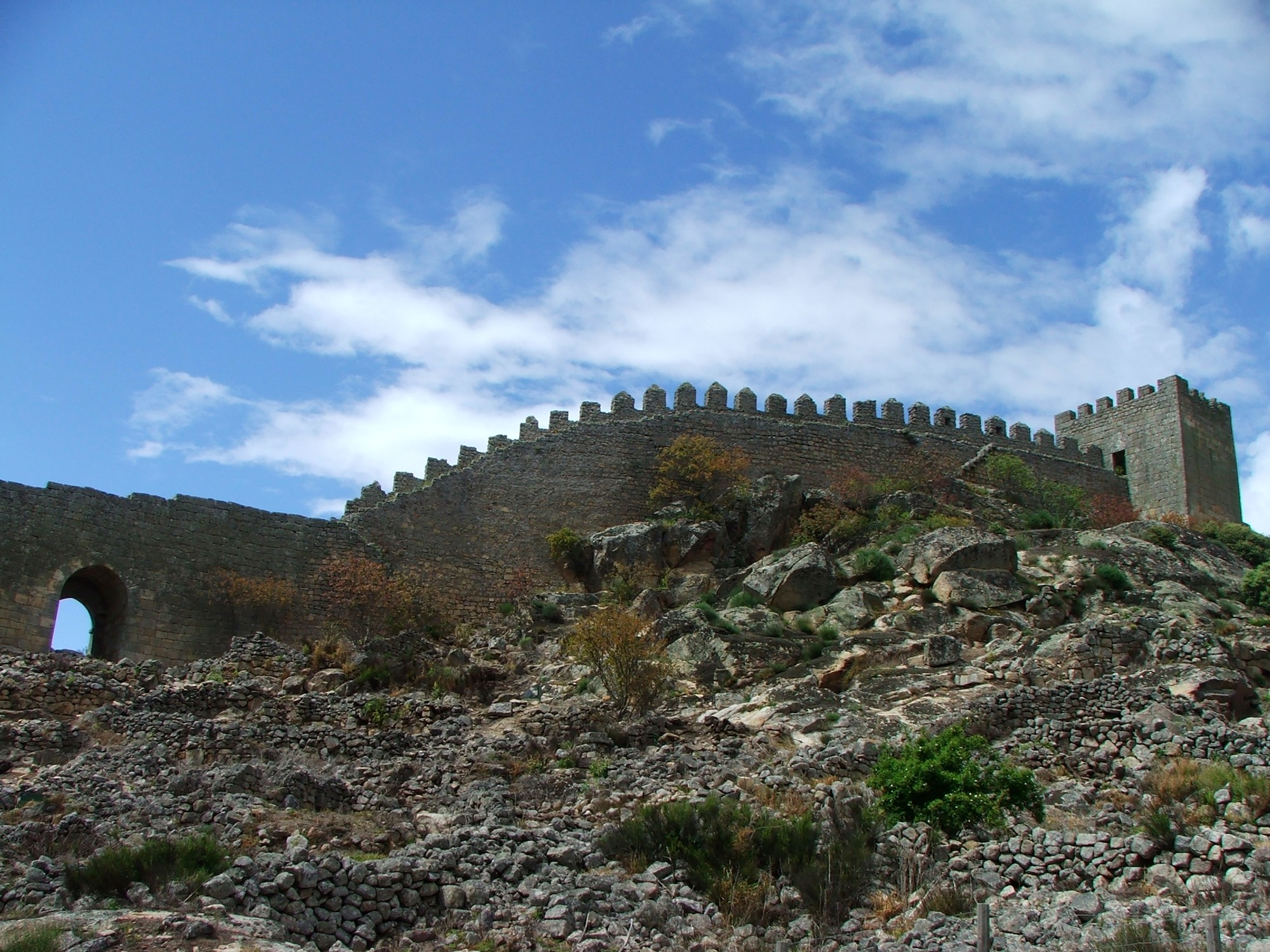

General information
- Coordinates: 41°06.033′N 7°17.464′W

Height
- Architectural: Gothic

The Castle of Numão (Portuguese: Castelo de Numão) is a medieval castle in the civil parish of Numão, municipality of Vila Nova de Foz Côa, in the Portuguese district of Guarda.

== History ==
=== Early history ===
The earliest evidence of human settlement dates to prehistoric times, as far back as the Neolithic period. It is believed that the Lusitanians lived here and later became subjects to the Roman Empire With the Muslim invasion of the Iberian Peninsula, a fort saw its construction there.

=== Medieval era ===
During the context of the Christian Reconquest of the region, the fortress and a few others in the regions belonged to a man named Chamoa Rodriguez. At the time of the Christian Reconquest, here existed a castle, which together with others in the eastern border region, belonged to D. Chamoa Rodrigues, who donated, through his aunt, the Countess Mumadona Dias, the Monastery of Guimarães (960 ).

Retaken by Muslim forces in 1000, the village was later devastated by the brothers Tedom and Rausendo Ramires in 1030, only to be reconquered by Fernando Magno in 1055 or 1056. In this period, the castle is among the inventoried property belonging to the Monastery of Guimarães in 1059.

With the independence of Portugal, Afonso I of Portugal (1112-1185) donated his dominions to his brother, Ferdinand Mendes de Bragança. The noble, on 8 July 1130, granted a charter to the town (referred to as Civitate Noman) and promoted the rebuilding of the castle.

Later, under the reign of Afonso's son and successor, Sancho I (1185-1211), massive works of recovery of the walls and the erection of the main tower were completed as epigraphic inscription (now lost) dated 1189.

Under the reign of King Sancho II (1223-1248), the areas of Numão and its castle were donated temporarily to April Peres Lumiares.

In October 1265, Afonso III (1248-1279) confirmed the charter to the village. A new constructive phase in their defenses, however, will only have taken place from the confirmation of this title by King Dinis (1279-1325), on 27 October 1285.

When the 1383-85 Portuguese succession crisis, Numão sided by Beatriz, along with the neighboring villages and castles of Penedono, Pinhel, Sabugal, Castelo Rodrigo and Trancoso.

Under the short reign of D. Duarte (1433-1438) was established here one of couto homiziados (1436), which seems to indicate some difficulty with its settlement. The village received Foral New King Manuel I (1495-1521) on 25 August 1512. At the time it was Commendation of the Order of Christ. The Register of Population of the Kingdom in 1527, shows that Numão village had 15 fires, and 41 more in their surroundings.

With the extinction of family Coutinhos for lack of descendants (1534), the town and its castle had their aggravated decay process: two centuries later the village was changed-to a new location at the foot of the hill. Frei Joaquim de Santa Rosa de Viterbo refers, in 1798–1799, the castle was practically ruined and that the door "which is to the West" was in one epigraphic inscription, who transcribed: "Incepit Tvrrem in was MCCXXVII" (corresponding to 1189 in our calendar).

The Institute for the Management of Architectural and Archaeological Heritage classified it as a National Monument by decree published on June 23, 1910.

The government intervened in the second half of the 1940s by proceeding with works of consolidation and cleaning, rebuilding walls, desentulhamento the tank and recovery the donjon. New works campaigns took place in 1973–1974, due to the collapse of a section north of the walls, and in 1984.

In the early twenty-first century, the municipality did install stage lighting.

== Architecture ==
The castle is a typical mountain castle, standing on a rocky hill 677 meter above sea level. It presents irregular oval plant (organic), with elements of Romanesque and Gothic styles, occupying an area of 336 hectares. The walls, crenellated in a short stretch, are reinforced by towers (originally fifteen, currently six), some of which addorsed the outside. Tear them four ports:

Port of San Pedro in the east, garrisoned by a tower, has pointed arch, with coverage in slightly pointed barrel vault;

the West Gate to the west, a similar figure;

- False Door (postern) the Southeast, in broken bow; and
- the main port in the south, opening only to the imposed the arc starter.

At the center of the main square opens up a circular plan tank with about seven meters in diameter without coverage. Next to the main door observe the ruins of the Church of Santa Maria do Castelo (Romanesque) and the cemetery.

The Watchtower, the Northeast, has square plan, with walls torn by two high slits and surmounted by corbels of geometric decoration.

On the slope east, near the gate of St. Peter and where there was a homonymous chapel, there is a necropolis with about 10 anthropomorphic graves dug into the rock, popularly known as Cemetery of the Moors.
