= GR 14 (Portugal) =

Footpath from Portugal

GR14 Rota dos Vinhos da Europa
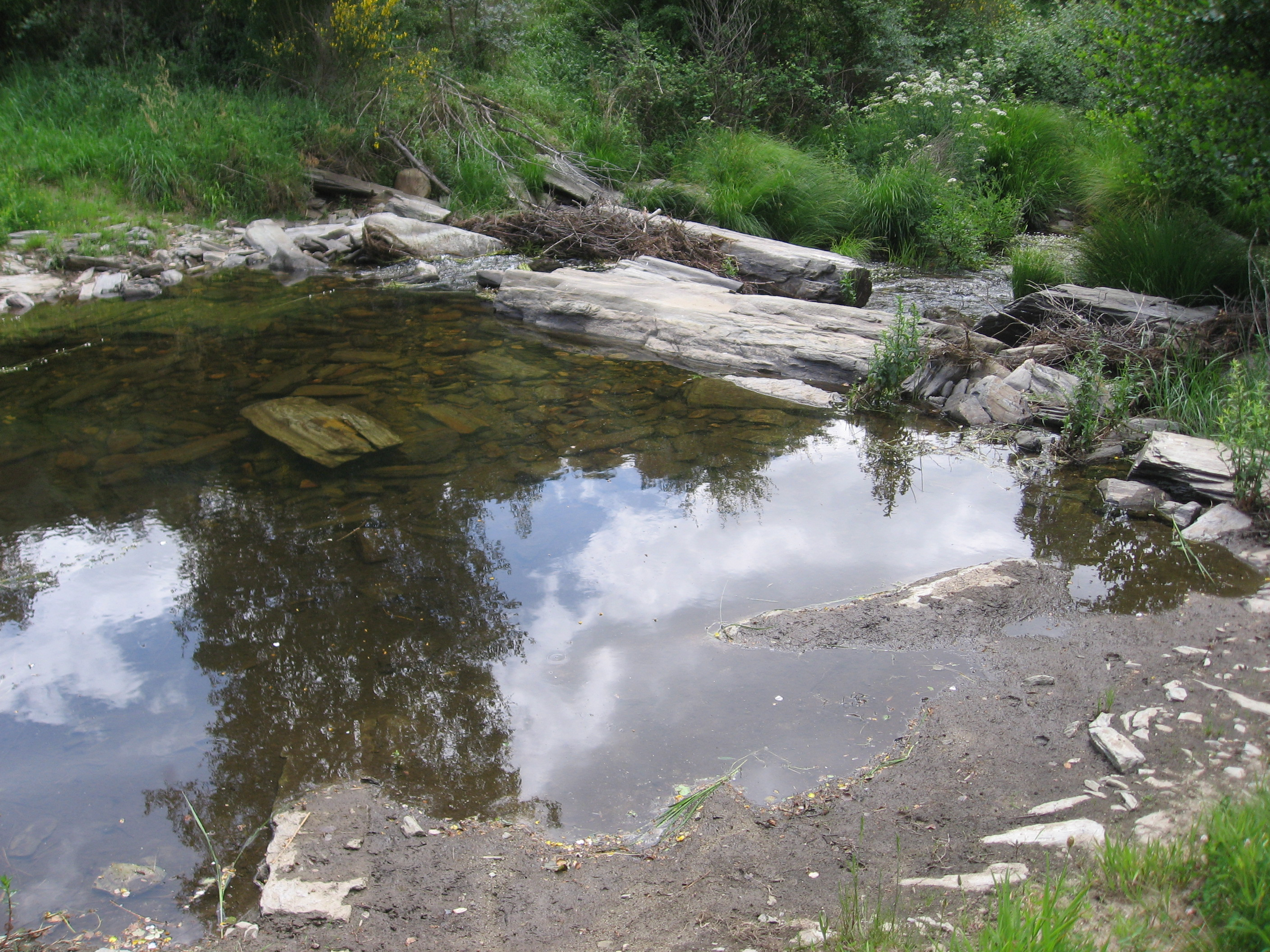
- Stepping stones over the Rio Torto between São João da Pesqueira and Trevões on the GR14 footpath
- Location: Portugal, Spain, France
- Designation: GR footpath, European walking route
- Trailheads: Porto, Strasbourg
- Use: Hiking

The GR 14 is a Percurso pedestre de grande rota (long-distance footpath with standard waymarking) in Portugal, which connects with a corresponding path into Spain. In Portugal, it is known as the Rota dos Vinhos da Europa (European Wine Route), and Portuguese tourist maps mark it as continuing through wine-growing areas of Spain and France to terminate at Strasbourg. As of 2015 it is not included in the list of "E-paths" (international routes) published by the European Ramblers' Association; however, a long-distance route of the same number (GR 14 (Spain), known as the Senda del Duero does continue the route into Spain from the border at Salto de Saucelle

In Portugal, the route is designated from the Atlantic coast at Vila Nova de Gaia in Porto eastward to the Spanish border. Generally the path follows the course of the Douro river, though remaining slightly to the south of the river and at substantially greater altitudes, rising to almost 900m as against the approximately 150m of the upper Douro valley. The extent to which the path is waymarked along the whole of its length is not clear. As of 2013, only the section in the municipality of Armamar is included in the list of GR footpaths in Portugal in the National Register of Walking Routes published by the body responsible for these, the Federação de Campismo e Montanhismo de Portugal, but there is evidence that it is also waymarked at least in the municipalities of Tabuaço, São João da Pesqueira (45 km) and Vila Nova de Foz Côa at the eastern end of the route. In those areas, the route follows well used tracks or quiet country roads, between small towns and villages where accommodation and food are readily available. River crossings on footpath sections are either by bridges (e.g. across the River Távora), or stepping stones (e.g. across the River Torto). In accordance with the name of the route, it frequently passes through vineyards. It descends to the Douro at Ferradosa in the São João da Pesqueira section.
