= Castle of Penedono =

Medieval castle in Penedono, Viseu, Portugal

- Castelo de Penedono
- Viseu, Douro, Norte Region, Portugal in Portugal
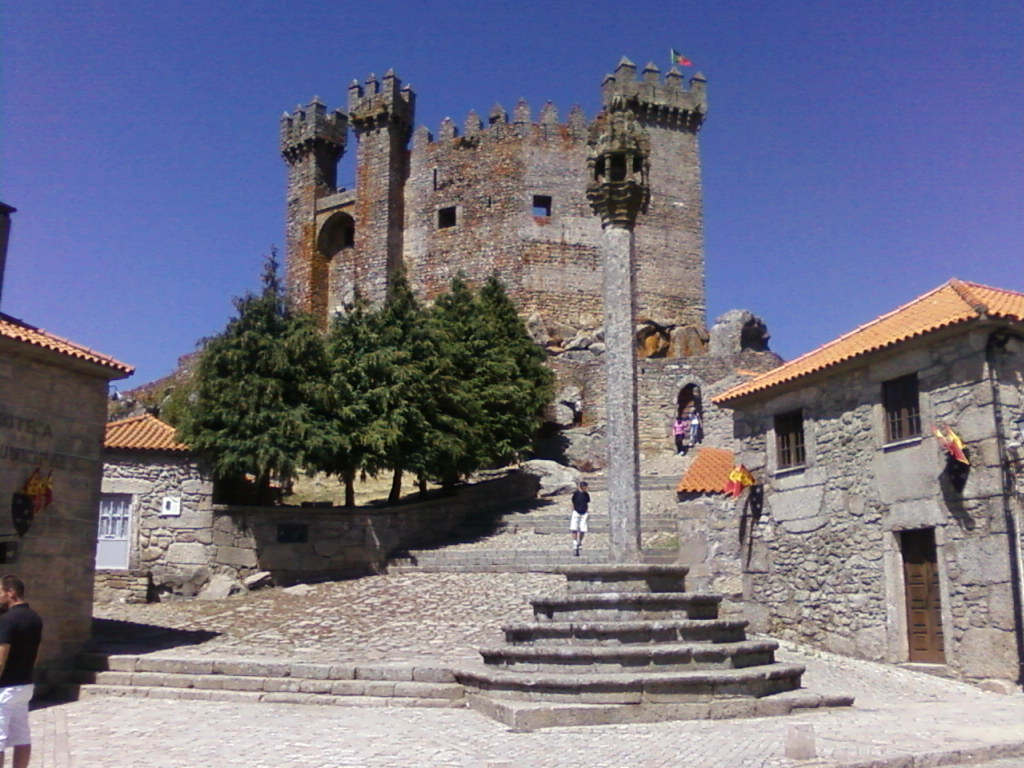
- The Castle of Penedono and pillory, as seen from the lower portion of the medieval town

Site information
- Type: Castle
- Owner: Portuguese Republic
- Operator: Câmara Municipal de Penedono (ceded on 21 October 1941)
- Open to the public: Public

Location
- Coordinates: 40.98998°N 7.39375°W

Site history
- Materials: Granite, Tile, Iron

The Castle of Penedono (Portuguese: Castelo de Penedono) is a medieval castle located in the civil parish of Penedono e Granja, in the municipality of Penedono, Portuguese district of Viseu.

== History ==
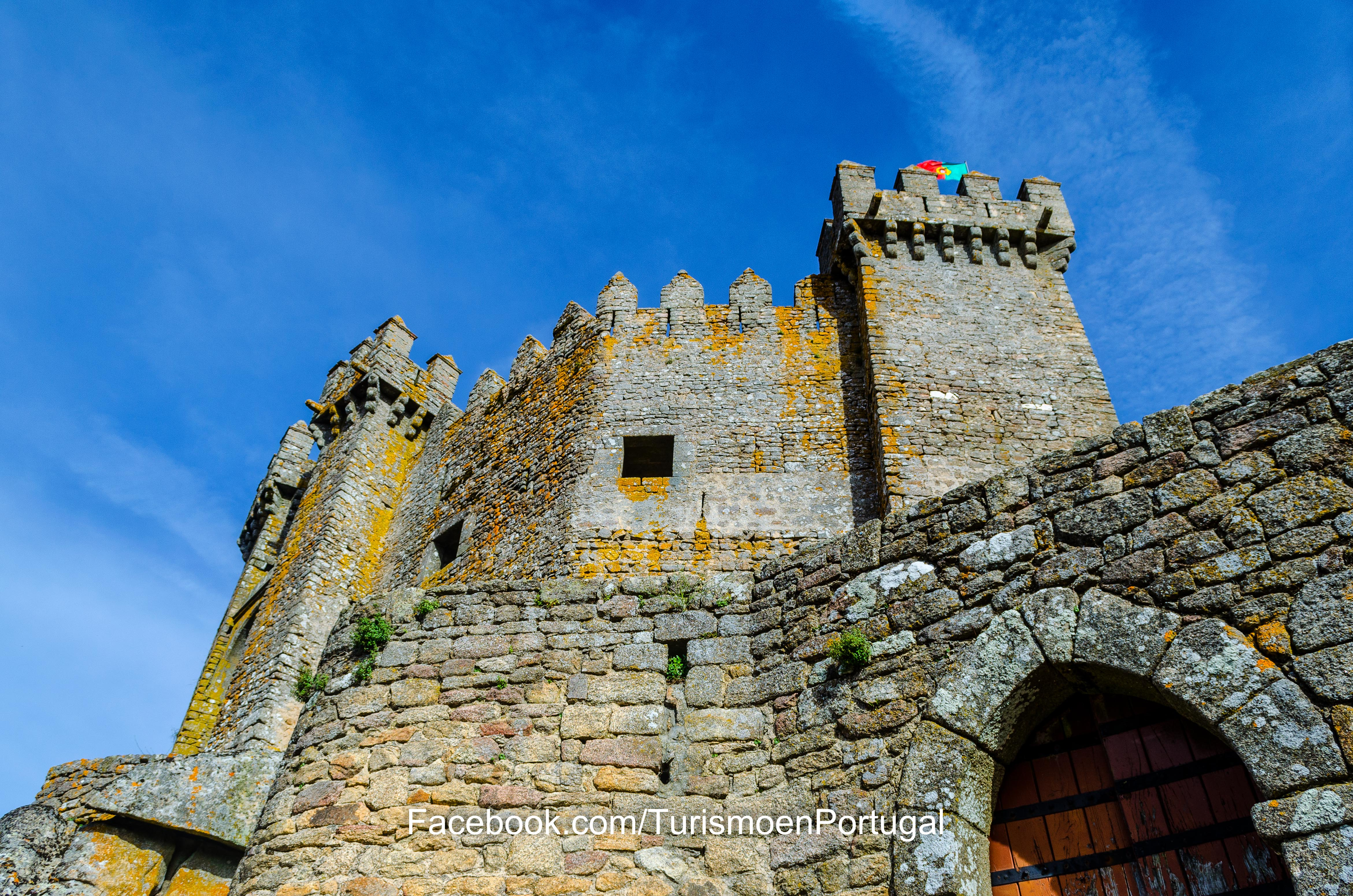
The imposing walls and towers of the castle

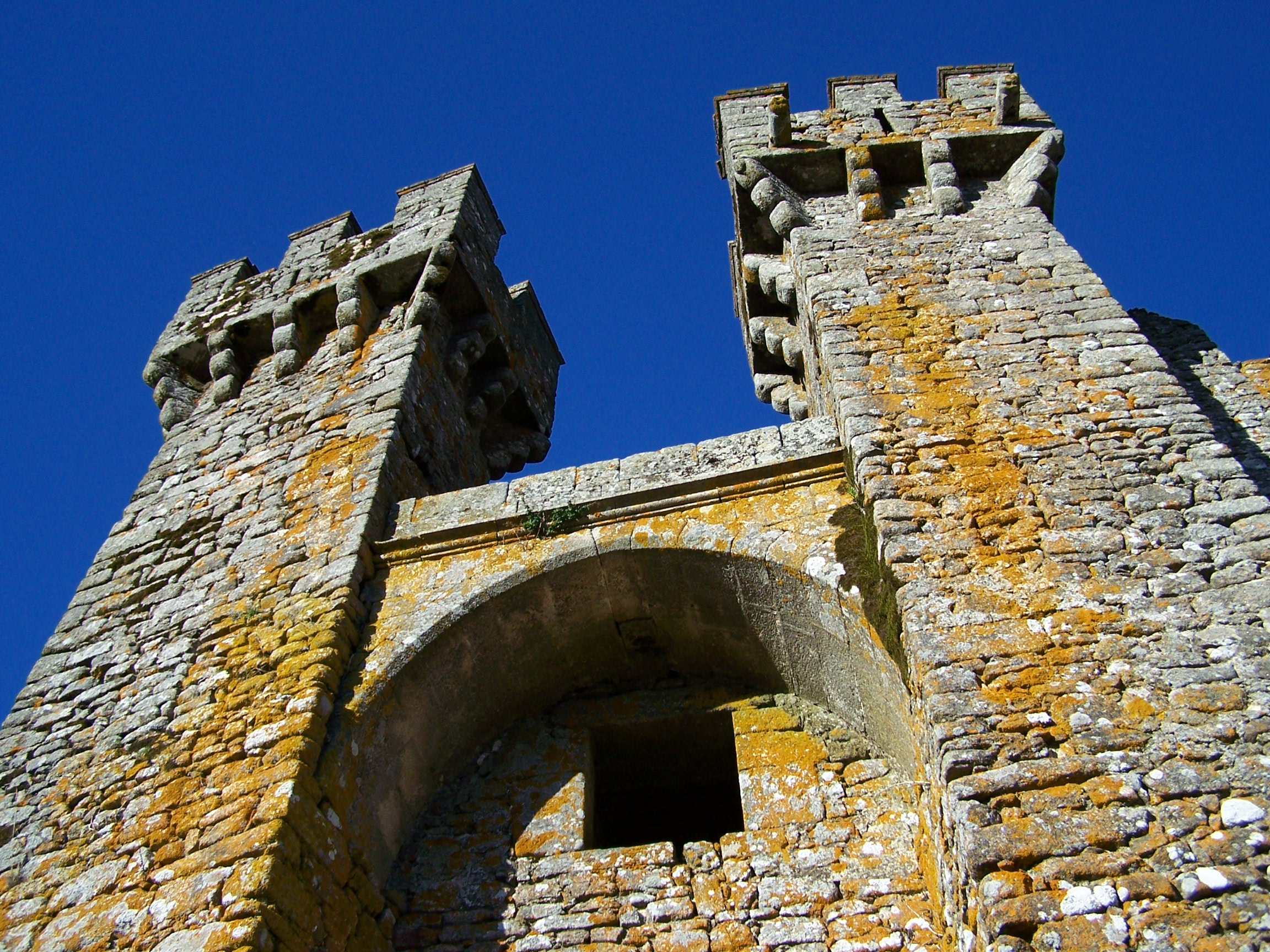
The flanking towers of the southwest entrance to the castle

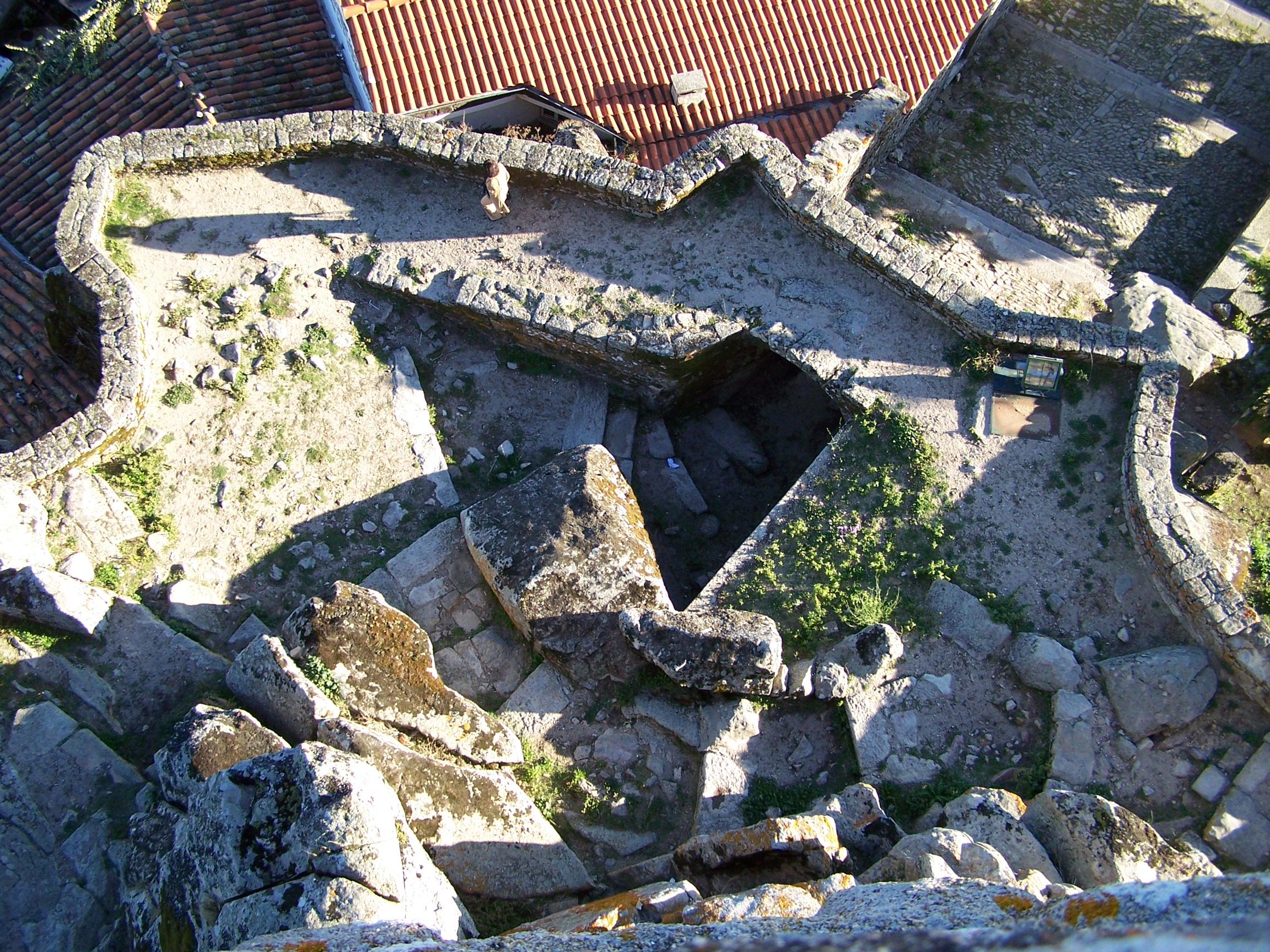
The hummocky and rocky interior courtyard

The castle of Penedono was one fortresses referred in the donation of D. Flâmula (or Chamôa Rodrigues) to the Monastery of Guimarães (on 11 June 960); it was mentioned part of the properties inherited from her mother, D. Leodegúndia Dias, the daughter of Count Diogo Fernandes and his wife D. Oreca. At the time of testament, the document had recommended the sale of the structure, in order for its monies to be used to help pay the ransom of captives, support pilgrims and assist monasteries. The donation had the effect of securing an important strategic point and organizational linchpin of the Beira Alta Interior region. Nothing is recorded of the original configuration of the redoubt.

The oldest documented records date from the early Christian Reconquest of the area from the Moors; there is a reference to the area being repopulated after the victory of Ramiro II of León over the Moorish forces at the Battle of Simancas, in 939 AD. Penedono remained a border castle for several years, but in 987, it was reconquered by armies of Almanzor. The castle was retaken from the Moors by forces loyal to Ferdinand I of León between 1055 and 1057. The defense of the territory was then entrusted to Rodrigo Tedoniz, who set about the reconstruction of the castle. By 1059, though, it was already in the possession of the Monastery of São Salvador de Guimarães.

In 1195, in order to improve the strategic position of the border territory, King D. Sancho I conceded the region's first Foral (charter) to Pena de Domus, the medieval designation for the burgh. This foral was confirmed in 1217, by King D. Afonso II.

By the end of the 14th century, D. Fernando donated Penedono to Trancoso, whose signeurs wanted to tear down the castle. The senior residents of Penedono petitioned the King to stop this intention and to return the municipality to its status. At that time, Penedono disputed with Trancoso being the birthplace of the legendary knight Magriço.

The castle was partially rebuilt over the existing structures, under the initiative of D. Vasco Fernandes Coutinho, to whom D. Fernando donated the castle. Many of the great men of the town petitioned D. John I to confirm his son, Gonçalo Vasques Coutinho, as the master of the lands, owing to Gonçalo's repeatedly placing his shield men and soldiers in the defence of the castle. The castle was the supposed birthplace of D. Álvaro Gonçalves Coutinho, celebrated by Luís de Camões as o Magriço, one of the legendary twelve knights that went to England to defend the honour of twelve damsels in the Corte of the Lancasters. Between 1471 and 1530, under the authority of D. Francisco Coutinho, Count of Marialva, and responsible for the public works in the Comarca of Beira, the castle was transformed into a residence. A new foral was the issue on 27 November 1512. Through the alcalde, the settlement paid to the Crown 2$970 cruzeiros annually. By 1527, the cadastre for the kingdom indicated that this population included 486 homes.

The 1758 Memórias Paroquiais, included a description of the castle, that was constructed of small stone and mortar.

Visited by Alexandre Herculano, the fortress of Penedono was encountered in ruins at the time and remained until the 20th century. In the 1940s, as part of the commemorations of the 300th anniversary of the Portuguese Restoration, promoted by the Portuguese Estado Novo government, the castle was recuperated and renovated. Between 1940 and 1941, the DGEMN (General Directorate of National Buildings and Monuments) was responsible for excavations and debris involved in the construction of the mixed masonry walls, with lime mortar and sand. In addition, the stairs, landings and pavements were replaced with slabs of masonry. Further work in 1949, the third-floor plan and tower were repaved, there were repairs of the ceilings, installation of new doors and re-landscaping the accessways. Consolidation of the joints and consolidation of the parapets proceeded in 1953, along with arranging the stairs, false ceilings, construction of a granite staircase to connect the adarves and installation of ironwork grades to protect the battlements.

In 1959 the spaces were cleaned and the doors were repaired. It was only in 1966 that the castle was illuminated. Further work was begun in 1969, that included the installation of oak ceilings, passage to the tower, cleaning and removal of weeds along the battlements, walls, merlons, staircases, pavements and accesses, leveling of the floors and substitution of the locks.

In 1972, there was a study of the castle and its surroundings.

Various projects began in 1983, to consolidate and repair the barbican and walls of the castle, that included covering holes in the granite, mortaring cracks and joints, repairing the pyramidal merlons, support beams, the iron staircase and complimentary handrail. The spaces were also repainted.

A risk analysis by the DGEMN was undertaken at the castle in October 2005.

== Architecture ==
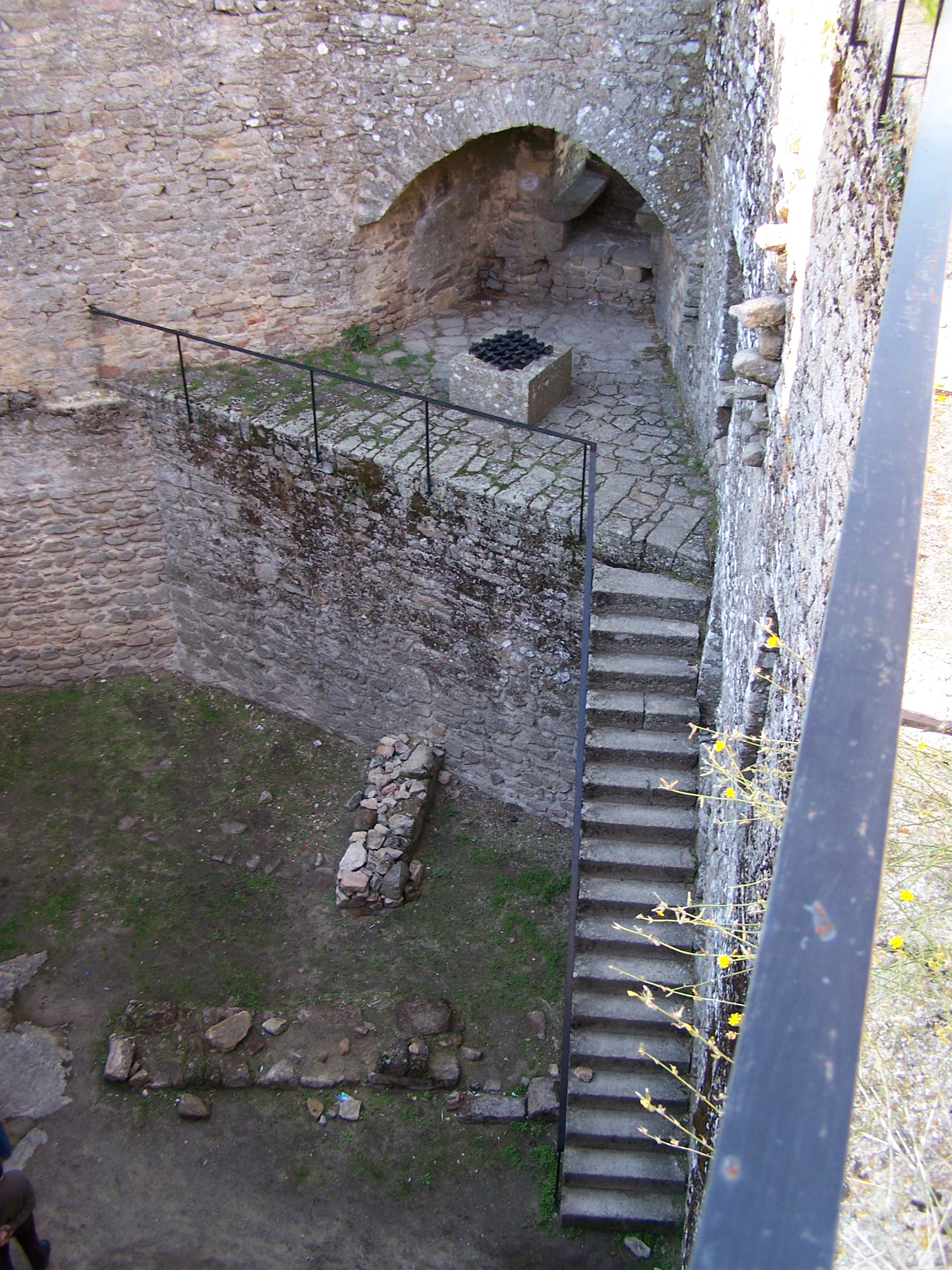
The access to the cistern within the castle

The castle is situated in an isolate, urban area, implanted on a 930 metres (3,050 ft) rocky, hilltop and granite range that is part of the Serra de Serigo. The landscape is accessible by a frontal square by large granite landings and staircase and urbanized portions of Penedono that extend to the south and west. The square allows access to the town pillory and the old building of the municipal council (Portuguese: Antiga Casa da Câmara).

The polygonal plan forms an irregular heptagon, with a 70 metres (230 ft) perimeter, encircled by an undecorated, low barbican that accompanies the same elevation of the rocky hilltop. It is only broken to the southwest, by the irregular staircase and landing leading to the two slender towers at its entrance. To the right of the gate is a small, isolated line of walls. The castle's walls are crowned along its perimeter by parallelpetic merlons with pyramidal tops, some with the arrowslits, and reinforced on its corners by five rectangular corners. Situated along irregular intervals are balconies with micholletes and gargoyles, in addition to arrowslits. Between the two towers to the southwest, is a walkway with guardrail over the cornice, supporting a large arch over which is a rounded doorway (accessible by a flight of curved staircase) surmounted by a framed tympanum. The remaining walls are broken by rectangular arrowslits and fenestrations.

Within the walls are vestiges of the Alcazaba that include stairs that lead to the battlements that encircle the walls and tower landings. Some of the windows, with different cutouts, that suggests the existence of an intermediate floor. In the largest tower is a domed vault with rectangular window, in front of which is a polygonal cistern with a covered cross vault. At the beginning of the battlements are vestiges of primitive constructions.
