= São João da Pesqueira =

- Municipality
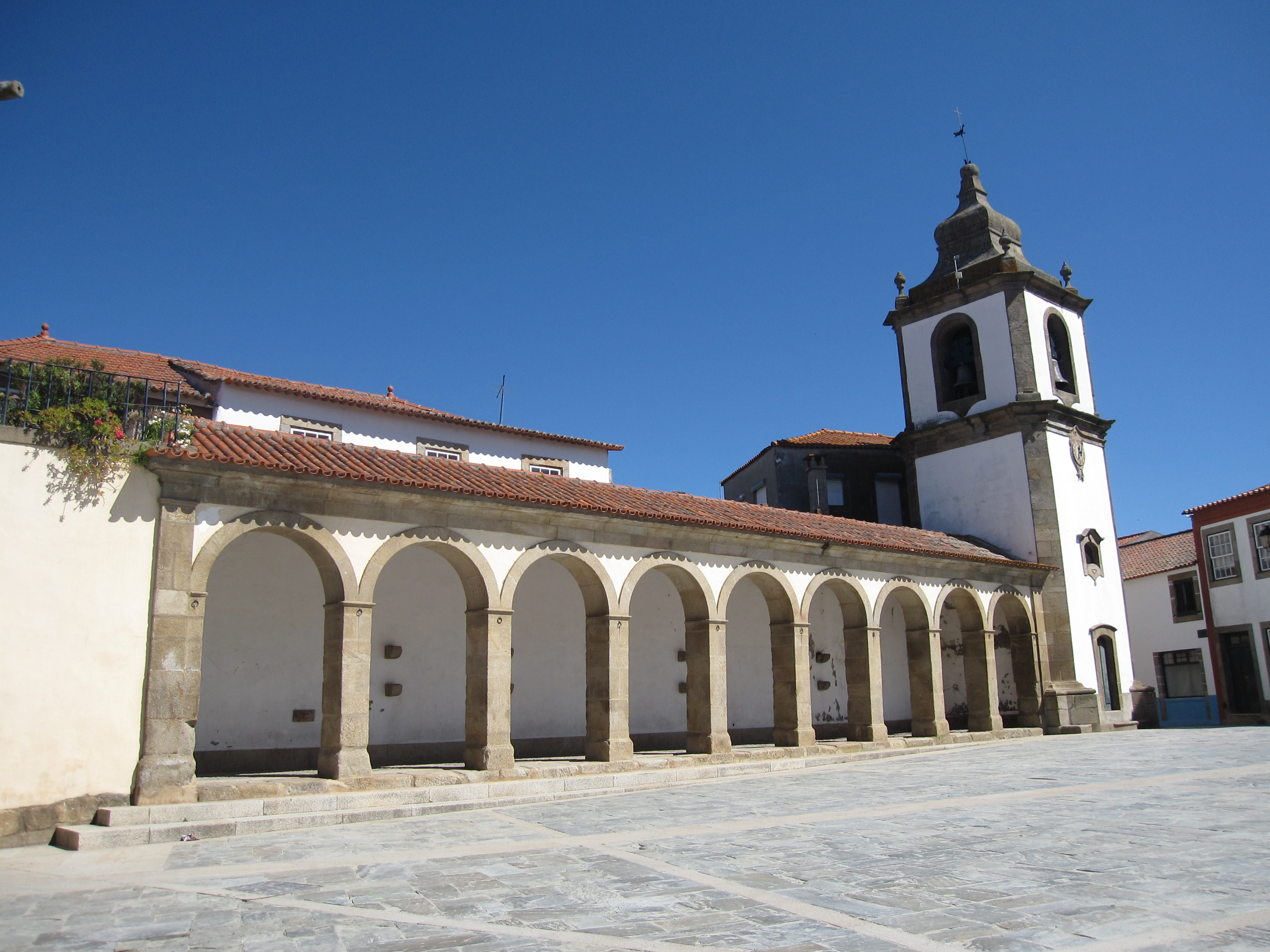
- View of São João da Pesqueira

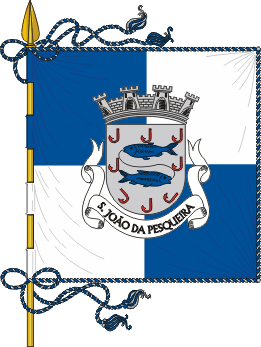
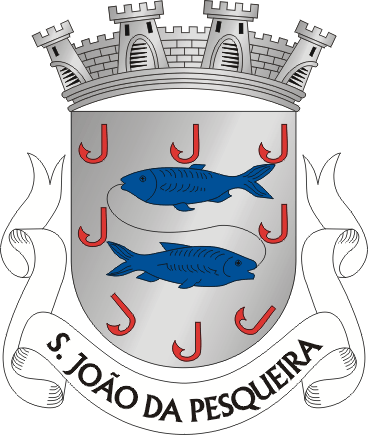
- Flag Coat of arms
- Interactive map of São João da Pesqueira
- Coordinates: 41°08′N 7°24′W
- Country: Portugal
- Region: Norte
- Intermunic. comm.: Douro
- District: Viseu
- Parishes: 11

Government
  - President: Manuel Cordeiro (Ind.)

Area
  - Total: 266.11 km^{2} (102.75 sq mi)

Population (2021)
  - Total: 6,775
  - Density: 25.46/km^{2} (65.94/sq mi)
- Time zone: UTC+00:00 (WET)
  - Summer (DST): UTC+01:00 (WEST)
- Website: www.sjpesqueira.pt

São João da Pesqueira (European Portuguese pronunciation: [sɐ̃w ʒuˈɐ̃w ðɐ pɨʃˈkɐjɾɐ]) is a municipality and town in the district of Viseu, in northern Portugal. As of the 2021 census, the municipality had a population of 6,775, covering an area of 266.11 square kilometres (102.75 mi^{2}). The town itself is located in the civil parish of São João da Pesqueira e Várzea de Trevões, which had 2,273 inhabitants in the same year. The present mayor is Manuel Cordeiro, elected by a citizens' movement and the municipal holiday is June 24.

Human presence in the region dates back at least 7,000 years. The town is notable for having received, together with the nearby locations of Penela, Paredes da Beira, Linhares and Ansiães, the earliest known royal charter (foral) in the territory of modern Portugal, issued between 1055 and 1065 by Ferdinand I of León. Culturally, the municipality maintains a strong calendar of religious and seasonal traditions, including pilgrimages, Easter rituals, and May festivals.

Geographically, São João da Pesqueira comprises 11 civil parishes and sits at an altitude of 850 metres (2,790 ft), bordered by the Douro River to the north. The landscape is marked by terraced vineyards, river valleys, and elevated viewpoints such as those at São Salvador do Mundo, offering panoramic views over the Valeira Dam and the Douro valley. São João da Pesqueira lies within the Alto Douro Wine Region, a UNESCO World Heritage Site, and accounts for approximately 20% of the classified area. The municipality is known for its production of Port and Douro wines, with vineyards forming the backbone of the local economy.

== History ==
Human presence in the area of São João da Pesqueira dates back at least 7000 years, according to archaeological evidence.

São João da Pesqueira, together with the nearby locations of Penela, Paredes da Beira, Linhares and Ansiães, received the first royal charter (foral) in the territory of modern-day Portugal. It was issued by Ferdinand I of León between 1055 and 1065, predating the forais of larger historical cities such as Coimbra, Guimarães or Lamego, and it included the payment of wine as tribute to the king. Its issuance is linked to Ferdinand's military campaigns during the Christian reconquest of the Beira region, a time when the weakening of the Emirate of Córdoba led to gains by Christian forces. After seizing key locations such as Seia, Viseu, Lamego, and Coimbra, the Leonese king sought to consolidate control over the newly occupied lands through settlement and legal organization by granting charters.

The foral was later confirmed by several Portuguese monarchs: Afonso I, while still an infante, Afonso II in 1217, Afonso III in 1256, and Manuel I in 1510. The confirmation by Afonso III included a detailed reaffirmation of legal privileges and local obligations, including tributes in the form of bread, wine, barley, and hunting rights, as well as detailed regulations regarding criminal penalties, civil disputes, and communal responsibilities.

The area's wine estates were heavily affected by the phylloxera outbreak in the 19th century, which led to the abandonment or repurposing of many wine estate properties. One such example is the Casa do Cabo, which was at the time converted into a tribunal.

In recognition of its contribution to the wine-growing heritage of the region, the municipality became part of the UNESCO World Heritage-designated Alto Douro Wine Region in 2001. São João da Pesqueira holds the largest share of the classified area, approximately 20% of the total.

== Geography ==
Population of São João da Pesqueira (1801 - 2021)
| Year | Pop. | ±% |
|---|---|---|
| 1801 | 3,203 | — |
| 1849 | 5,734 | +79.0% |
| 1900 | 12,505 | +118.1% |
| 1930 | 12,764 | +2.1% |
| 1960 | 15,124 | +18.5% |
| 1981 | 10,219 | −32.4% |
| 1991 | 9,581 | −6.2% |
| 2001 | 8,653 | −9.7% |
| 2011 | 7,874 | −9.0% |
| 2021 | 6,775 | −14.0% |

The municipality is situated at 850 metres (2,790 ft) above sea level and is bordered on the north by the River Douro and the municipality of Alijó, on the northeast by Carrazeda de Ansiães, on the east by Vila Nova de Foz Côa (district of Guarda), on the south-east by Penedono, on the south by Sernancelhe, on the west by Tabuaço and on the north-west by Sabrosa. The municipality includes an attractive countryside with viewpoints over the Douro valley and the Valeira dam from the chapel of São Salvador do Mundo (Ermo).

Administratively, the municipality is divided into 11 civil parishes:

- Castanheiro do Sul
- Ervedosa do Douro
- Nagoselo do Douro
- Paredes da Beira
- Riodades
- São João da Pesqueira e Várzea de Trevões
- Soutelo do Douro
- Trevões e Espinhosa
- Vale de Figueira
- Valongo dos Azeites
- Vilarouco e Pereiros

== Economy ==
Situated in the heart of the Douro wine region, São João da Pesqueira is well endowed with vineyards that support the production of vintage and port wines.

Tourist attractions include a wine museum in Pesqueira and a network of waymarked hiking trails, including a section of the GR 14 Porto to Strasbourg Rota dos Vinhos da Europa (European Wine Route trail).

== Culture ==
The cultural traditions of São João da Pesqueira are strongly marked by a rich calendar of religious and seasonal festivities, many of which have deep historical roots and reflect the rhythms of agricultural life and Catholic devotion. However, some practices have faded or changed, affected by the population decline in the municipality since the 1960s. According to the accounts collected in the early 2000s, many residents recall these traditions with a sense of nostalgia. While acknowledging that living conditions were materially more difficult in the past, older generations often described village life as more joyful and socially cohesive.

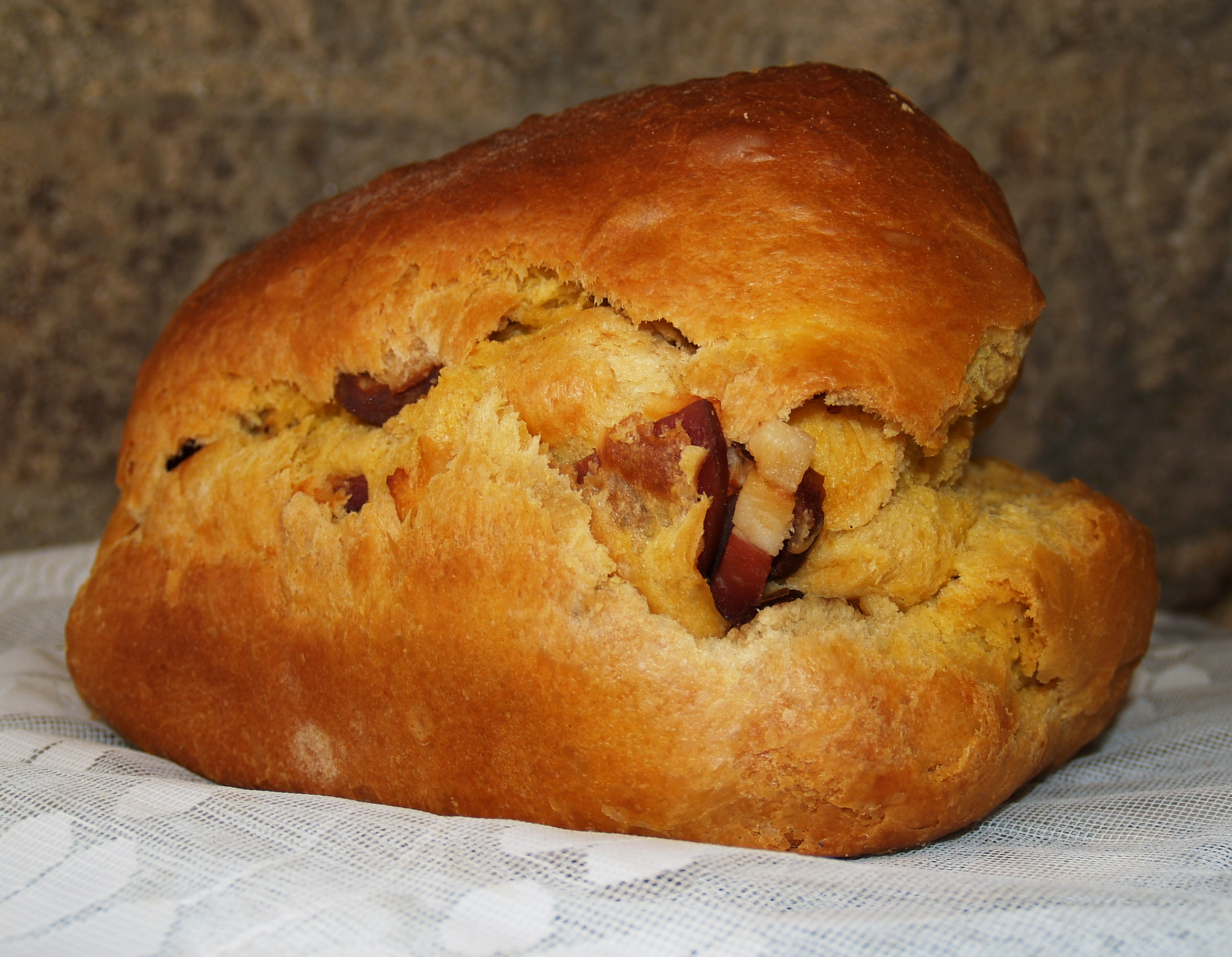
Folar

One of the best-preserved traditions is the Easter compasso, in which the parish priest and a group of boys visit homes to bless them, often in exchange for symbolic offerings. This practice remains widespread in the municipality, although gifts have gradually shifted from homemade foodstuffs to money placed in envelopes. The giving of folar, a sweet or savory Easter gift, continues as part of godparent-godchild relationships. Easter is also marked by religious processions, communal meals featuring roast goat or lamb, and gatherings for music and dance, particularly in the town and larger parishes. Some villages, such as Ervedosa, still prepare traditional biscuits for the occasion, which are often sent to relatives living elsewhere.

The pilgrimage to the chapel of Nossa Senhora da Alegria in Riodades now takes place in September, having been moved from Ascension Day in May during the mid-20th century to encourage greater participation. It remains a significant religious and social event, involving a procession, novena, and offerings of flowers and personal promises. In earlier times, the pilgrimage had strong agro-pastoral significance, since shepherds would bring their flocks to circle the chapel in a ritual believed to protect the animals from disease.

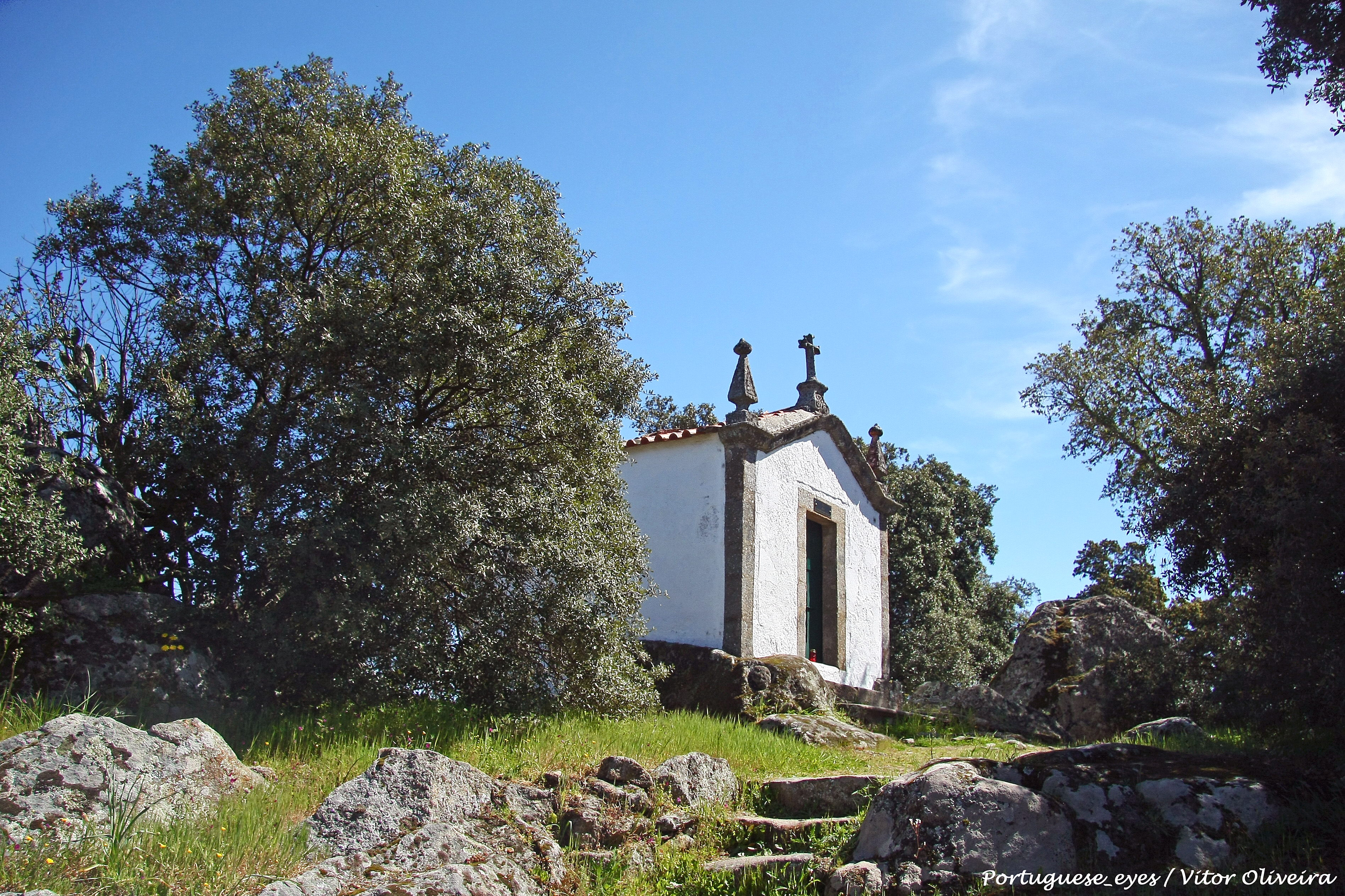
São Salvador do Mundo

The Santuário de S. Salvador do Mundo continues to be an important pilgrimage site. It hosts festivities during the Corpus Christi period, including a mass and community celebration. In earlier decades, the site attracted pilgrims from across the region, particularly from the neighboring Carrazeda de Ansiães. Traditions included overnight stays under a porch, communal meals, and symbolic gestures such as tying knots in broom branches to ensure marriage prospects. Although these customs have largely faded, religious observance at the site remains active. The Corpus Christi procession in the town is still celebrated but in a simplified form, with a focus on religious devotion. In the 18th century, it was one of the most elaborate festivities, featuring allegorical dances, costumed figures, and a formal parade organized by trade guilds, followed by a bull run in the main square. These elements were gradually phased out during the 19th century, particularly after the abolition of the guild system in 1834.

May festivals, such as the Festa das Cruzes (May 3) and Ascension Day, are still observed in various parishes. In places like Paredes da Beira and Soutelo, these involve the blessing of crops, processions to rural chapels, and the collection of wildflowers and wheat stalks (espigas), which are kept in homes or placed in fields as protective tokens. A widespread custom on the first of May is the hanging of yellow broom flowers (maias) on doors, windows or cars, to ward off evil. In earlier times, these festivals were also associated with communal meals, ritual feasts, and marked the right to afternoon rest (sestas) during the farming season.

Carnival celebrations are today marked by school-organized parades, typically held on the Friday before Carnival, featuring children in costume and performances coordinated by local schools. Until the mid-to-late 20th century, however, Carnival was one of the most exuberant and locally distinctive celebrations in the municipality. Many villages held mock funerals for symbolic figures such as the Pai da Fartura or Santo Entrudo, which were burned in public squares after a satirical trial and "testament" critiquing local behavior. These rituals, along with masquerades, mock marriages, and anonymous public satire (pulhas) shouted from hilltops through funnels, have since disappeared. Another tradition no longer in practice was the serração da velha, in which boys mockingly "sawed" the doors of gossiping older women at night.

== Landmarks ==
=== Civil landmarks ===
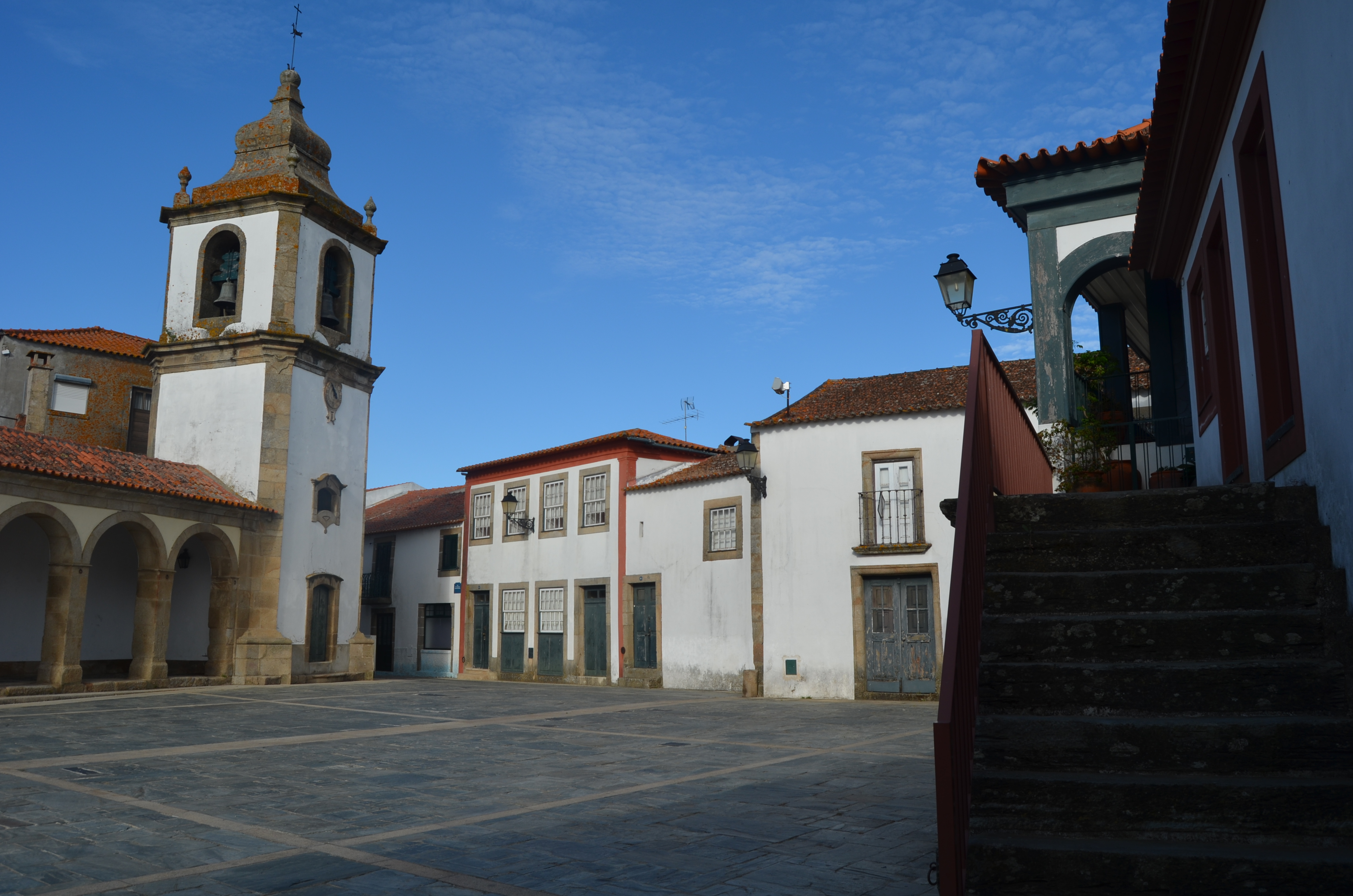
Republic Square

In the historic center of São João da Pesqueira lies the Republic Square (Praça da República), which features a collection of restored historic buildings and architectural elements. Other notable structures in the square include an arch, a clock tower, and an 18th-century arcade that formerly served as a marketplace.

The Eduardo Tavares Museum (Museu Eduardo Tavares) lies in a central location, housed in a Baroque building bearing the royal coat of arms commissioned by Queen Maria I in 1794. The building has served various public functions over time, including the municipal government headquarters and later the district jail, after the town hall moved to another location. Restoration work began in 2001, and in 2003 the museum opened with exhibitions presenting the municipality's archaeological collection and donated works of sculpture and painting by Eduardo Tavares.

Located opposite the main church, the Town Hall building (Edifício dos Paços do Concelho) is a rectangular, palatial-style structure. Its architectural features include granite moldings, an iron balcony, a prominent cornice topped by the town's coat of arms, and an atrium containing tile panels illustrating ethnographic scenes related to grape growing and winemaking.

Behind Republic Square is Rua dos Gatos, a narrow street historically associated with the Jewish and New Christian community of the town. Characterized by predominantly schist houses, the street retains the irregular layout typical of medieval urban centers.

The town features the Wine Museum (Museu do Vinho) focuses on the viticulture and wine production of the Douro region. The museum includes a permanent exhibition on wine-related themes, a tasting room, wine shop, wine bar, and cultural spaces.

Casa do Cabo is a small manor house featuring a post-Pombaline Joanine coat of arms and is regarded as one of the notable examples of the region's built heritage. Designed by architect Nicolau Nasoni, it was the residence of the Sande e Castro family, prominent landowners in the Douro region.

The Cidrô Palace (Palácio de Cidrô), located about 8 kilometres (5.0 mi) from the Douro River, is part of an estate where vineyards were first planted in the 19th century. The palace belonged to Luís de Soveral Vassalo e Sousa, grandfather of Luís Maria Pinto de Soveral, the first Marquis of Soveral, who was born there in 1851. The estate hosted notable guests such as King Manuel II and King Carlos I during grape harvest seasons. Large receptions and gala events were held at Casa do Cabo. In 1972, the Douro Wine Company acquired the estate and undertook extensive renovation, including modernization of the house and large-scale vertical vineyard planting.

=== Religious landmarks ===
São Salvador do Mundo is known for its historical, religious, and natural significance. The site features two viewpoints offering scenic views of the Valeira region and its dam. Archaeological evidence indicates human occupation since the 2nd millennium BC, including prehistoric rock carvings and Roman artifacts such as tiles, ceramics, and inscriptions. The sanctuary includes nine chapels representing stations of the cross, built beginning in 1594 by Gaspar da Piedade, who brought a relic of Saint Jerome. The area also holds medieval remnants and a history tied to the dangerous Cachão da Valeira river passage, important for historical Douro river navigation.

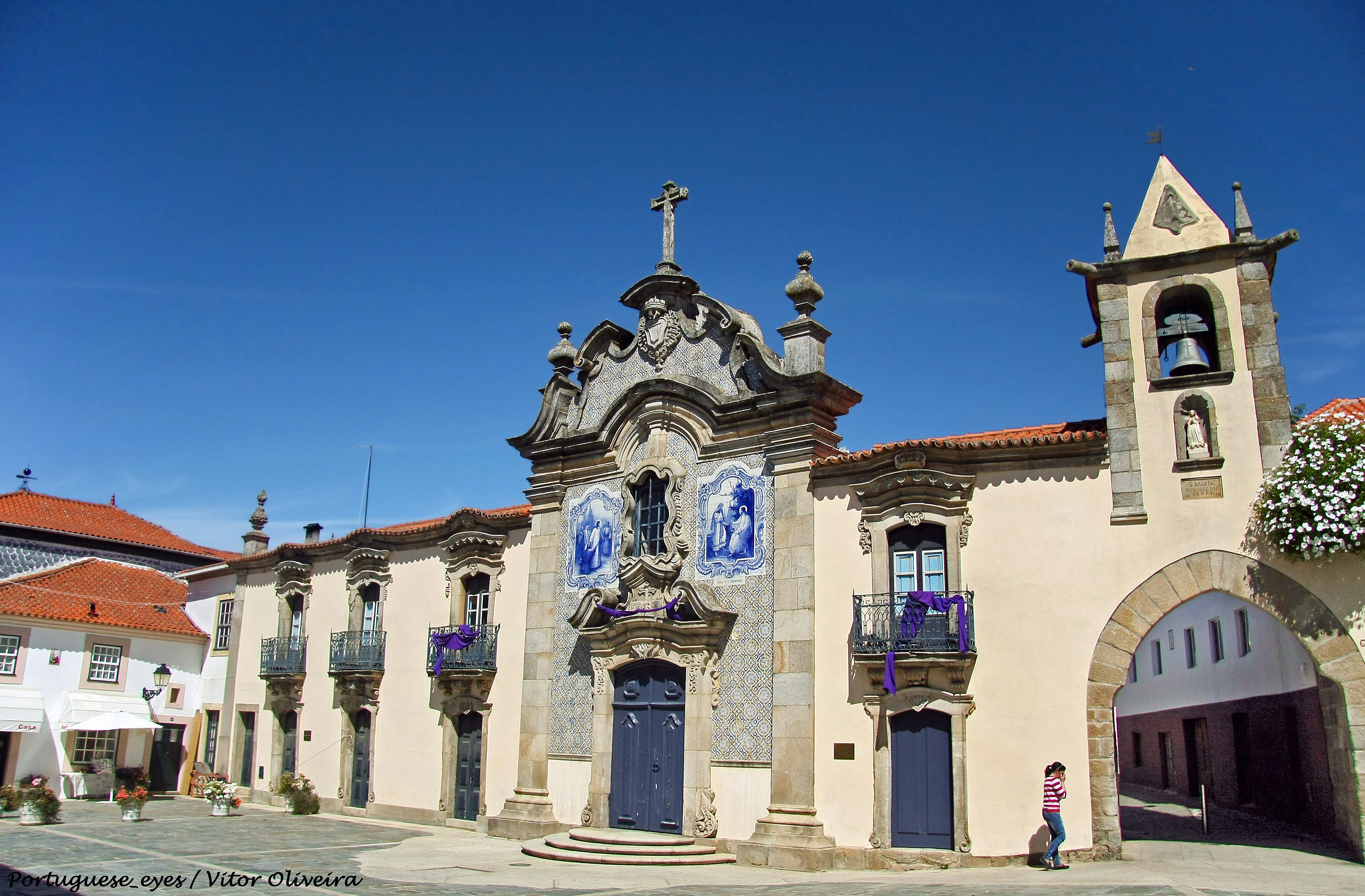
Chapel of Mercy

The Chapel of Senhora da Alegria is located in the parish of Riodades at 630 metres (2,070 ft) altitude, featuring a staircase leading to it. It offers views over the surrounding mountains and traditional regional houses.

The Chapel of Mercy (Capela da Misericórdia) is located at the Republic Square. It is notable for its Baroque façade decorated with two tile panels depicting scenes of "Christ and the Samaritan Woman" and "Christ Healing a Sick Man." This chapel was originally private property of the noble family of Luís Álvares de Távora, lord of the town, who later donated it to the local charitable institution (misericórdia).

The Chapel of Senhora do Rosário, built in 1574, is dedicated to the Virgin of the Rosary. Its interior includes an altar with several religious figures. The chapel is surrounded by a small yard with cypress trees and hosts an annual pilgrimage on Easter Monday.

== Notable people ==
- Luís Pinto de Soveral (1851 – 1922), a Portuguese diplomat and the first Marquis of Soveral.
