= Trevões =

- Civil parish
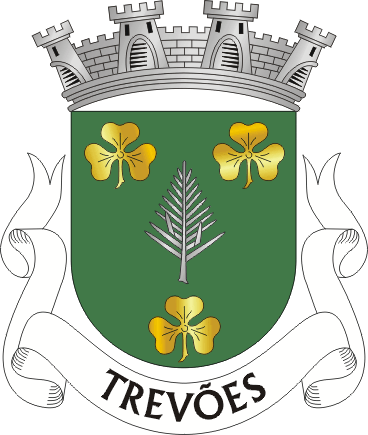
- Coat of arms

- Location in Portugal
- Coordinates: 41.0822°N 7.4339°W
- Country: Portugal
- Region: Norte
- Intermunic. comm.: Douro
- District: Viseu
- Municipality: São João da Pesqueira

Area
  - Total: 21.55 km^{2} (8.32 sq mi)

Population (2011)
  - Total: 540
  - Density: 25/km^{2} (65/sq mi)
- Time zone: UTC+00:00 (WET)
  - Summer (DST): UTC+01:00 (WEST)
- Postal code: 5130-421
- Website: http://www.trevoes.net

Trevões is a village and (with the neighbouring village of Espinhosa, 4 km to the WNW) a civil parish (freguesia) in the municipality of São João da Pesqueira in the Viseu of Portugal. It is located approximately 8 km SSW of the town of São João da Pesqueira. Although small in size (the area of the parish is 21.55 km^{2} and there were 540 inhabitants in 2011), the village possesses a church with some notable frescoes, and two museums, one devoted to artefacts of the village and surrounding countryside, and the other to religious art; there are also many ancient houses in its historic centre. The philosopher José Maria da Cunha Seixas was born in the village.

The village had its own town council from 1159 to the middle of the 19th century, and by the end of that time many of the parishes that now fall into the municipality of São João da Pesqueira were governed from Trevões.

The GR 14 long-distance footpath passes through the village.
