= Távora River =

River in northern Portugal

Távora
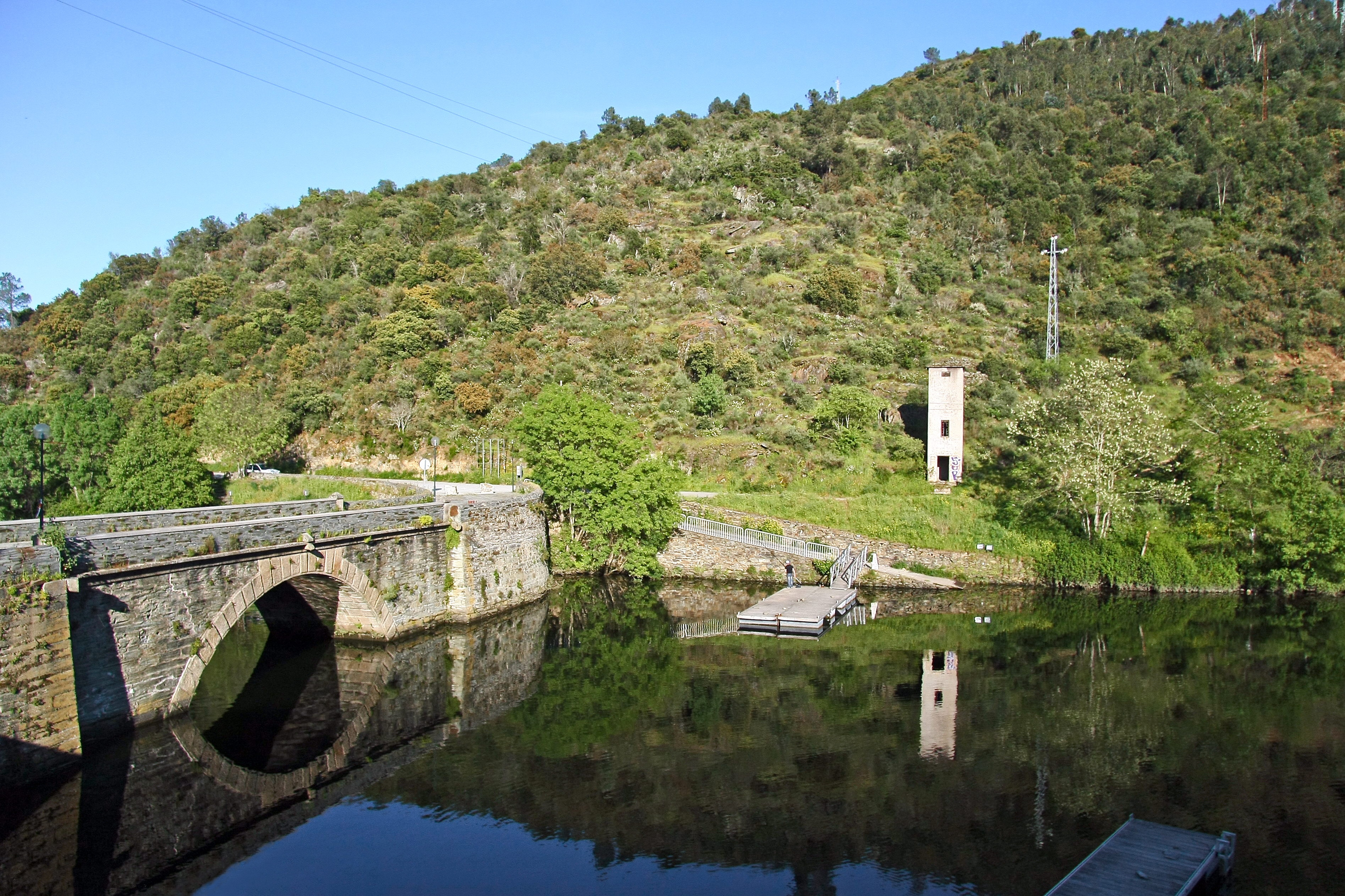

- Location within Portugal

Location
- Country: Portugal

Physical characteristics
- Source
  - location: Trancoso
- Mouth: Douro
  - location: near Tabuaço
  - coordinates: 41°9′28″N 7°34′55″W
- Basin size: 535.9 square kilometres (206.9 mi^{2})

Basin features
- Progression: Douro→ Atlantic Ocean

The Távora (Portuguese pronunciation: [ˈtavuɾɐ]) is a river that rises near Trancoso and flows north until it flows into the river Douro, of which it is a tributary. Its main tributaries are the Gradiz, Rio de Mel, Azores and Lezíria streams.

Originating in Trancoso (district of Guarda), it passes through many locations like Vila do Abade, Vila da Ponte (Sernancelhe), Escurquela, Riodades, Granjinha, Távora e Pereiro and Tabuaço, going into the left bank of the Douro after having traveled about 47 kilometers.

It has an important reservoir, created by the Vilar Dam located between the parishes of Vilar and Fonte Arcada. This reservoir helps to normalize the Douro River flows, It is used for the production of electricity and is also recently used for the abstraction of water for public supply.

== Etymology ==
Távora comes from the Latin tabula which means plank or wood for planks and by extension chestnut trees, which in the ancient world were used to make planks of excellence. Thus the Távora River means "river of the boards" or "chestnut trees", appropriate name for the time because the great valley of the Távora was flooded in chestnut trees, being still today the Council of Sernancelhe considered the land of the chestnut.

Távora River - Rio Távora

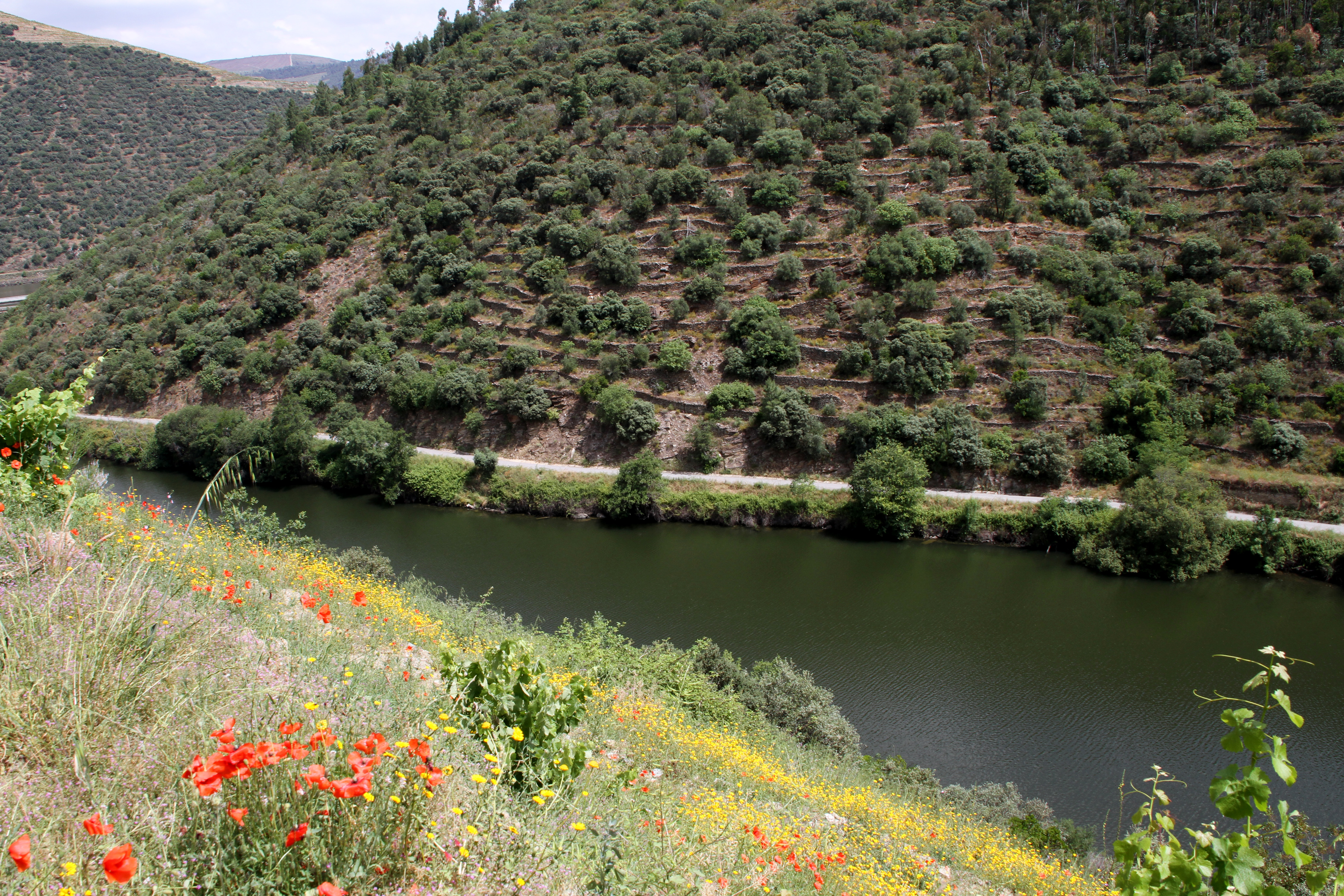

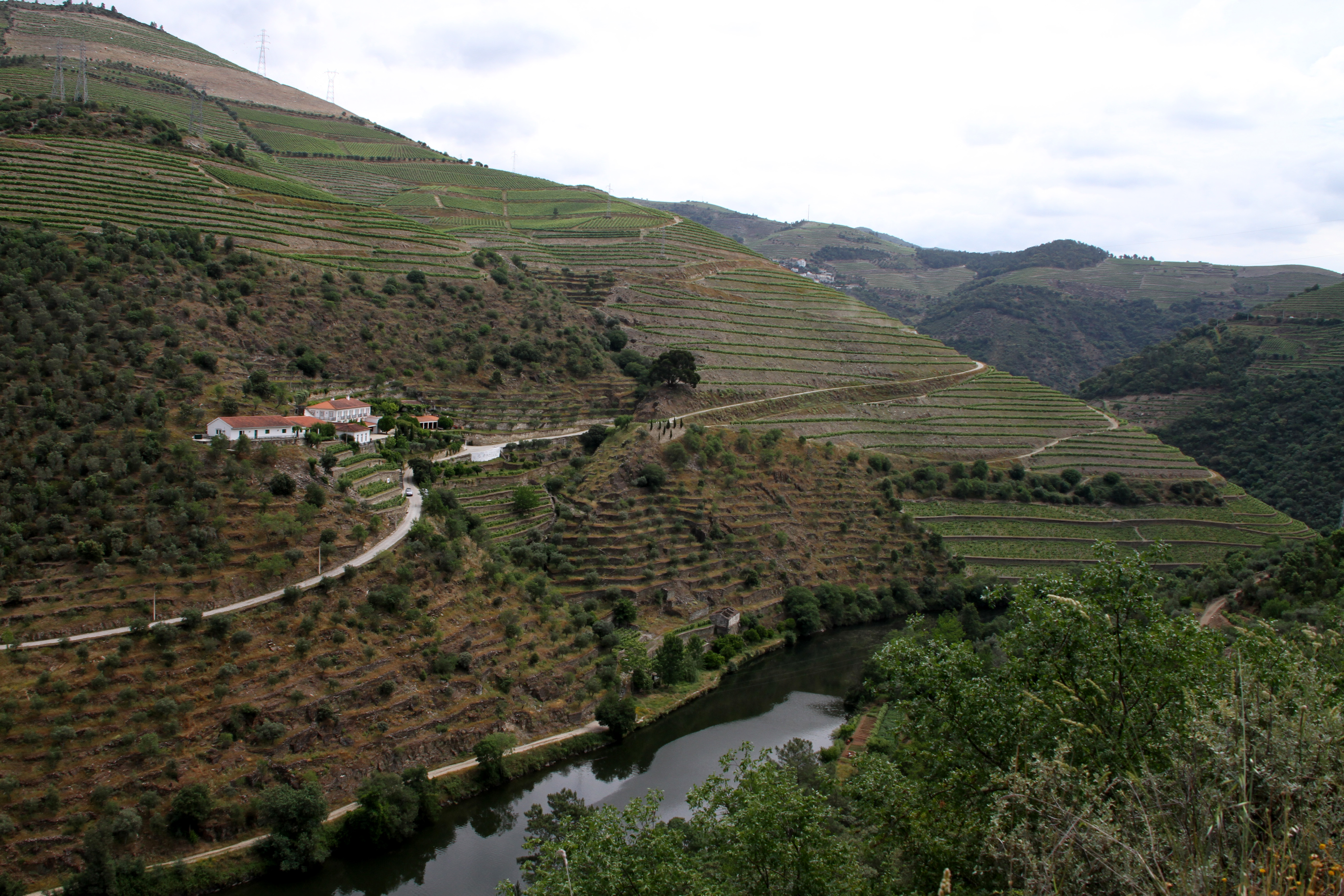

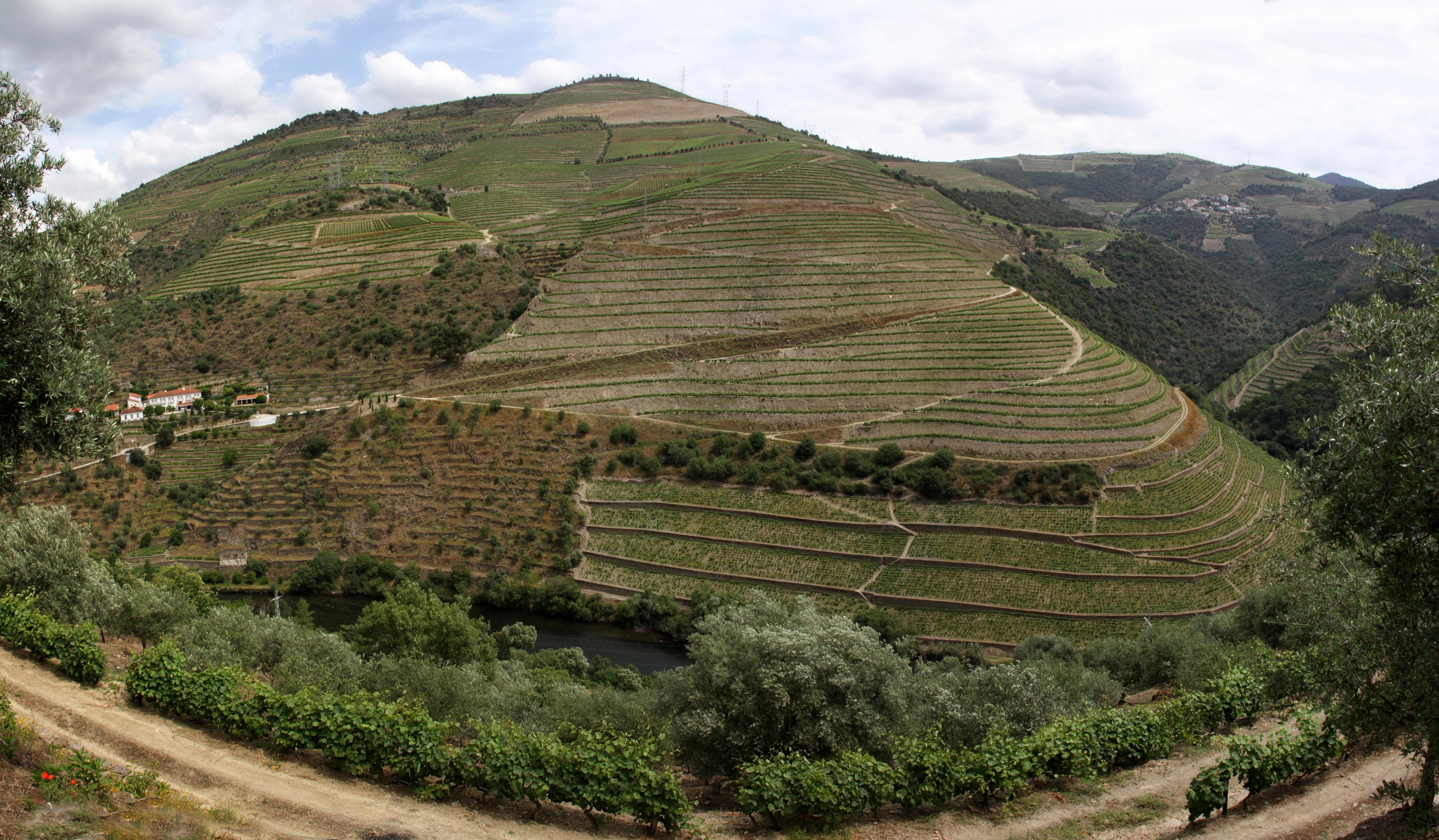

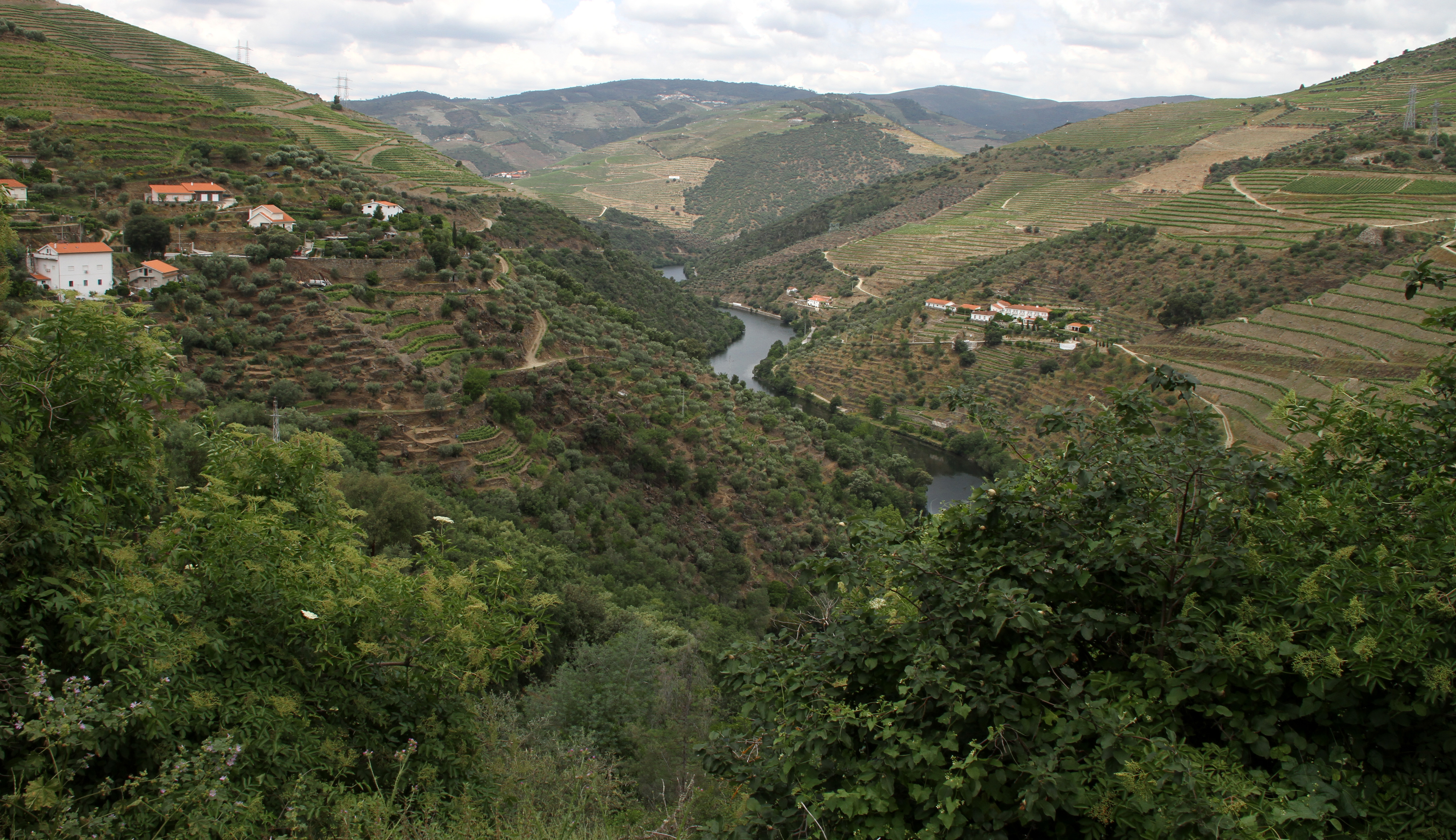

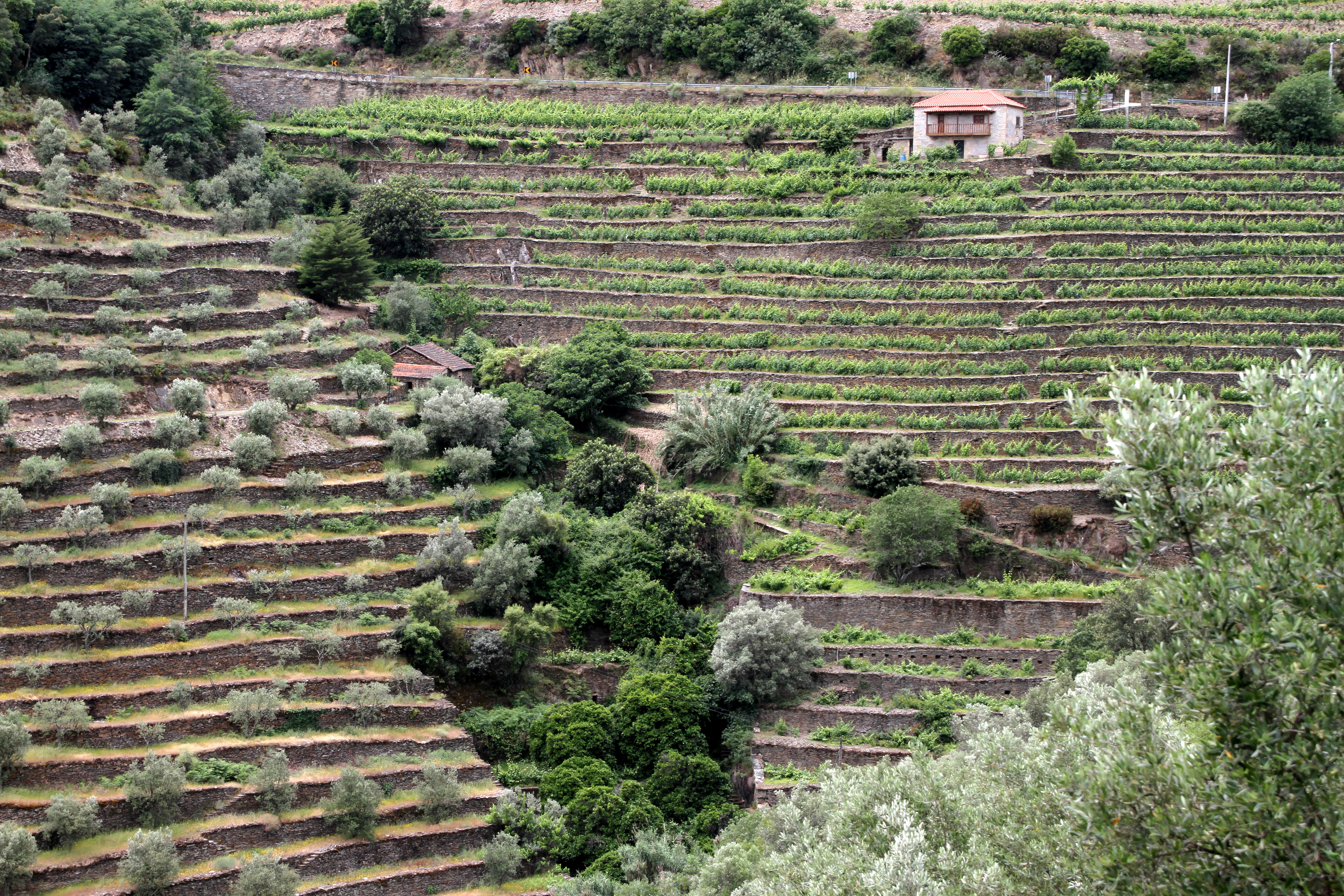

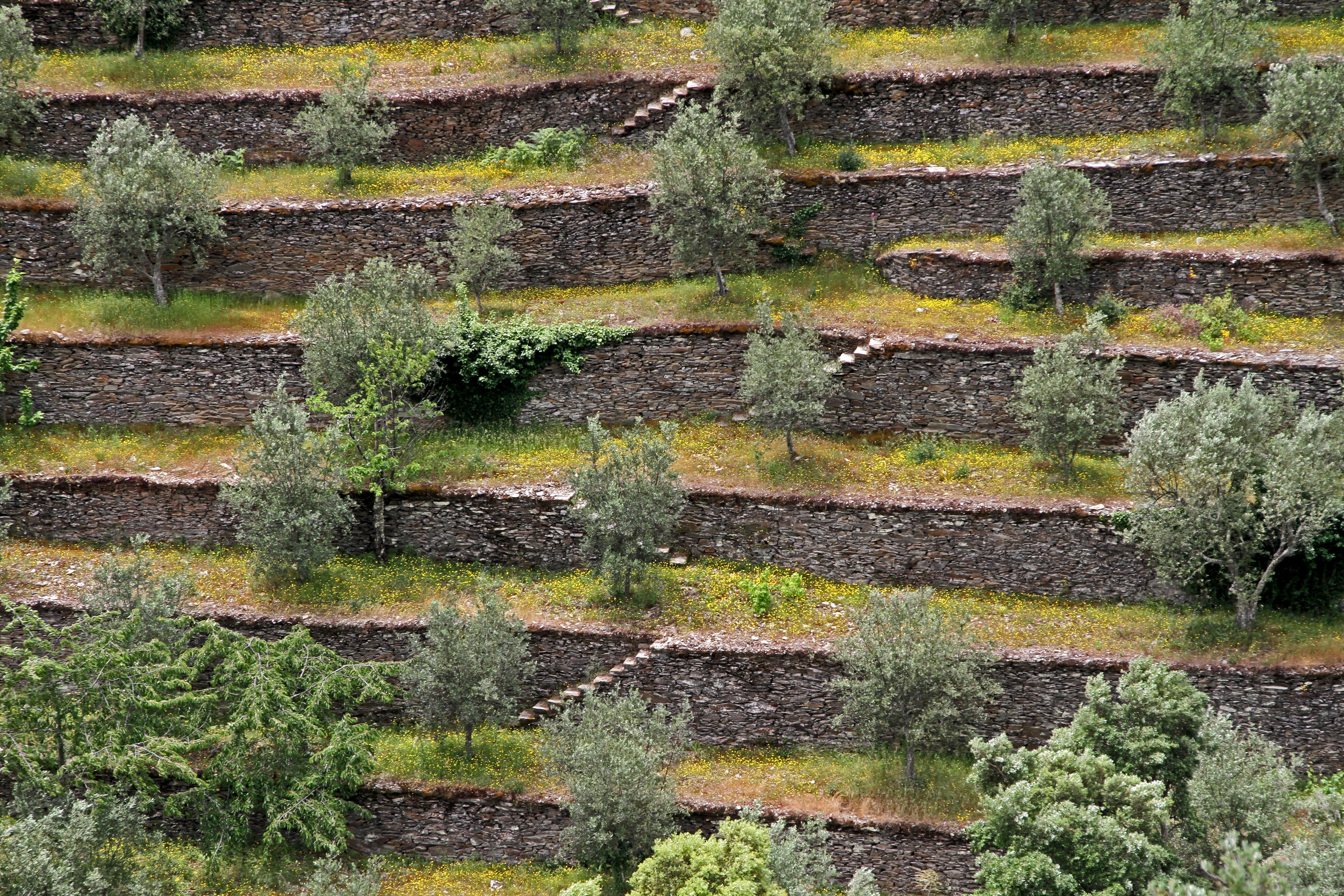
