= Ervedosa do Douro =

- Civil parish
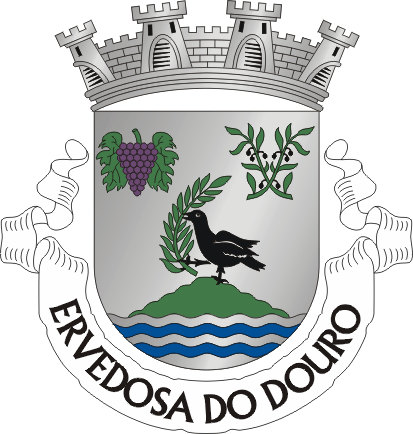
- Coat of arms

- Location in Portugal
- Coordinates: 41.166°N 7.474°W
- Country: Portugal
- Region: Norte
- Intermunic. comm.: Douro
- District: Viseu
- Municipality: São João da Pesqueira

Area
  - Total: 40.24 km^{2} (15.54 sq mi)

Population (2011)
  - Total: 1,294
  - Density: 32/km^{2} (83/sq mi)
- Time zone: UTC+00:00 (WET)
  - Summer (DST): UTC+01:00 (WEST)

Ervedosa do Douro is a civil parish in the municipality of São João da Pesqueira, Portugal. The population in 2011 was 1,294, in an area of 40.24 km^{2}.
