= Fumo Liyongo =

Swahili writer and chieftain alive sometime between the 9th and 13th centuries

Fumo Liyongo or Liongo was a Swahili writer and chieftain on the northern part of the coast of East Africa sometime between the 9th and 13th centuries. He is celebrated as a hero, warrior, and poet in traditional poems, stories, and songs of the Swahili people, many associated with wedding rituals and gungu dances. Liongo himself is credited with many such songs and poems. Oral tradition is generally coherent in describing Liongo as a king or prince of Pate Island. Several towns on the Tanzanian coast claim to be Liongo's birthplace. He is supposedly buried at Ozi.

== Sources ==
Most of the literature on Liongo belongs to the oral tradition but a few songs about Liongo, in an archaic form of Swahili transcribed into the Arabic and Latin alphabets, dating back to around the 13th century, provide valuable historical and anthropological data. They describe ancient wedding rituals, the role of palm wine in ancient Swahili society, and gungu dances. Some narrate episodes from the hero's life, others are war hymns (for example, the Sifu Uta Wangu or "Song of the Warrior" in which Liongo celebrates the virtues of his bow). Liongo is often represented as a master of the art of archery, sometimes in terms very close to the Robin Hood tales. In one such story, a king organizes an archery tournament to lure Liongo into his court and seize him yet Liongo manages to win the tournament and escape. Some of the best known texts from the Liongo corpus are Liongo na Mmanga, Hadithi ya Liongo, and Sifu Uta Wangu.

== Historical basis ==
Many elements of the epics of Liongo appear to relate to the transition of the East African coastal society from matrilinear, Bantu organization to a new patrilinear Islamic model. Liongo is sometimes described as a follower of traditional African beliefs and sometimes as a Muslim. This had led some scholars to suggest that he could have lived around the 13th century, when Arabs and Persians began settling in East Africa and the Swahili culture began to take shape.

According to scholar Ibrahim Noor Shariff, Liyongo likely lived around the 10th century during the golden age of Shanga, where he resided.

== Character ==
Traditional stories of Liongo have many common traits with those of European heroes such as Achilles, Sigurd, and Robin Hood. A strict prince and a mighty warrior, he was incredibly tall (almost a giant) and almost invulnerable. The best known part of his life is his fall from grace, either a consequence of the people's anger at his strictness or of a war of succession with his brother (or cousin), sometimes called Hemedi (Ahmad). As a consequence of his fall, Liongo was put in chains but began singing; his songs were also disguised messages to his mother. All the people began to dance (the ancestors of East African gungu dances) and, amid the confusion (and/or with the help of his mother), Liongo managed to escape.

As is the case with Sigurd, Liongo was killed because of a betrayal. He was betrayed by his son, who had unveiled the secret of Liongo's invulnerability. The only thing that could kill him was a copper nail or pin piercing his navel, a secret only known to Liongo himself and his mother Mbowe. Some sources report that when Liongo was killed by the copper pin he knelt, leaning against his bow, to die so that his death would not be seen.
