= Bartolommeo Fumo =

Italian Dominican theologian

Bartolommeo Fumo (died 1545) was an Italian Dominican theologian.

== Life ==
Fumo was born at Villo ("Villaurensis"), near Piacenza in Italy. At an early age he entered the Dominican Order and made great progress in all the ecclesiastical sciences, and especially in canon law. He was an inquisitor at Piacenza.
