= Penedono =

- Municipality
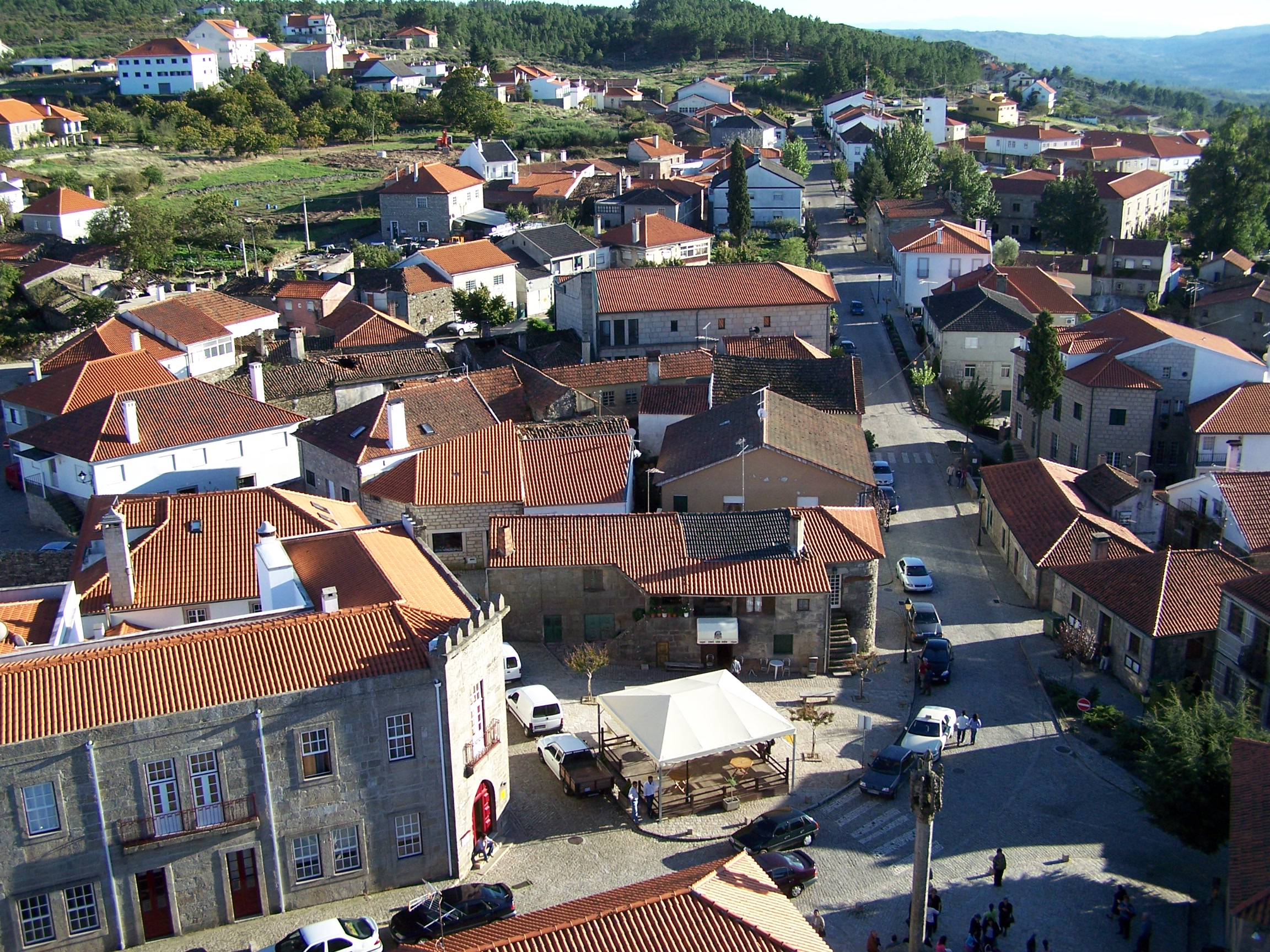
- View from the Castle of Penedono

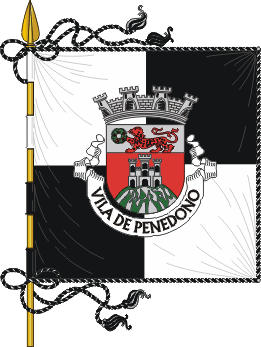
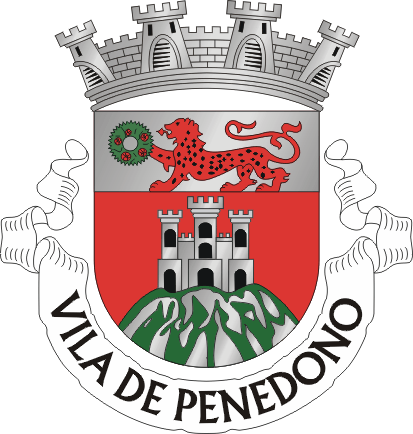
- Flag Coat of arms
- Interactive map of Penedono
- Coordinates: 40°59′15″N 7°23′40″W
- Country: Portugal
- Region: Norte
- Intermunic. comm.: Douro
- District: Viseu
- Parishes: 7

Government
  - President: António Carlos Saraiva Esteves de Carvalho

Area
  - Total: 133.71 km^{2} (51.63 sq mi)
- Elevation: 901 m (2,956 ft)

Population (2011)
  - Total: 2,952
  - Density: 22.08/km^{2} (57.18/sq mi)
- Time zone: UTC+00:00 (WET)
  - Summer (DST): UTC+01:00 (WEST)
- Postal code: 3630
- Patron: São Pedro
- Website: www.cm-penedono.pt

Penedono (European Portuguese pronunciation: [pɨnɨˈðonu]) is a municipality in the northern district of Viseu in Portugal. The population in 2011 was 2,952, in an area of 133.71 km^{2}.

== History ==
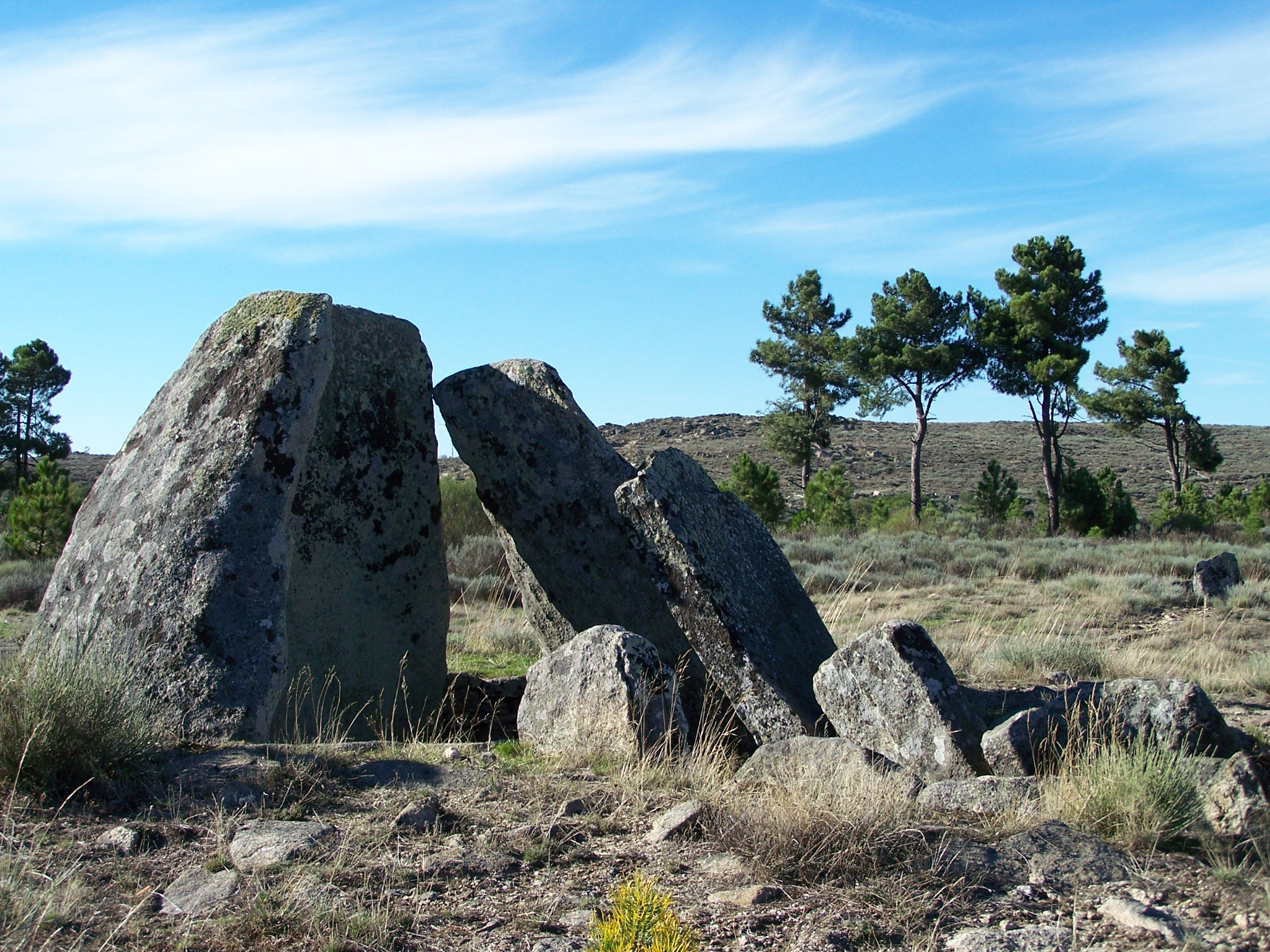
An example of a funerary temple from the Neolithic period in Lameira de Cima

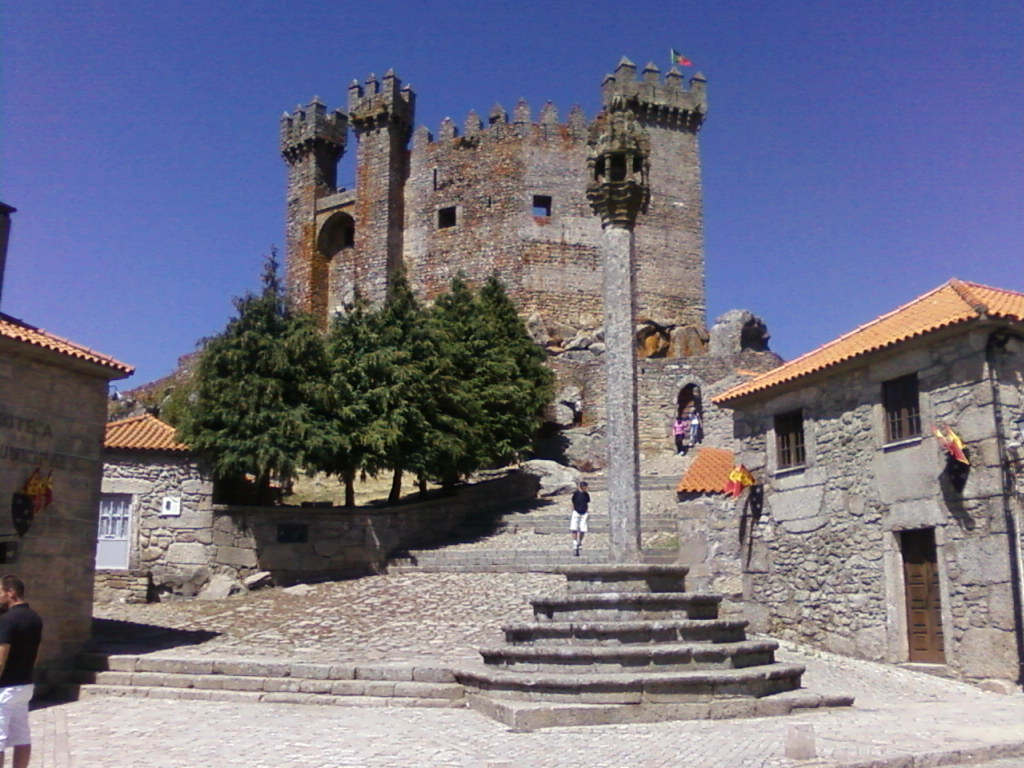
The municipal pillory and medieval Castle of Penedono

The Dolmen culture reached the regions of Penedono during antiquity. The area of Antas, for example, was primarily constructed on the religious-funerary monumental dolmen that was constructed during the Neolithic. In the flanks of the mountains these tribes established castros that were later appropriated by Roman garrisons to support their positions in the lands. They also constructed new roads that intersect the hills, discovering gold and silver deposits, in addition to precious metals, which they exported back to Rome.

But the land was successively occupied by barbarians from eastern Europe, including tribes of Alans, Vandals, Suebi and Visigoths. Two centuries later these groups were displaced by Arab invaders from North Africa, who remained until expulsed in the second half of the 9th century, by Ferdinand I of León and Castile.

=== Middle Ages ===
In 960, the first document appeared that identified the region as Pene de Dono, which was actually a transliteration of Penha ou Castelo de Dono (referring to a 10th-century lord's possession). This reference was actually a letter from a rich lady, the devoted Flâmula (or Chama), who was sick and worried about her death, who sent a message to her aunt Mumadona, a founder of the Monastery of São Salvador de Guimarães, innumeral properties, castles and settlements within Aveiro and Douro and salt fields in Aveiro. Flâmula requested that her possessions and lands be sold and that the monies should be used to benefit captives, pilgrims and monasteries. Of the fortifications mentioned in this sale were the castles Trancoso, Moreira, Longroiva, Numão, Vacinata, Almendra, Pena de Dono, Alcobia, Sernancelhe and Caria, as well as other penal and populations.

By the end of the 12th century, the villa de penna de dono pertained to the Kings of Portugal, and with the intention of increase settlement King Sancho signed a foral in 1195 to recognize land claims of the local inhabitants and provided privileges to renegade knights.

In October 1217, a second foral was conferred by Afonso II, the Queen and his children: the Infantes Sancho and Afonso III, and Infanta Eleanor.

In 1321, during the reign of King Denis there existed three parochial churches in Penedono, to the invocation of São Pedro, São Salvador and Santa Maria Madalena. Over time the parish of Santa Maria Madalena was extinguished, and its lands divided into the remaining authorities. Similarly São Salvador, also, became extinct.

=== Monarchy ===
The last foral was donated to Pene de Dono during the reign of Manuel I of Portugal, undersigned by Fernão de Pina, on 27 November 1512. The land rents and rights of the crown at the time were set at 2$970 réis to be paid by the residents and municipality to the alcalde of the village castle. Of the sheep and goats that grazed in the lands without license, there was an obligation to pay one real per head, and in the case of cattle, 10 réis. Among the rights of the local authority, the alcalde had rights of portage and to cook bread.

During the 1527 population cadastral inventory of King John III, the municipality of Penedono included 486 homes and 1500 inhabitants. The most populous area of Antas, with 130 homes, followed by Castaínço (85), Beselga (82), Prova (78), Vila (73) and Alcarva (48); Antas represented almost a third of the resident population.

In 1708, Penedono was part of the comarca of Pinhel, divided between the ecclesiastical parishes of São Salvador and São Pedro, abbeys of the royal Padroado. The municipality included at that time its first Casa da Misericórdia, Hospital and five chapels, in addition to seven civil parishes: Granja, Castainço, Alcarva, Prova, Antas, Beselga and Ourozinho. At the time Pedro Álvares Cabral de Lacerda e Valadares, descendant of Fernando Afonso Correia, master of Farelães and Valadares, was the alcalde of the castle.

In the second half of the same century, Joaquim de Azevedo, abbey of Cedavim, composed his História Eclesiástica da cidade e Bispado de Lamego, now Penedono, to be transferred to the comarca of Trancoso. By decree on 23 December 1873, it magisterial rights were stripped, and municipal authority remained. In turn, in 1895 Penedono was extinguished on 7 September, to be restored on 13 January 1898, along with all pre-existing civil parishes.

== Geography ==
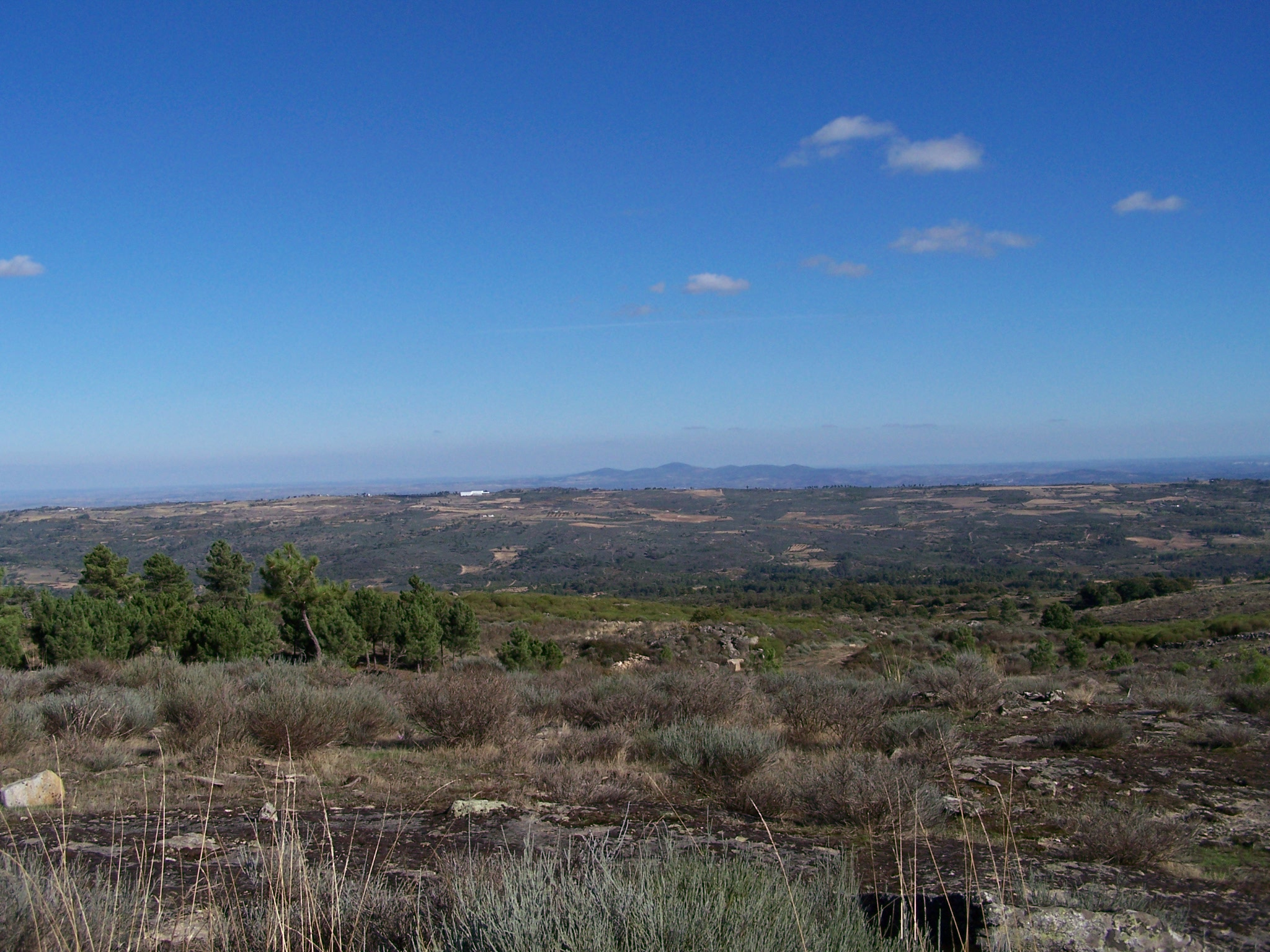
The landscape of Penedono in the area of Lameira de Cima

The municipality of Penedono is limited in the north by the municipality of São João da Pesqueira, east by Vila Nova de Foz Côa and Meda, south by Trancoso and west by Sernancelhe.

=== Human Geography ===
Population of Penedono (1849 - 2004)
Year	Pop.	±%
1801	3,672	—
1849	5,226	+42.3%
1900	6,876	+31.6%
1930	6,050	−12.0%
1960	6,792	+12.3%
1981	4,189	−38.3%
1991	3,731	−10.9%
2001	3,445	−7.7%
2011	2,952	−14.3%

Administratively, the municipality is divided into 7 civil parishes (freguesias):

- Antas e Ourozinho
- Beselga
- Castainço
- Penedono e Granja
- Penela da Beira
- Póvoa de Penela
- Souto

== Economy ==
The agricultural sector dominates this region; as such, the area is marked by rural activities, that occupy the fields of its inhabitants. Rye, corn and potato are the primary crops harvested in the fields, while other areas are covered in chestnut trees, vineyards, olive and almond orchards. In addition cattle-raising and dairying are important sectors of this economy.

== Notable citizens ==
- Álvaro Gonçalves Coutinho, (Wiki PT) (1383-1445) a knight, son Gonçalo Vasques Coutinho, 2nd Marshal of Portugal and brother of Vasco Fernandes Coutinho, 1st Count of Marialva, known as one of The Twelve of England, he was eternalized by Luís de Camões in his epic poem Os Lusíadas
