= Tabuaço =

- Municipality
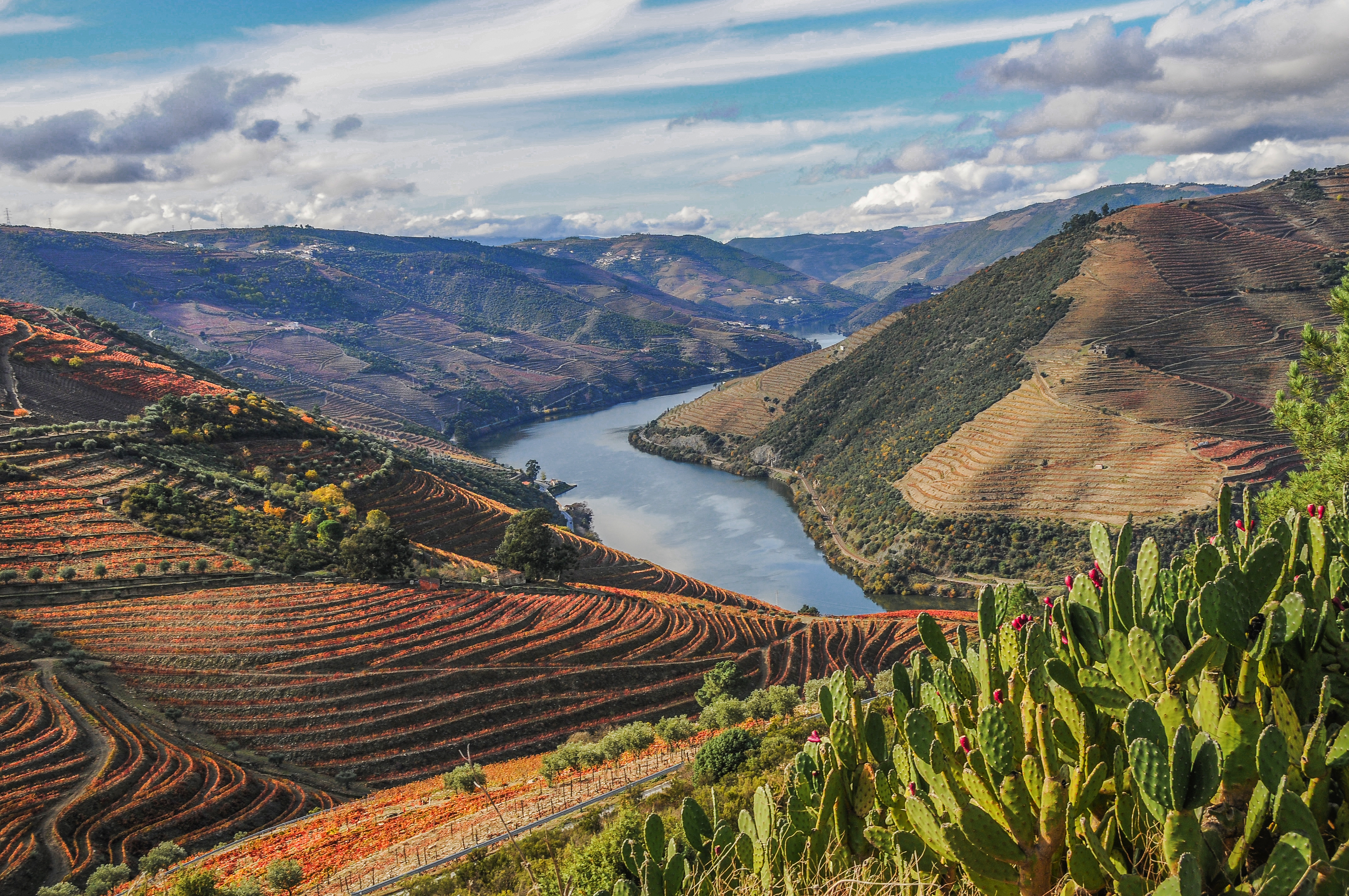
- View of Tabuaço

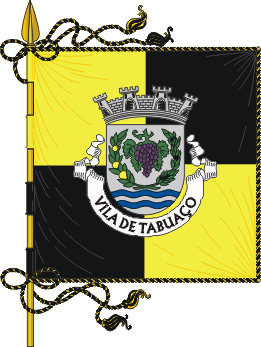
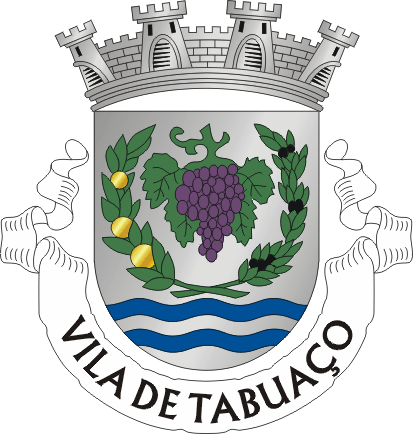
- Flag Coat of arms
- Interactive map of Tabuaço
- Coordinates: 41°06′N 7°34′W
- Country: Portugal
- Region: Norte
- Intermunic. comm.: Douro
- District: Viseu
- Parishes: 17

Government
  - President: Carlos Carvalho (PSD)

Area
  - Total: 133.86 km^{2} (51.68 sq mi)

Population (2011)
  - Total: 6,350
  - Density: 47.4/km^{2} (123/sq mi)
- Time zone: UTC+00:00 (WET)
  - Summer (DST): UTC+01:00 (WEST)
- Website: www.cm-tabuaco.pt

Tabuaço (European Portuguese pronunciation: [tɐβuˈasu]) is a municipality in the district Viseu in Portugal. The population in 2011 was 6,350, in an area of 133.86 km^{2}.

The present mayor is Dr. Carlos André Teles Paulo de Carvalho, elected by the Social Democratic Party (Portugal). The municipal holiday is June 24.

== Parishes ==
Administratively, the municipality is divided into 13 civil parishes (freguesias):

- Adorigo
- Arcos
- Barcos e Santa Leocádia
- Chavães
- Desejosa
- Granja do Tedo
- Longa
- Paradela e Granjinha
- Pinheiros e Vale de Figueira
- Sendim
- Tabuaço
- Távora e Pereiro
- Valença do Douro

== Notable people ==
- Abel Botelho (1855/56 – 1917) a Portuguese military officer, diplomat and a distinguished Naturalism writer
