= Nodeirinho =

- Village
- Interactive map of Nodeirinho
- Coordinates: 39°55′48″N 8°14′9″W
- Country: Portugal
- Distrito: Leiria
- Concelho: Pedrógão Grande
- Freguesia: Graça
- Elevation: 430 m (1,410 ft)

Nodeirinho is a Portuguese village, located in the civil parish of Graça, municipality of Pedrógão Grande. Located between the towns of Avelar and Pedrógão Grande to the north of the IC8 road, it was heavily affected by the 2017 Portugal wildfires.
