= D. Pedro V High School =

Coordinates: 38.741486°N 9.163371°W

D. Pedro V High School Escola Secundária D. Pedro V
- Estrada das Laranjeiras, 122; 1600 - 136 Lisbon; Portugal

Information
- Type: Public
- Motto: "Respondere, Auto Nomos, Civitas"
- Established: 1969
- Website: Official site

D. Pedro V High School (ESDPV – Portuguese: Escola Secundária D. Pedro V) is a public high school located in Lisbon, Portugal.

== History ==
=== General ===
The King D. Pedro V, son of the Queen D. Maria II, with the cognomen “The Educator”, had an impeccable and well-thought-out education. He rises to the throne at 18 years of age but spends the previous two years travelling abroad to complete his education. His reign was short, lasting only six years, but in that period he managed to bring a new dynamism to the Portuguese life. He devoted a large share of his time to problems related to education, which he considered crucial for the progress of the country.

He was considered a modern man for his ideas about education were well beyond his time.

In a letter written to the Minister of the Realm in 1860, D. Pedro V argues that the “reduction of the importance of the final exams constitutes an improvement that I would like to see extended to the superior education”. He also states that “the current legislation demands the justification of absence. This subject has been considered under the disciplinary point of view, wouldn’t it be more rational to consider it by the influence that the absences can have on the students’ grades?”.

These thoughts and doubts can be deemed very current since the Portuguese educational system is far from perfect and are in need of people with vision for the future.

Thus, in the school year of 1969/70, the Liceu Nacional D. Pedro V (National High School D.Pedro V) was inaugurated in his homage through the School Construction Plan. This high school, much like the man it is named after, as always been innovative, being also the first high school in Lisbon to adopt the pedagogic model of coeducation.

Today, the school is very different. More modern and better equipped, it includes four pavilions, physics, chemistry, biology and computer laboratories and a good resource center with library and computer room, always available for the 1300 students that attend it.

This school continues to distinguish itself by its great theater tradition, which is rare in most Portuguese schools. It offers drama as part of its school program and has assembled a talented drama group. The Drama Group performs three shows per year to the public (school community), one for each term. The topics of the show match the tests made in other subjects and the students are assessed that way. Besides those presentations the group is already a necessary presence in national school meetings.

Both the population and the government have understood the importance of education for the development and progress of the country, but King D. Pedro V was a visionary, understanding this in the 19th century. That was probably why he received the cognomen of “The Hopeful”, because he always hoped to do more than he could, a man well beyond his time.

D. Pedro V High School is located close to the American Embassy and provides a frequent opportunity in which to engage youth and teachers in supporting English language-learning and American culture.

The school's motto, inscribed in the logo, is: "Respondere, Auto Nomos, Civitas" which translates into English for "Accountability, Autonomy, Citizenship".

=== Events ===
- 1969/70 – First high school in Lisbon to adopt the new pedagogic model of coeducation
- 1979/80 – The school reaches the maximum number of students (around 5000)
- 1994/95 – Beginning of the "New Renovation"
- 1996/97 – Last year offering 3rd cycle of basic education during daytime
- 1997/98 – During the daytime, the school offers only secondary education, maintaining the 3rd cycle of basic education and secondary education in nocturnal classes
- 2003/04 – The offer of the 3rd cycle of basic education during the day resumes with four 7th grade classes
- 2004/05 – Beginning of the "New Renovation"

== Notable former students ==
This is an incomplete list of notable former students, in alphabetic order:

- André Cunha Leal, Antena 2 radio presenter
- Carla Lupi, actress
- Domingos Duarte Lima, lawyer and politician (also formally accused of a murder)
- Filipe Araújo, filmmaker
- Filipe Garcia Campos, musician, co-founder of Soulbizness
- Hélio Lopes Pestana, actor and model
- Hélio José Ribeiro Pinto, footballer
- João Manuel Correia Pires de Carvalho, actor, alderman, teacher
- João Cunha e Silva, former professional tennis player and tennis coach
- João Lopes Marques, writer and journalist
- João Diogo de Castro Nabais dos Santos, lawyer
- Manuel Henrique Tavares Fernandes, footballer
- Miguel Soares, photographer
- Maria Gil, actress and theatre director
- Neuza Silva, retired professional tennis player
- Paulo Costa, musician, founder of Ritual Tejo, Ar de Rock
- Pedro Camilo, musician, former Onda Choc member
- Pedro Teixeira Silva, musician, founder of Corvos

== See also ==
- Education in Portugal
- Dom Pedro
- Dom Pedro V Theatre
