= Seccia gens =

Ancient Roman family

The gens Seccia, Secia, or Siccia was a minor plebeian family at ancient Rome. Few members of this gens occur in history, but a number are known from inscriptions. The best known members include Lucius Siccius Dentatus, who won martial fame in the fifth century BC, and Gaius Secius Campanus suffect consul under Domitian.

== Origin ==
The nomen Seccius seems to be derived from the cognomen Secus. Chase classifies it among those gentilicia that either originated at Rome, or cannot be shown to have come from anywhere else. The surname Campanus, borne by the consul Secius, belongs to a class of cognomina derived from places of origin or residence, and indicates that at least some of this family claimed Campanian ancestry, or some other connection with that region of Italy.

== Praenomina ==
The main praenomina of the Seccii were Gaius, Gnaeus, Lucius, and Sextus, all of which were very common throughout Roman history.

== Branches and cognomina ==
There is no evidence that the Seccii were ever divided into distinct families. The surname Dentatus, borne by one of the earliest appearing in history, referred to someone with prominent teeth. The other cognomina of this gens occur largely in imperial times, when they used a great variety, some of which were the original names of freedmen who adopted Roman names upon their manumission. A large number of them bore the surname Secundus and its derivatives, Secundinus and Secundina, and the diminutive Secundilla, originally given to a second child. In its masculine form it is only found as a surname under the Republic, but the feminine form, Secunda, was a common praenomen among Roman women, and in imperial times the distinction between the name as a praenomen and a cognomen begins to blur.

== Members ==
This list includes abbreviated praenomina. For an explanation of this practice, see filiation.

- Seccia, the daughter of Cupitus, buried at Apulum in Dacia, aged sixty, with a monument from her husband and children.
- Seccia, named in an inscription from Aequum in Dalmatia.
- Seccia, the daughter of Sabinus, and mother of Saturninus, named in an inscription from Ovilava in Noricum, dating to AD 106.
- Siccia, named in an inscription from Pompeii in Campania.
- Secius, the son of Maximus, buried at Atrans in Noricum, aged nine.
- Seccius, a centurion serving in Britain.
- Seccius, the father of Acceptus, a man buried at Noreia in Noricum.
- Seccius, the father of Muso, father-in-law of Tiberius Claudius Uppius, and grandfather of Atticus Tutus and Quarta, named in a funerary inscription from Noreia.
- Seccius, the father of Seccia Secundina and Maximinus, named on his son's monument at Nemausus in Gallia Narbonensis.
- Seccius, the father of Vironica, named in an inscription from Atenor in Lusitania.
- Seccius, named in an inscription from Gallia Aquitania.
- Siccius, named in an inscription from Pompeii.
- Siccius, the son of Siccius Dexter and Junia Apra, named in a late second- or early third-century inscription from Fermum in Picenum.
- Secia L. f., named in an inscription from Caere in Etruria.
- Seccius C. f., named in an inscription from Mevania in Umbria, dating to the late first century BC.
- Gaius Siccius, named in an inscription from Pompeii.
- Publius Siccius T. f., one of the pontifices at Sutrium in Etruria, was appointed to fill the vacancy left by Quintus Fulvius.
- Gaius Seccius C. f. Aper, one of the duumviri jure dicundo at Aequum.
- Secia Apra, buried at Mevania.
- (Seccius) Arvernus, the son of Seccius, was an eques buried near Suessiones in Gallia Belgica.
- Gnaeus Seccius Auctus, named in an inscription from Aequum.
- Siccia Ɔ. l. Callistrate, a freedwoman named in an inscription from Rome, together with the freedman Marcus Siccius Callistratus, and Siccia Fausta, another freedwoman.
- Marcus Siccius M. l. Callistratus, a freedman named in an inscription from Rome, together with the freedwomen Siccia Callistrate and Siccia Fausta.
- Gaius Secius Campanus, consul suffectus in AD 86, served in place of the emperor Domitian from the Ides of January to the Kalends of either March or May.
- Seccius Corinthus, dedicated a tomb at Salona in Dalmatia for his wife, Valeria Valentina, aged thirty-five.
- Gaius Secius C. l. Corinthus, buried at Mogontiacum in Germania Superior, aged thirty.
- Gnaeus Seccius Crescens, named in an inscription from Aequum.
- Publius Siccius Crescens, dedicated a first-century tomb at Rome to his father, Quintus Servilius Pr[...].
- Seccia Cupita, the wife of Lucius Seccius Summus, and mother of Lucius Seccius Summus the younger, buried in the family sepulchre built by her son at Teurnia in Noricum.
- Gaius Siccius Datus, a native of Carthage, was a soldier in the second legion, stationed at Nicopolis in Egypt in AD 157, serving in the century of Antonius Nereus.
- Lucius Siccius Dentatus, a decorated soldier and tribune of the plebs in 454 BC; possibly should be Lucius Sicinius Dentatus.
- Siccius Dexter, the husband of Junia Apra, and father of Junius Dexter, Marcus Siccius Firmanus, and another son named Siccius, dedicated a late second- or early third-century tomb to his son, Firmanus, at Firmum.
- Gnaeus Seccius Diadumenus, named in an inscription from Aequum.
- Gnaeus Seccius Eutactiatus, buried at Rome.
- Sextus (Seccius) Evaristus, the son of Seccius, made a libationary offering to Minerva at Cammuni in Venetia and Histria.
- Siccia Ɔ. l. Fausta, a freedwoman named in an inscription from Rome, together with the freedman Marcus Siccius Callistratus, and another freedwoman, Siccia Callistrate.
- Gnaeus Seccius Felix, named in an inscription from Aequum.
- Marcus Siccius Firmanus, the son of Siccius Dexter and Junia Apra, buried in a late second- or early third-century tomb at Firmum, aged sixteen years, ten days.
- Secia Cn. l. Hospita, a freedwoman named in an inscription from Mevania.
- Secius Laturus, buried at the present site of Lara de los Infantes, formerly part of Hispania Tarraconensis.
- Gaius Seccius C. l. Lesbius, buried at Mogontiacum, aged twenty.
- Lucius Siccius Lucrio, dedicated a monument at Rome to Articuleia Horme, aged fourteen.
- Seccia Maxima, named in an inscription from Pompeii.
- (Seccius) Maximinus, the son of Seccius, buried at Nemausus with a monument from his sister, Seccia Secundina.
- Quintus Seccius Mercurius, built a tomb at Nemausus for his wife, Lucia Quinta.
- Gnaeus Seccius Mystes, named in an inscription from Aequum.
- Secia Placida, buried at Mevania, with a monument from her husband, Licinius Firmus.
- Secia Protogenia, buried at Nemausus, with a monument from her mother, Erotis.
- Seccia Pudentilla, the wife of Titus Naevienus Seneca, aedile and duumvir of the colony at Aequum, and mother of Naevienus Seneca and Pudentilla, dedicated a monument to her husband at Aequum.
- (Seccius) Saturninus, the son of Seccius, made a libationary offering at Samarobriva in Gallia Belgica.
- Siccia T. f. Secundilla, built a tomb at Ameria in Umbria, dating to the latter part of the first century AD, for herself, Gaius Lusius Strabo, a priest of Victoria, and Gaius Lusius Modestus, who had been one of the municipal duumvirs, military tribune, and a cavalry prefect.
- Seccia Secundina, the daughter of Seccius, dedicated a monument at Nemausus to her brother, Maximinus. Perhaps the same Seccia Secundina buried at Nemausus.
- Seccia Secundina, the daughter of the veteran Seccius Secundinus, buried in a family sepulchre at Lauriacum in Noricum.
- Seccius Secundinus, a veteran of the second legion, built a family sepulchre at Lauriacum for himself, his wife, Julia Severia, daughter, Seccia Secundina, son Julius Apricius, and grandsons Marius Maximus and Secundus.
- Siccius Secundus, named in a libationary inscription from Apta in Gallia Narbonensis.
- Quintus Secius Secundus, a native of Carthage, was one of the prefects of the Roman camp at Lambaesis in Numidia.
- Seccia Silvia, a freedwoman named in an inscription from Aequum.
- Seccia Silvia, the wife of Petilius Primus, and mother of Petilia Valentina, a girl buried at Clissa in Dalmatia, aged six years, eight months, and eighteen days.
- Lucius Seccius Summus, the husband of Seccia Cupita, and father of Lucius Seccius Summus the younger, buried in a family sepulchre built by his son at Teurnia.
- Lucius Seccius L. f. Summus, the son of Lucius Seccius Summus and Seccia Cupita, and husband of Junia Fusca, built a family sepulchre at Teurnia.
- Secia Verecunda, made a libationary offering to Jupiter Optimus Maximus at Mediolanum in Cisalpine Gaul.
- Gaius Seccius C. l. Verecundus, a freedman buried at Mogontiacum, aged twenty-five, with a monument from Romanus, his slave for twelve years.
- Seccius Victor, named in an inscription from Iuvavum in Noricum.
- Marcus Siccius Victor, buried at Thugga in Africa Proconsularis, aged forty-five.

== See also ==
- List of Roman gentes

== Bibliography ==
- Dionysius of Halicarnassus, Romaike Archaiologia (Roman Antiquities).
- Theodor Mommsen et alii, Corpus Inscriptionum Latinarum (The Body of Latin Inscriptions, abbreviated CIL), Berlin-Brandenburgische Akademie der Wissenschaften (1853–present).
- Notizie degli Scavi di Antichità (News of Excavations from Antiquity, abbreviated NSA), Accademia dei Lincei (1876–present).
- René Cagnat et alii, L'Année épigraphique (The Year in Epigraphy, abbreviated AE), Presses Universitaires de France (1888–present).
- George Davis Chase, "The Origin of Roman Praenomina", in Harvard Studies in Classical Philology, vol. VIII, pp. 103–184 (1897).
- Paul von Rohden, Elimar Klebs, & Hermann Dessau, Prosopographia Imperii Romani (The Prosopography of the Roman Empire, abbreviated PIR), Berlin (1898).
- La Carte Archéologique de la Gaule (Archaeological Map of Gaul, abbreviated CAG), Académie des Inscriptions et Belles-Lettres (1931–present).
- Anna and Jaroslav Šašel, Inscriptiones Latinae quae in Iugoslavia inter annos MCMXL et MCMLX repertae et editae sunt (Inscriptions from Yugoslavia Found and Published between 1940 and 1960, abbreviated ILJug), Ljubljana (1963–1986).
- José A. Abásolo, Epigrafia Romana de la Region de Lara de los Infantes (Roman Inscriptions from the Area around Lara de los Infantes), Burgos (1974).
- T. Robert S. Broughton, The Magistrates of the Roman Republic, American Philological Association (1952–1986).
- Inscriptionum Lapidarium Latinarum Provinciae Norici usque ad annum MCMLXXXIV repertarum indices (Index of Latin Inscriptions in Stone from the Province of Noricum up to the Year 1986), Berlin (1986).
- The Roman Inscriptions of Britain (abbreviated RIB), Oxford, (1990–present).
- L. Sensi, Museo Comunale di San Francesco a Montefalco, Perugia (1990).
- Anamarija Kurilić, "Recent Epigraphic Finds from the Roman Province of Dalmatia", in Dalmatia: Research in the Roman Province, 1970–2001, David Davison, Vincent Gaffney, & Emilio Marin, eds., Oxford (2006), pp. 133–147.
