= Jorge Gomes (politician) =

Portuguese businessman and manager (born 1951)

His Excellency Jorge Gomes

Secretary of State of Internal Administration
- Incumbent
- Assumed office 26 November 2015
- Prime Minister: António Costa; Answers to Minister Constança Urbano de Sousa
- Preceded by: João Almeida

Personal details
- Born: 28 October 1951 (age 74) Bragança, Portugal
- Party: Socialist Party
- Website: Secretary of State of Internal Administration

Jorge Manuel Nogueiro Gomes (born 18 October 1951) is a Portuguese businessman and manager and the country's current Secretary of State of Internal Administration, under Minister Constança Urbano de Sousa.

== Professional career ==
Formerly a bakery owner in Sendim, he later moved to Bragança, where he ran an informatics company. He directed several institutions in the Bragança District, namely commercial and instrustial associations, and he was also a member of the General Council of the Bragança Polytechnic Institute.

He was named Civil Governor of Bragança between 2005 and 2011, at which time he met António Costa, then Minister of Internal Administration. He ran for Mayor of Bragança twice, but lost, and ended up serving as alderman.

After Costa became the leader of the Socialist Party, he was chosen as National Secretary for the Organisation, President of the Districtual Federation, and Member of the National Commission of the Party.

He was elected as a Socialist Member of Parliament for the Bragança constituency in the Portuguese legislative election, 2015, but later that same year was made Secretary of State of Internal Administration.

He rose to notoriety during the 2017 Portugal wildfires, due to his near-constant presence in the operations center by the fire fronts. One of the first authorities on the scene, he regretted being "the bearer of ever-worsening news" as he updated the journalists on the rising death toll. When President Marcelo Rebelo de Sousa arrived, the two were visibly shaken and shared a long hug.

== Personal life ==
He is married and has two daughters. In the 1980s, while living in Sendim, Miranda do Douro, a fire broke out in his house and he rescued his daughters from the fire himself.
