= Bragança (Assembly of the Republic constituency) =

Constituency of the Assembly of the Republic, the national legislature of Portugal

- Constituency for the Assembly of the Republic
- Location of Bragança within Portugal
- District: Bragança
- Population: 122,360 (2024)
- Electorate: 132,758 (2025)
- Area: 6,599 km^{2} (2024)

Current Constituency
- Created: 1976
- Seats: List: 3 (2009–present); 4 (1979–2009); 5 (1976–1979)
- Deputies: List: Hernâni Dias (PSD); Nuno Jorge Gonçalves (PSD); Júlia Rodrigues (PS)

Bragança is one of the 22 multi-member constituencies of the Assembly of the Republic, the national legislature of Portugal. The constituency was established in 1976 when the Assembly of the Republic was established by the constitution following the restoration of democracy. It is conterminous with the district of Bragança. The constituency currently elects three of the 230 members of the Assembly of the Republic using the closed party-list proportional representation electoral system. At the 2025 legislative election it had 132,758 registered electors.

== Electoral system ==
Bragança currently elects three of the 230 members of the Assembly of the Republic using the closed party-list proportional representation electoral system. Seats are allocated using the D'Hondt method.

== Election results ==
=== Summary ===
Election	Unitary Democrats CDU / APU / PCP			Left Bloc BE / UDP			LIVRE L			Socialists PS / FRS			People Animals Nature PAN			Democratic Renewal PRD			Social Democrats PSD / PàF / AD / PPD			Liberals IL			CDS – People's CDS–PP / CDS			Chega CH / PPV/CDC / PPV		
Election	Votes	%	Seats	Votes	%	Seats	Votes	%	Seats	Votes	%	Seats	Votes	%	Seats	Votes	%	Seats	Votes	%	Seats	Votes	%	Seats	Votes	%	Seats	Votes	%	Seats
2025	725	1.06%	0	590	0.87%	0	793	1.16%	0	17,785	26.08%	1	455	0.67%	0				30,628	44.90%	2	1,541	2.26%	0				14,290	20.95%	0
2024	774	1.09%	0	1,403	1.98%	0	727	1.03%	0	21,539	30.42%	1	598	0.84%	0				29,069	41.05%	2	1,241	1.75%	0				13,220	18.67%	0
2022	893	1.39%	0	1,370	2.13%	0	227	0.35%	0	26,504	41.17%	2	399	0.62%	0				26,492	41.15%	1	1,049	1.63%	0	1,373	2.13%	0	5,610	8.71%	0
2019	1,350	2.22%	0	3,835	6.30%	0	270	0.44%	0	23,216	38.16%	1	830	1.36%	0				25,938	42.64%	2	271	0.45%	0	2,835	4.66%	0	531	0.87%	0
2015	2,134	3.19%	0	3,864	5.78%	0	252	0.38%	0	23,518	35.21%	1	383	0.57%	0				34,347	51.42%	2									
2011	1,956	2.68%	0	1,732	2.37%	0				19,728	26.99%	1							39,338	53.82%	2				8,378	11.46%	0			
2009	2,020	2.48%	0	5,180	6.36%	0				27,654	33.97%	1							34,084	41.87%	2				10,541	12.95%	0	100	0.12%	0
2005	1,679	2.10%	0	2,044	2.55%	0				34,699	43.31%	2							32,129	40.10%	2				7,964	9.94%	0			
2002	1,564	1.88%	0	789	0.95%	0				25,357	30.56%	1							45,070	54.31%	3				9,213	11.10%	0			
1999	2,160	2.67%	0	695	0.86%	0				32,715	40.43%	2							37,130	45.88%	2				7,131	8.81%	0			
1995	1,746	1.97%	0	389	0.44%	0				36,532	41.22%	2							40,581	45.79%	2				8,493	9.58%	0			
1991	1,888	2.13%	0							23,300	26.31%	1				539	0.61%	0	52,608	59.40%	3				7,452	8.41%	0			
1987	3,015	3.36%	0	639	0.71%	0				17,817	19.86%	1				1,161	1.29%	0	56,467	62.95%	3				7,041	7.85%	0			
1985	4,883	5.53%	0	796	0.90%	0				20,852	23.59%	1				6,323	7.15%	0	36,037	40.78%	2				15,773	17.85%	1			
1983	4,415	4.96%	0	457	0.51%	0				28,185	31.67%	1							33,196	37.30%	2				19,382	21.78%	1			
1980	4,941	4.96%	0	977	0.98%	0				21,905	21.98%	1							67,153	67.40%	3									
1979	6,062	5.99%	0	1,944	1.92%	0				23,346	23.07%	1							63,842	63.08%	3									
1976	2,530	2.86%	0	768	0.87%	0				21,514	24.34%	1							31,636	35.79%	2				26,927	30.46%	2			

(Figures in italics represent alliances.)

=== Detailed ===
==== 2020s ====
===== 2025 =====
Results of the 2025 legislative election held on 18 May 2025:

Party		Votes	%	Seats
Democratic Alliance	AD	30,628	44.90%	2
Socialist Party	PS	17,785	26.08%	1
Chega	CH	14,290	20.95%	0
Liberal Initiative	IL	1,541	2.26%	0
National Democratic Alternative	ADN	1,071	1.57%	0
LIVRE	L	793	1.16%	0
Unitary Democratic Coalition	CDU	725	1.06%	0
Left Bloc	BE	590	0.87%	0
People Animals Nature	PAN	455	0.67%	0
React, Include, Recycle	RIR	97	0.14%	0
Volt Portugal	Volt	86	0.13%	0
Ergue-te	E	80	0.12%	0
People's Monarchist Party	PPM	66	0.10%	0
Valid votes		68,207	100.00%	3
Blank votes		853	1.22%	
Rejected votes – other		923	1.32%	
Total polled		69,983	52.71%	
Registered electors		132,758		

The following candidates were elected:: Hernâni Dias (AD); Nuno Jorge Gonçalves (AD); and Júlia Rodrigues (PS).

===== 2024 =====
Results of the 2024 legislative election held on 10 March 2024:

Party		Votes	%	Seats
Democratic Alliance	AD	29,069	41.05%	2
Socialist Party	PS	21,539	30.42%	1
Chega	CH	13,220	18.67%	0
National Democratic Alternative	ADN	1,576	2.23%	0
Left Bloc	BE	1,403	1.98%	0
Liberal Initiative	IL	1,241	1.75%	0
Unitary Democratic Coalition	CDU	774	1.09%	0
LIVRE	L	727	1.03%	0
People Animals Nature	PAN	598	0.84%	0
New Right	ND	328	0.46%	0
React, Include, Recycle	RIR	169	0.24%	0
Ergue-te	E	109	0.15%	0
Alternative 21 (Earth Party and Alliance)	PT-A	53	0.07%	0
Valid votes		70,806	100.00%	3
Blank votes		892	1.23%	
Rejected votes – other		966	1.33%	
Total polled		72,664	54.14%	
Registered electors		134,213		

The following candidates were elected: Hernâni Dias (AD); Isabel Ferreira (PS); and Nuno Jorge Gonçalves (AD).

===== 2022 =====
Results of the 2022 legislative election held on 30 January 2022:

Party		Votes	%	Seats
Socialist Party	PS	26,504	41.17%	2
Social Democratic Party	PSD	26,492	41.15%	1
Chega	CH	5,610	8.71%	0
CDS – People's Party	CDS–PP	1,373	2.13%	0
Left Bloc	BE	1,370	2.13%	0
Liberal Initiative	IL	1,049	1.63%	0
Unitary Democratic Coalition	CDU	893	1.39%	0
People Animals Nature	PAN	399	0.62%	0
React, Include, Recycle	RIR	251	0.39%	0
LIVRE	L	227	0.35%	0
Earth Party	PT	90	0.14%	0
Ergue-te	E	64	0.10%	0
Socialist Alternative Movement	MAS	54	0.08%	0
Valid votes		64,376	100.00%	3
Blank votes		567	0.86%	
Rejected votes – other		795	1.21%	
Total polled		65,738	47.78%	
Registered electors		137,572		

The following candidates were elected: Berta Nunes (PS); Adão Silva (PSD); and Sobrinho Teixeira (PS).

==== 2010s ====
===== 2019 =====
Results of the 2019 legislative election held on 6 October 2019:

Party		Votes	%	Seats
Social Democratic Party	PSD	25,938	42.64%	2
Socialist Party	PS	23,216	38.16%	1
Left Bloc	BE	3,835	6.30%	0
CDS – People's Party	CDS–PP	2,835	4.66%	0
Unitary Democratic Coalition	CDU	1,350	2.22%	0
People Animals Nature	PAN	830	1.36%	0
Chega	CH	531	0.87%	0
React, Include, Recycle	RIR	355	0.58%	0
Portuguese Workers' Communist Party	PCTP	313	0.51%	0
Alliance	A	310	0.51%	0
Liberal Initiative	IL	271	0.45%	0
LIVRE	L	270	0.44%	0
United Party of Retirees and Pensioners	PURP	187	0.31%	0
National Renewal Party	PNR	158	0.26%	0
We, the Citizens!	NC	138	0.23%	0
Democratic Republican Party	PDR	119	0.20%	0
Portuguese Labour Party	PTP	101	0.17%	0
People's Monarchist Party	PPM	77	0.13%	0
Valid votes		60,834	100.00%	3
Blank votes		1,305	2.05%	
Rejected votes – other		1,392	2.19%	
Total polled		63,531	44.88%	
Registered electors		141,557		

The following candidates were elected: Jorge Gomes (PS); Isabel Lopes (PSD); and Adão Silva (PSD).

===== 2015 =====
Results of the 2015 legislative election held on 4 October 2015:

Party		Votes	%	Seats
Portugal Ahead	PàF	34,347	51.42%	2
Socialist Party	PS	23,518	35.21%	1
Left Bloc	BE	3,864	5.78%	0
Unitary Democratic Coalition	CDU	2,134	3.19%	0
Democratic Republican Party	PDR	550	0.82%	0
Portuguese Workers' Communist Party	PCTP	534	0.80%	0
People Animals Nature	PAN	383	0.57%	0
ACT! (Portuguese Labour Party and Socialist Alternative Movement)	AGIR	285	0.43%	0
LIVRE	L	252	0.38%	0
People's Monarchist Party	PPM	232	0.35%	0
The Earth Party Movement	MPT	221	0.33%	0
National Renewal Party	PNR	190	0.28%	0
We, the Citizens!	NC	161	0.24%	0
Together for the People	JPP	123	0.18%	0
Valid votes		66,794	100.00%	3
Blank votes		1,189	1.71%	
Rejected votes – other		1,409	2.03%	
Total polled		69,392	47.08%	
Registered electors		147,395		

The following candidates were elected: Jorge Gomes (PS); Adão Silva (PàF); and José Silvano (PàF).

===== 2011 =====
Results of the 2011 legislative election held on 5 June 2011:

Party		Votes	%	Seats
Social Democratic Party	PSD	39,338	53.82%	2
Socialist Party	PS	19,728	26.99%	1
CDS – People's Party	CDS–PP	8,378	11.46%	0
Unitary Democratic Coalition	CDU	1,956	2.68%	0
Left Bloc	BE	1,732	2.37%	0
Portuguese Workers' Communist Party	PCTP	417	0.57%	0
Humanist Party	PH	304	0.42%	0
The Earth Party Movement	MPT	282	0.39%	0
People's Monarchist Party	PPM	247	0.34%	0
Hope for Portugal Movement	MEP	224	0.31%	0
Portuguese Labour Party	PTP	175	0.24%	0
National Renewal Party	PNR	165	0.23%	0
Democratic Party of the Atlantic	PDA	146	0.20%	0
Valid votes		73,092	100.00%	3
Blank votes		1,436	1.90%	
Rejected votes – other		1,045	1.38%	
Total polled		75,573	49.45%	
Registered electors		152,840		

The following candidates were elected: Mota Andrade (PS); Adão Silva (PSD); and Francisco José Viegas (PSD).

==== 2000s ====
===== 2009 =====
Results of the 2009 legislative election held on 27 September 2009:

Party		Votes	%	Seats
Social Democratic Party	PSD	34,084	41.87%	2
Socialist Party	PS	27,654	33.97%	1
CDS – People's Party	CDS–PP	10,541	12.95%	0
Left Bloc	BE	5,180	6.36%	0
Unitary Democratic Coalition	CDU	2,020	2.48%	0
Portuguese Workers' Communist Party	PCTP	529	0.65%	0
Hope for Portugal Movement	MEP	322	0.40%	0
New Democracy Party	ND	302	0.37%	0
Merit and Society Movement	MMS	193	0.24%	0
People's Monarchist Party	PPM	188	0.23%	0
The Earth Party Movement and Humanist Party	MPT-PH	158	0.19%	0
National Renewal Party	PNR	132	0.16%	0
Pro-Life Party	PPV	100	0.12%	0
Valid votes		81,403	100.00%	3
Blank votes		1,052	1.25%	
Rejected votes – other		1,415	1.69%	
Total polled		83,870	53.18%	
Registered electors		157,699		

The following candidates were elected: Mota Andrade (PS); José Ferreira Gomes (PSD); and Adão Silva (PSD).

===== 2005 =====
Results of the 2005 legislative election held on 20 February 2005:

Party		Votes	%	Seats
Socialist Party	PS	34,699	43.31%	2
Social Democratic Party	PSD	32,129	40.10%	2
CDS – People's Party	CDS–PP	7,964	9.94%	0
Left Bloc	BE	2,044	2.55%	0
Unitary Democratic Coalition	CDU	1,679	2.10%	0
New Democracy Party	ND	623	0.78%	0
Portuguese Workers' Communist Party	PCTP	456	0.57%	0
Humanist Party	PH	264	0.33%	0
National Renewal Party	PNR	257	0.32%	0
Valid votes		80,115	100.00%	4
Blank votes		1,202	1.46%	
Rejected votes – other		1,137	1.38%	
Total polled		82,454	55.40%	
Registered electors		148,823		

The following candidates were elected: Mota Andrade (PS); Duarte Lima (PSD); Adão Silva (PSD); and Luís Vaz (PS).

===== 2002 =====
Results of the 2002 legislative election held on 17 March 2002:

Party		Votes	%	Seats
Social Democratic Party	PSD	45,070	54.31%	3
Socialist Party	PS	25,357	30.56%	1
CDS – People's Party	CDS–PP	9,213	11.10%	0
Unitary Democratic Coalition	CDU	1,564	1.88%	0
Left Bloc	BE	789	0.95%	0
Portuguese Workers' Communist Party	PCTP	393	0.47%	0
Humanist Party	PH	368	0.44%	0
The Earth Party Movement	MPT	231	0.28%	0
Valid votes		82,985	100.00%	4
Blank votes		559	0.66%	
Rejected votes – other		1,104	1.30%	
Total polled		84,648	56.04%	
Registered electors		151,057		

The following candidates were elected: José Manuel Pavão (PSD); Machado Rodrigues (PSD); Adão Silva (PSD); and Armando Vara (PS).

==== 1990s ====
===== 1999 =====
Results of the 1999 legislative election held on 10 October 1999:

Party		Votes	%	Seats
Social Democratic Party	PSD	37,130	45.88%	2
Socialist Party	PS	32,715	40.43%	2
CDS – People's Party	CDS–PP	7,131	8.81%	0
Unitary Democratic Coalition	CDU	2,160	2.67%	0
Left Bloc	BE	695	0.86%	0
Portuguese Workers' Communist Party	PCTP	537	0.66%	0
The Earth Party Movement	MPT	314	0.39%	0
National Solidarity Party	PSN	240	0.30%	0
Valid votes		80,922	100.00%	4
Blank votes		711	0.86%	
Rejected votes – other		697	0.85%	
Total polled		82,330	54.45%	
Registered electors		151,203		

The following candidates were elected: Mota Andrade (PS); Machado Rodrigues (PSD); Adão Silva (PSD); and Armando Vara (PS).

===== 1995 =====
Results of the 1995 legislative election held on 1 October 1995:

Party		Votes	%	Seats
Social Democratic Party	PSD	40,581	45.79%	2
Socialist Party	PS	36,532	41.22%	2
CDS – People's Party	CDS–PP	8,493	9.58%	0
Unitary Democratic Coalition	CDU	1,746	1.97%	0
Revolutionary Socialist Party	PSR	490	0.55%	0
Portuguese Workers' Communist Party	PCTP	400	0.45%	0
Popular Democratic Union	UDP	389	0.44%	0
Valid votes		88,631	100.00%	4
Blank votes		610	0.67%	
Rejected votes – other		1,362	1.50%	
Total polled		90,603	58.66%	
Registered electors		154,459		

The following candidates were elected: José Gama (PSD); Júlio Meirinhos (PS); Cruz Oliveira (PSD); and Armando Vara (PS).

===== 1991 =====
Results of the 1991 legislative election held on 6 October 1991:

Party		Votes	%	Seats
Social Democratic Party	PSD	52,608	59.40%	3
Socialist Party	PS	23,300	26.31%	1
Social Democratic Centre Party	CDS	7,452	8.41%	0
Unitary Democratic Coalition	CDU	1,888	2.13%	0
National Solidarity Party	PSN	1,392	1.57%	0
Democratic Renewal Party	PRD	539	0.61%	0
Portuguese Workers' Communist Party	PCTP	528	0.60%	0
People's Monarchist Party	PPM	430	0.49%	0
Revolutionary Socialist Party	PSR	424	0.48%	0
Valid votes		88,561	100.00%	4
Blank votes		666	0.73%	
Rejected votes – other		1,573	1.73%	
Total polled		90,800	60.58%	
Registered electors		149,875		

The following candidates were elected: Duarte Lima (PSD); Telmo Moreno (PSD); Silva Peneda (PSD); and Armando Vara (PS).

==== 1980s ====
===== 1987 =====
Results of the 1987 legislative election held on 19 July 1987:

Party		Votes	%	Seats
Social Democratic Party	PSD	56,467	62.95%	3
Socialist Party	PS	17,817	19.86%	1
Social Democratic Centre Party	CDS	7,041	7.85%	0
Unitary Democratic Coalition	CDU	3,015	3.36%	0
Democratic Renewal Party	PRD	1,161	1.29%	0
Christian Democratic Party	PDC	1,101	1.23%	0
Revolutionary Socialist Party	PSR	771	0.86%	0
Popular Democratic Union	UDP	639	0.71%	0
Communist Party (Reconstructed)	PC(R)	531	0.59%	0
People's Monarchist Party	PPM	460	0.51%	0
Portuguese Democratic Movement	MDP	413	0.46%	0
Portuguese Workers' Communist Party	PCTP	289	0.32%	0
Valid votes		89,705	100.00%	4
Blank votes		945	1.02%	
Rejected votes – other		2,298	2.47%	
Total polled		92,948	65.16%	
Registered electors		142,649		

The following candidates were elected: Abílio Costa (PSD); Duarte Lima (PSD); Silva Peneda (PSD); and Armando Vara (PS).

===== 1985 =====
Results of the 1985 legislative election held on 6 October 1985:

Party		Votes	%	Seats
Social Democratic Party	PSD	36,037	40.78%	2
Socialist Party	PS	20,852	23.59%	1
Social Democratic Centre Party	CDS	15,773	17.85%	1
Democratic Renewal Party	PRD	6,323	7.15%	0
United People Alliance	APU	4,883	5.53%	0
Christian Democratic Party	PDC	1,485	1.68%	0
Revolutionary Socialist Party	PSR	833	0.94%	0
Popular Democratic Union	UDP	796	0.90%	0
Workers' Party of Socialist Unity	POUS	487	0.55%	0
Communist Party (Reconstructed)	PC(R)	463	0.52%	0
Portuguese Workers' Communist Party	PCTP	445	0.50%	0
Valid votes		88,377	100.00%	4
Blank votes		963	1.05%	
Rejected votes – other		2,696	2.93%	
Total polled		92,036	65.38%	
Registered electors		140,771		

The following candidates were elected: Duarte Lima (PSD); Hernâni Moutinho (CDS); Amadeu Pires (PS); and Casimiro Pires (PSD).

===== 1983 =====
Results of the 1983 legislative election held on 25 April 1983:

Party		Votes	%	Seats
Social Democratic Party	PSD	33,196	37.30%	2
Socialist Party	PS	28,185	31.67%	1
Social Democratic Centre Party	CDS	19,382	21.78%	1
United People Alliance	APU	4,415	4.96%	0
Christian Democratic Party	PDC	932	1.05%	0
People's Monarchist Party	PPM	733	0.82%	0
Revolutionary Socialist Party	PSR	484	0.54%	0
Popular Democratic Union	UDP	457	0.51%	0
Socialist Workers League	LST	425	0.48%	0
Portuguese Workers' Communist Party	PCTP	381	0.43%	0
Workers' Party of Socialist Unity	POUS	227	0.26%	0
Portuguese Marxist–Leninist Communist Organization	OCMLP	175	0.20%	0
Valid votes		88,992	100.00%	4
Blank votes		1,010	1.09%	
Rejected votes – other		2,776	2.99%	
Total polled		92,778	70.04%	
Registered electors		132,455		

The following candidates were elected: Duarte Lima (PSD); Hernâni Moutinho (CDS); Amadeu Pires (PS); and Casimiro Pires (PSD).

===== 1980 =====
Results of the 1980 legislative election held on 5 October 1980:

Party		Votes	%	Seats
Democratic Alliance	AD	67,153	67.40%	3
Republican and Socialist Front	FRS	21,905	21.98%	1
United People Alliance	APU	4,941	4.96%	0
Revolutionary Socialist Party	PSR	1,173	1.18%	0
Workers' Party of Socialist Unity	POUS	1,159	1.16%	0
Popular Democratic Union	UDP	977	0.98%	0
Labour Party	PT	838	0.84%	0
Christian Democratic Party, Independent Movement for the National Reconstruction / Party of the Portuguese Right and National Front	PDC- MIRN/ PDP- FN	773	0.78%	0
Portuguese Workers' Communist Party	PCTP	718	0.72%	0
Valid votes		99,637	100.00%	4
Blank votes		619	0.60%	
Rejected votes – other		2,587	2.52%	
Total polled		102,843	80.08%	
Registered electors		128,428		

The following candidates were elected: Eleutério Alves (AD); Adriano Moreira (AD); Casimiro Pires (AD); and Manuel Bragança Tender (FRS).

==== 1970s ====
===== 1979 =====
Results of the 1979 legislative election held on 2 December 1979:

Party		Votes	%	Seats
Democratic Alliance	AD	63,842	63.08%	3
Socialist Party	PS	23,346	23.07%	1
United People Alliance	APU	6,062	5.99%	0
Christian Democratic Party	PDC	3,245	3.21%	0
Popular Democratic Union	UDP	1,944	1.92%	0
Revolutionary Socialist Party	PSR	1,126	1.11%	0
Portuguese Workers' Communist Party	PCTP	1,092	1.08%	0
Left-wing Union for the Socialist Democracy	UEDS	556	0.55%	0
Valid votes		101,213	100.00%	4
Blank votes		809	0.77%	
Rejected votes – other		3,198	3.04%	
Total polled		105,220	84.02%	
Registered electors		125,225		

The following candidates were elected: Eleutério Alves (AD); Casimiro Pires (AD); João Porto (AD); and Manuel Bragança Tender (PS).

===== 1976 =====
Results of the 1976 legislative election held on 25 April 1976:

Party		Votes	%	Seats
Democratic People's Party	PPD	31,636	35.79%	2
Social Democratic Centre Party	CDS	26,927	30.46%	2
Socialist Party	PS	21,514	24.34%	1
Portuguese Communist Party	PCP	2,530	2.86%	0
People's Socialist Front	FSP	1,003	1.13%	0
Christian Democratic Party	PDC	812	0.92%	0
Popular Democratic Union	UDP	768	0.87%	0
People's Monarchist Party	PPM	739	0.84%	0
Worker–Peasant Alliance	AOC	626	0.71%	0
Re-Organized Movement of the Party of the Proletariat	MRPP	581	0.66%	0
Communist Party of Portugal (Marxist–Leninist)	PCP(ML)	511	0.58%	0
Movement of Socialist Left	MES	411	0.46%	0
Internationalist Communist League	LCI	341	0.39%	0
Valid votes		88,399	100.00%	5
Rejected votes		6,745	7.09%	
Total polled		95,144	77.37%	
Registered electors		122,980		

The following candidates were elected: Costa Andrade (PPD); António Barroso Gomes (PS); António Augusto Gonçalves (PPD); Rui Marrana (CDS); and Luis Ramires (CDS).
