= Isabel Ferreira (politician) =

Portuguese scientist and politician (born 1974)

Isabel Cristina Fernandes Rodrigues Ferreira

Member of the Assembly of the Republic
- In office 26 March 2024 – 18 May 2025
- Constituency: Bragança

Secretary of State for Regional Development
- In office March 2022 – April 2024

Secretary of State for Upgrading the Interior
- In office October 2019 – March 2022

Personal details
- Born: 2 January 1974 (age 52) Nampula, Portuguese Mozambique
- Party: Independent
- Education: University of Porto; University of Minho

Isabel Cristina Fernandes Rodrigues Ferreira (born 1974) is a Portuguese scientist specialising in the agri-food sector, and a politician. Between 2019 and 2022 she was Secretary of State for Upgrading the Interior and between 2022 and 2024, she was Secretary of State for Regional Development. In the March 2024 national election she was elected to the Portuguese Assembly of the Republic to represent Bragança.

== Early life ==
Ferreira was born on 2 January 1974, in Nampula in Portuguese Mozambique. Her family moved to Bragança in Portugal when she was eleven months old. She obtained a degree in biochemistry from the Faculty of Sciences of the University of Porto and a master's degree and PhD in chemistry from the Faculty of Sciences of the University of Minho.

== Academic career ==
Ferreira is a principal coordinating professor at the Polytechnic Institute of Bragança. She has also served as vice-president of the institute and as director of the Mountain Research Centre of the institute and a mentor at the Mountains Research Collaborative Laboratory (MORE). Her extensive research has led to the publication of 60 book chapters and more than 600 scientific articles. She also has several patents to her name, mainly resulting from technology transfer to industry.

Ferreira has been president of the Scientific Council of Natural and Environmental Sciences of the Portuguese Foundation for Science and Technology (FCT). She has been editor-in-chief of the natural and artificial antioxidants section of Antioxidants, associate editor of Food & Function, a journal of the Royal Society of Chemistry, and has been on the editorial board of Food and Chemical Toxicology, among others.

== Political career ==
In 2019, Ferreira was appointed as Secretary of State for Upgrading the Interior within the newly created Ministry of Territorial Cohesion, as an independent in the government formed by the Socialist Party (PS) under prime minister António Costa. After the 2022 election the name was changed to Secretary of State for Regional Development. The main headquarters of her department was decentralized and located in Bragança, as an indication of the commitment of the Portuguese government to try to overcome depopulation in mountainous and other rural areas. In working to achieve this she collaborated closely with neighbouring areas in Spain that face similar problems.

Following the defeat of the PS in the 2024 election, Ferreira ceased to be a secretary of state. However, she had been nominated at the top of the list of PS candidates for the Bragança constituency and was elected to the national assembly, as the only PS representative in the three-seat constituency.

== Awards and honours ==
Awards received by Ferreira have included:

- 2019 – Winner of the European Social Innovation Award
- 2017 – Awarded with the Medal of Merit from the Municipality of Bragança.
- 2016 – Distinguished by the National Agency for Scientific and Technological Culture, in the book Mulheres na Ciência (Women in Science).
- 2014 – Winner of the Horticultural Operational and Technological Centre (COTHN) award for R&D and Innovation
- 2001 – Winner of the Gulbenkian Prize for Stimulating Scientific Research
