= June 2017 Portugal wildfires =

Four deadly fires in Leiria, Portugal

June 2017 Portugal Central wildfires
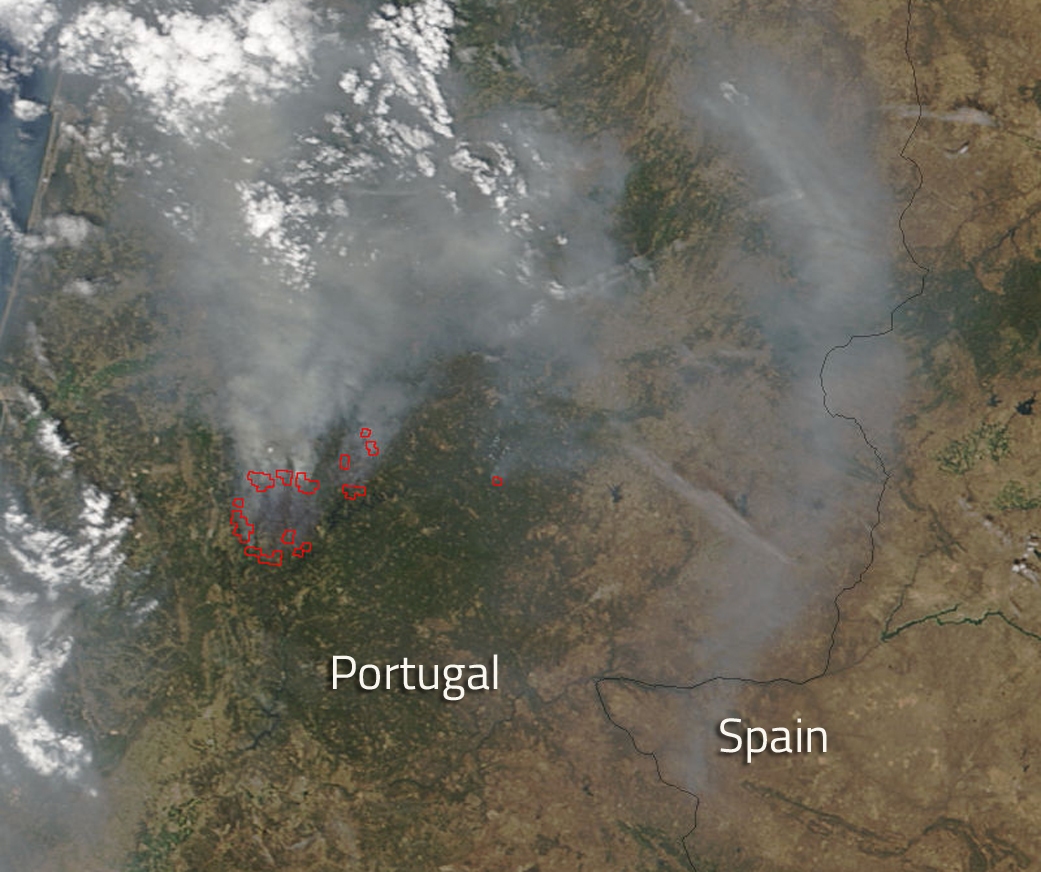
- MODIS/NASA satellite image of the fires of Castanheira de Pera and Pedrógão Grande and associated smoke plumes drifting into Northern Portugal and Spain on 18 June
- Date: 17–24 June 2017
- Location: Castanheira de Pera and Pedrógão Grande, Leiria, Portugal
- Coordinates: 39°56′58″N 08°14′44″W

Statistics
- Total fires: 156 total
- Total area: 44,969 hectares (111,120 acres) as of 20 June

Impacts
- Deaths: 66 confirmed
- Injuries: 204 confirmed (7 critical)

Ignition
- Cause: Dry thunderstorm Lightning strike

Map
- Location in Portugal

A series of four initial deadly wildfires erupted across central Portugal in the afternoon of 17 June 2017 within minutes of each other, resulting in at least 66 deaths and 204 injured people.

The majority of deaths took place in the Pedrógão Grande municipality, when a fire swept across a road filled with evacuees escaping in their cars. Portuguese officials dispatched more than 1,700 firefighters nationwide to combat the blazes and Prime Minister António Costa declared three days of national mourning. Spain, France, Morocco and Italy deployed firefighters and water bombers to help extinguish the fires. Although most early official reports pointed to a dry thunderstorm as the cause of the tragedy, the President of the Portuguese Firefighters League expressed his conviction the fire was sparked by arsonists.

Four months later, the October 2017 Iberian wildfires would cause 45 deaths in Portugal and four in Spain, for a total of 115 deaths (111 in Portugal, 4 in Spain) between the two incidents.

== Background ==
An intense heat wave preceded the fires, with many areas of Portugal seeing temperatures in excess of 40 °C (104 °F). During the afternoon of 17 June, a total of 156 fires erupted across the country, particularly in mountainous areas 200 km (120 mi) north-northeast of Lisbon. The fires began in the Pedrógão Grande municipality before spreading dramatically causing a firestorm.

Dry thunderstorms preceded the event and may have ignited some fires although arson has not been eliminated as a cause: the National Director of the Judiciary Police, Almeida Rodrigues, has stated that the police, along with the National Republican Guard, have allegedly since found the tree that started the fire when it was struck by lightning. It is not known how this tree was identified out of the many thousands of other burnt trees. The forests of Pinhal Interior Norte, where Pedrógão Grande is located, are predominately composed of farmed Eucalyptus and pine trees, the Eucalyptus having surpassed pine as the dominant tree in the country in the last ten years.

== Events ==
At least 66 people died nationwide in the fires—the largest loss of life due to wildfires in Portugal's history. At least 204 people were injured, including 13 firefighters; five people—four firefighters and one child—were in critical condition. Two firefighters were also reported missing. A total of 44,969 hectares (111,120 acres) of land was burned by the fires as of 20 June. Of this, 29,693 hectares (73,370 acres) was in the Pedrógão Grande area.

The greatest loss of life took place on a rural road in Pedrógão Grande, where 47 people died in or near their cars when a fire overtook the area; 30 people died while trapped in their vehicles while the other 17 died nearby trying to escape on foot. Another 11 people died in Nodeirinho, near the IC8 road. Twelve people survived near Mó Grande as fire overtook the roads by taking refuge in a large water tank near the motorway. Dozens of small communities were severely affected.

Prime Minister António Costa called the disaster "the greatest tragedy we have seen in recent years in terms of forest fires". Three days of national mourning were declared beginning on 18 June. Arriving at Pedrógão Grande before midnight on 17 June, President Marcelo Rebelo de Sousa was visibly shaken, and gave long hugs to Jorge Gomes, the Secretary of State of Internal Administration (who had been on the scene since the fire broke out), Valdemar Ramos, the Mayor of Pedrógão Grande and, after addressing the journalists, Constança Urbano de Sousa, the Minister of Internal Administration. The President met with survivors who were evacuated to Leiria.

More than 1,700 firefighters were deployed to combat the fires. France and Spain provided a collective five water-bombing planes along with 200 members of the Military Emergencies Unit and the European Union began coordinating international relief efforts on 18 June. Many people were evacuated to neighboring Avelar, where residents provided them with shelter. Low-hanging smoke prevented helicopters from providing support, hampering firefighting efforts. Some survivors criticized inadequate response from the government, claiming no firefighters reached them for hours after the blaze began. They also stated poor forestry planning and "depopulation of remote villages that left many wooded areas untended" were to blame.

In the afternoon of 20 June, according to reports, one of the foreign aid Canadair water bombers crashed over Pedrógão Grande, though Secretary of State of Internal Administration Jorge Gomes could not confirm the reports. Later, the National Authority for Civil Defence dismissed all reports of a plane crash, attributing eye-witness reports of the crash to a gas explosion on a camper trailer.

== Reactions ==
In Rome, Pope Francis led thousands of people in silent prayer for the victims. The leaders of China, Greece, Italy, Germany, Canada, India and Brazil also sent condolences. The Spanish prime minister, Mariano Rajoy, tweeted that he was "stunned by the tragedy in Pedrógão Grande", and offered to provide any assistance necessary. Christos Stylianides of the European Commission expressed "condolences to those that have lost loved ones", adding that "the EU is fully ready to help. All will be done to assist the authorities and people of Portugal at this time of need." French president Emmanuel Macron tweeted: "Solidarity with Portugal, hit by terrible fires. Our thoughts are with victims. France makes its aid available to Portugal."

== Other information ==
On the afternoon of 18 June, the Portugal national team, playing against Mexico for the FIFA Confederations Cup in Russia, donned black armbands in remembrance of the victims, and a minute of silence was observed prior to kickoff.

António Guterres, Secretary-General of the United Nations, himself Portuguese, said he was shocked by the tragedy and pledged to offer all needed assistance.

The Portuguese winner of the Eurovision Song Contest 2017, Salvador Sobral, announced on 19 June 2017 that he would donate all the profits from the sales of his CDs sold during a concert in Ourém to the people of Pedrógão Grande and the relief efforts in the town.
