= Hernâni Dias =

Portuguese politician (born 1967)

Secretary of State for Local Administration and Spatial Planning
- In office 5 April 2024 – 28 January 2025
- Minister: Manuel Castro Almeida
- Preceded by: Carlos Miguel
- Succeeded by: Silvério Regalado

Member of the Assembly of the Republic
- Incumbent
- Assumed office 26 March 2024
- Constituency: Bragança

Mayor of Bragança
- In office 29 September 2013 – 25 March 2024
- Preceded by: António Nunes
- Succeeded by: Paulo Xavier

Member of the Bragança City Council
- In office 11 October 2009 – 25 March 2024

President of the Sendas Parish
- In office 16 December 2001 – 11 October 2009

Personal details
- Born: Hernâni Dinis Venâncio Dias; 29 August 1967 (age 58) Sendas, Bragança, Portugal
- Party: Social Democratic Party
- Occupation: Teacher • Politician

Hernâni Dinis Venâncio Dias (born 29 August 1967) is a Portuguese politician serving as a member of the Assembly of the Republic since 2025. From 2013 to 2024, he served as mayor of Bragança. From 2024 to 2025, he served as secretary of state for local administration.
