= Bouçã Dam =

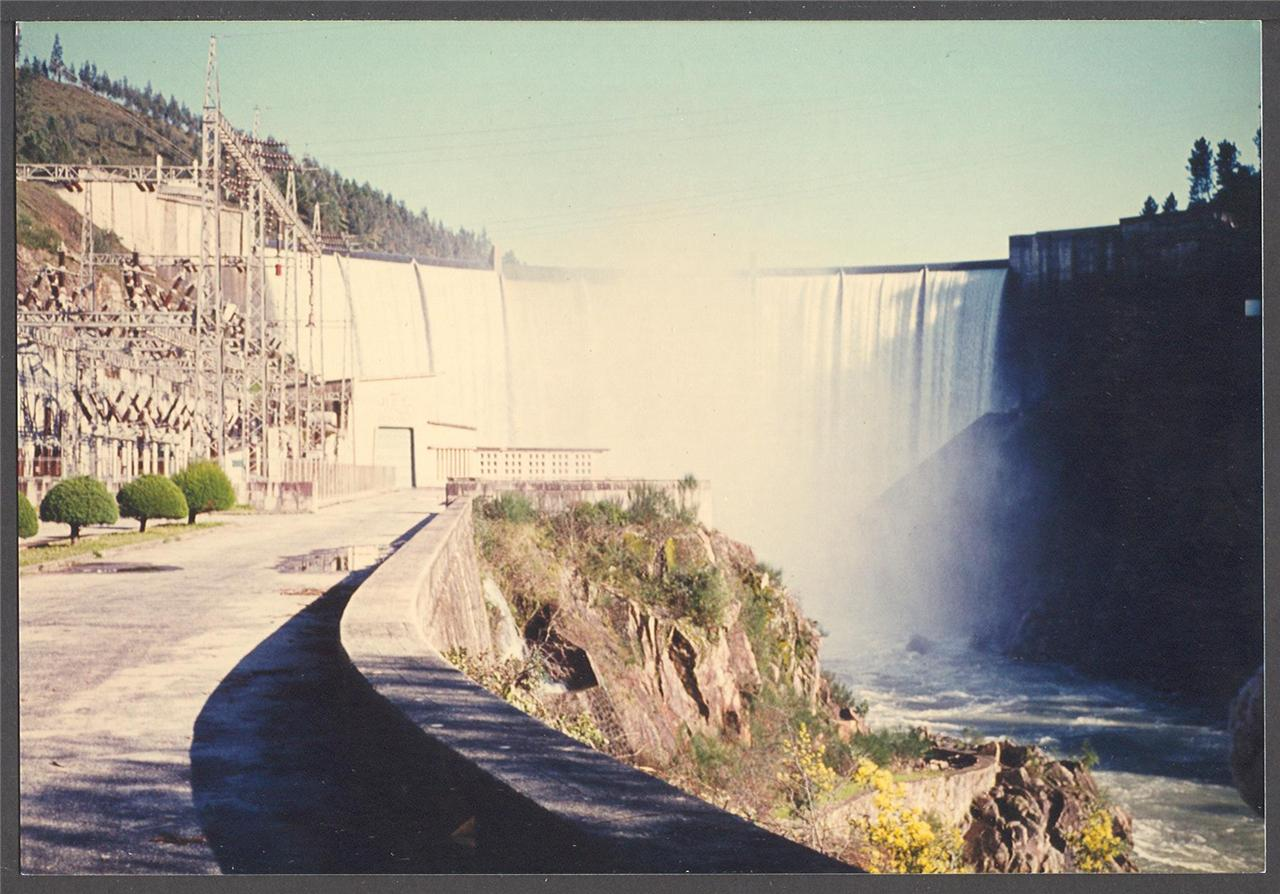

- Location within Portugal
- Official name: Barragem da Bouçã
- Location: municipality Pedrógão Grande, Leiria District, Portugal
- Coordinates: 39°51′12.6″N 8°13′8.2″W
- Purpose: Power
- Status: Operational
- Opening date: 1955
- Owner: Companhia Portuguesa de Produção de Electricidade

Dam and spillways
- Type of dam: Concrete double curvature arch dam
- Impounds: Zêzere River
- Height (foundation): 63 m (207 ft)
- Length: 175 m (574 ft)
- Elevation at crest: 181 m (594 ft)
- Dam volume: 70,000 m^{3} (2,500,000 cu ft)
- Spillway type: Over the dam
- Spillway capacity: 2,200 m³

Reservoir
- Total capacity: 48,400,000 m^{3} (39,200 acre⋅ft)
- Active capacity: 15,220,000 m^{3} (12,340 acre⋅ft)
- Surface area: 5 km^{2} (1.9 mi^{2})
- Normal elevation: 175 m (574 ft)

Power Station
- Operator: Energias de Portugal
- Commission date: 1955
- Hydraulic head: 56.5 m (185 ft) (max)
- Turbines: 2 x 25 MW Francis-type
- Installed capacity: 44 MW
- Annual generation: 153.2 GWh

Bouçã Dam (Portuguese: Barragem da Bouçã) is a concrete double curvature arch dam on the Zêzere River, where the river forms the border line between the districts of Castelo Branco and Leiria. It is located in the municipality Pedrógão Grande, in Leiria District, Portugal.

The dam was completed in 1955. It is owned by Companhia Portuguesa de Produção de Electricidade (CPPE).

== Dam ==
Bouçã Dam is a 63 m tall (height above foundation) and 175 m long double curvature arch dam with a crest altitude of 181 m. The volume of the dam is 70,000 m³. The dam features an uncontrolled spillway over the dam (maximum discharge 2,200 m³/s) and one bottom outlet (maximum discharge 200 m³/s).

== Reservoir ==
At full reservoir level of 175 m the reservoir of the dam has a surface area of 5 km² and a total capacity of 48.4 mio. m³; its active capacity is 15.22 (7.9) mio. m³.

== Power plant ==
The hydroelectric power plant began operations in 1955. It is operated by EDP. The plant has a nameplate capacity of 44 (50) MW. Its average annual generation is 153.2 (140, 157,2 or 162) GWh.

The power station contains 2 Francis turbine-generators with 25 MW (28 MVA) each in a surface powerhouse at the right side of the dam. The turbine rotation is 214.3 rpm. The minimum hydraulic head is 52.5 m, the maximum 56.5 m. Maximum flow per turbine is 50 m³/s.

== See also ==
- List of power stations in Portugal
- List of dams and reservoirs in Portugal
