= Dom Pedro =

Dom Pedro (Lord Peter) is the traditional Portuguese appellation of several kings of Portugal:

- Pedro I of Portugal
- Pedro II of Portugal
- Pedro III of Portugal
- Pedro IV of Portugal
- Pedro V of Portugal

and of the two 19th-century Emperors of Brazil:

- Pedro I of Brazil
- Pedro II of Brazil

== Others ==
- Dom Pedro, a Haitian Vodou houngan deified as Dan Petro
- Dom Pedro (card game), American card game of the All Fours family
- Dom Pedro V Theatre
- D. Pedro V High School
- The Dom Pedro aquamarine
- Steamship Wyreema renamed to Dom Pedro I
