= Zêzere River =

River in northern Portugal

Zêzere
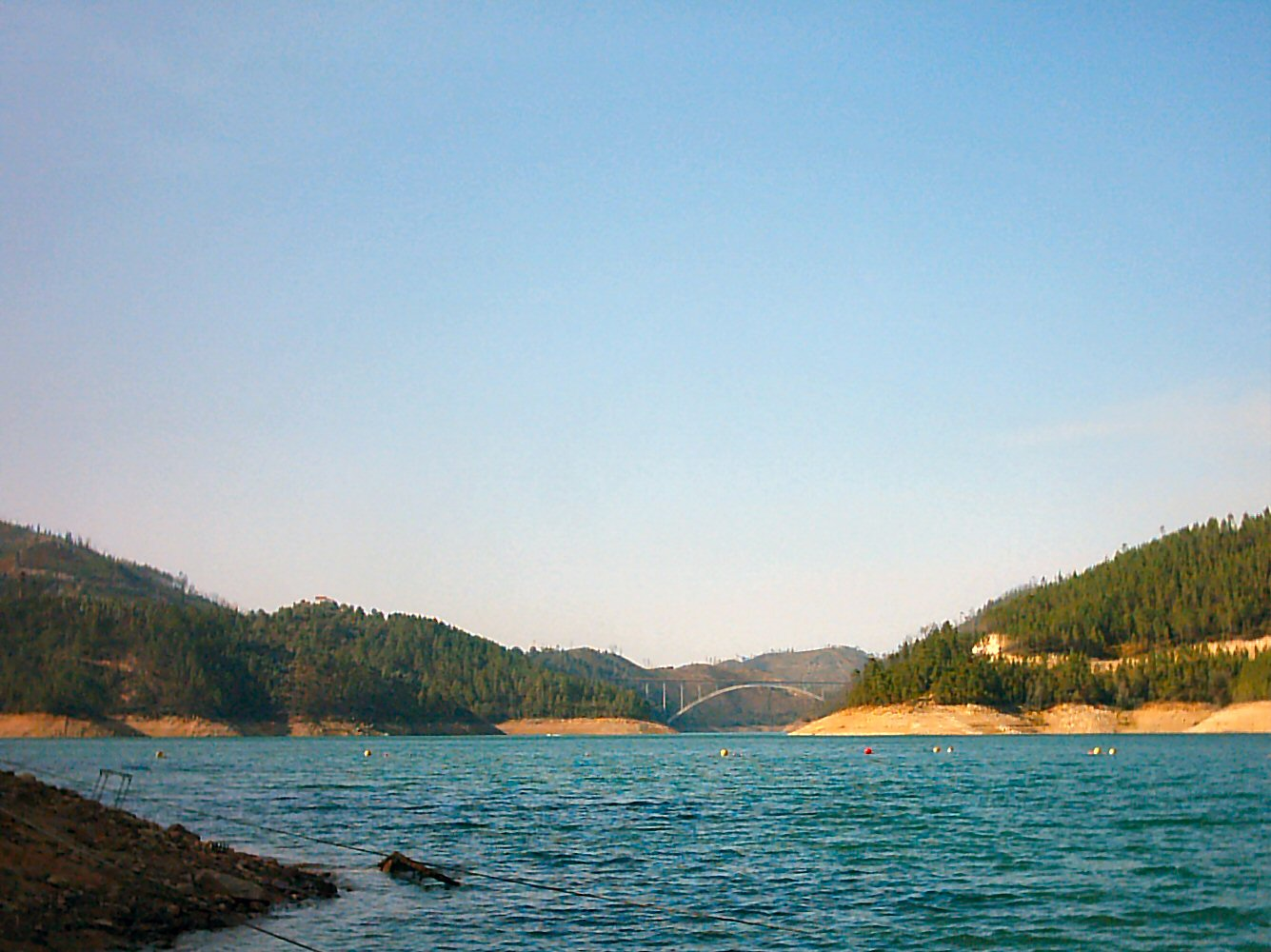
- Lago Azul on the Zêzere River, with the bridge between Vila de Rei and Ferreira do Zêzere in the background

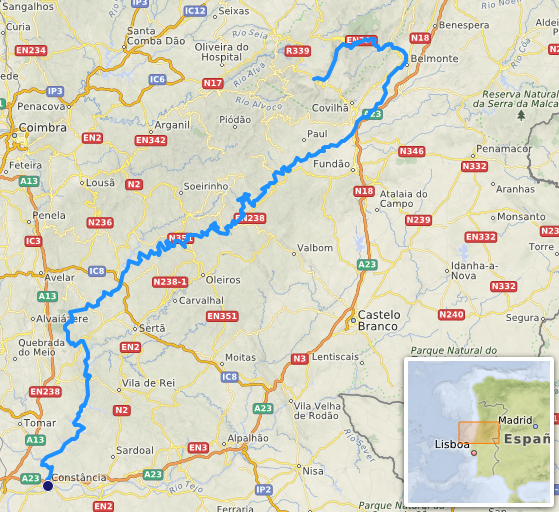

Location
- Country: Portugal
- NUTS II: Centro Region, Portugal
- Towns: Manteigas, Belmonte, Constância

Physical characteristics
- Source: near Cântaro Magro
  - location: Serra da Estrela
  - coordinates: 40°19′50″N 7°35′49″W
  - elevation: 1,900 m (6,200 ft)
- Mouth: Tagus River
  - location: Constância
  - coordinates: 39°28′24″N 8°20′21″W
  - elevation: 20 m (66 ft)
- Length: 214 km (133 mi)
- Basin size: 5,043 km^{2} (1,947 sq mi)

Basin features
- Progression: Tagus→ Atlantic Ocean
- Tributaries
  - right: Nabão

The Zêzere (Portuguese pronunciation: [ˈzezɨɾɨ]) is a river in Portugal, tributary to the Tagus. It rises in the Serra da Estrela, near the Torre, the highest point of continental Portugal. The Zêzere runs through the town Manteigas, runs through Belmonte, passes south of the city of Covilhã and east of the town of Pedrogão Grande. It flows into the Tagus in Constância. It is the second longest river entirely within Portuguese territory (the Mondego being the longest). Its slope allows for the hydroelectric powerplants of Cabril, Bouçã and Castelo de Bode.

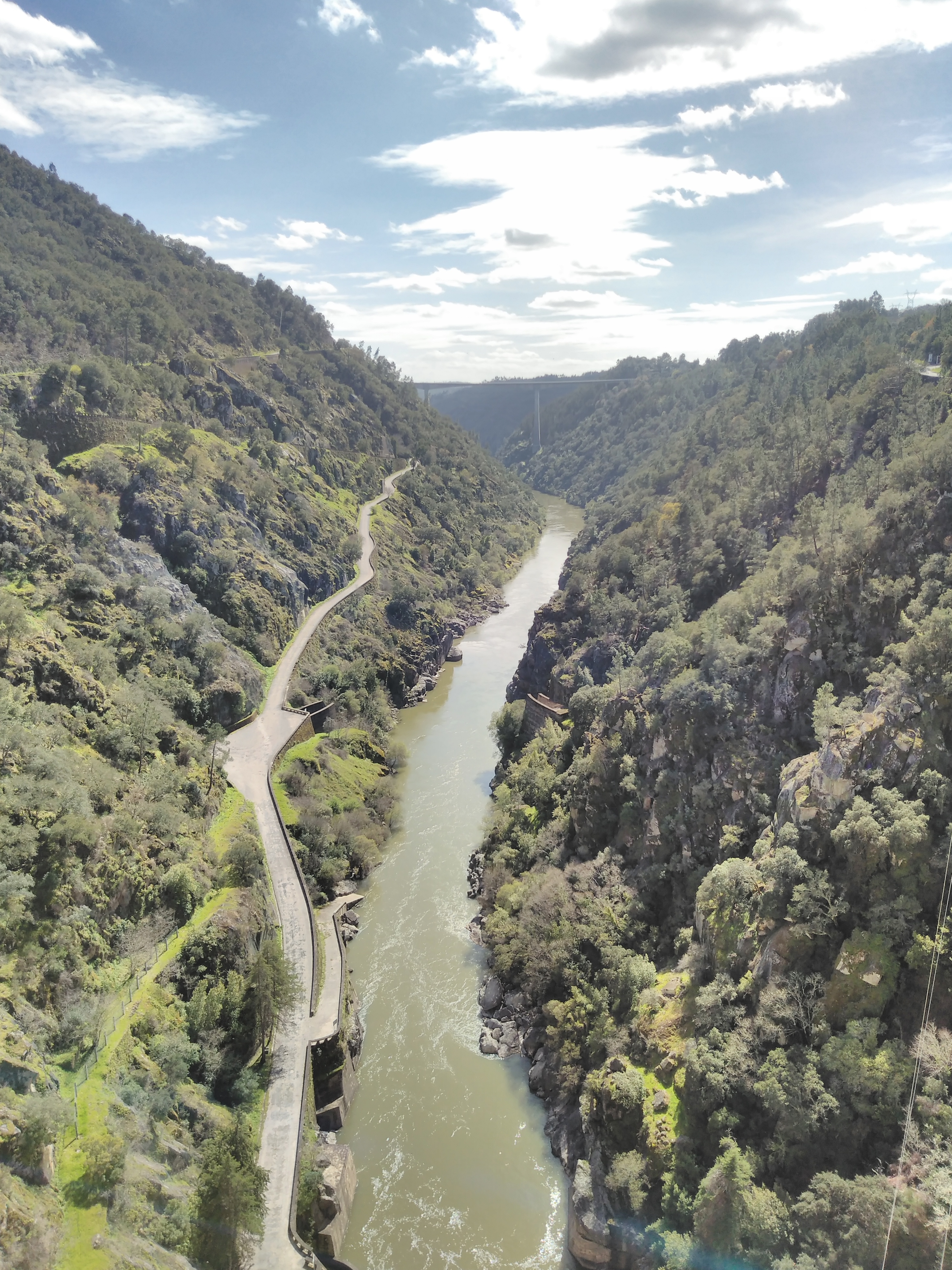
Zêzere seen from the Cabril Dam

== Dams and Reservoirs ==
Beginning at the headwaters, there are 3 dams on the Zêzere:

| Dam | Nameplate capacity (MW) | Reservoir | Surface area | | Total capacity | |
| Dam | Nameplate capacity (MW) | Reservoir | km^{2} | sq mi | million m^{3} | million cu ft |
|---|---|---|---|---|---|---|
| Cabril | 97 | Cabril | 20.23 | 7.81 | 720 | 25,000 |
| Bouçã | 50 | Bouçã | 5 | 1.9 | 48.4 | 1,710 |
| Castelo de Bode | 159 | Castelo de Bode | 32.91 | 12.71 | 1,095 | 38,700 |

Designations

Ramsar Wetland
- Official name: Estrela Mountain upper Plateau and upper Zêzere River
- Designated: 2 December 2005
- Reference no.: 1614
