= Júlia Rodrigues =

Portuguese politician (born 1971)

Member of the Assembly of the Republic
- Incumbent
- Assumed office 3 June 2025
- Constituency: Bragança
- In office 27 November 2015 – 21 October 2017
- Constituency: Bragança

Mayor of Mirandela
- In office 1 October 2017 – 3 April 2025
- Preceded by: António Branco
- Succeeded by: Vítor Correia

Personal details
- Born: 23 November 1971 (age 54)
- Party: Socialist Party

Júlia Maria de Almeida Lima e Sequeira Rodrigues (born 23 November 1971) is a Portuguese politician. She was elected member of the Assembly of the Republic in 2025, having previously served from 2015 to 2017. From 2017 to 2025, she served as mayor of Mirandela.
