= Eremitério Os Santos =

16th-century hermitage in Portugal

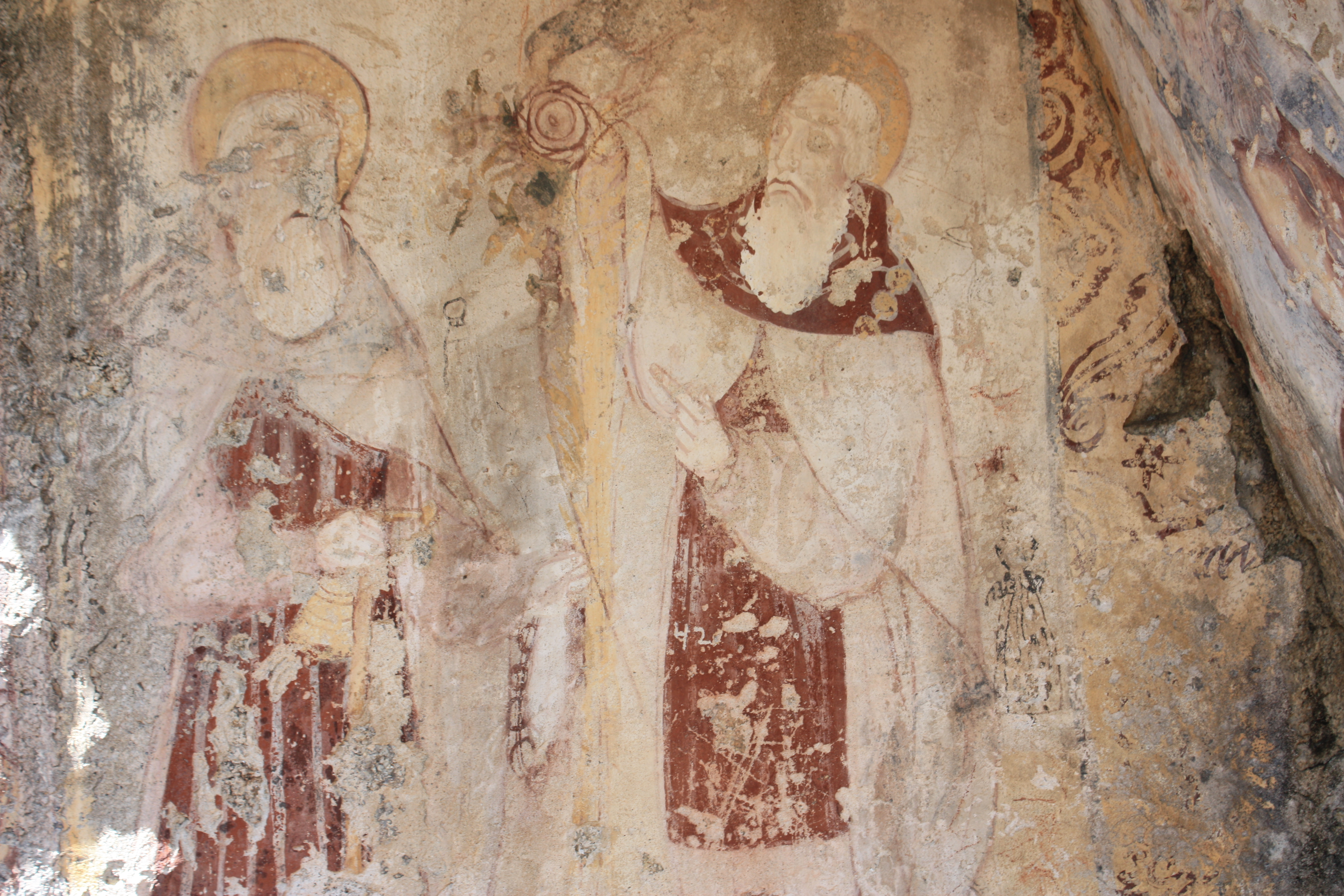
- One of the frescos painted on the wall
- Interactive map of Eremitério Os Santos
- Location: Picote, Miranda do Douro, Portugal
- Coordinates: 41°23′19″N 6°23′42.9″W
- Type: hermitage
- Completion date: 16th century

Eremitério Os Santos (Mirandese: Armitério/Eirmitério Ls Santos is a 16th century hermitage located near the towns of Picote and Sendim e Atenor on the Douro International Natural Park in Northern Portugal.

The Hermitage consists of a chapel in ruins and a shelter with hagiographic frescoes executed in the 16th century in the place known by São Paulo, in the vicinity the chapel of the same name, located about 700 m and closest to the river. The hermitage bears the date of 1553 and the chapel has the date of 1596 inscribed on it. Sculptures and rock graves were identified, a sign of the sacred character of the area and the continuity of rituals and cults that took place there.

The construction of these small chapels was associated with the practice of hermitic life, but also with the itineraries of devotion.

== Fresco ==
The fresco despite having its central theme on the coronation of Mary, also indicates the hermitic motivation of the shelter with regard to the choice of the Conversion of the two hermits, Paul of Thebes and Anthony the Great, one of the scenes of the encounter between the two Saints.

The glorious theme of the Coronation of Our Lady is a variant of the Assumption of Mary and is accompanied by a caption, also painted, in characters that refer to the 16th century, although they may correspond to the slightly earlier period.

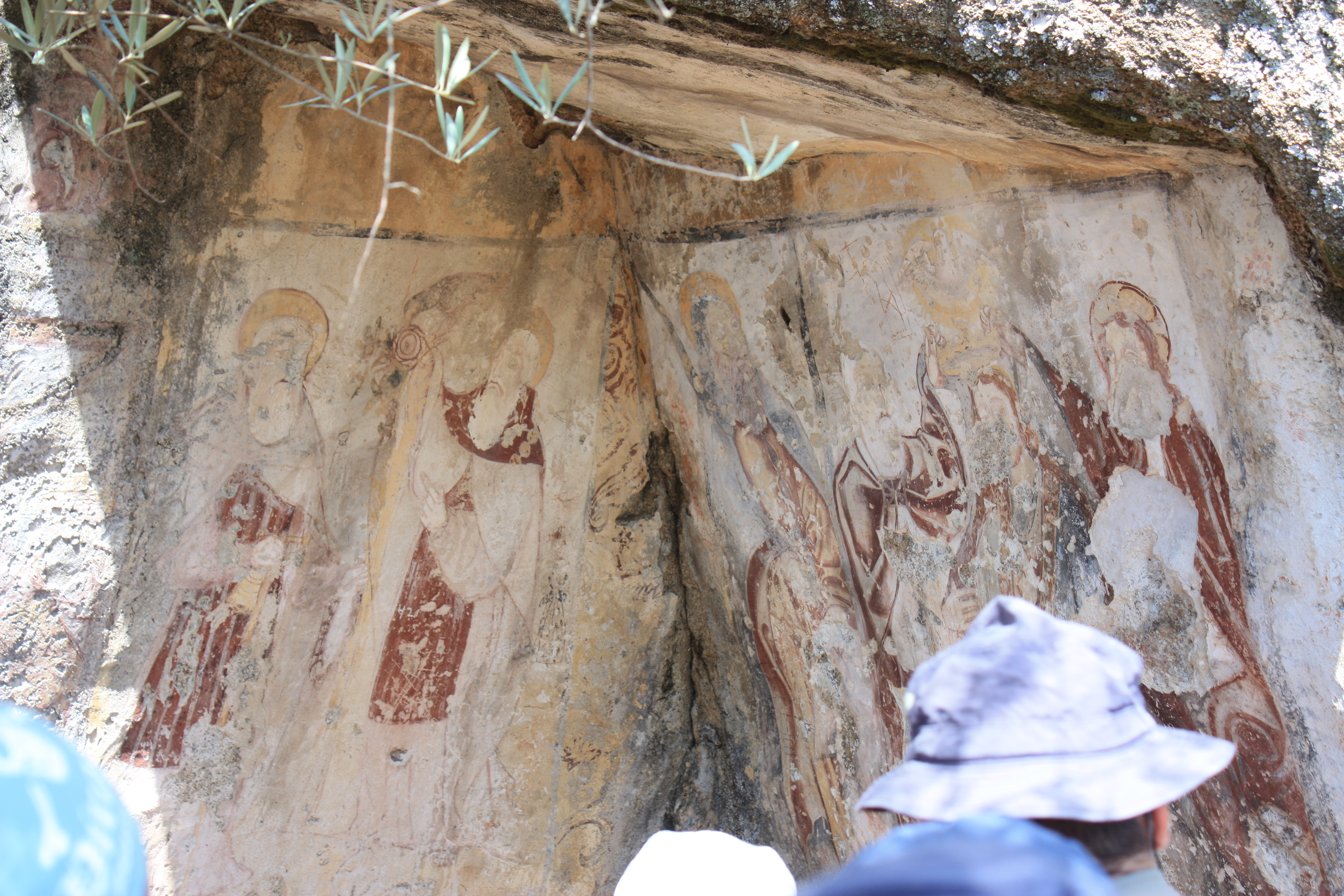

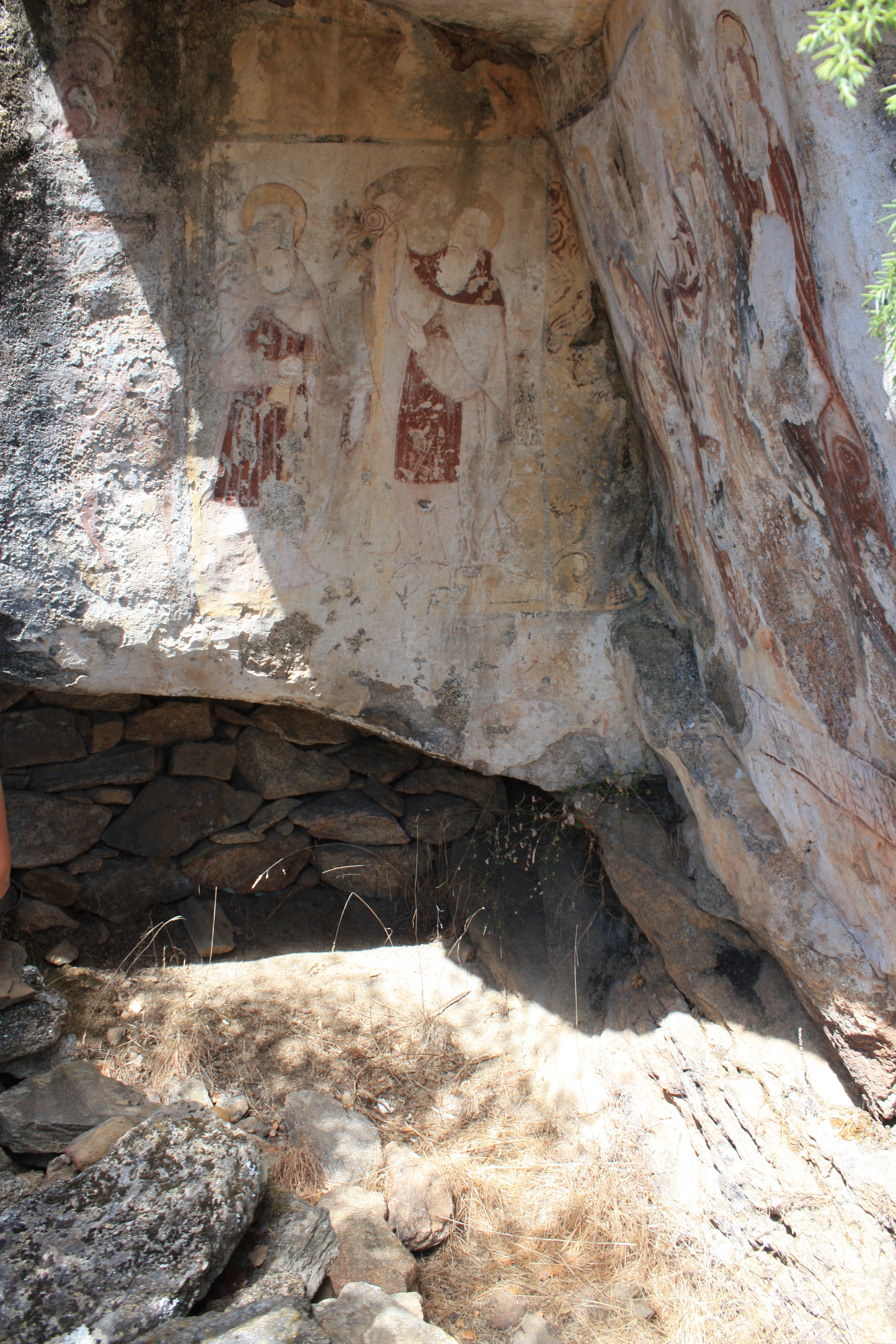

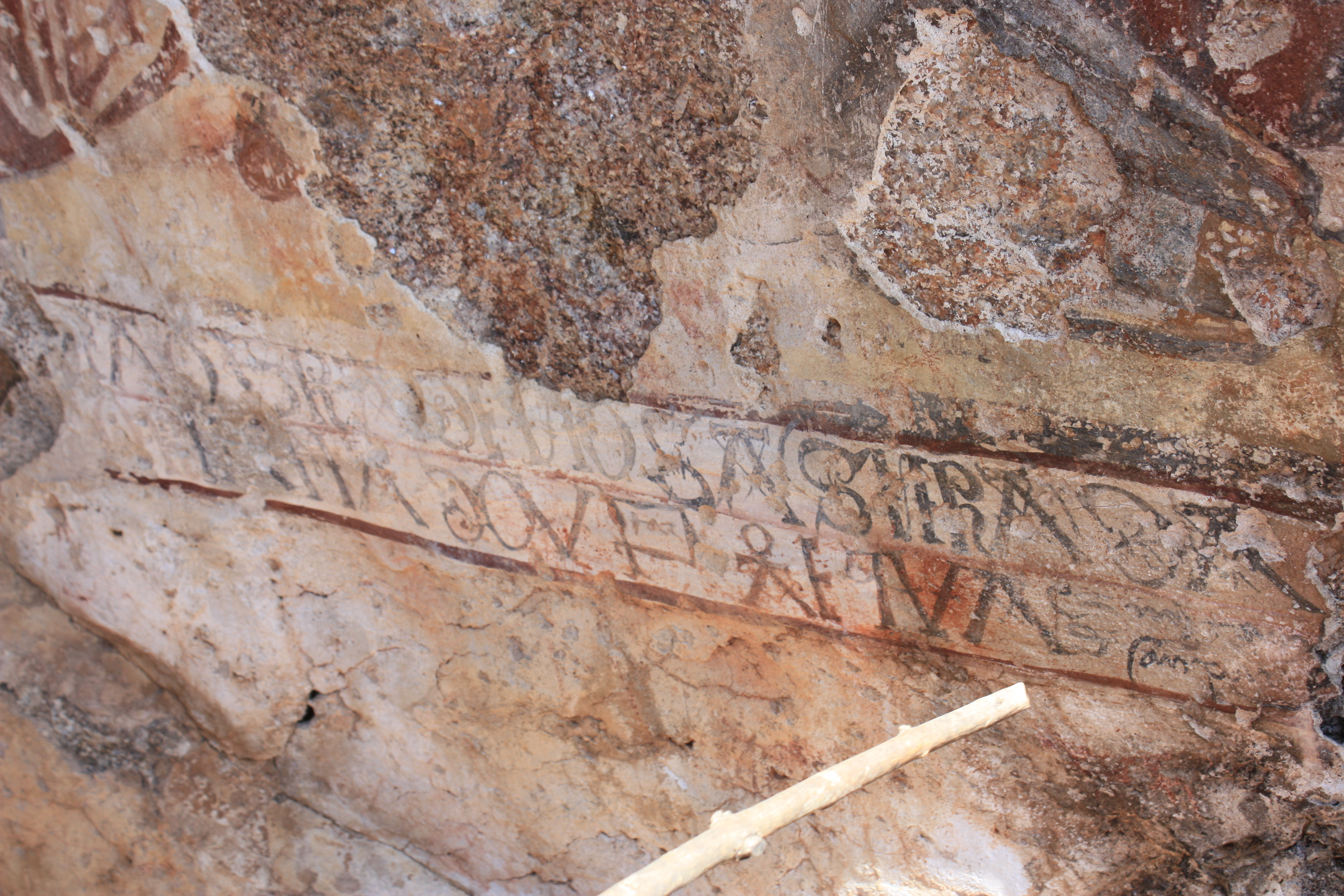

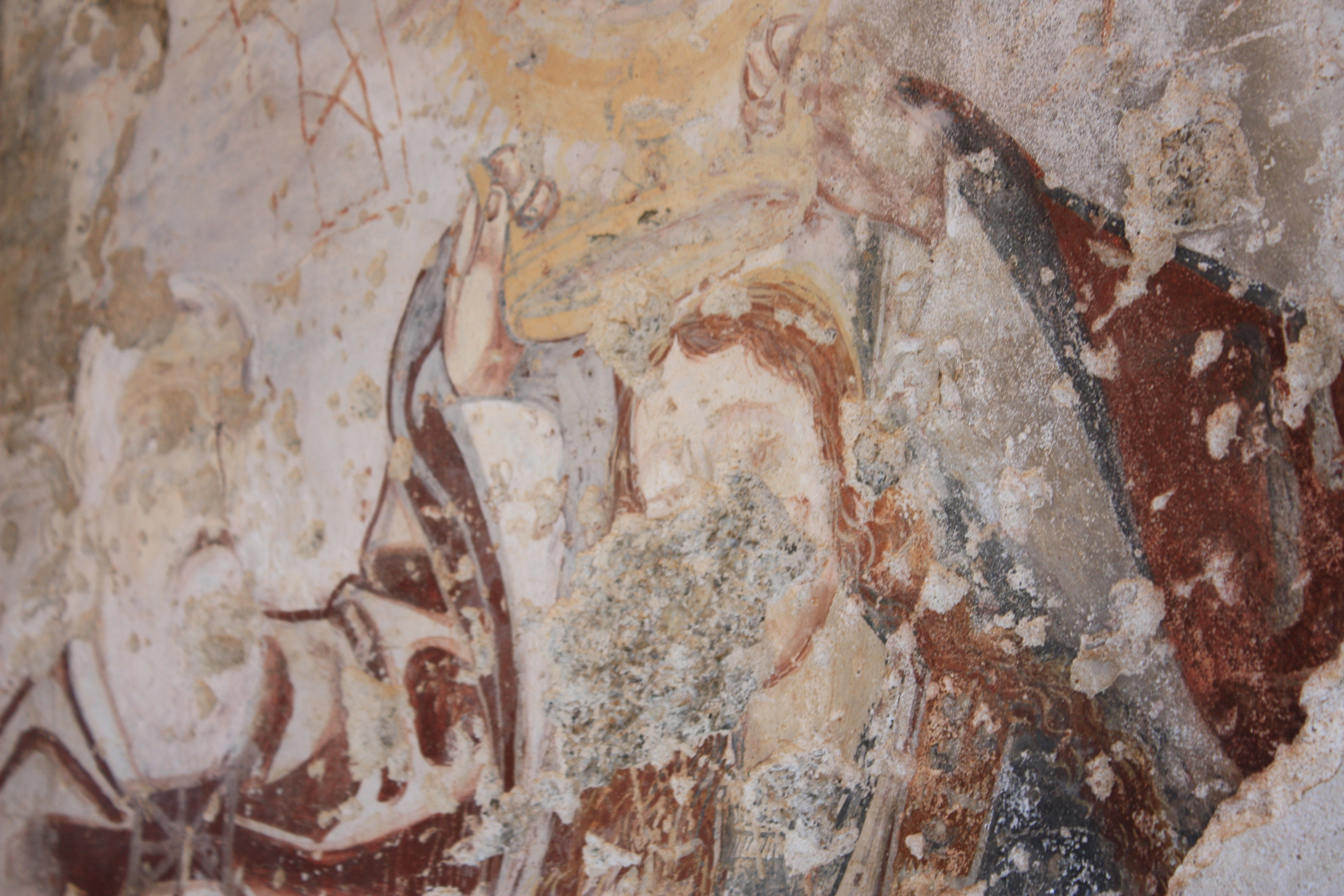
