= Picote (Miranda do Douro) =

Coordinates: 41°24′05″N 6°22′06″W

- Civil parish
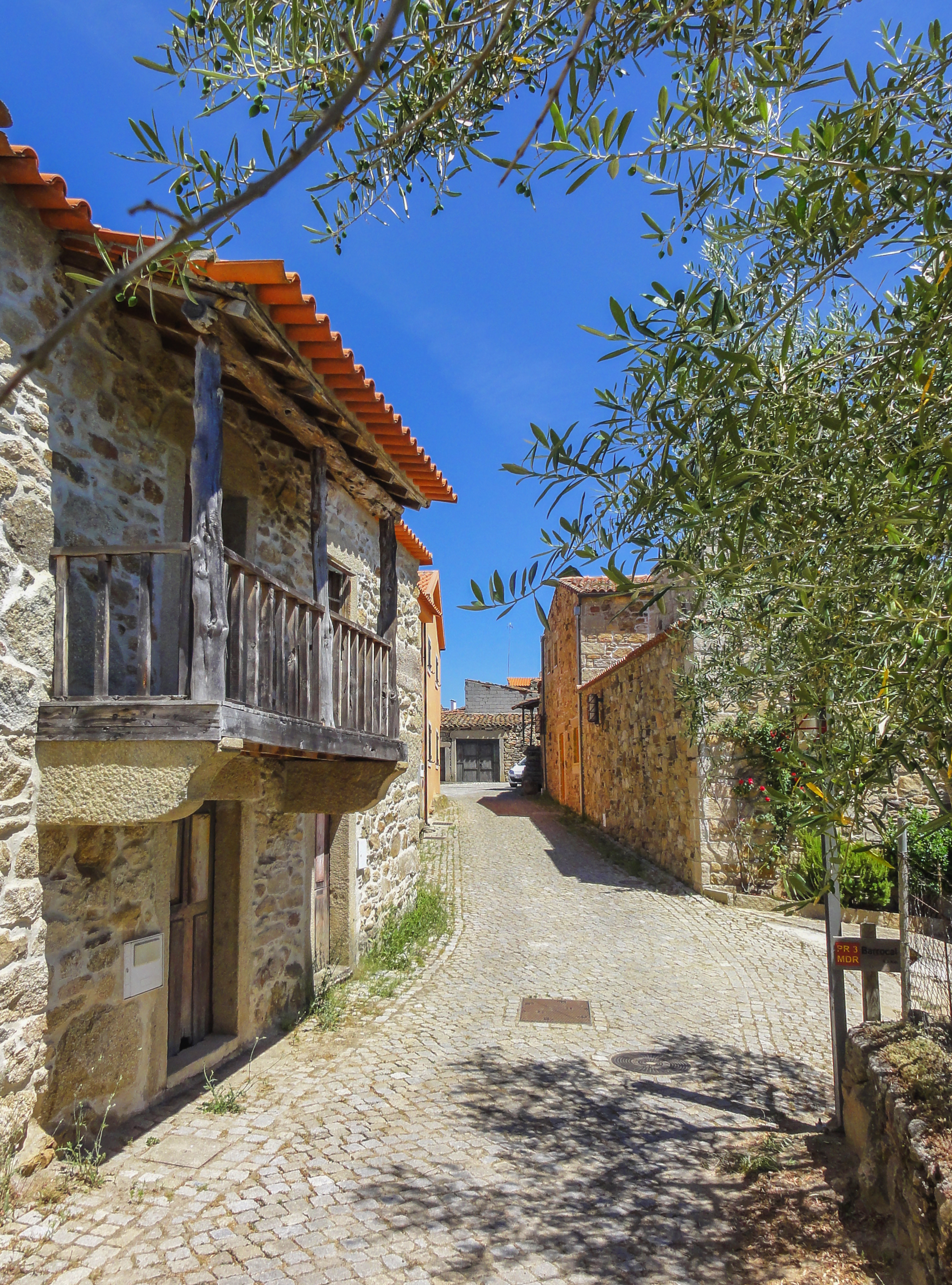

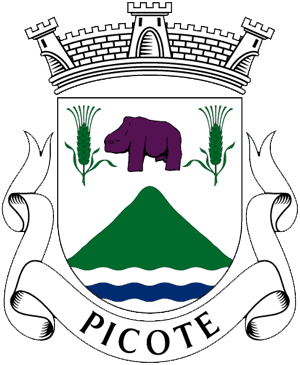
- Coat of arms
- Interactive map of Picote
- Country: Portugal
- Region: Norte
- Intermunic. comm.: Terras de Trás-os-Montes
- District: Bragança
- Municipality: Miranda do Douro

Area
  - Total: 19.95 km^{2} (7.70 sq mi)

Population (2011)
  - Total: 301
  - Density: 15.1/km^{2} (39.1/sq mi)
- Time zone: UTC+00:00 (WET)
  - Summer (DST): UTC+01:00 (WEST)

Picote (Portuguese pronunciation: [piˈkɔ.tɨ]) (Mirandese: Picuote, Mirandese pronunciation: [piˈkwo.tə]) is a civil parish in the municipality of Miranda do Douro, Portugal.

The population in 2011 was 301, in an area of 19.95 km².

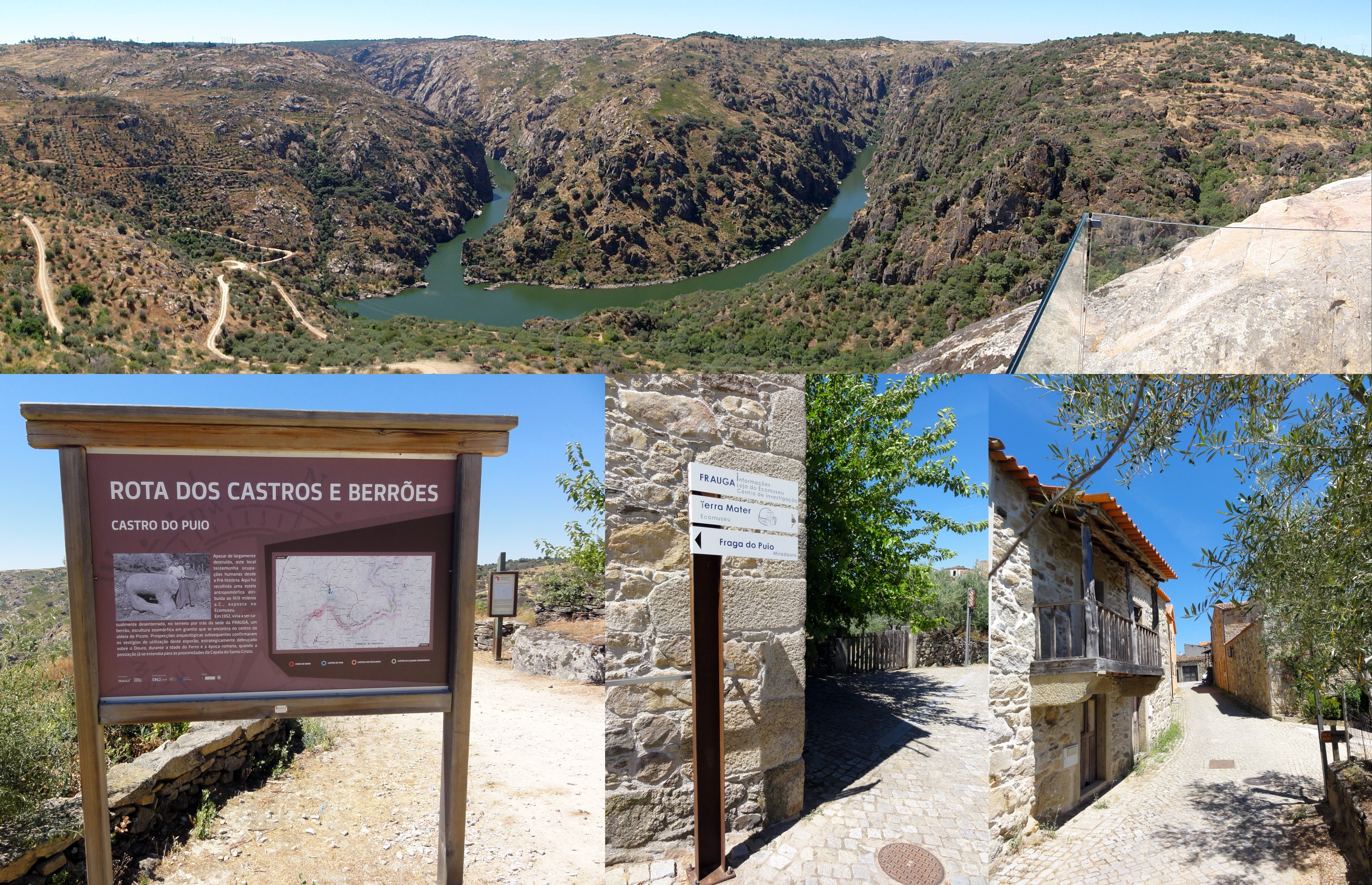
Douro river canyon, Fraga do Puio view from Picote

== Population ==
Population of the freguesia of Picote

Year	Pop.	±%
1864	406	—
1878	458	+12.8%
1890	547	+19.4%
1900	569	+4.0%
1911	578	+1.6%

Year	Pop.	±%
1920	529	−8.5%
1930	549	+3.8%
1940	617	+12.4%
1950	523	−15.2%
1960	1,875	+258.5%

Year	Pop.	±%
1970	812	−56.7%
1981	692	−14.8%
1991	484	−30.1%
2001	368	−24.0%
2011	301	−18.2%

== See also ==
- Eremitério Os Santos
