= João Lopes Marques =

Portuguese writer living in Tallinn

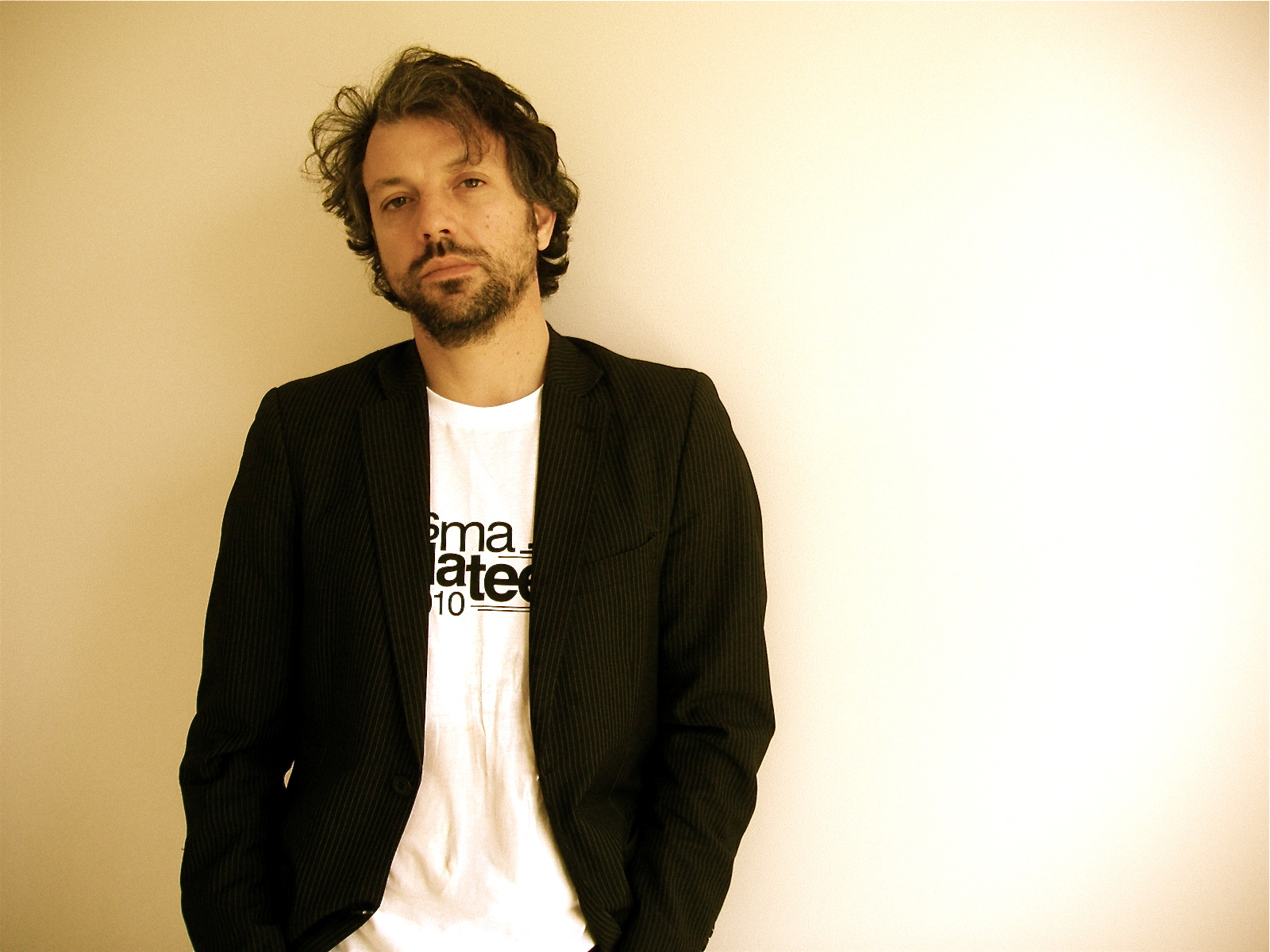
João Lopes Marques

João Lopes Marques (born 29 August 1971 in Lisbon) is a Tallinn-based writer, journalist and blogger.

== Work ==
In his fiction and non-fiction writings João Lopes Marques sheds light on the topics of identities and alternative History. Irony, ethno-futurism and social caricature are usually present in his writings. He made his debut with "O Homem que queria ser Lindbergh" (2007), the caricature of a young Portuguese man searching for more Eastern longitudes. It was followed by "Terra Java" (2008), on the secret discovery of Australia by the Portuguese, and "Iberiana" (2011), a novel-essay about the mysterious Iberia once thrived in present-day Georgia.

In his self-inflicted exile in Tallinn the author has been depicting Estonians weekly in the national media, first with a column in Eesti Ekspress and currently in the main Estonian daily newspaper Postimees. He has also published three chronicle and essay books about Estonia and Estonians. His novel "Odessa, Vanessa" (2013) is a harsh yet funny caricature of identity and cultural tensions between native Balts and Russians. In Portugal he is known especially as a travel journalist and has been writing for nearly decade about chronicles on customs of other peoples across the world. "Choque Cultural" (2012) is an anthology of travel chronicles across five continents. In his book-essay "O Plano Merkel" (2013) he critically portrays the German Chancellor Angela Merkel, whose domestic populism is currently cannibalizing Europe according to the author.

Lopes Marques is the Baltic correspondent of Lusa - Portuguese news agency and he´s the screenwriter of "Cuidado com a Língua!" (RTP) a popular weekly program on Portuguese language.

With movie director Filipe Araújo he co-founded Blablabla Media an experimental multimedia platform. Their short-movie Iberiana, a free adaptation from the homonymous novel, has been selected for different international festivals.

In October 2011 he was invited to give a talk at TEDxEdges (Lisbon), where he spoke about the multiplying power of curiosity sharing his Nordic dream in exile.

João Lopes Marques studied in Liceu D. Pedro V, Technical University of Lisbon and has degrees in International Relations and Journalism.

== Bibliography ==
=== Published in Portugal ===
- "O Plano Merkel. Como Angela Merkel decide o nosso destino", Marcador, 2013. ISBN 978-989-75-4004-2
- "Choque Cultural", Marcador, 2012, ISBN 9789898470454
- "Iberiana", Sextante Editora, 2011, ISBN 978-972-0-07132-3
- "Terra Java", Oficina do Livro, 2008. ISBN 989-555-399-4
- "O Homem que Queria Ser Lindbergh", Oficina do Livro, 2007, ISBN 978-989-555-312-9

=== Published in Spain ===
- "Circo Vicioso", translator Rocio Ramos, Blablabla Media, 2010, ISBN 978-989-96584-0-0

=== Published in Estonia ===
- "Odessa, Vanessa", translator Leenu Nigu, Hea Lugu OÜ, 2013, ISBN 9789949489824
- "Estonia: paradise without palmtrees", editor Todd Barth, Hea Lugu OÜ, 2012, ISBN 9789949489206
- "Eesti ilu välimääraja", translator Teve Floren, Hea Lugu OÜ, 2011, ISBN 978-9949-489-06-0
- "Minu väga ilus eksiil Eestis", translator Teve Floren, Eesti Ajalehed AS, 2011, ISBN 978-9949-478-51-4
- "Mees, kes tahtis olla Lindbergh", translators Teve Floren and Maarja Kaplinski, Eesti Ajalehed AS, 2010, ISBN 978-9949-444-71-7
- "Minu ilus eksiil Eestis", translator Teve Floren, Eesti Ajalehed AS, 2010, ISBN 978-9949-444-61-8

== Prizes ==
In 1995 he was granted the Essay Award of Clube Português de Imprensa. A reportage on Tallinn 2011 European Capital of Culture received one of the two prizes of the Travel Writing Awards in Portugal."Tallinn, blonde, educated and daring" was published in March 2011 by the travel magazine "Rotas & Destinos".

== Some Chronicles ==
=== In English ===
- The ultimate Estonian taboo: "Maarja is also leaving Estonia...", The Baltic Times
- "Tobacco?" No, Tobago!", The Baltic Times

=== In French ===
- Ce pays qui aime les jeunes et méprise les femmes, Courrier International

=== In Russian ===
- WikiФеминизм и сексуально чувствительные государства, The Voice of Russia
- Паранормальная Эстония: полдюжины мистерий, The Voice of Russia
- Тихая гражданская война в Эстонии, The Voice of Russia

=== In Estonian ===
- Teen panuse OÜ-le Bolt & Compal
- 13 väikest asja eestlastest ja Eestist, Eesti Ekspressis
- Kuidas Eesti mind ikka ja jälle üllatab, Eesti Ekspressis
- Eestil on aeg kapist välja tulla, Naine24
- Olgem valvel - sirgumas on uus põlvkond segaverelisi eestlasi, Naine 24
