= Cabril Dam =

Dam in Castelo Branco District, Portugal

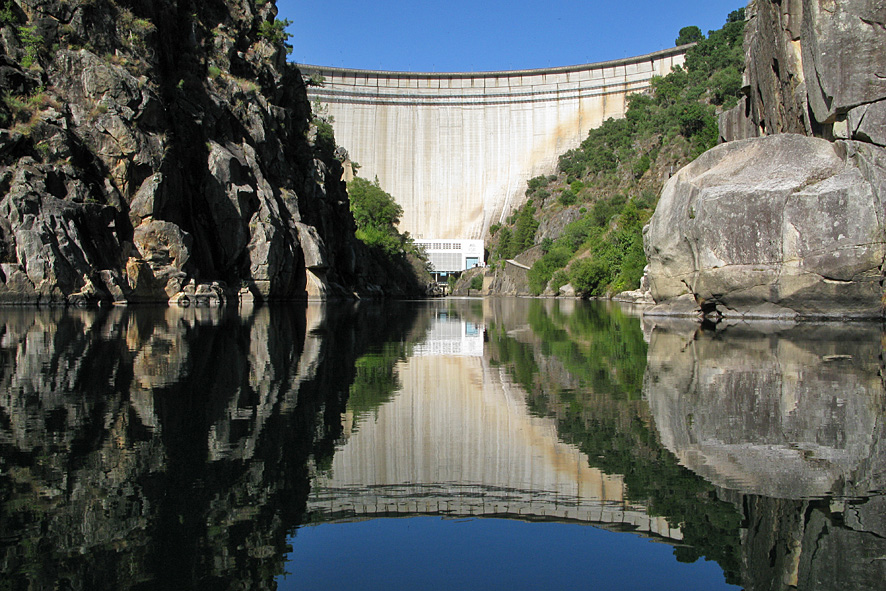

- Location within Portugal
- Official name: Barragem do Cabril
- Country: Portugal
- Location: municipality Sertã, Castelo Branco District
- Coordinates: 39°55′2.2″N 8°7′56.8″W
- Purpose: Power
- Status: Operational
- Construction began: 1950
- Opening date: 1954
- Owner: Companhia Portuguesa de Produção de Electricidade

Dam and spillways
- Type of dam: Concrete double curvature arch dam
- Impounds: Zêzere River
- Height (foundation): 132 m (433 ft)
- Length: 290 m (950 ft)
- Elevation at crest: 297 m (974 ft)
- Dam volume: 360,000 m^{3} (13,000,000 cu ft)
- Spillway type: On both banks shaft spillway
- Spillway capacity: 2,200 m^{3}/s (78,000 cu ft/s)

Reservoir
- Total capacity: 720,000,000 m^{3} (580,000 acre⋅ft)
- Active capacity: 615,000,000 m^{3} (499,000 acre⋅ft)
- Surface area: 20.23 km^{2} (7.81 mi^{2})
- Normal elevation: 294 m (965 ft)

Power Station
- Operator: Energias de Portugal
- Commission date: 1954
- Hydraulic head: 121.5 m (399 ft) (max)
- Turbines: 2 x 47 MW Francis-type
- Installed capacity: 108 MW
- Annual generation: 304.8 GWh

Cabril Dam (Portuguese: Barragem do Cabril) is a concrete double curvature arch dam on the Zêzere River, where the river forms the border line between the districts of Castelo Branco and Leiria. It is located in the municipality Sertã, in Castelo Branco District, Portugal.

Construction of the dam began in 1950. The dam was completed in 1954. It is owned by Companhia Portuguesa de Produção de Electricidade (CPPE).

== Dam ==
Cabril Dam is a 132 m tall (height above foundation) and 290 m long double curvature arch dam with a crest altitude of 297 m. The volume of the dam is 360,000 m³. The dam features on both banks one shaft spillway (combined maximum discharge 2,200 m³/s) and one bottom outlet (maximum discharge 200 m³/s).
The Dam's arch is crossed by Estrada Nacional 2, Portugal's longest road

== Reservoir ==
At full reservoir level of 294 m (maximum flood level of 296.3 m) the reservoir of the dam has a surface area of 20.23 km^{2} and a total capacity of 720 mio. m³ (active capacity 615 mio. m³). Minimum operating level is 240 m. With the 615 mio. m³ water 339.3 GWh can be produced.

== Power plant ==
The hydroelectric power plant went operational in 1954. It is owned by CPPE, but operated by EDP. The plant has a nameplate capacity of 108 (97) MW. Its average annual generation is 304.8 (301 or 312) GWh.

The power station contains 2 Francis turbine-generators with 47 MW (61 MVA) each in a surface powerhouse at the toe of the dam. The turbine rotation is 214.3 rpm. The minimum hydraulic head is 84.6 m, the maximum 121.5 m. Maximum flow per turbine is 54 m³/s.

== See also ==
- List of power stations in Portugal
- List of dams and reservoirs in Portugal
