= Sendas =

- Civil parish
- Location in Portugal
- Coordinates: 41.604°N 6.837°W
- Country: Portugal
- Region: Norte
- Intermunic. comm.: Terras de Trás-os-Montes
- District: Bragança
- Municipality: Bragança

Area
  - Total: 19.17 km^{2} (7.40 sq mi)

Population (2021)
  - Total: 150
  - Density: 7.8/km^{2} (20/sq mi)
- Time zone: UTC+00:00 (WET)
  - Summer (DST): UTC+01:00 (WEST)

Sendas is a civil parish in the municipality of Bragança, Portugal. The population in 2021 was 150, in an area of 19.17 km^{2} (7.40 sq mi).
