= Pedrógão Grande =

- Municipality
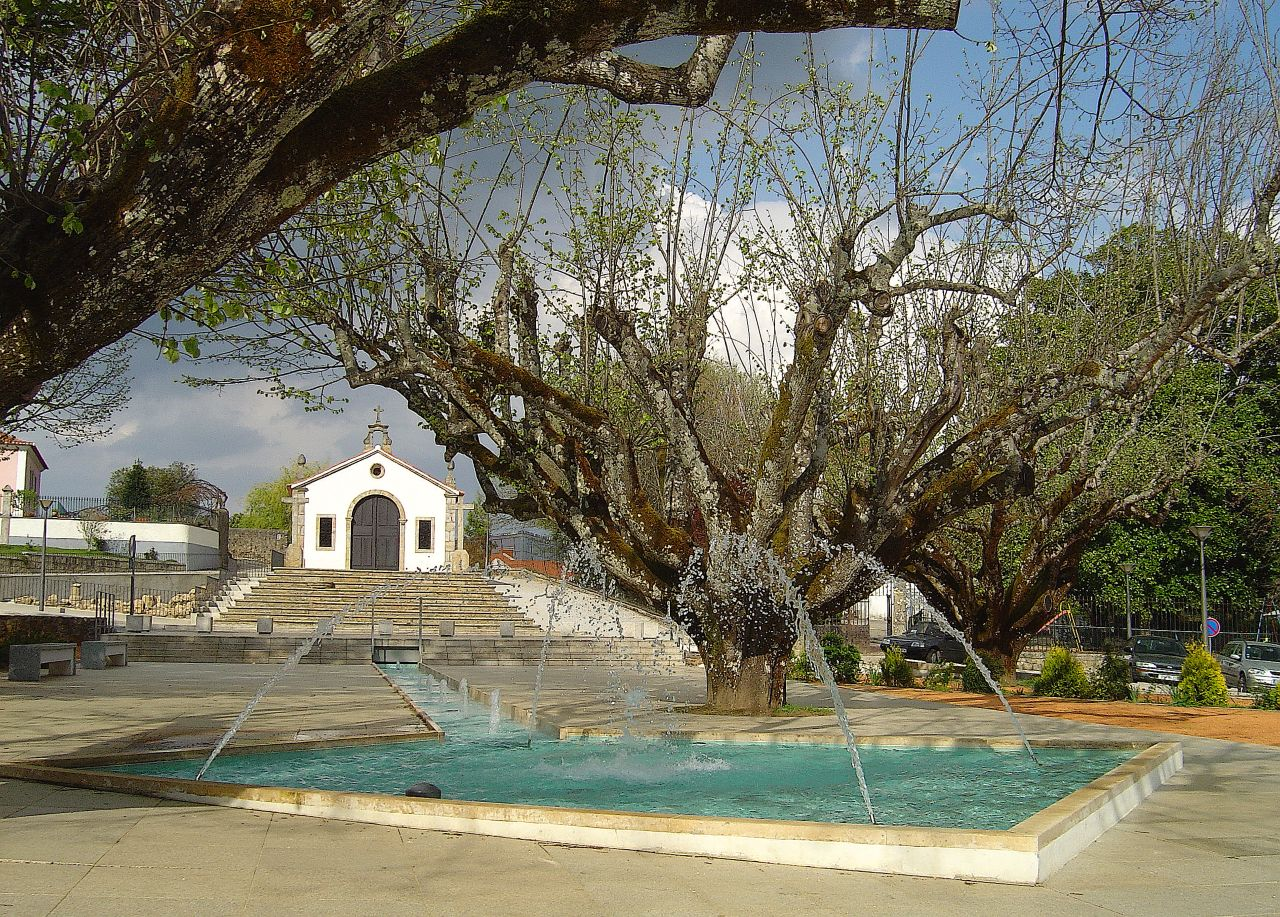

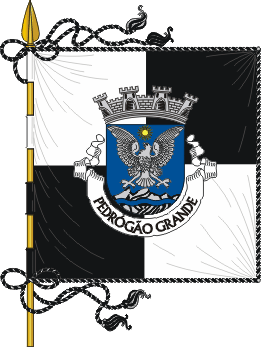
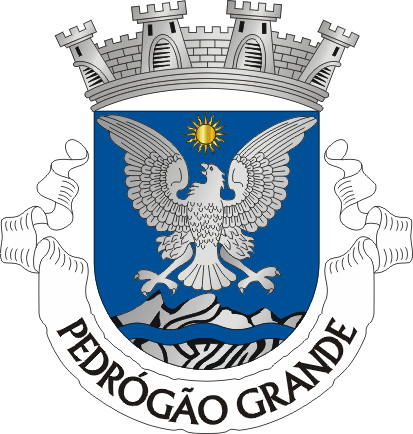
- Flag Coat of arms
- Interactive map of Pedrogão Grande
- Coordinates: 39°55′01″N 8°08′52″W
- Country: Portugal
- Region: Centro
- Intermunic. comm.: Região de Leiria
- District: Leiria
- Parishes: 3

Government
  - President: António Lopes (PSD)

Area
  - Total: 128.75 km^{2} (49.71 sq mi)

Population (2011)
  - Total: 3,915
  - Density: 30.41/km^{2} (78.76/sq mi)
- Time zone: UTC+00:00 (WET)
  - Summer (DST): UTC+01:00 (WEST)
- Local holiday: July 24
- Website: http://www.cm-pedrogaogrande.pt

Pedrógão Grande (Portuguese pronunciation: [pɨˈðɾɔɣɐ̃w ˈɡɾɐ̃dɨ]; Proto-Celtic: *Pendraganum) is a portuguese municipality in the historical Beira Litoral province, in Central Region and district of Leiria. The population in 2011 was 3,915 in an area of 128.75 km^{2} (49.71 sq mi).

The town itself has fewer than 2,000 inhabitants, with the remaining population living in several small villages surrounded by forests. The town center contains historical provincial gentry housing. The earliest town charter dates to 1206, when rights to hold a market were conceded by Afonso Pedro, natural son of Afonso II of Portugal; however, the current municipality was established only in 1898. The present mayor is Valdemar Gomes Fernandes Alves, an independent elected in 2013 by the Social Democratic Party. The municipal holiday is July 24.

The municipality is located in a large region of granite and shale in the basin of the Zêzere and Unhais rivers and the streams of Pêra and Mega, currently enlarged by the reservoirs of two large dams: Cabril and Bouçã. It has a typical Mediterranean climate: winters are cold, the summers dry and torrid. The reservoirs have affected the local climate, making it more gentle. These waters are rich in fisheries including black bass, barbo, and boga.

The municipality and surrounding region has suffered in the 2017 Portugal wildfires, leaving 64 dead, over 250 injured and forty evacuated villages.

Storm Kristin caused a catastrophic impact in the municipality in January 2026.

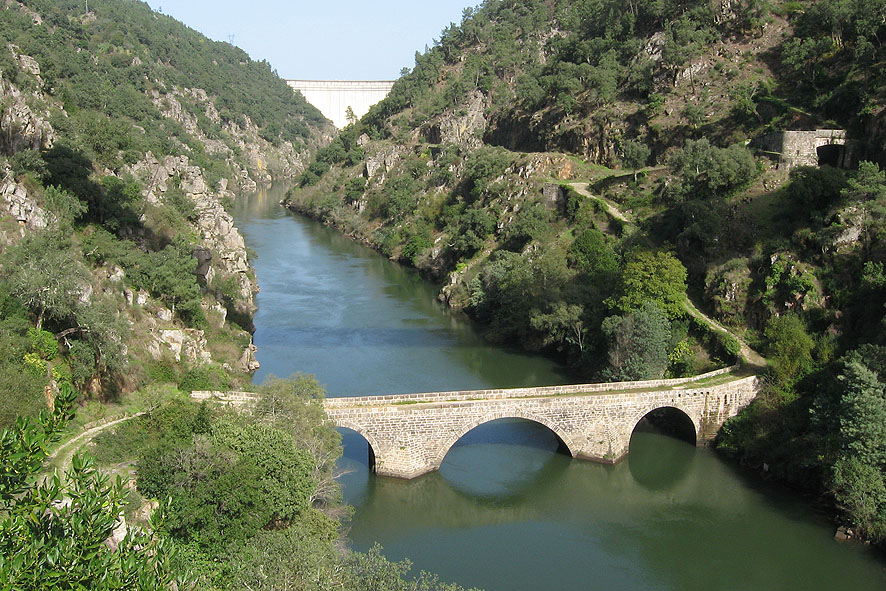
Old bridge (Filipina)

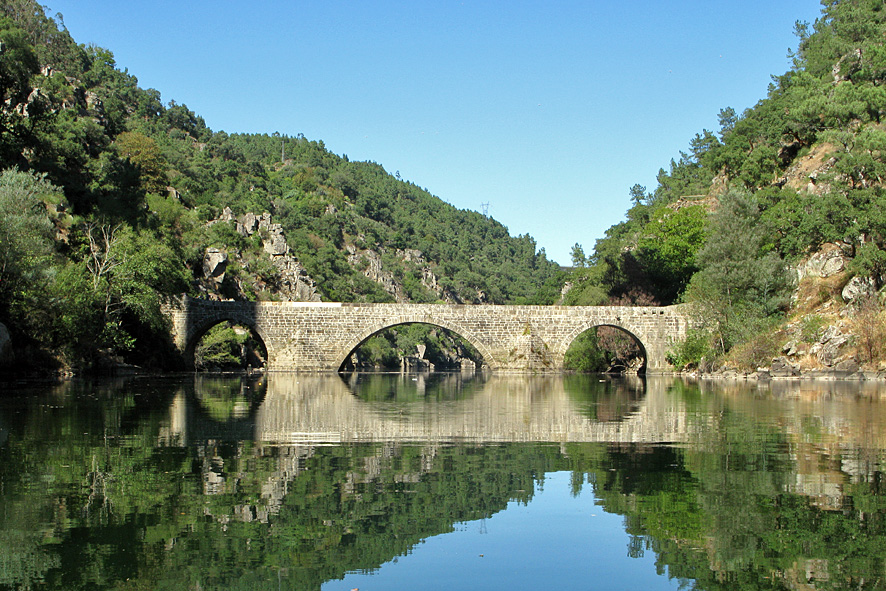
Old bridge (Filipina)

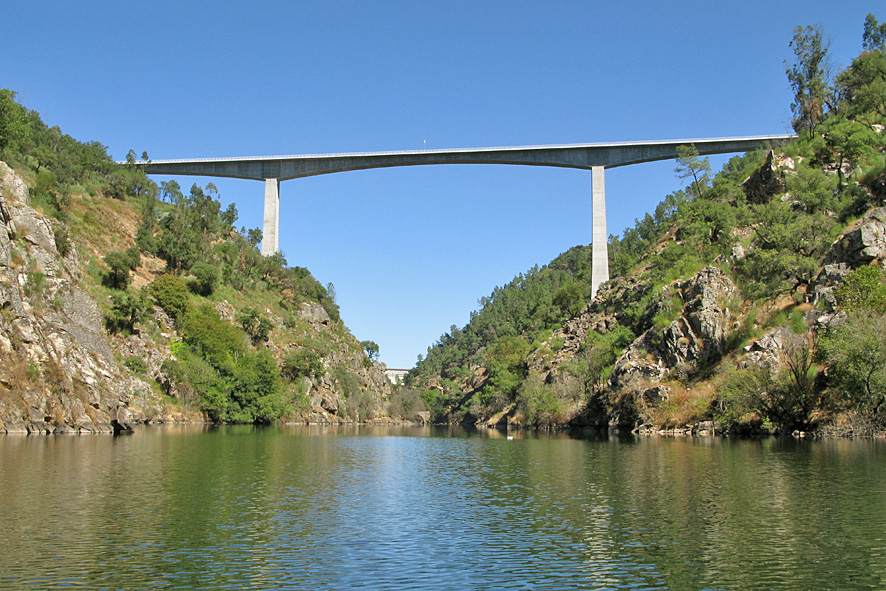
Bridge over Zêzere river (IC8)

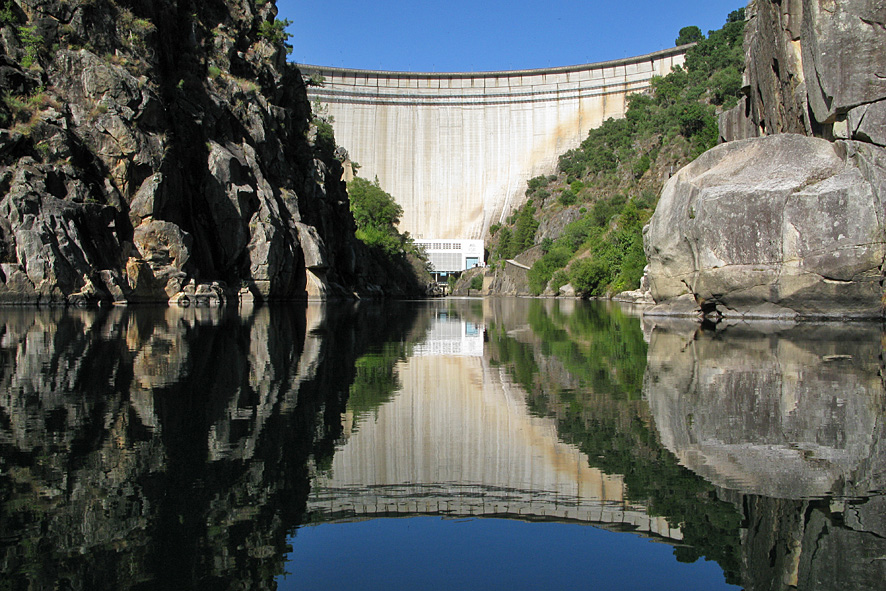
Cabril Dam

== Parishes ==
Administratively, the municipality is divided into three civil parishes (freguesias):

- Graça
- Pedrógão Grande
- Vila Facaia

== See also ==
- 2017 Portugal wildfires
