= Antioxidants (journal) =

- Discipline: Biochemistry
- Language: English
- Edited by: Stanley Omaye

Publication details
- History: 2012–present
- Publisher: MDPI
- Frequency: Continuous
- Open access: Yes
- License: Creative Commons Attribution License
- Impact factor: 7.675 (2021)

Standard abbreviations
- ISO 4: Antioxidants

Indexing
- CODEN: ANTIGE
- ISSN: 2076-3921
- OCLC no.: 862392423

Links
- Journal homepage

Antioxidants is a peer-reviewed open-access scientific journal that covers various areas of antioxidants research, including biosynthesis, pharmacodynamics, and synthetic antioxidants. It is published by MDPI and was established in 2012. The editor-in-chief is Stanley Omaye (University of Nevada).

The journal publishes original research articles, review articles, and short communications.

== Abstracting and indexing ==
The journal is abstracted and indexed in:

- EBSCO databases
- ProQuest databases
- Science Citation Index Expanded
- Scopus

According to the Journal Citation Reports, the journal has a 2021 impact factor of 7.675.
