= Domingos Duarte Lima =

Portuguese politician (born 1955)

Domingos Duarte Lima (born November 20, 1955) is a Portuguese lawyer and politician. He was a deputy of the Assembleia da República from 1983 to 1995, from 1998 to 2002, and again from 2005 to 2009. He was also vice-president of the National Political Committee of the party where he is affiliated, the PSD, from 1989 to 1991, and was the leader of the party's Parliamentary Group at the Assembleia da República, from 1991 to 1994. He has also been a noted musician, organist and singer, as well as a conductor of the choir of his alma mater, the Universidade Católica Portuguesa.

== Early life ==
Duarte Lima was born in Peso da Régua, northern Portugal. He was the fifth of nine children; their parents were Adérito Lima, an electric power company employee, and Maria de Jesus, a trader. Very inclined to music, he learnt to play the organ in the majestic setting of the cathedral of Miranda do Douro, where the family was then residing. With the death of his father due to cancer when Duarte Lima was only 11 years old, he was pressured to combine studies with work, since his mother, Maria de Jesus, was then left alone with their large offspring. He then begun a career in the real estate business of his uncle Júlio, thriving rapidly. In the meanwhile he left his mother's house to finish his high school studies in Liceu D. Pedro V at Lisbon, the capital city of Portugal. He was there when the Carnation Revolution took place in April 1974. After the revolution he became a member of the PSD, a political party, and enrolls in the Universidade Católica Portuguesa (UCP) in order to study law. In 1983 he became a member of the Portuguese Parliament, the Assembleia da República, for the first time. With the rise of Aníbal Cavaco Silva to the leadership of PSD, Duarte Lima becomes a noted personality of the party, reaching the capacity of parliamentary leader of PSD. He was awarded a degree in 1986 by the UCP. Even before graduation he married Alexina Lima de Deus and starts to invest in the stock exchange, from where he would reportedly earn a considerable amount of money. An increasingly well known personality in Portuguese politics, Duarte Lima was subjected to heavy media exposure in 1994 when the weekly newspaper O Independente, then directed by Paulo Portas, devoted a lot of headlines to Duarte Lima casting doubt on his alleged sudden enrichment. Calls for an investigation to the Attorney General's Office, did not find criminal evidence, but did not explain the source of such huge income in Duarte Lima's bank accounts.

== Political career ==
Duarte Lima was awarded a degree in law by the Universidade Católica Portuguesa (UCP) in 1986, and embraced a career as a lawyer and politician. He was a deputy of the Assembleia da República from 1983 to 1995, from 1998 to 2002, and again from 2005 to 2009. He was also vice-president of the National Political Committee of the party where he is affiliated, the PSD, from 1989 to 1991, and was the leader of the party's Parliamentary Group at the Assembleia da República, from 1991 to 1994, before José Pacheco Pereira had been appointed in 1994.

== Health issues ==
After the O Independente controversial claims had started to fade away, he was diagnosed in 1998 with acute myeloid leukemia, the worst form of the disease with a survival rate below 40%. With multiple admissions to hospital, he survived the disease and received a bone marrow transplant from one of his brothers. During the treatments, he installed an organ in the hospital room that he occupied at the Portuguese Institute of Oncology (IPO) in Lisbon, using headphones to avoid disturbing other patients. Even today, it is the largest object ever sterilized for a patient in the IPO. Duarte Lima recovered and became one of the founders of the Portuguese Association Against Leukemia.

== Personal life ==
Duarte Lima is divorced from Alexina Lima de Deus, with whom he has a son, Pedro Miguel. In the 1980s he started to develop an interest for stock investing that would reportedly make him earn a considerable amount of money (about 400,000 euros in 1987 alone). In the late 1990s, he survived leukemia, and after that became one of the founders of the APCL - Associação Portuguesa Contra a Leucemia (Portuguese Association Against Leukemia). He was also appointed a member of the ethical commission of the Instituto Português de Oncologia (IPO), Portuguese oncology hospitals, at Lisbon. After had overcome leukemia, Duarte Lima remarried to Paula, a former secretary. He is also a noted musician who studied at the Instituto Gregoriano de Lisboa (Gregorian Institute of Lisbon), organist and singer of the Igreja de São João de Deus (a church), in Lisbon, and a conductor of the choir of the Universidade Católica Portuguesa.

== Alleged murderer of Rosalina Ribeiro ==
Rosalina Ribeiro was the secretary and lover of Portuguese industrialist Tomás Feteira for about 30 years. Tomás Feteira died in 2000. In December 2009, Rosalina was murdered in Brazil, near Saquarema, Rio de Janeiro. According to the Portuguese newspaper i, a complaint against Duarte Lima was filed by Feteira's heirs, related to the fate of the money from the legacy of the Portuguese millionaire. Money was in Switzerland and had been transferred to Duarte Lima's bill by Rosalina Ribeiro. The daughter of Tomás Feteira, Olímpia Feteira, the Portuguese businessman who died ten years before and whose fortune had been partly diverted by the former secretary and companion murdered at the end of 2009, in Brazil, said that the lawyer Domingos Duarte Lima had received in 2001, in five transfers, more than 5.2 million Euros. Rosalina Ribeiro lost an action in a Brazilian court, where she claimed part of the fortune on the grounds that she lived maritally with the businessman. However, the court dismissed her claims. The daughter of the businessman wanted since then to know why the father's accounts were handled by his former secretary and questioned the fate of the money that should exceed 30 million euros. On December 7, 2009, Duarte Lima, who represented Rosalina Ribeiro, moved to Rio de Janeiro to have a working meeting with her. In principle they would handle issues related to the assets of the former secretary. They dined together, and 15 minutes after they separated in a deserted spot where Rosalina requested to be taken. The woman, who was 74 years old, was eventually shot. She died with two bullets in the chest and one in the head. The gun used was a .38 caliber revolver. Duarte Lima stated that only came to have knowledge of the death of Rosalina on December 21, 2009, at a time that he was already in London and was preparing to travel to Hong Kong.

On Thursday, 27 October 2011, Duarte Lima was formally accused of the murder of Rosalina Ribeiro by the Public Ministry of Rio de Janeiro, Brazil.

== BPN-related fraud accusations ==
Duarte Lima and his son Pedro were arrested on November 17, 2011, by the Polícia Judiciária, due to allegations of fraud, money laundering and fiscal fraud in the larger Banco Português de Negócios (BPN) scandal. The arrest is related to a purchase of land in Oeiras Municipality that would be for the construction of the Portuguese Institute of Oncology (IPO), and involves a 44 million euros lending.
