= Dom Pedro V Theatre =

Theatre and cinema in Macau, China

Coordinates: 22.191573°N 113.537302°E

- 伯多祿五世劇院; Teatro Dom Pedro V
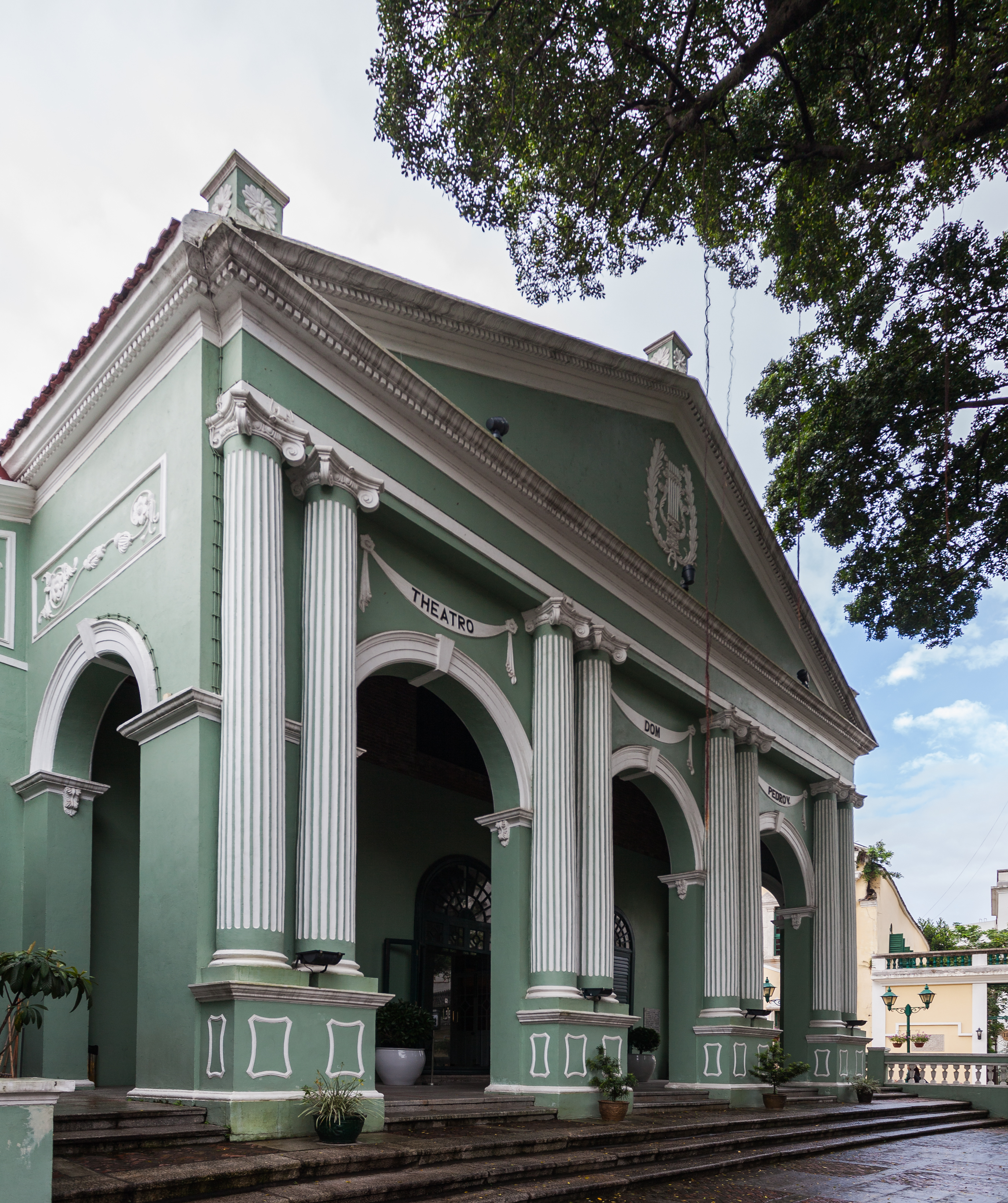
- Interactive map of Dom Pedro V Theatre
- Address: Largo de Santo Agostinho
- Location: São Lourenço, Macau,
- Type: Theatre

Construction
- Built: 1860

The Dom Pedro V Theatre (Chinese: 伯多祿五世劇院; Portuguese: Teatro Dom Pedro V) is a historical theatre situated at Largo de Santo Agostinho in São Lourenço, Macau, China. It is one of the first western-style theatres in East Asia. The theater is an important landmark in the region and remains a venue for important public events and celebrations today.

== History ==
The theatre was built in 1860 by the local Portuguese to commemorate their reigning king, Peter V. It used to be a regular meeting place for the Portuguese and Macanese people living in Macau. Its current façade was added in 1873. The theater was used as a refugee shelter in the World War II. In 2005, the theater became one of the designated sites of the Historic Centre of Macau enlisted on the UNESCO World Heritage List. In August 2017, the portico ceiling of the theater was damaged due to Typhoon Hato.

== Architecture ==
The theater is neo-classical in design, incorporating a portico front on a rectilinear plan. The building is 41.5 metres long and 22 metres wide. Apart from being a theatre, it features a ballroom, a study room, and a billiard room.

- Hosted the Italian opera Madama Butterfly's premiere in Asia.
- Undergone various reconstructions throughout its history. It discontinued operating and was left unused for almost two decades due to structural corrosion by termites before reopened in 1993 after large scale renovations.

== See also ==
- Dom Pedro
- List of oldest buildings and structures in Macau
