= Avelar =

- Civil parish
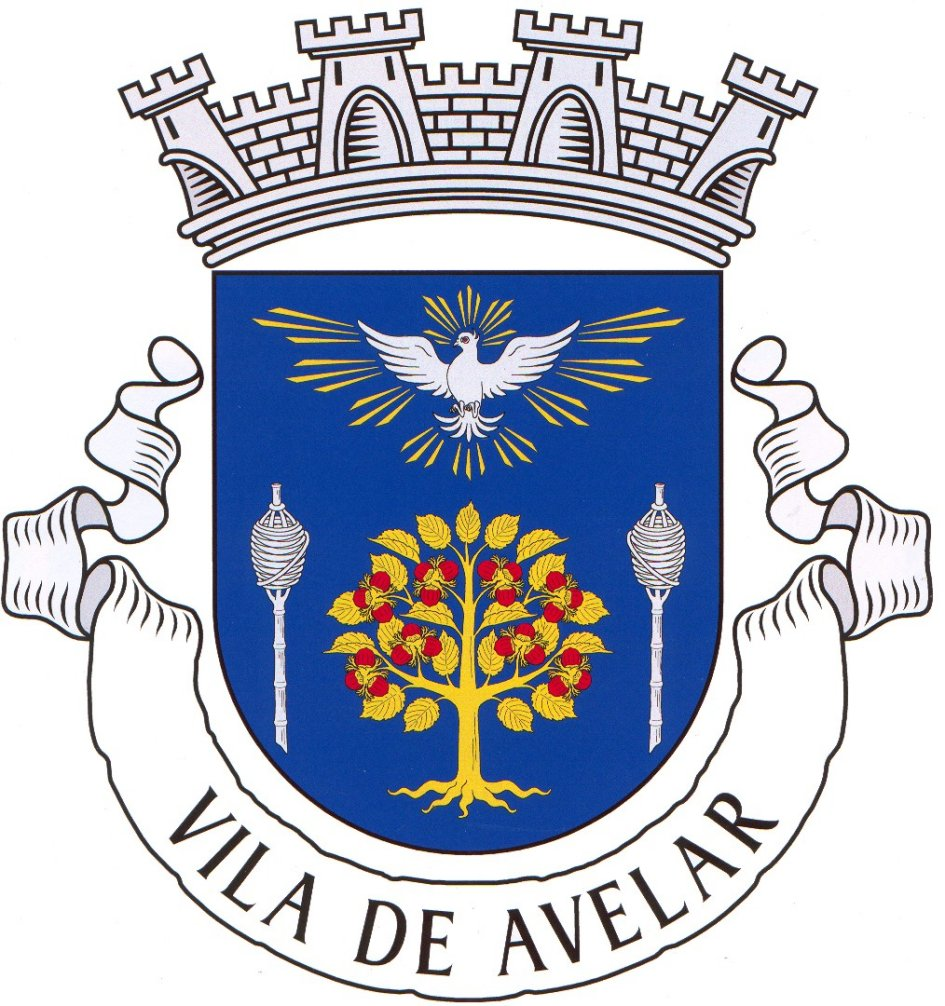
- Coat of arms

- Location in Portugal
- Coordinates: 39°55′24.39″N 8°21′25.82″W
- Country: Portugal
- Region: Centro
- Intermunic. comm.: Região de Leiria
- District: Leiria
- Municipality: Ansião

Area
  - Total: 8.5 km^{2} (3.3 sq mi)

Population (2011)
  - Total: 1,929
  - Density: 230/km^{2} (590/sq mi)
- Time zone: UTC+00:00 (WET)
  - Summer (DST): UTC+01:00 (WEST)
- Website: avelar.freguesia.pt

Avelar (1930–2013)

Climate chart (precipitation, max. and min. temperature)
J	F	M	A	M	J	J	A	S	O	N	D
115 10 8	107 10 9	97 13 11	78 14 13	66 17 15	33 20 19	10 22 21	12 23 22	48 21 19	97 17 16	103 13 12	118 10 8
- █ Average max. and min. temperatures in °C
- █ Precipitation totals in mm
- Source: "ClimateCharts.net". Technical University of Dresden.
Imperial conversion
J	F	M	A	M	J	J	A	S	O	N	D
4.5 49 47	4.2 50 48	3.8 55 52	3.1 58 55	2.6 63 59	1.3 69 66	0.4 72 71	0.5 73 71	1.9 70 67	3.8 62 60	4.1 55 53	4.6 51 47
- █ Average max. and min. temperatures in °F
- █ Precipitation totals in inches

Avelar is a civil parish of the municipality of Ansião, Portugal. It was a vila during two occasions: for the first time from November 12, 1514, through December 31, 1836; and for the second time from June 21, 1995, to the present day.

== Etymology ==
The name avelar is said to come from the Latin avellanale or avellanal, related to hazels (Corylus avellana).

The name was later appended to the town as a result of the Jewish expulsions from Spain (1391, 1492) and the subsequent resettlement of Jews in Portugal.

== History ==
=== Antiquity ===
An old Roman pathway connecting Conímbriga (modern day Condeixa) to Sellium (modern day Tomar) passed through the location of modern-day Avelar.

=== Medieval history ===
The first known reference to Avelar is from the year 1137, when Afonso Henriques (not yet King of Portugal) cites an "Avellaal" on the foral granted to Penela. In May 1219, King Sancho I granted Queen Maria Paes Ribeiro an estate in Almofala.

In November 1221, King Afonso II, the grandson of Afonso I, gave the Avelar estate to Martim Anes, his alferes-mor (the standard-bearer of the Portuguese military of the time).

=== Renaissance and early modern history ===
In November 1497, King Manuel I names Fernão de Pina, Rui Boto and João Façanha as officials of the Forals of the Court, with the intention of starting a reform of the old forals. Seventeen years later, on November 12, 1514, Avelar was granted its foral, officially declaring it a town (vila). At that time, Avelar together with its boundering villages, had a total of 88 people in population.

Then came the Portuguese succession crisis of 1580 and, with it, the Iberian Union. The union ended with the Portuguese Restoration War, but the Marquesses of Vila Real, then owners of the Avelar estate, supported the right of the Spanish Kings to the Portuguese throne. Because of this, King John IV of Portugal accused them of treason, and had their properties and riches confiscated, including the Avelar estate. Those confiscated goods were later passed on to the House of the Infantado, created by King John IV himself as an appanage for the second eldest son of the Portuguese monarch.

On December 31, 1836, due to a royal decree, Avelar lost its title of vila and became part of the concelho of Chão de Couce until 1855. It then becomes part of the concelho of Figueiró dos Vinhos. In 1895, it finally becomes part of the concelho of Ansião, of which it remains to this day. This timeline, however, is disputed: other sources list Avelar as being a part of Figueiró dos Vinhos in as early as 1832 (adding to the confusion, the term used to refer to Figueiró dos Vinhos is "district", but districts were only officially defined in April 1835).

=== Modern history ===
In May 1994, a bill was presented to the Assembly of the Republic elevating Avelar back to the status of a vila. On June 21, 1995, the bill was accepted and Avelar regained its position. Since 2018, the town celebrates the anniversary of this event during the "Vila of Avelar Week".

In 2020, the III Vila of Avelar Week was scheduled to take place from the 14 to the 21 of June, but was ultimately cancelled due to the COVID-19 pandemic. Instead, the celebration was shortened to a single, brief "Day of Vila of Avelar" public meeting on June 21, taking necessary precautions to prevent further spread of the virus.

== Population ==
Historical population

Year	Pop.	±%
1864	828	—
1878	890	+7.5%
1890	957	+7.5%
1900	1,013	+5.9%
1911	1,143	+12.8%
1920	1,154	+1.0%
1930	1,309	+13.4%
1940	1,480	+13.1%

Year	Pop.	±%
1950	1,528	+3.2%
1960	1,566	+2.5%
1970 (est.)	1,730	+10.5%
1981	2,083	+20.4%
1991	1,958	−6.0%
2011	2,169	+10.8%
2021	1,929	−11.1%

Source: Instituto Nacional de Estatística (INE)

== Administration ==
=== Executive body ===
As of February 2020, the president of the executive body of Avelar (Junta de Freguesia) is Fernando Inácio Pires Medeiros.

=== Legislative body ===
As of February 2020, president of Avelar's legislature (Assembleia de Freguesia) is Dina Maria Caseiro Henriques Rosa, of the Social Democratic Party.

== See also ==
- Avella, a town in southern Italy.
