= Sendim e Atenor =

- Civil parish
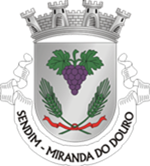
- Coat of arms

- Location in Portugal
- Coordinates: 41.387°N 6.427°W
- Country: Portugal
- Region: Norte
- Intermunic. comm.: Terras de Trás-os-Montes
- District: Bragança
- Municipality: Miranda do Douro

Area
  - Total: 58.93 km^{2} (22.75 sq mi)

Population (2011)
  - Total: 1,487
  - Density: 25.23/km^{2} (65.35/sq mi)
- Time zone: UTC+00:00 (WET)
  - Summer (DST): UTC+01:00 (WEST)

Sendim e Atenor (Portuguese pronunciation: [sẽˈdĩ ˈi ɐ.tɨˈnɔɾ]) (Mirandese: Sendin i Atanor, Mirandese pronunciation: [s̺ə̃ˈdĩŋ ˈi a.taˈnoɾ(ɪ)], Local Sendinese pronunciation: [s̺ẽˈdɨ̃j̃ŋ ˈi a.taˈnoɾ(ɪ)]) is a civil parish in the municipality of Miranda do Douro, Portugal. It was formed in 2013 by the merger of the former parishes Sendim and Atenor. The population in 2011 was 1,487, in an area of 58.93 km^{2}. Sendim is in the area where the rare Mirandese language, related to Leonese, is spoken and co-official with Portuguese.

== See also ==
- Eremitério Os Santos
