= List of hydroelectric power stations in Portugal =

The following is a list of hydroelectric power stations in Portugal.

== List ==
Name	River	District	Commissioned	Capacity (MW)	Annual generation (GWh)	Type of dam	Height (m)	Length (m)	Volume (m³)	Normal elevation (m)	Surface area (km^{2})	Total capacity (Mio. m³)
Aguieira (Note: This is a pumped-storage hydroelectric power station. The capacity marked with "P" consists of pump turbines.)	Mondego	Coimbra	1981	336 P	209.9	Arch	89	400	365,000	117	20	423
Alqueva	Guadiana	Beja	2004; 2013	259.2 P 260 P	269; 470	Arch	96	458	687,000	152	250	4,150
Alto Lindoso	Limia	Viana do Castelo	1992	630 P	933.8	Arch	110	297	308,500	338	1.05	379
Alto Rabagão	Rabagão	Vila Real	1964	68 P	85.2	Arch	94	1,970	1,117,000	880	22.12	568.69
Andorinhas	Ave	Braga	1945	8.8	19	Gravity	25	103.5	12,000	185.7	0.21	1.2
Arade	Arade	Faro	1956		1.35	Embankment	50	246	654,000	61	1.82	28.389
Belver	Tagus	Portalegre	1952	80.7	220	Gravity	30	327.5	90,000	46.15	2.86	12.5
Bemposta	Douro	Bragança	1964	431	1.058	Arch	87	297	316,000	402	4.05	129
Bouçã	Zêzere	Leiria	1955	50	153.2	Arch	63	175	70,000	175	5	48.4
Bouçoais-Sonim	Rabaçal	Vila Real	2004	10	30	Gravity	43	87	19,500	334	0.0153	1.365
Cabril	Zêzere	Leiria	1954	108	304.8	Arch	132	290	360,000	294	20.23	720
Caldeirão	Caldeirão	Guarda	1993	40	48.7	Arch	39	122	26,000	702	0.66	5.52
Caniçada	Cávado	Braga	1955	62	337.4	Arch	76	246	90,000	162	6.89	170.6
Carrapatelo	Douro	Porto	1971	201	806.1	Gravity	57	400	190,000	46.5	9.52	148.4
Castelo do Bode	Zêzere	Santarém	1951	159	396.5	Arch-gravity	115	402	430,000	121	32.91	1,095
Catapereiro	Teja	Guarda	1999	4		Gravity	37.5	134.4		427.5	0.435	4.0853
Cercosa	Alfusqueiro	Viseu	1994	3.923	9.65	Gravity	15.7	72		371	0.02	0.06
Covão do Ferro	Alforfa	Cast. Branco	1956	1,2	2,4	Gravity	32,5	400	111.000	1,573.4	0.065	1.1
Crestuma–Lever	Douro	Porto	1985	117	360	Gravity	25.5	470	205,000	13	12.98	110
Frades II			2017	880 / 780 P						420		
Fratel	Tejo	Portalegre	1973	132	357.9	Gravity	48	240	124,000	74	10	92.5
Freigil	Cabrum	Viseu	1955	4.6	10.3	Gravity	17	73		317	0.033	0.14
Gameiro	Raia	Évora	1960	0.46	0.54	Embankment gravity	20	293	39,000; 11,000	62	0.072	1.3
Guilhofrei	Ave	Braga	1938	4.6 (Guilho.); 10 (Ermal)	11; 29	Gravity	49	190	55,000	333.3	1.63	21.2
Idanha	Pônsul	Cast. Branco	1947	2.5	4.5	Gravity	51	143	66,000	255.5	6.78	78.1
Lagoa Comprida	Lagoa	Guarda	1966	0.6 (Lagoa.); 12.8 (Sabug.)	1.7; 48	Gravity	29	1,200	100,000	1,600	0.75	13.8
Maranhão	Seda	Portalegre	1957	2	3	Embankment	55	204	592,000	130	19.6	205.4
Miranda	Douro	Bragança	1960	369	897.8	Buttress	80	263	240,000	528.05	1.22	28.1
Montargil	Sor	Portalegre	1958		5.9	Embankment	48	427	858,000	80	16.46	164.3
Nunes	Tuela	Bragança	1995	9.9	41.56	Arch-gravity	21.5	65.5		535.5		0.138
Odeáxere	Odeáxere	Faro	1958	0.61	1	Arch	41	150		84.1	2.85	34.825
Paradela	Cávado	Vila Real	1956	54	256.7	CFRD	112	540	2,700,000	740	3.8	164.4
Pedrógão	Guadiana	Beja	2005	10	45	Gravity	43	448	340,000	84.80	11.04	106
Pego do Altar	Alcáçovas	Setúbal	1949	2	3	CFRD	63	192	371,000	52.26	6.55	94
Penide	Cávado	Braga	1951	4.872	22.3	Masonry	21	51	9,000	16.7	0.69	0.5
Picote	Douro	Bragança	1958; 2011	195; 246	868.6; 244	Arch	100	139	205,000	471	2.44	63
Pocinho	Douro	Guarda	1982	186	408.4	Gravity	49	430	120,000	125.5	8.29	83
Poio	Nisa	Portalegre	1932	1.5	4.8	Gravity	18	278	8,000		1.1	6.4
Póvoa	Nisa	Portalegre	1928	0.8	2.1	Gravity	32	400	32,000	312	2.36	22
Pracana	Ocreza	Santarém	1950	41	63.8	Buttress	60	245.5	144,000	114	5.5	111.9
Raiva	Mondego	Coimbra	1981	24	44.9	Gravity	36	200	85,000	61.5	2.3	24.11
Rebordelo	Rabaçal	Bragança	2004	8.75	24	Gravity	35.5	127	19,000	380	0.46	3.13
Régua	Douro	Vila Real	1973	156	738	Gravity	41	350	108.000		8,5	95
Salamonde	Cávado	Braga	1953; 2015	42; 244 / 207 P	231.2; 386	Arch	75	284	93,000	280.5	2.42	65
Santa Clara	Mira	Beja	1968		1.9	Embankment	87	428	3,966,000	130	19.86	485
Santa Luzia	Unhais	Coimbra	1942	25.888	54	Arch	76	115	80,000	656	2.46	53.7
Senhora de Monforte	Côa	Guarda	1993	10	32.9	Gravity	20	78	6,800	435	0.023	0.0873
Serra Serrada	Andorinhas	Bragança	1989	3.4	8.71	Gravity	25	170	14,600	1,252	0.2647	1.68
Sordo	Sordo	Vila Real	1997	10	25	Gravity	36	108	35,000	522.5	0.084	1
Torrão	Tâmega	Porto	1988	140 P	222.3	Gravity	69	218	224,415	65	6.5	124
Touvedo	Limia	Viana do Castelo	1993	22	66.8	Gravity	42.5	133.5	74,620	50	1.72	15.5
Vale do Gaio	Xarrama	Setúbal	1949	1.02	1.2	Embankment	51	368	636,000	40.5	5.5	63
Valeira	Douro	Viseu	1975	240	610.7	Gravity	48	380	220,000	105	7.95	97
Varosa	Varosa	Viseu	1934	25	60	Arch	76	213	81,000	264	0.7	12.943
Venda Nova	Rabagão	Braga	1951; 2004; 2015	90; 194.2 P 746 P	383.9; 220; 1,441	Arch-gravity	97	230	228,000	700	4	94.5
Vilar	Távora	Viseu	1965	58	137.6	Embankment	58	240	300,000	552	6.7	99.75
Vilarinho das Furnas	Homem	Braga	1972; 1987	67,7; 73,6 P	189	Arch	94	385	294,000	569.5	3.46	117.69

== See also ==
- List of power stations in Portugal
- List of dams and reservoirs in Portugal
