= List of dams and reservoirs in Portugal =

This page is a list of dams and reservoirs in Portugal, arranged by NUTS Regions and Subregions:

== Norte ==
=== Alto Tâmega ===
- Alto Tâmega Dam
- Daivões Dam
- Gouvães Dam

=== Cávado ===
- Caniçada Dam, Parada do Bouro, Vieira do Minho
- Salamonde Dam, Salamonde, Vieira do Minho
- Vilarinho das Furnas Dam, Campo do Gerês, Terras de Bouro

=== Douro ===
- Cuerda del Pozo Dam
- Los Rábanos Dam
- San José Dam
- Villalcampo Dam
- Castro Dam
- Miranda Dam
- Picote Dam
- Bemposta Dam
- Aldeadávila Dam
- Saucelle Dam
- Pocinho Dam
- Valeira Dam São João da Pesqueira, São João da Pesqueira
- Régua Dam
- Carrapatelo Dam, Santa Cristina, Mesão Frio
- Crestuma–Lever Dam
- Bagaúste Dam, Peso da Régua, Peso da Régua

=== Grande Porto ===
- Crestuma–Lever Dam, Foz do Sousa, Gondomar

=== Minho-Lima ===
- Alto Lindoso Dam, Lindoso, Ponte da Barca

== Centro ==
=== Beiras e Serra da Estrela ===
- Sabugal Dam, Sabugal, Sabugal
- Barragem Marques da Silva, Seia

=== Beira Baixa ===
- Cabril Dam, Sertã
- Fratel Dam, Vila Velha de Ródão
- Barragem da Marateca Castelo Branco, Portugal
- Marechal Carmona Dam, Idanha-a-Nova

=== Coimbra ===
- Aguieira Dam, Penacova
- Santa Luzia Dam, Pampilhosa da Serra

=== Médio Tejo ===
- Pracana Dam, Mação

== Lisboa e Vale do Tejo ==
- Castelo de Bode Dam, São Pedro de Tomar, Tomar

== Alentejo ==
=== Alto Alentejo ===
- Belver Dam, Belver, Gavião
- Maranhão Dam, Maranhão, Avis

=== Alentejo Central ===
- Alqueva Dam, Alqueva, Portel

=== Alentejo Litoral ===
- Santa Clara-a-Velha Dam, Santa Clara-a-Velha, Odemira

=== Baixo Alentejo ===
- Capela Dam, Peroguarda, Ferreira do Alentejo
- Castelo Ventoso Dam, Ferreira do Alentejo, Ferreira do Alentejo
- Marmelo Dam, Ferreira do Alentejo, Ferreira do Alentejo
- Sequeiro Dam, Canhestros, Ferreira do Alentejo

== Algarve ==
- Fonte Coberta Dam, São Sebastião, Lagos
- Bravura Dam, Odiaxere, Lagos
- Odelouca River Dam, Silves
- Ribeira do Arade Dam, Silves, Silves

== See also ==
- List of hydroelectric power stations in Portugal
