= Alto Rabagão Dam =

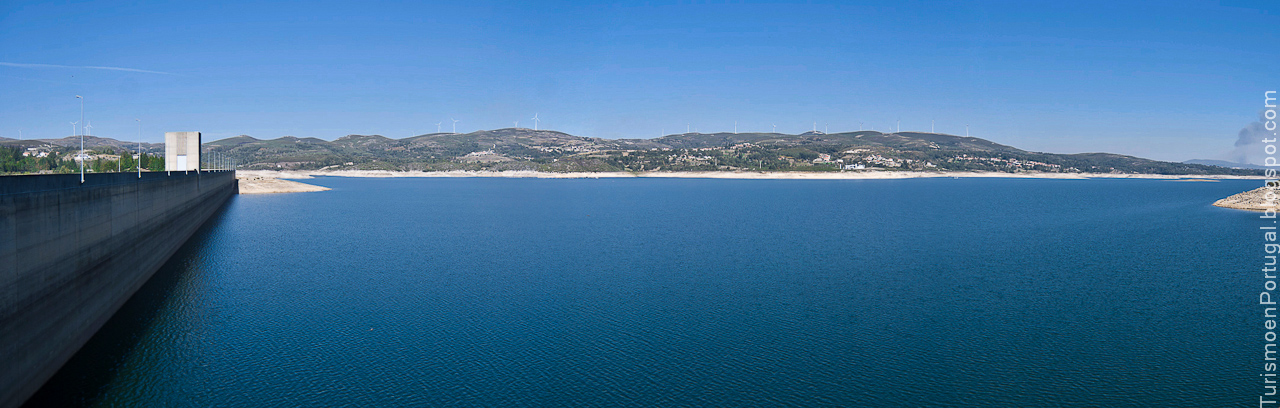

- Location within Portugal
- Official name: Barragem do Alto Rabagão
- Location: municipality Montalegre, Vila Real District, Portugal
- Coordinates: 41°44′22.2″N 7°51′27.4″W
- Purpose: Power, water supply
- Status: Operational
- Construction began: 1957
- Opening date: 1964
- Owner: Companhia Portuguesa de Produção de Electricidade

Dam and spillways
- Type of dam: Concrete arch and gravity dam
- Impounds: Rabagão River
- Height (foundation): 94 m (308 ft)
- Length: 1,970 m (6,460 ft)
- Elevation at crest: 880 m (2,890 ft)
- Dam volume: 1,117,000 m^{3} (39,400,000 cu ft)
- Spillway type: Over the dam
- Spillway capacity: 500 m^{3} (18,000 cu ft)

Reservoir
- Total capacity: 568,690,000 m^{3} (461,040 acre⋅ft)
- Active capacity: 557,920,000 m^{3} (452,310 acre⋅ft)
- Surface area: 22.12 km^{2} (8.54 mi^{2})
- Normal elevation: 880 m (2,890 ft)

Alto Rabagão Power Plant
- Coordinates: 41°42′37.13″N 7°55′0.70″W
- Operator: Energias de Portugal
- Commission date: 1964
- Type: Pumped-storage
- Hydraulic head: 185 m (607 ft) (max)
- Turbines: 2 x 36.75 MW reversible Francis-type
- Installed capacity: 68 MW
- Annual generation: 85.2 GWh

Alto Rabagão Dam (Portuguese: Barragem do Alto Rabagão) is a concrete dam on the Rabagão River, a left tributary of the Cávado River. It is located in Peneda-Gerês National Park, in the municipality Montalegre, in Vila Real District, Portugal.

Construction of the dam began in 1957. The emplacement made a classical design impossible following the French expert Andre Coyne. The stability of the non-conventional dam design was checked by numerical simulation by Engineer Antonio Correia de Sousa of the Companhia de Electricidade do Alto Rabagao in collaboration with a team from IBM-Belgium. This was the first time numerical simulations were used for the design of a dam. The dam was completed in 1964. It is owned by Companhia Portuguesa de Produção de Electricidade (CPPE). The dam is used for power production.

== Dam ==
Alto Rabagão Dam is a 94 m tall (height above foundation) and 1,970 m long concrete dam, which is composed of an arch dam in the center and gravity dams on both sides. Its crest altitude is 880 m. The volume of the dam is 1,117,000 m^{3}. The dam contains a crest spillway with 2 gates (maximum discharge 500 m^{3}/s) and a bottom outlet (maximum discharge 360 m^{3}/s).

== Reservoir ==
At full reservoir level of 880 m (maximum flood level of 880.1 m) the reservoir of the dam has a surface area of 22.12 km^{2} and its total capacity is 568.69 mio. m^{3}. Its active capacity is 557.92 (550 or 550.1) mio. m^{3}. Minimum operating level is 829 m. With the 550.1 mio. m^{3} water 973.1 GWh can be produced.

== Power plant ==
The pumped-storage hydroelectric power plant went operational in 1964. It is owned by CPPE, but operated by EDP. The plant has a nameplate capacity of 68 (72) MW. Its average annual generation is 85.2 (83 95 or 97) GWh.

The power station is located downstream and contains 2 reversible Francis turbine-generators with 36.75 MW (45 MVA), each in an underground powerhouse. The turbine rotation is 428 rpm. The minimum hydraulic head is 129 m, the maximum 185 m. Maximum flow per turbine is 25.7 m^{3}/s. When pumping, each of the pumps has a maximum energy consumption of 31.7 MW and can pump 18 m^{3}/s. The pumps are operated independently of the Francis turbines.

As lower reservoir for Alto Rabagão the reservoir of Venda Nova Dam is used.

== See also ==
- List of power stations in Portugal
- List of dams and reservoirs in Portugal
