= Caniçada Dam =

Dam in Norte, Portugal

Caniçada Dam (Hydroelectric Dam of Cávado-Caniçada)
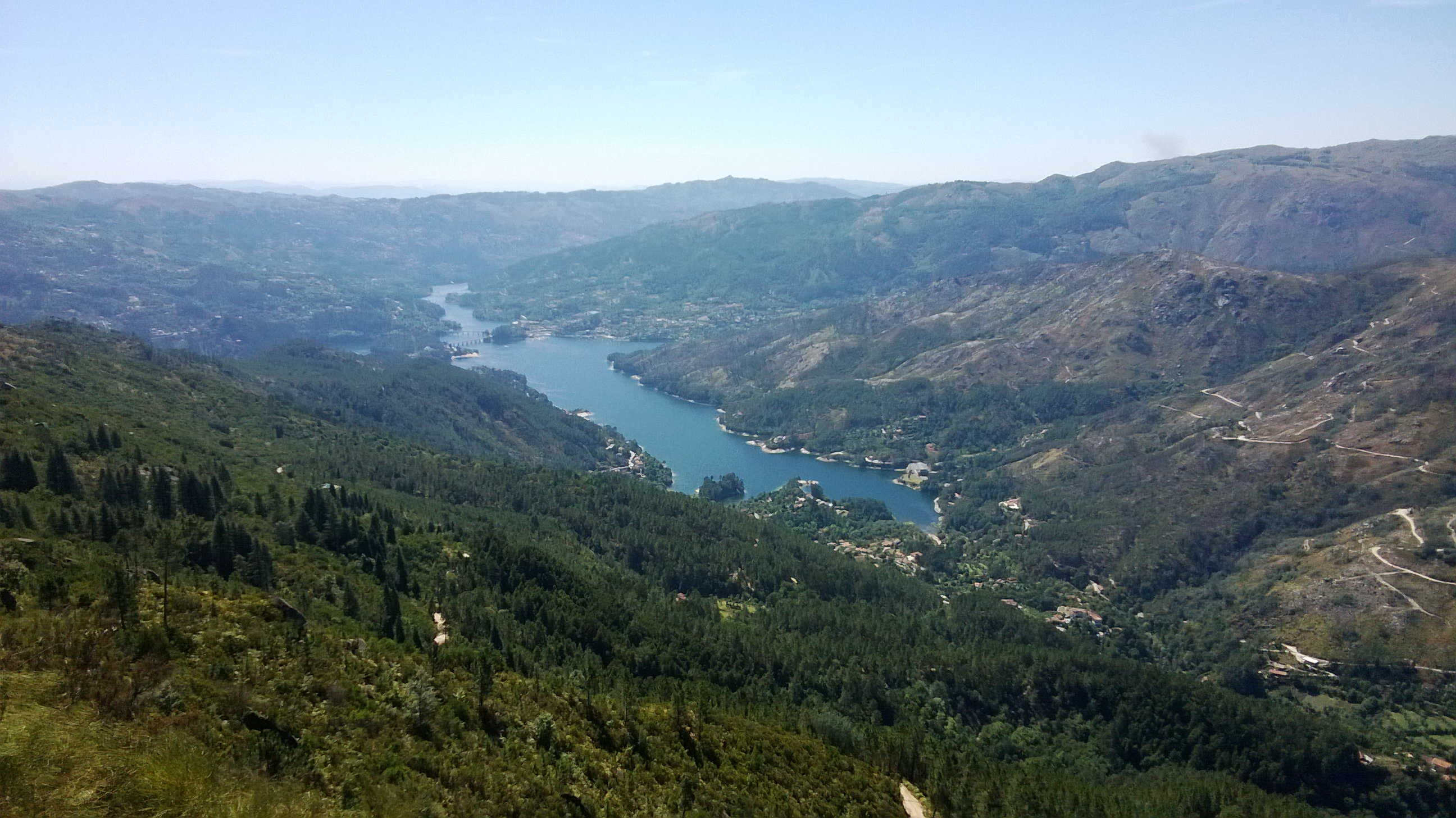

- Location within Portugal
- Official name: Barragem da Caniçada/HICA-Hidroeléctrica do Cávado-Caniçada
- Location: Braga, Vieira do Minho, Parada do Bouro
- Coordinates: 41°39′10.8″N 8°13′51.6″W
- Purpose: Power
- Status: Operational
- Opening date: 1955
- Owner: Companhia Portuguesa de Produção de Electricidade

Dam and spillways
- Type of dam: Concrete arch dam
- Impounds: Cávado River
- Height (foundation): 76 m (249 ft)
- Length: 246 m (807 ft)
- Elevation at crest: 163 m (535 ft)
- Dam volume: 90,000 m^{3} (3,200,000 cu ft)
- Spillway type: Over the dam
- Spillway capacity: 1,700 m^{3}/s (1.4 acre⋅ft/s)

Reservoir
- Total capacity: 170,600,000 m^{3} (138,300 acre⋅ft)
- Active capacity: 159,300,000 m^{3} (129,100 acre⋅ft)
- Surface area: 6.89 km^{2} (2.66 mi^{2})
- Normal elevation: 162 m (531 ft)

Power Station
- Operator: Energias de Portugal
- Commission date: 1954
- Hydraulic head: 121 m (397 ft) (max)
- Turbines: 2 x 31 MW Francis-type
- Installed capacity: 62 MW
- Annual generation: 337.4 GWh

The Caniçada Dam (Portuguese: Barragem da Caniçada/HICA-Hidroeléctrica do Cávado-Caniçada; Portuguese pronunciation: [bɐˈʁaʒɐ̃j dɐ kɐniˈsaðɐ]) is a concrete arch dam on the Cávado River, the civil parish of Parada do Bouro, in the municipality of Vieira do Minho, in the Portuguese Norte (district of Braga). It is owned by Companhia Portuguesa de Produção de Electricidade (CPPE).

== History ==
The dam was completed and began functioning in 1955.

In 196, approval was obtained to begin a program of observation of the dam, as proposed by the Laboratório Nacional de Engenharia Civil (Civil Engineering National Laboratory).

== Architecture ==
Caniçada Dam is a 76 metres (249 ft) tall (height above foundation) and 246 metres (807 ft) long arch dam with a crest altitude of 163 metres (535 ft). The volume of the dam is 90,000 cubic metres (3,200,000 ft^{3}). The dam features a spillway with 4 gates over the dam with a maximum discharge 1,700 cubic metres per cubic foot (2,100,000 cu ft/m^{3}) per second, and one bottom outlet with maximum discharge 142 cubic metres (5,000 ft^{3}) per second.

=== Reservoir ===
At full reservoir level of 163 metres (535 ft) the reservoir of the dam has a surface area of 783 square kilometres (302 mi^{2}) of 6.89 (5.78) km^{2} and a total capacity of 170.6 mio. m³; its active capacity is 159.3 (144,4) mio. m³. With the 144,4 mio. m³ water 32 GWh can be produced.

=== Power plant ===
The hydroelectric power plant went operational in 1954. It is operated by EDP. The plant has a nameplate capacity of 62 (60 or 100) MW. Its average annual generation is 337.4 (283, 345 or 346) GWh. The power station contains 2 Francis turbine-generators with 31 MW (34 MVA) each in an underground powerhouse 134 m below the surface. The turbine rotation is 300 rpm. The minimum hydraulic head is 77 m, the maximum 121 m. Maximum flow per turbine is 34 m³/s. The turbines and generators were provided by Voith.

== See also ==
- List of power stations in Portugal
- List of dams and reservoirs in Portugal
