= Cávado =

Cávado may refer to:

- Cávado Subregion
- Cávado River
