= Picote =

Picote may refer to:

- Picote (Miranda do Douro), Portugal, a civil parish
- Picote Dam, Miranda do Douro
- Nebbiolo, an Italian wine grape variety also known as Picote

== See also ==
- François-Marie Picoté de Belestre (1716–1793), colonial soldier for both New France and Great Britain
- Picotee
