= Pracana Dam =

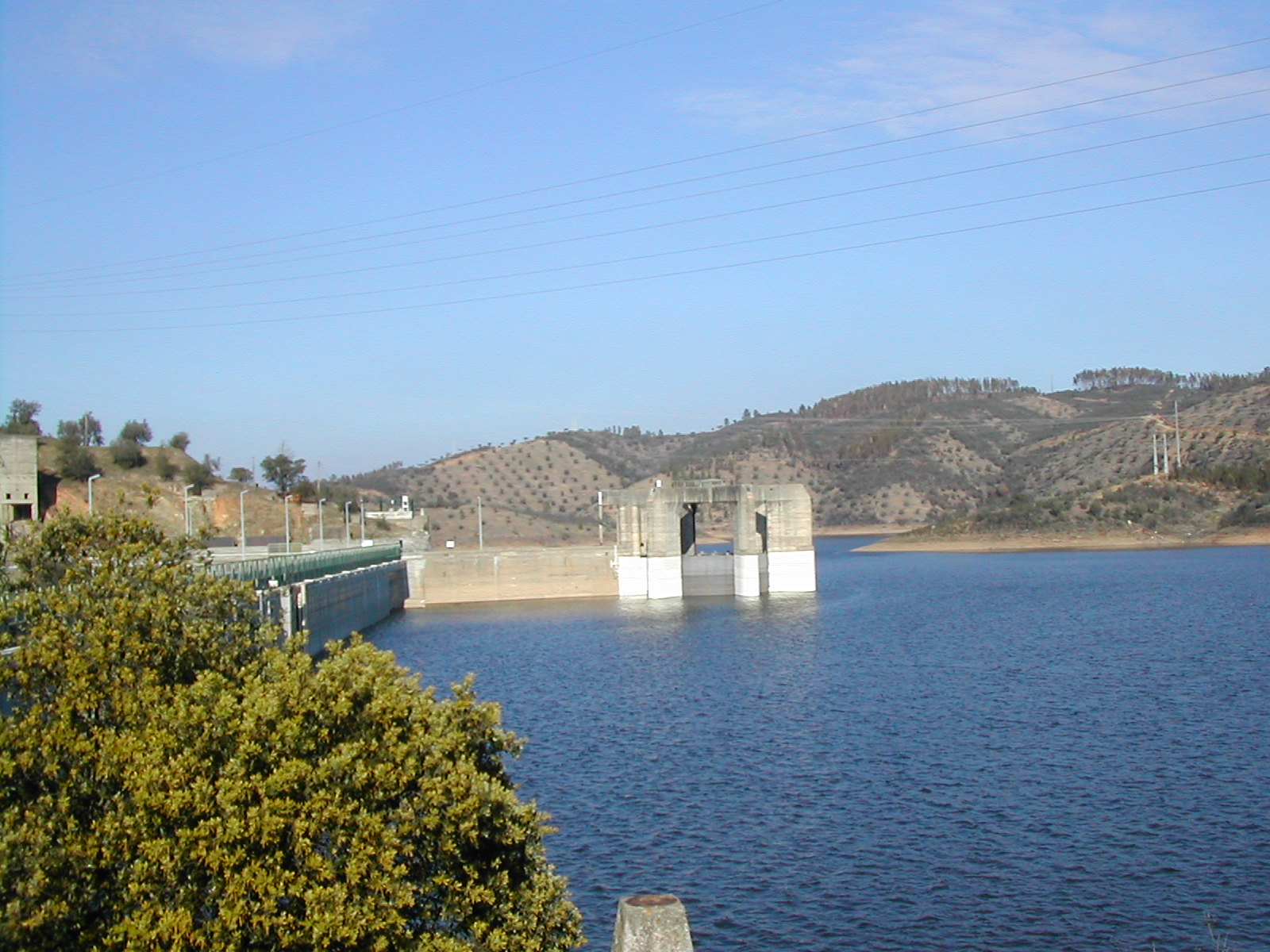

- Location within Portugal
- Official name: Barragem de Pracana
- Country: Portugal
- Location: municipality Mação, Santarém District
- Coordinates: 39°33′53.8″N 7°48′43.8″W
- Purpose: Power
- Status: Operational
- Construction began: 1947
- Opening date: 1950
- Owner: Companhia Portuguesa de Produção de Electricidade
- Operator: Energias de Portugal

Dam and spillways
- Type of dam: Concrete buttress dam
- Impounds: Ocreza
- Height (foundation): 60 m (200 ft)
- Length: 245.5 m (805 ft)
- Elevation at crest: 115 m (377 ft)
- Dam volume: 144,000 m^{3} (5,100,000 cu ft)
- Spillway type: Shaft and chute spillway
- Spillway capacity: 2,560 m^{3}/s (90,000 cu ft/s)

Reservoir
- Total capacity: 111,900,000 m^{3} (90,700 acre⋅ft)
- Active capacity: 69,000,000 m^{3} (56,000 acre⋅ft)
- Surface area: 5.5 km^{2} (2.1 mi^{2})
- Normal elevation: 114 m (374 ft)

Power Station
- Operator: Energias de Portugal
- Commission date: 1951
- Hydraulic head: 57 m (187 ft) (max)
- Turbines: 2 x 8 MW, 1 x 25 MW Francis-type
- Installed capacity: 41 MW
- Annual generation: 63.8 GWh

Pracana Dam (Portuguese: Barragem de Pracana) is a concrete buttress dam on the Ocreza, a right (northern) tributary of the Tagus. It is located in the municipality Mação, in Santarém District, Portugal.

Construction of the dam began in 1947. The dam was completed in 1950. It is owned by Companhia Portuguesa de Produção de Electricidade (CPPE). The dam is used for power generation.

== Dam ==
Pracana Dam is a 60 m tall (height above foundation) and 245.5 m long buttress dam with a crest altitude of 115 m. The volume of the dam is 144,000 m^{3}. There is one shaft spillway on the right side of the dam and a chute spillway on the left side. The combined maximum discharge is 2,560 m^{3}/s. There is also a bottom outlet which can discharge up to 52 m^{3}/s.

== Reservoir ==
At full reservoir level of 114 m the reservoir of the dam has a surface area of 5.5 km^{2} and a total capacity of 111.9 mio. m^{3}. The active capacity is 69 (95.6 or 102) mio. m^{3}. Minimum operating level is 97 m. With the 95.6 mio. m^{3} 9.8 GWh can be produced.

== Power plant ==
The hydroelectric power plant was commissioned in 1951 (1950). It is operated by EDP. The plant has a nameplate capacity of 41 (14,7 or 40) MW. Its average annual generation is 63.8 (41, 61.8, or 53) GWh.

The power station contains 3 Francis turbine-generators in a surface powerhouse located at the toe of the dam. The first 2 units were commissioned in 1951, the third in 1993. The minimum hydraulic head is 28 m, the maximum 57 m.

Unit	Commission date	Turbine (MW)	Generator (MVA)	Rotation	Flow (m^{3}/s)
1	1951	8	9.68	375	18
2	1951	8	9.68	375	18
3	1993	25	28.5	272.7	52

== See also ==
- List of power stations in Portugal
- List of dams and reservoirs in Portugal
