= Belver Dam =

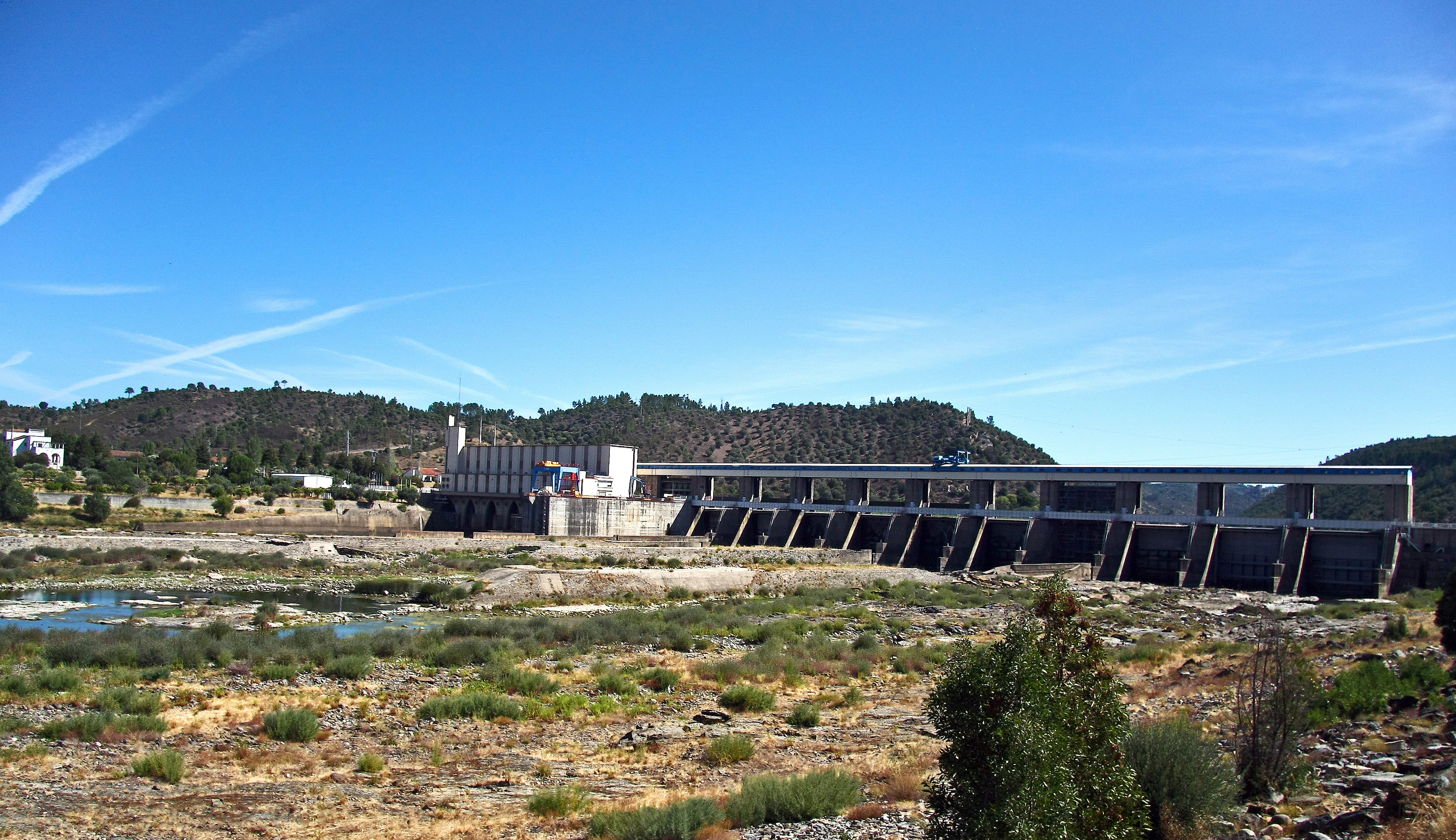

- Location within Portugal
- Official name: Barragem de Belver
- Location: municipality Gavião, Portalegre District, Portugal
- Coordinates: 39°28′47.2″N 7°59′52.3″W
- Purpose: Power
- Status: Operational
- Construction began: 1945
- Opening date: 1952
- Owner: HIDROTEJO
- Operator: Energias de Portugal

Dam and spillways
- Type of dam: Concrete gravity dam
- Impounds: Tagus
- Height (foundation): 30 m (98 ft)
- Length: 327.5 m (1,074 ft)
- Elevation at crest: 47.5 m (156 ft)
- Dam volume: 90,000 m^{3} (3,200,000 cu ft)
- Spillway type: Dam body
- Spillway capacity: 18,000 m^{3} (640,000 cu ft)

Reservoir
- Total capacity: 12,500,000 m^{3} (10,100 acre⋅ft)
- Active capacity: 8,500,000 m^{3} (6,900 acre⋅ft)
- Surface area: 2.86 km^{2} (1.10 mi^{2})
- Normal elevation: 46.15 m (151.4 ft)

Power Station
- Operator: Energias de Portugal
- Commission date: 1951
- Hydraulic head: 15.2 m (50 ft) (max)
- Turbines: Kaplan-type: 4 x 8.091 MW, 1 x 15.997 MW, 1 x 35.304 MW
- Installed capacity: 80.7 MW
- Annual generation: 220 GWh

Belver Dam (Portuguese: Barragem de Belver) is a concrete gravity dam on the Tagus, where the river forms the border line between the Portuguese districts of Portalegre and Santarém. It is located in the municipality Gavião, in Portalegre District.

Construction of the dam began in 1945. The dam was completed in 1952. It is owned by HIDROTEJO.

== Dam ==
Belver Dam is a 30-metre-tall (98 ft) (height above foundation) and 327.5-metre-long (1,074 ft) gravity dam with a crest altitude of 47.5 metres (156 ft). The volume of the dam is 90,000 m^{3}. The spillway is part of the dam body (10 roller gates with a maximum discharge capacity of 18,000 m^{3}/s).

== Reservoir ==
At full reservoir level of 46.15 metres (151.4 ft) (maximum flood level of 47.15 metres (154.7 ft)) the reservoir of the dam has a surface area of 2.86 km^{2} and its total capacity is 12.5 mio. m^{3}. The active capacity is 8.5 (7.5) mio. m^{3}. Minimum operating level is 41 metres (135 ft).

== Power plant ==
The run-of-the-river hydroelectric power plant went operational in 1951. It is operated by EDP. The plant has a nameplate capacity of 80.7 (80) MW. Its average annual generation is 220 (176, 180 or 239) GWh.

The power station contains six Kaplan turbine-generators in a dam powerhouse. The machines 1 to 5 have vertical shafts, whereas machine 6 has a horizontal shaft. The maximum hydraulic head is 15.2 metres (50 ft).

Machine	Commission date	Turbine (MW)	Generator (MVA)	Rotation
1	1951	8.091	11	167
2	1951	8.091	11	167
3	1951	8.091	11	167
4	1951	8.091	11	167
5	1971	15.997	20	125
6	1984	35.304	31	100

== See also ==
- List of power stations in Portugal
- List of dams and reservoirs in Portugal
