= Salamonde Dam =

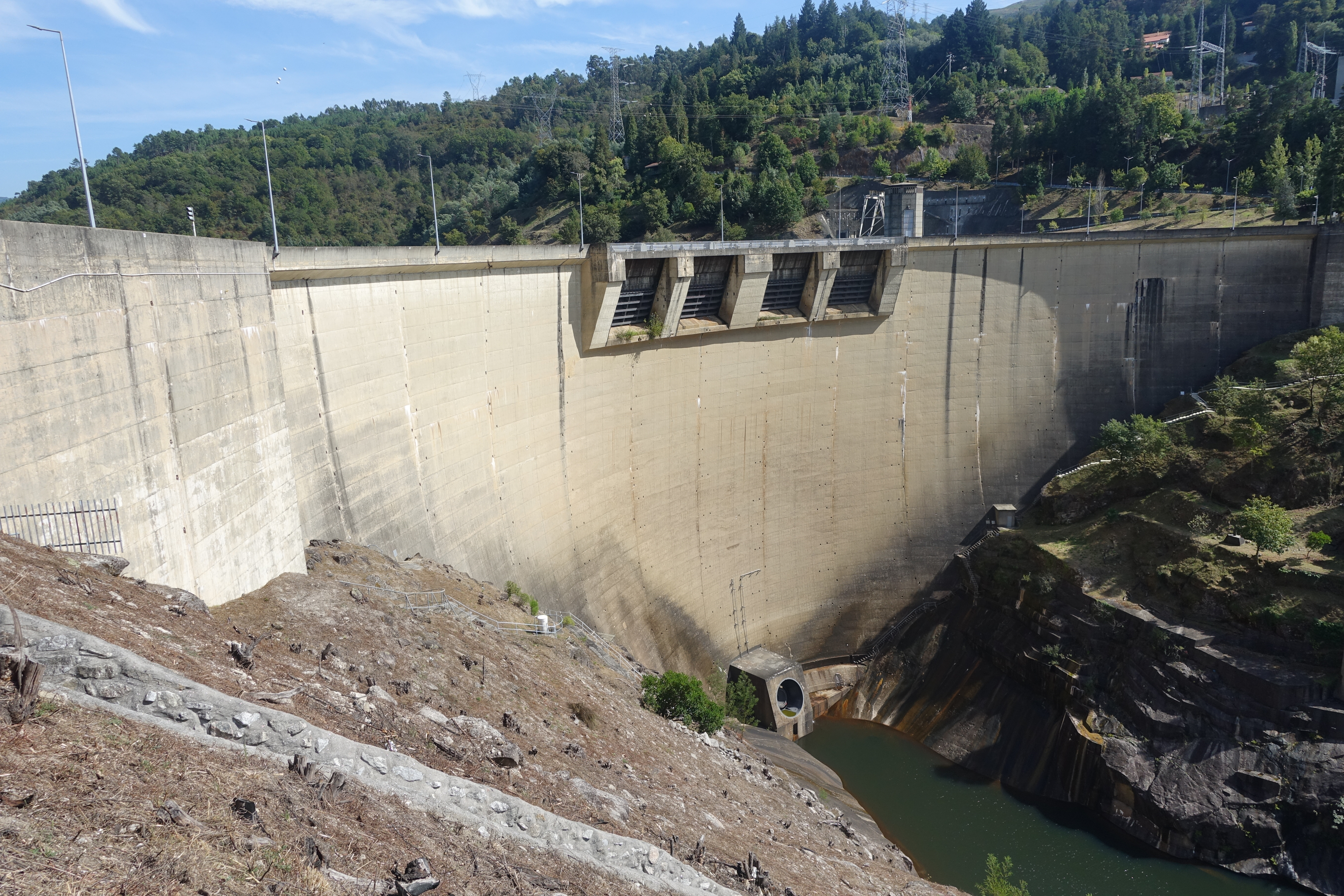

- Location within Portugal
- Official name: Barragem de Salamonde
- Location: municipality Vieira do Minho, Braga District, Portugal
- Coordinates: 41°41′30.6″N 8°5′28.5″W
- Purpose: Power
- Status: Operational
- Opening date: 1953
- Owner: Companhia Portuguesa de Produção de Electricidade

Dam and spillways
- Type of dam: Concrete arch dam
- Impounds: Cávado River
- Height (foundation): 75 m (246 ft)
- Length: 284 m (932 ft)
- Elevation at crest: 281 m (922 ft)
- Dam volume: 93,000 m^{3} (3,300,000 cu ft)
- Spillway type: Over the dam
- Spillway capacity: 1,700 m^{3}/s (1.4 acre⋅ft/s)

Reservoir
- Total capacity: 65,000,000 m^{3} (53,000 acre⋅ft)
- Active capacity: 56,300,000 m^{3} (45,600 acre⋅ft)
- Surface area: 2.42 km^{2} (0.93 mi^{2})
- Normal elevation: 280 m (920 ft)

Power Station
- Operator: Energias de Portugal
- Commission date: Salamonde I: 1953; Salamonde II: 2015
- Hydraulic head: Salamonde I: 125 m (410 ft) (max); Salamonde II: ?
- Turbines: Salamonde I: 2 x 21.8 MW Francis-type; Salamonde II: 1 x 207 MW Francis-type
- Installed capacity: Salamonde I: 42 MW; Salamonde II: 207 MW
- Annual generation: Salamonde I: 231.2 GWh; Salamonde II: 386 GWh

Salamonde Dam (Portuguese: Barragem de Salamonde; Portuguese pronunciation: [bɐˈʁaʒɐ̃j dɨ sɐlɐˈmõdɨ]) is a concrete arch dam on the Cávado River, where the river forms the border line between the districts of Braga and Vila Real. It is located in the municipality Vieira do Minho, in Braga District, Portugal.

The dam was completed in 1953. It is owned by Companhia Portuguesa de Produção de Electricidade (CPPE). The dam was designed by Coyne et Bellier.

== Dam ==
Salamonde Dam is a 75 m tall (height above foundation) and 284 m long arch dam with a crest altitude of 281 m. The volume of the dam is 93,000 m³. The dam features a spillway with 4 gates over the dam (maximum discharge 1,700 m³/s) and one bottom outlet (maximum discharge 130 m³/s).

== Reservoir ==
At full reservoir level of 280 m (maximum flood level of 280.5 m) the reservoir of the dam has a surface area of 2.42 (2.36) km² and a total capacity of 65 mio. m³; its active capacity is 56.3 (55 or 57) mio. m³. With the 55 mio. m³ water 26.9 GWh can be produced.

== Power plant ==
=== Salamonde I ===
The hydroelectric power plant went operational in 1953. It is operated by EDP. The plant has a nameplate capacity of 42 MW. Its average annual generation is 231.2 (175, 232 or 244) GWh.

The power station contains 2 Francis turbine-generators with 21.8 MW (25 MVA) each in an underground powerhouse. The turbine rotation is 428 rpm. The minimum hydraulic head is 78 m, the maximum 125 m. Maximum flow per turbine is 22 m³/s. The turbines and generators were provided by Voith.

=== Salamonde 2 ===
In 2011 Alstom has been awarded a contract by EDP to install a 207 MW Francis reversible pump turbine and a 244 MVA motor-generator in a new pumped-storage power plant. The new power plant is expected to go operational in August 2015. Its average annual generation is estimated to be 386 GWh.

== See also ==
- List of power stations in Portugal
- List of dams and reservoirs in Portugal
