= Fratel Dam =

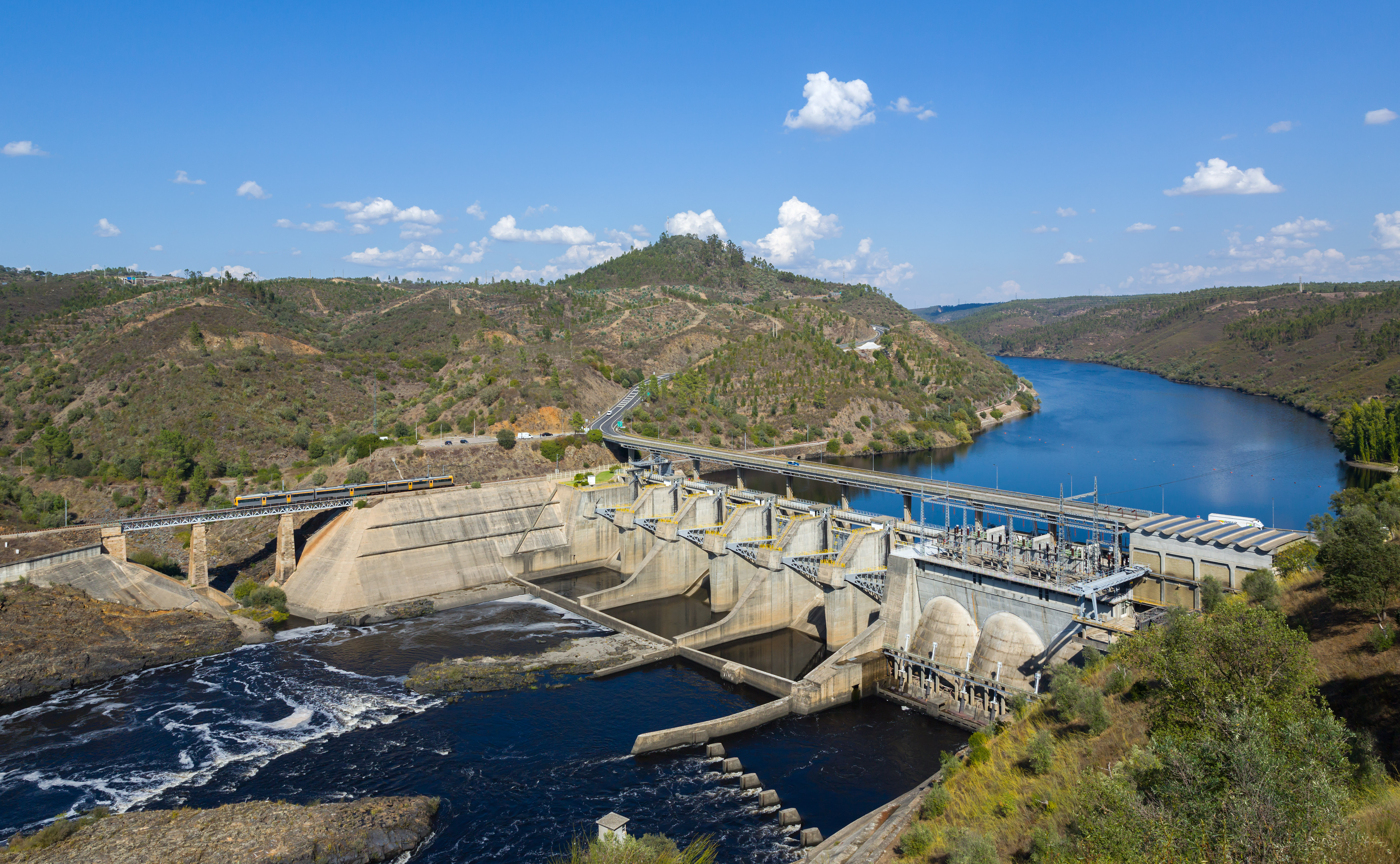

- Location within Portugal
- Official name: Barragem de Fratel
- Location: municipality Fratel, Vila Velha de Ródão, Portugal
- Coordinates: 39°32′34.1″N 7°48′10.4″W
- Purpose: Power
- Status: Operational
- Opening date: 1973
- Owner: Companhia Portuguesa de Produção de Electricidade
- Operator: Energias de Portugal

Dam and spillways
- Type of dam: Concrete gravity dam
- Impounds: Tagus
- Height (foundation): 48 m (157 ft)
- Height (thalweg): 43 m (141 ft)
- Length: 240 m (790 ft)
- Elevation at crest: 87 m (285 ft)
- Dam volume: 124,000 m^{3} (4,400,000 cu ft)
- Spillway type: Dam body
- Spillway capacity: 16,500 m^{3} (580,000 cu ft)

Reservoir
- Total capacity: 92,500,000 m^{3} (75,000 acre⋅ft)
- Active capacity: 21,000,000 m^{3} (17,000 acre⋅ft)
- Surface area: 10 km^{2} (3.9 mi^{2})
- Normal elevation: 74 m (243 ft)

Power Station
- Operator: Energias de Portugal
- Commission date: 1974
- Hydraulic head: 28.8 m (94 ft) (max)
- Turbines: 3 x 45.6 MW Kaplan-type
- Installed capacity: 132 MW
- Annual generation: 357.9 GWh

Fratel Dam (Portuguese: Barragem de Fratel) is a concrete gravity dam on the Tagus, where the river forms the border line between the districts of Castelo Branco and Portalegre. It is located in the municipality Vila Velha de Ródão, in Castelo Branco District, Portugal.

The dam was completed in 1973. It is owned by Companhia Portuguesa de Produção de Electricidade (CPPE). The construction of the dam meant the flooding of most of the tens of thousands of petroglyphs found in the Tagus valley rock art area.

== Dam ==
Fratel Dam is a 48 m tall (height above foundation) and 240 m long gravity dam with a crest altitude of 87 m. The volume of the dam is 124,000 m³. The spillway is part of the dam body (6 radial gates with a maximum discharge capacity of 16,500 m³/s).

== Reservoir ==
At full reservoir level of 74 m (maximum flood level of 76 m) the reservoir of the dam has a surface area of 10 (7,3) km² and its total capacity is 92.5 mio. m³. The active capacity is 21 mio. m³. Minimum operating level is 71 m.

== Power plant ==
The run-of-the-river hydroelectric power plant went operational in 1974. It is owned by CPPE, but operated by EDP. The plant has a nameplate capacity of 132 (130) MW. Its average annual generation is 357,9 (327, 347.5 or 382) GWh.

The power station contains 3 Kaplan turbine-generators with 45.6 MW (50 MVA) each in a dam powerhouse. The turbine rotation is 150 rpm. The minimum hydraulic head is 17.8 m, the maximum 28.8 m. Maximum flow per turbine is 250 m³/s.

== See also ==
- List of power stations in Portugal
- List of dams and reservoirs in Portugal
