= Pocinho Dam =

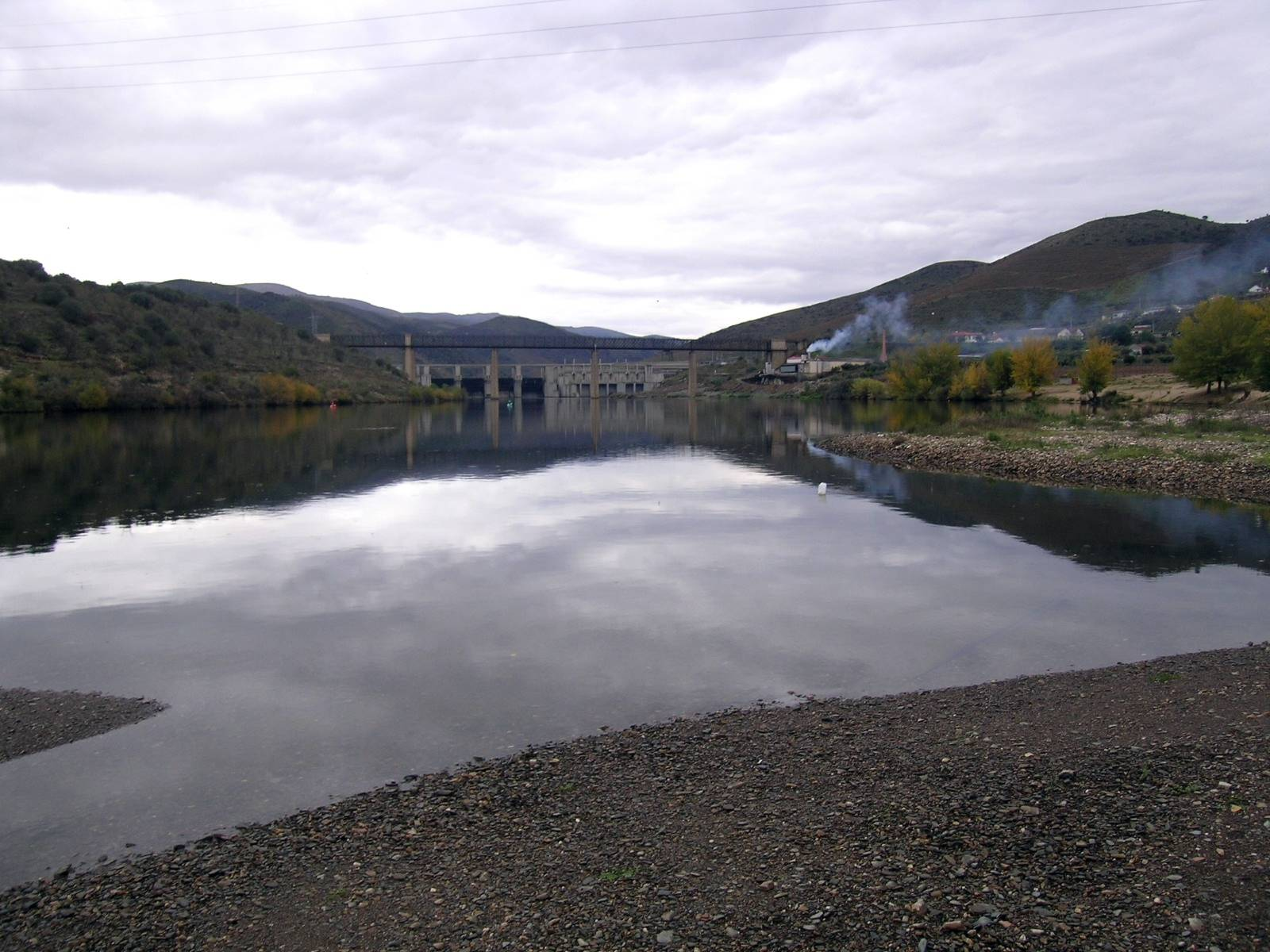

- Location within Portugal
- Official name: Barragem do Pocinho
- Country: Portugal
- Location: municipality Vila Nova de Foz Côa, Guarda District
- Coordinates: 41°8′3.5″N 7°6′50.8″W
- Purpose: Power
- Status: Operational
- Construction began: 1974
- Opening date: 1982
- Owner: Companhia Portuguesa de Produção de Electricidade
- Operator: Energias de Portugal

Dam and spillways
- Type of dam: Concrete gravity dam
- Impounds: Douro
- Height (foundation): 49 m (161 ft)
- Length: 430 m (1,410 ft)
- Elevation at crest: 139 m (456 ft)
- Width (crest): 6.4 m (21 ft)
- Dam volume: 120,000 m^{3} (4,200,000 cu ft)
- Spillway type: Dam body
- Spillway capacity: 15,000 m^{3}/s (530,000 cu ft/s)

Reservoir
- Total capacity: 83,070,000 m^{3} (67,350 acre⋅ft)
- Active capacity: 12,240,000 m^{3} (9,920 acre⋅ft)
- Surface area: 8.29 km^{2} (3.20 mi^{2})
- Normal elevation: 125.5 m (412 ft)

Power Station
- Operator: Energias de Portugal
- Commission date: 1983
- Hydraulic head: 21.6 m (71 ft) (max)
- Turbines: 3 x 57.6 MW Kaplan-type
- Installed capacity: 186 MW
- Annual generation: 408.4 GWh

Pocinho Dam (Portuguese: Barragem do Pocinho) is a concrete gravity dam on the Douro, where the river forms the border line between the districts of Guarda and Bragança. It is located in the municipality Vila Nova de Foz Côa, in Guarda District, Portugal.

Construction of the dam began in 1974. The dam was completed in 1982. It is owned by Companhia Portuguesa de Produção de Electricidade (CPPE).

== Dam ==
Pocinho Dam is a 49 m tall (height above foundation) and 430 m long gravity dam with a crest altitude of 139 m. The volume of the dam is 120,000 m^{3}. The spillway with 4 radial gates is part of the dam body (maximum discharge 15,000 m^{3}/s).

== Reservoir ==
At full reservoir level of 125.5 m (maximum flood level of 134.5 m) the reservoir of the dam has a surface area of 8.29 km^{2} and a total capacity of 83.07 mio. m^{3}. The active capacity is 12.24 (12) mio. m^{3}.

== Power plant ==
The run-of-the-river hydroelectric power plant was commissioned in 1983 (1982). It is operated by EDP. The plant has a nameplate capacity of 186 MW. Its average annual generation is 408.4 (406.2, 530 or 534) GWh.

The power station contains 3 Kaplan turbine-generators with 57.6 MW (62 MVA) each in a dam powerhouse located on the left side of the dam. The turbine rotation is 88.2 rpm. The minimum hydraulic head is 15.5 m, the maximum 21.6 m. Maximum flow per turbine is 390 m^{3}/s.

The turbines were provided by Kværner, the generators by ABB Group.

== Lock ==
On the right side of the dam is a lock, which can handle ships with the following maximum properties: 83 m in length, 11.40 m on the beam, 3.8 m load-draught and a cargo capacity of 2500 tons.

== See also ==
- List of power stations in Portugal
- List of dams and reservoirs in Portugal
