= Régua Dam =

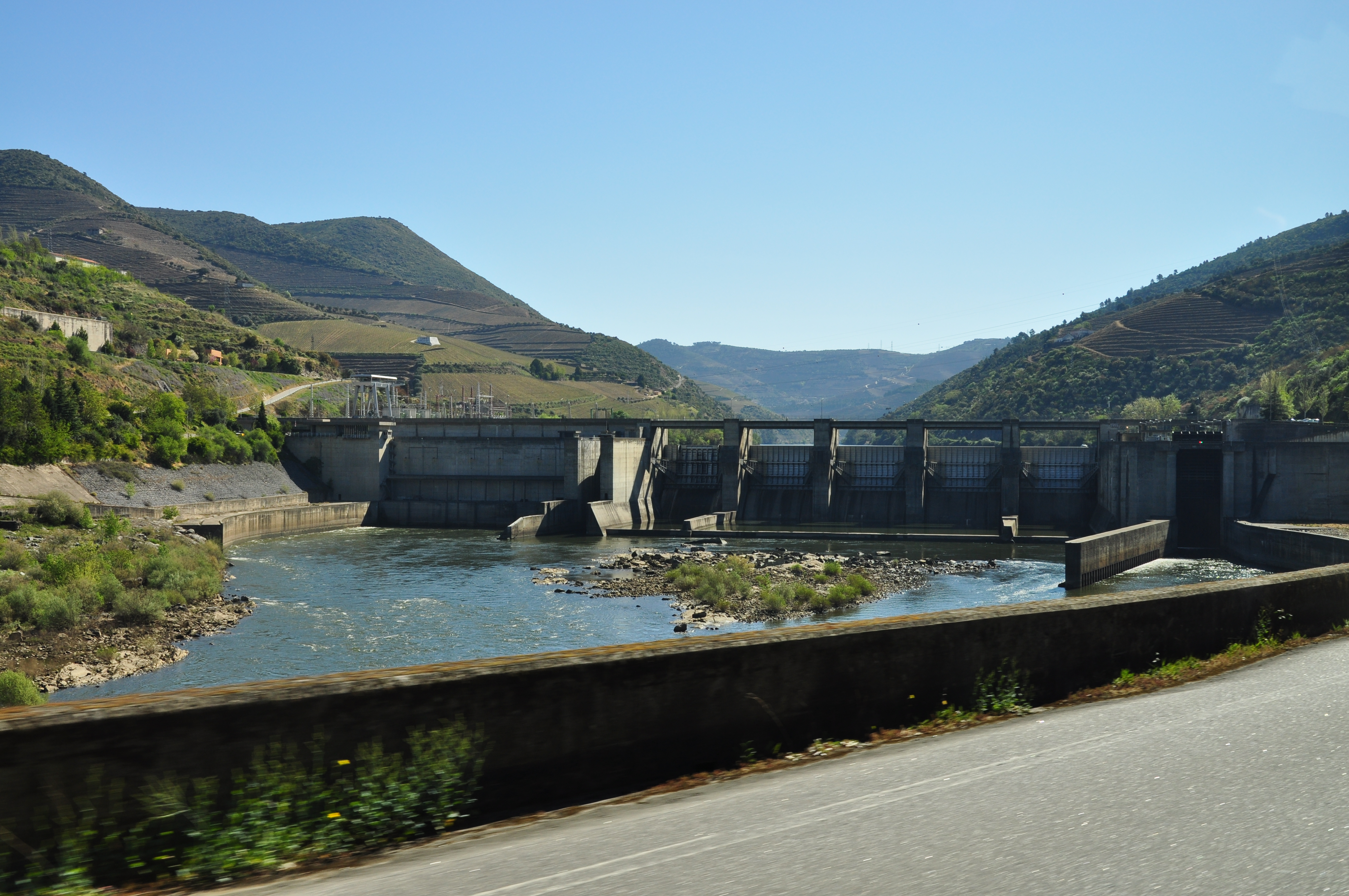

- Location within Portugal
- Official name: Barragem da Régua
- Country: Portugal
- Location: municipality Peso da Régua, Vila Real District
- Coordinates: 41°8′46″N 7°44′24″W
- Purpose: Power
- Status: Operational
- Construction began: 1965
- Opening date: 1973
- Owner: Companhia Portuguesa de Produção de Electricidade
- Operator: Energias de Portugal

Dam and spillways
- Type of dam: Concrete gravity dam
- Impounds: Douro
- Height (foundation): 41 m (135 ft)
- Length: 350 m (1,150 ft)
- Elevation at crest: 81 m (266 ft)
- Width (crest): 6 m (20 ft)
- Dam volume: 108,000 m^{3} (3,800,000 cu ft)
- Spillway type: Dam body
- Spillway capacity: 21,500 m^{3}/s (760,000 cu ft/s)

Reservoir
- Total capacity: 97,000,000 m^{3} (79,000 acre⋅ft)
- Active capacity: 8,000,000 m^{3} (6,500 acre⋅ft)
- Surface area: 8.5 km^{2} (3.3 mi^{2})
- Normal elevation: 73.5 m (241 ft)

Power Station
- Operator: Energias de Portugal
- Commission date: 1973
- Hydraulic head: 27.5 m (90 ft) (max)
- Turbines: 3 x 58.84 MW Kaplan-type
- Installed capacity: 180 MW
- Annual generation: 581.1 GWh

Régua Dam (Portuguese: Barragem da Régua) is a concrete gravity dam on the Douro, where the river forms the border line between the districts of Vila Real and Viseu. It is located in the municipality Peso da Régua, in Vila Real District, Portugal.

Construction of the dam began in 1965. The dam was completed in 1973. It is owned by Companhia Portuguesa de Produção de Electricidade (CPPE).

== Dam ==
Régua Dam is a 41 m tall (height above foundation) and 350 m long gravity dam with a crest altitude of 81 m. The volume of the dam is 108,000 m³. The spillway with 5 radial gates is part of the dam body (maximum discharge 21,500 m³/s). There is also a bottom outlet.

== Reservoir ==
At full reservoir level of 73.5 m the reservoir of the dam has a surface area of 8.5 km^{2} and a total capacity of 95 mio. m³. The active capacity is 12 (13) mio. m³.

== Power plant ==
The run-of-the-river hydroelectric power plant was commissioned in 1973. It is operated by EDP. The plant has a nameplate capacity of 180 (156) MW. Its average annual generation is 581.1 (620.8, 682 or 738) GWh.

The power station contains 3 Kaplan turbine-generators with 58.84 (52 or 60) MW (58 MVA) each in a dam powerhouse located on the right side of the dam. The turbine rotation is 107.1 rpm. The minimum hydraulic head is 20 m, the maximum 27.5 m. Maximum flow per turbine is 316 m³/s.

The turbines were provided by Kværner, the generators by Brown, Boveri & Cie.

== Lock ==
On the left side of the dam is a lock, which can handle ships with the following maximum properties: 83 m in length, 11.40 m on the beam, 3.8 m load-draught and a cargo capacity of 2500 tons.

== See also ==
- List of power stations in Portugal
- List of dams and reservoirs in Portugal
