= Crestuma–Lever Dam =

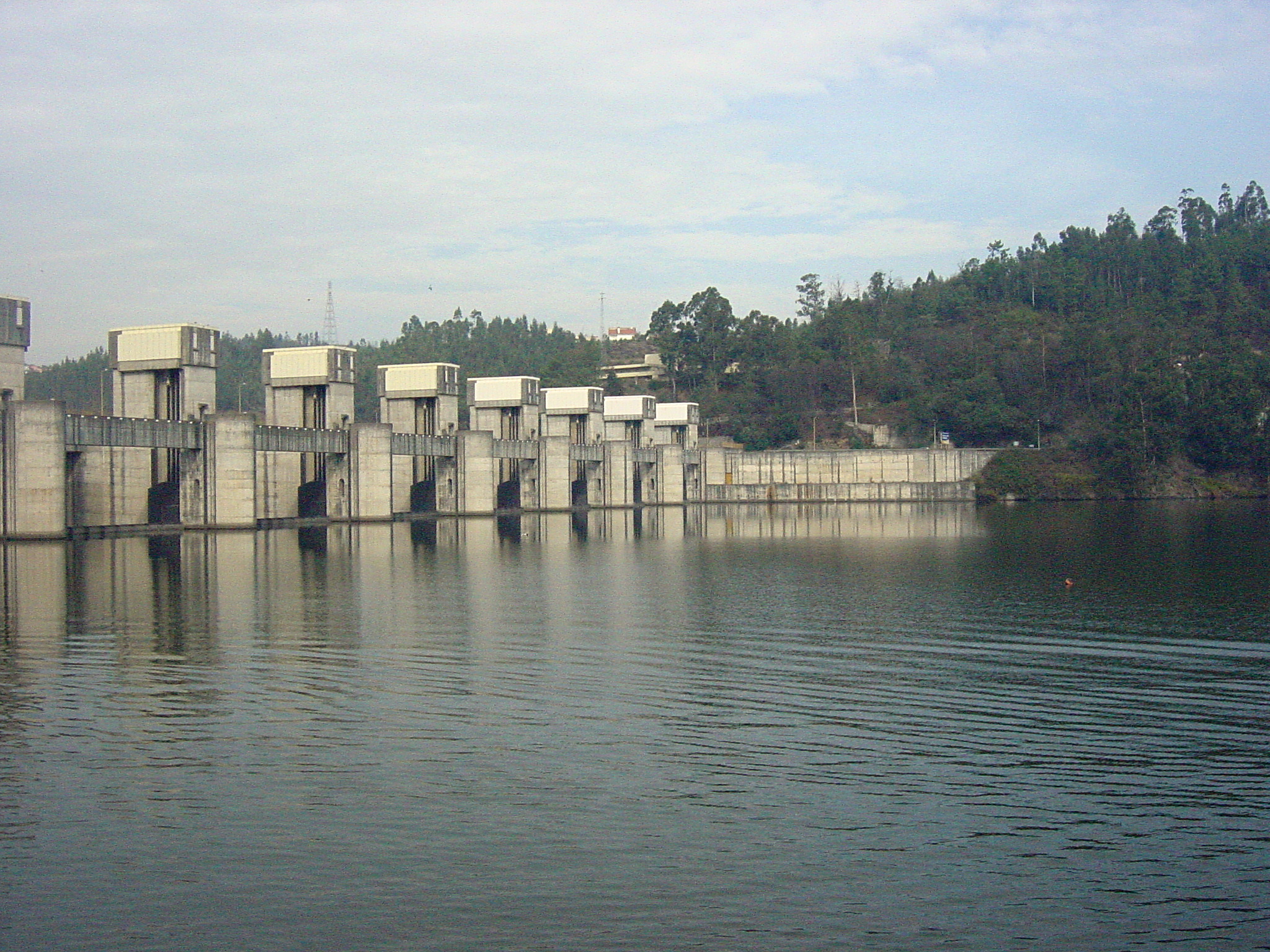
- Upstream face of the dam and retained lake

- Location within Portugal
- Official name: Barragem de Crestuma-Lever
- Country: Portugal
- Location: municipality Vila Nova de Gaia, Porto District
- Coordinates: 41°4′21.9″N 8°29′10.8″W
- Purpose: Power
- Status: Operational
- Construction began: 1976
- Opening date: 1985
- Owner: Companhia Portuguesa de Produção de Electricidade
- Operator: Energias de Portugal

Dam and spillways
- Type of dam: Concrete gravity dam
- Impounds: Douro
- Height (foundation): 25.5 m (84 ft)
- Length: 470 m (1,540 ft)
- Elevation at crest: 25.5 m (84 ft)
- Width (crest): 8.2 m (27 ft)
- Dam volume: 205,000 m^{3} (7,200,000 cu ft)
- Spillway type: Dam body
- Spillway capacity: 26,000 m^{3}/s (920,000 cu ft/s)

Reservoir
- Total capacity: 110,000,000 m^{3} (89,000 acre⋅ft)
- Active capacity: 22,500,000 m^{3} (18,200 acre⋅ft)
- Surface area: 12.98 km^{2} (5.01 mi^{2})
- Normal elevation: 13 m (43 ft)

Power Station
- Operator: Energias de Portugal
- Commission date: 1985
- Hydraulic head: 12.6 m (41 ft) (max)
- Turbines: 3 x 39 MW Kaplan-type
- Installed capacity: 117 MW
- Annual generation: 360 GWh

Crestuma–Lever Dam (Portuguese: Barragem de Crestuma-Lever) is a concrete gravity dam on the Douro. It is located in the municipality Vila Nova de Gaia, in Porto District, Portugal.

Construction of the dam began in 1976. The dam was completed in 1985. It is owned by Companhia Portuguesa de Produção de Electricidade (CPPE).

== Dam ==
Crestuma–Lever Dam is a 25.5 m tall (height above foundation) and 470 m long gravity dam with a crest altitude of 25.5 m. The volume of the dam is 205,000 m³. The spillway with 8 gates is part of the dam body (maximum discharge 26,000 m³/s).

== Reservoir ==
At full reservoir level of 13 m (maximum flood level of 21.5 m) the reservoir of the dam has a surface area of 12.98 km^{2} and a total capacity of 110 mio. m³. The active capacity is 22.5 (16 or 19) mio. m³.

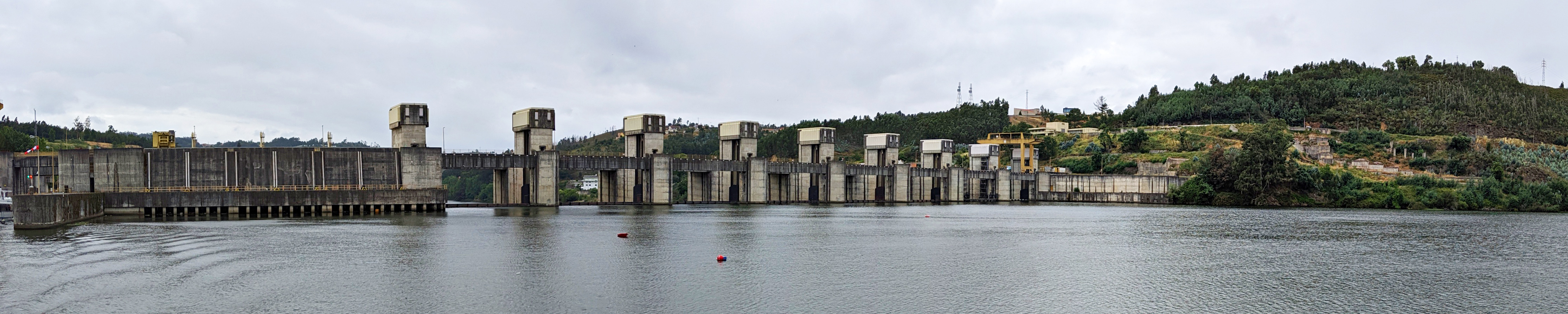
Panoramic view of the dam from a boat on its lake

== Power plant ==
The run-of-the-river hydroelectric power plant was commissioned in 1985 (1986). It is operated by EDP. The plant has a nameplate capacity of 117 (105 or 108) MW. Its average annual generation is 360 (311, 363, 366.9, or 399) GWh.

The power station contains 3 Kaplan turbine-generators (horizontal axis) with 39 (36) MW (36.1 MVA) each in a dam powerhouse located on the left side of the dam. The turbine rotation is 83.3 rpm. The minimum hydraulic head is 6.8 m, the maximum 12.6 m. Maximum flow per turbine is 450 m³/s.

The turbines and generators were provided by Sorefame.

== Lock ==
On the left side of the dam is a lock, which can handle ships with the following maximum properties: 83 m in length, 11.40 m on the beam, 3.8 m load-draught and a cargo capacity of 2500 tons.

== See also ==
- List of power stations in Portugal
- List of dams and reservoirs in Portugal
