= Arada–Montemuro Wind Farm =

Wind farm in Portugal

This article is rated Start-Class. You can help Wikipedia by expanding it.

The 112 megawatt (MW) Arada–Montemuro Wind Farm is an onshore Wind Farm in the Viseu district of Portugal. It uses 65 Enercon E-82 wind turbines. It has 133 MW of capacity across all of its parks.

In December 2025, Portugal's total installed wind power capacity reached 6.55 GW (6,550 MW).

It is owned and operated by EDF renewables but was developed by Eolica da Arada.
