= Valeira Dam =

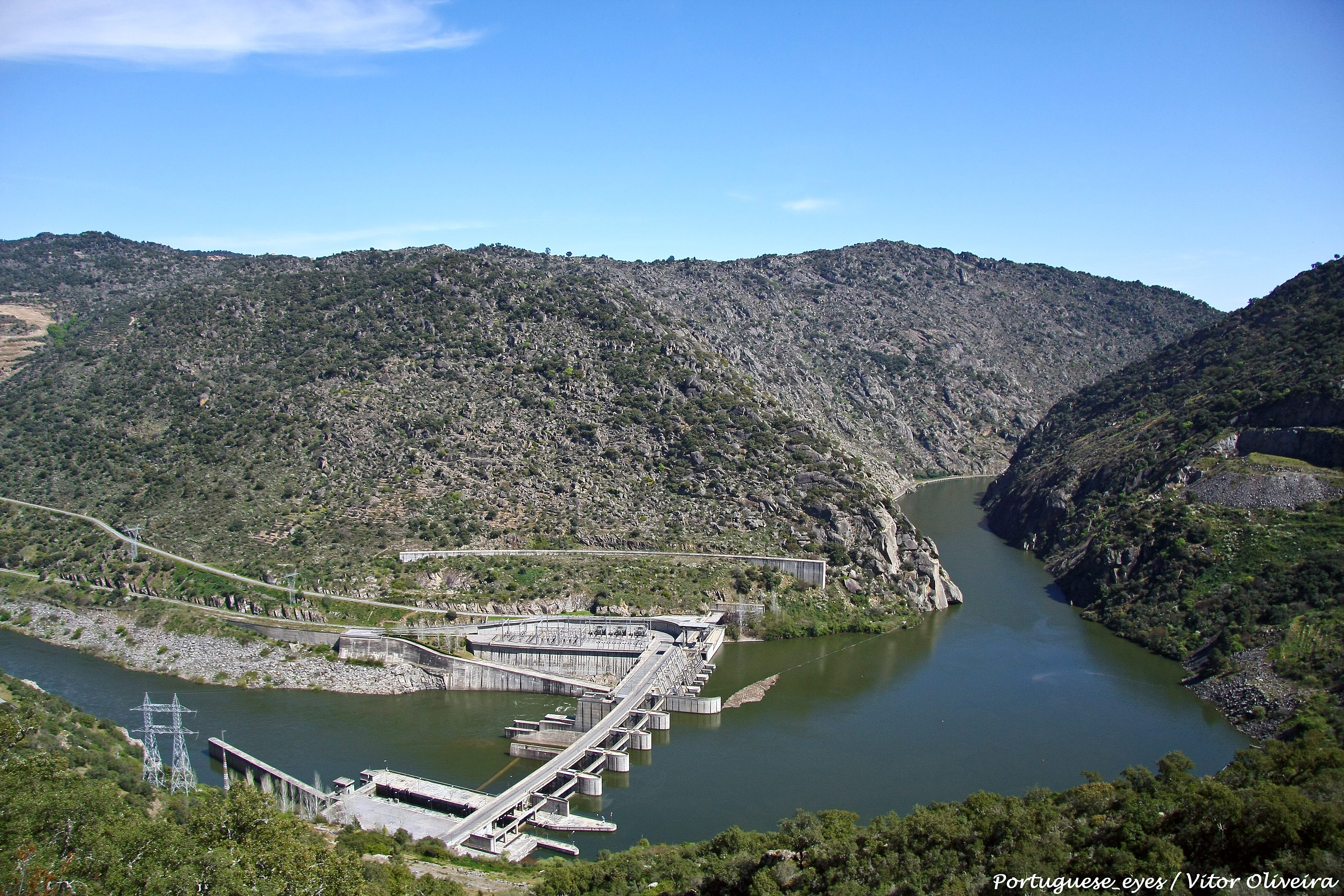
- Valeira Dam downstream of the curve that follows the exceptionally tight gorge of the Douro River, known as Cachão da Valeira

- Location within Portugal
- Official name: Barragem da Valeira
- Country: Portugal
- Location: municipality São João da Pesqueira, Viseu District
- Coordinates: 41°09′38″N 7°22′30″W
- Purpose: Power
- Status: Operational
- Construction began: 1971
- Opening date: 1975
- Owner: Companhia Portuguesa de Produção de Electricidade
- Operator: Energias de Portugal

Dam and spillways
- Type of dam: Concrete gravity dam
- Impounds: Douro
- Height (foundation): 48 m (157 ft)
- Length: 380 m (1,250 ft)
- Elevation at crest: 113 m (371 ft)
- Width (crest): 6 m (20 ft)
- Dam volume: 220,000 m^{3} (7,800,000 cu ft)
- Spillway type: Dam body
- Spillway capacity: 18,000 m^{3}/s (640,000 cu ft/s)

Reservoir
- Total capacity: 97,000,000 m^{3} (79,000 acre⋅ft)
- Active capacity: 8,000,000 m^{3} (6,500 acre⋅ft)
- Surface area: 7.95 km^{2} (3.07 mi^{2})
- Normal elevation: 105 m (344 ft)

Power Station
- Operator: Energias de Portugal
- Commission date: 1976
- Hydraulic head: 31.5 m (103 ft) (max)
- Turbines: 3 x 82.4 MW Kaplan-type
- Installed capacity: 240 MW
- Annual generation: 610.7 GWh

Valeira Dam (Portuguese: Barragem da Valeira) is a concrete gravity dam on the Douro, where the river forms the border line between the districts of Viseu and Bragança. It is located in the municipality São João da Pesqueira, in Viseu District, Portugal.

Construction of the dam began in 1971. The dam was completed in 1975. It is owned by Companhia Portuguesa de Produção de Electricidade (CPPE).

== Dam ==
Valeira Dam is a 48 m tall (height above foundation) and 380 m long gravity dam with a crest altitude of 113 m. The volume of the dam is 220,000 m^{3}. The spillway with 5 radial gates is part of the dam body (maximum discharge 18,000 m^{3}/s).

== Reservoir ==
At full reservoir level of 105 m the reservoir of the dam has a surface area of 7.95 km^{2} and a total capacity of 97 mio. m³. The active capacity is 8 (12, 13 or 13,04) mio. m³.

== Power plant ==
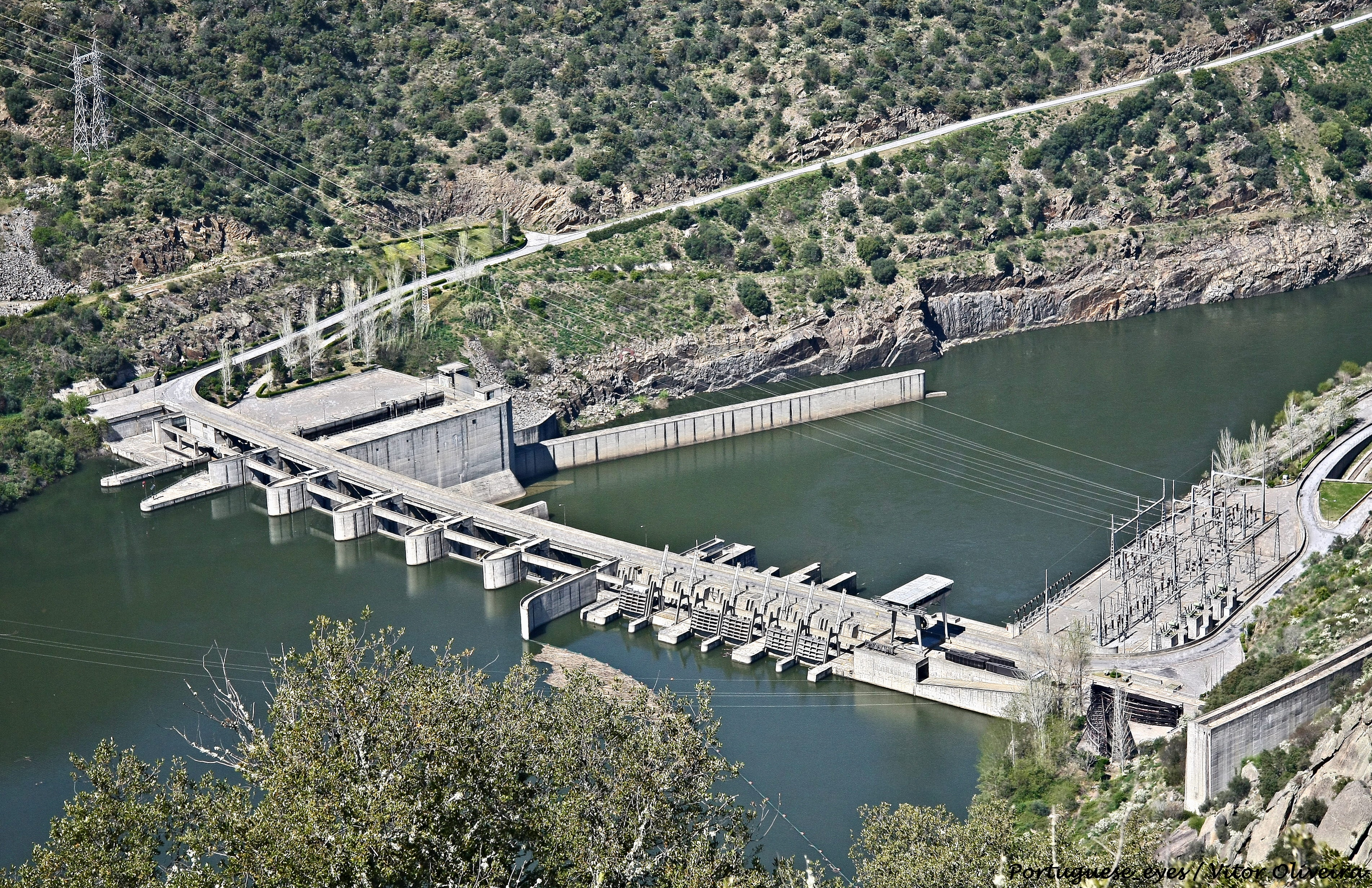
Valeira Dam

The run-of-the-river hydroelectric power plant was commissioned in 1976 (1975). It is operated by EDP. The plant has a nameplate capacity of 240 (216) MW. Its average annual generation is 610.7 (663, 748 or 801) GWh.

The power station contains 3 Kaplan turbine-generators with 82.4 (72) MW (80 MVA) each in a dam powerhouse located on the right side of the dam. The turbine rotation is 115.4 rpm. The minimum hydraulic head is 15.5 m, the maximum 31.5 m. Maximum flow per turbine is 360 m^{3}/s.

The turbines were provided by Kværner, the generators by Brown, Boveri & Cie.

== Lock ==
On the left side of the dam is a lock, which can handle ships with the following maximum properties: 83 m in length, 11.40 m on the beam, 3.8 m load-draught and a cargo capacity of 2500 tons.

== See also ==
- List of power stations in Portugal
- List of dams and reservoirs in Portugal
