= Carrapatelo Dam =

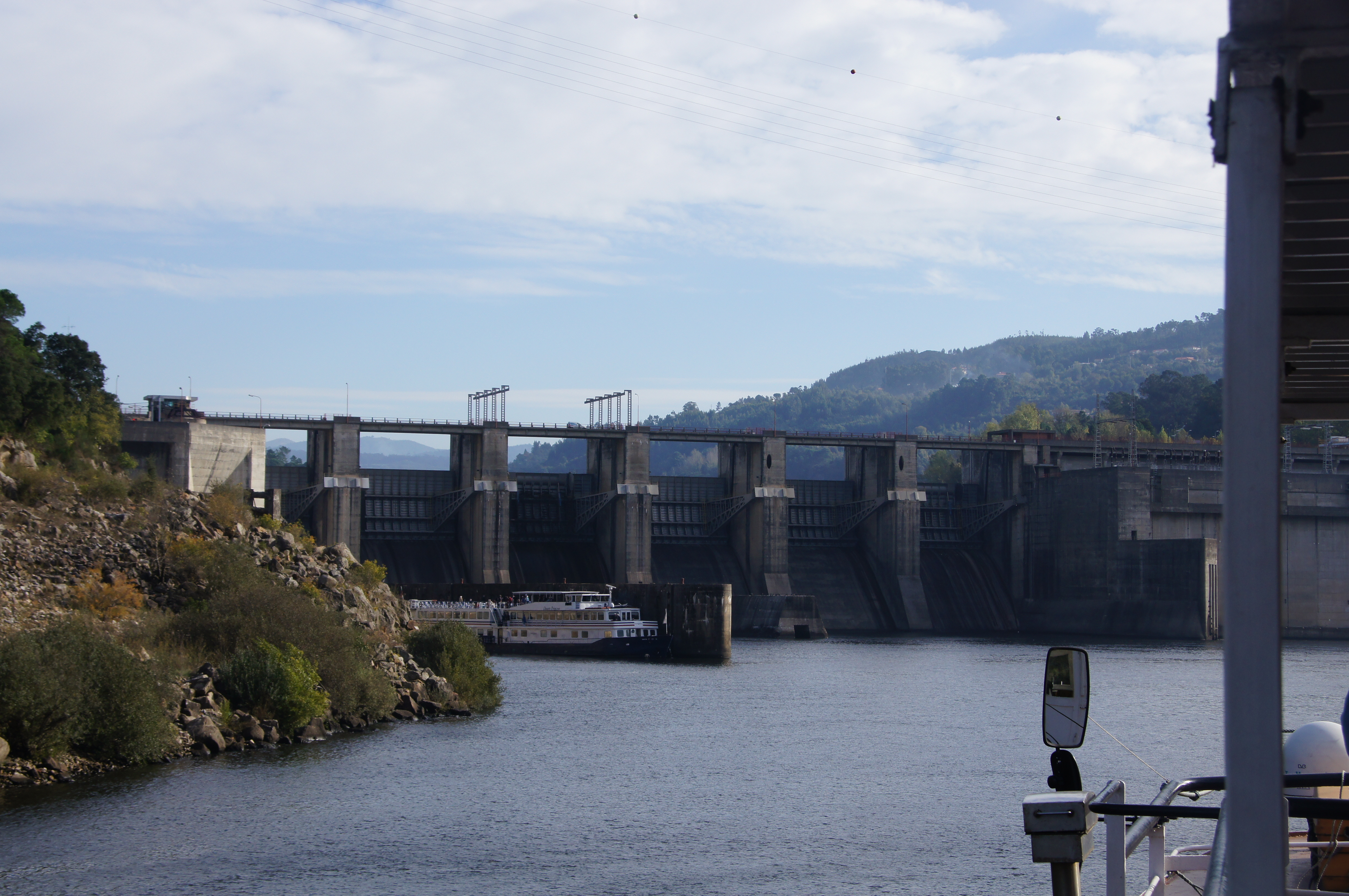

- Location within Portugal
- Official name: Barragem do Carrapatelo
- Country: Portugal
- Location: municipalities of Marco de Canaveses, Porto District and Cinfães, Viseu District
- Coordinates: 41°5′5.6″N 8°7′50.2″W
- Status: Operational
- Construction began: 1964
- Opening date: 1972
- Owner: Companhia Portuguesa de Produção de Electricidade
- Operator: Energias de Portugal

Dam and spillways
- Type of dam: Concrete gravity dam
- Impounds: Douro
- Height (foundation): 57 m (187 ft)
- Length: 400 m (1,300 ft)
- Elevation at crest: 55 m (180 ft)
- Dam volume: 190,000 m^{3} (6,700,000 cu ft)
- Spillway type: Dam body
- Spillway capacity: 22,000 m^{3} (780,000 cu ft)

Reservoir
- Total capacity: 148,400,000 m^{3} (120,300 acre⋅ft)
- Active capacity: 9,000,000 m^{3} (7,300 acre⋅ft)
- Surface area: 9.52 km^{2} (3.68 mi^{2})
- Normal elevation: 46.5 m (153 ft)

Power Station
- Operator: Energias de Portugal
- Commission date: 1971
- Hydraulic head: 37 m (121 ft) (max)
- Turbines: 3 x 63.4 MW Kaplan-type
- Installed capacity: 201 MW
- Annual generation: 806.1 GWh

Carrapatelo Dam (Portuguese: Barragem do Carrapatelo) is a concrete gravity dam on the Douro, where the river forms the borderline between the districts of Porto and Viseu. It is located in the municipalities of Marco de Canaveses, in Porto District, and Cinfães, Viseu District, Portugal.

Construction of the dam began in 1964. The dam was completed in 1972. It is owned by Companhia Portuguesa de Produção de Electricidade (CPPE).

== Dam ==
Carrapatelo Dam is a 57 m tall (height above foundation) and 400 m long gravity dam with a crest altitude of 55 m. The volume of the dam is 190,000 m³. The spillway is part of the dam body (maximum discharge 22,000 m³/s). There is also a bottom outlet.

== Reservoir ==
At full reservoir level of 46.5 m the reservoir of the dam has a surface area of 9.52 km² and its total capacity is 148.4 mio. m³. The active capacity is 9 (15,6 or 16) mio. m³.

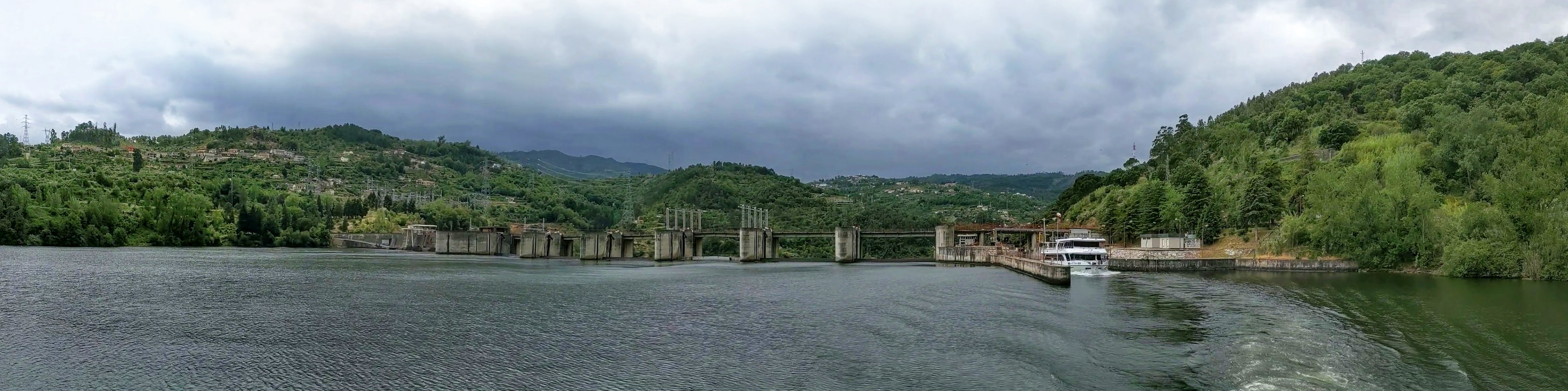
Panoramic view of the dam from a boat on the lake

== Power plant ==
The run-of-the-river hydroelectric power plant went operational in 1971. It is owned by CPPE, but operated by EDP. The plant has a nameplate capacity of 201 (180) MW. Its average annual generation is 806.1 (783, 870.6 or 882) GWh.

The power station contains 3 Kaplan turbine-generators with 63.4 MW each in a dam powerhouse. The turbine rotation is 115.4 rpm. The minimum hydraulic head is 20 m, the maximum 37 m. Maximum flow per turbine is 290 m³/s.

The first 2 machines went operational in 1971, the third in 1972. The turbines were provided by Kværner, the generators by Brown, Boveri & Cie.

== Lock ==
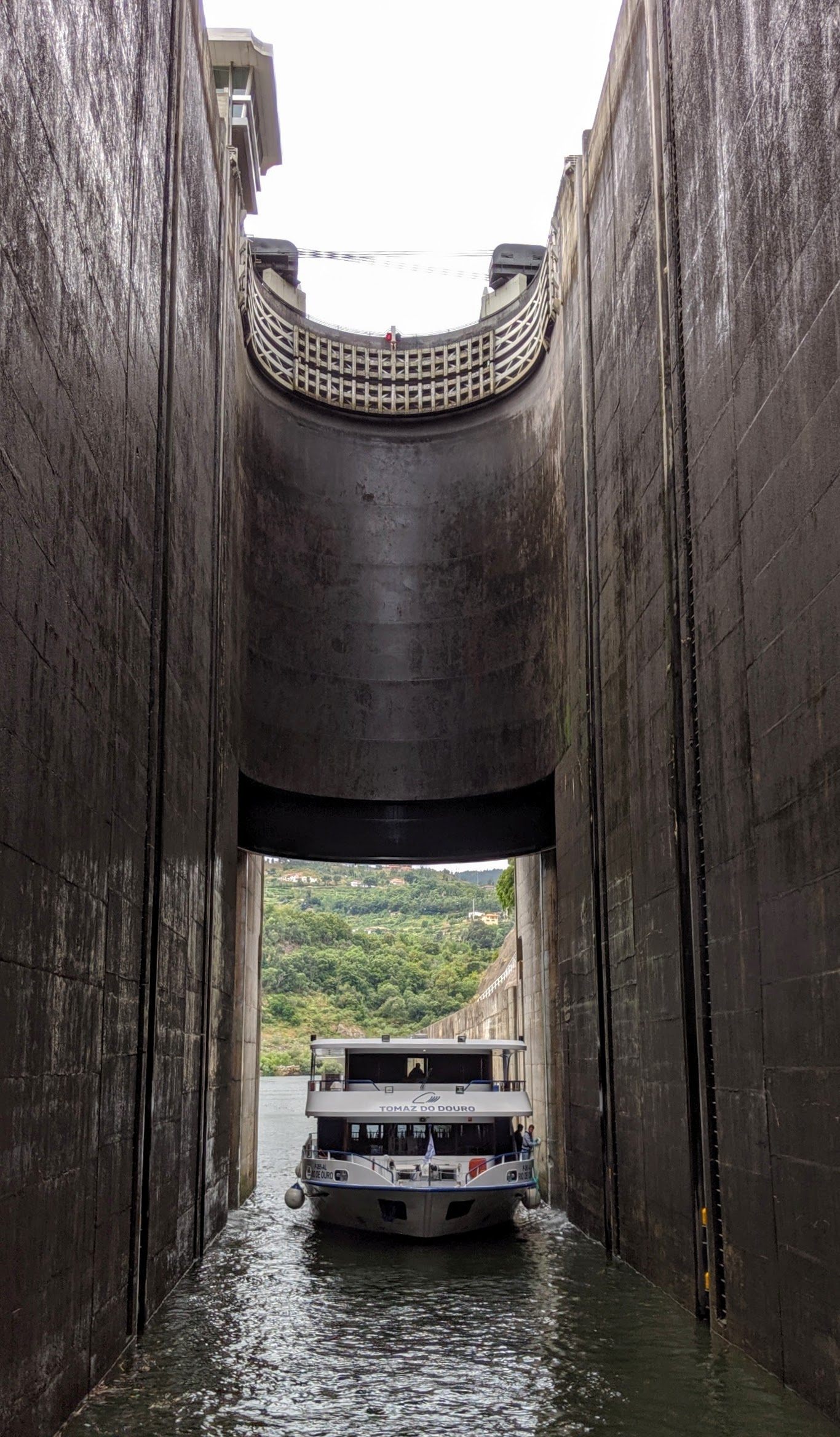
Inside the 35 m lock

On the right side of the dam is a lock, which can handle ships with the following maximum properties: 83 m in length, 11.40 m on the beam, 3.8 m load-draught and a cargo capacity of 2500 tons. The water level change through the lock is about 35 m.

== See also ==
- List of power stations in Portugal
- List of dams and reservoirs in Portugal
