= Aguieira Dam =

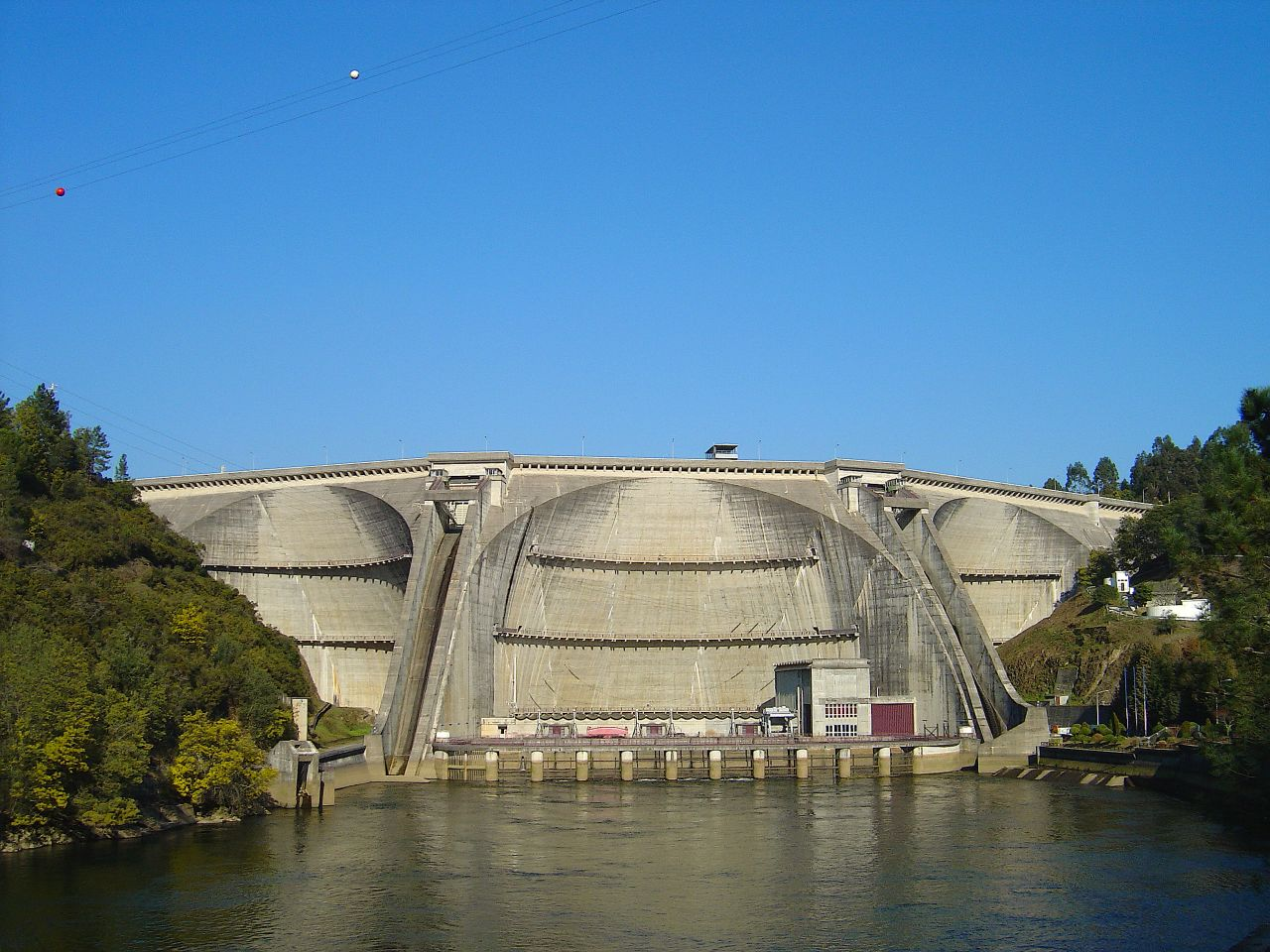

- Location within Portugal
- Official name: Barragem da Aguieira
- Location: Mortágua/Penacova, Central Portugal, Portugal
- Coordinates: 40°20′24.7″N 8°11′49.2″W
- Status: Operational
- Construction began: 1972
- Opening date: 1981
- Owner: Companhia Portuguesa de Produção de Electricidade

Dam and spillways
- Type of dam: Concrete multiple arch dam
- Impounds: Mondego River
- Height (foundation): 89 m (292 ft)
- Length: 400 m (1,300 ft)
- Elevation at crest: 125 m (410 ft)
- Dam volume: 365,000 m^{3} (12,900,000 cu ft)
- Spillway type: On the dam body
- Spillway capacity: 2,080 m³

Reservoir
- Total capacity: 423,000,000 m^{3} (343,000 acre⋅ft)
- Active capacity: 304,000,000 m^{3} (246,000 acre⋅ft)
- Surface area: 20 km^{2} (7.7 mi^{2})
- Normal elevation: 117 m (384 ft)

Power Station
- Operator: Energias de Portugal
- Commission date: 1981
- Type: Pumped-storage
- Hydraulic head: 71.6 m (235 ft) (max)
- Turbines: 3 x 90 MW Francis-type
- Installed capacity: 336 MW
- Annual generation: 209.9 GWh

Aguieira Dam (Portuguese: Barragem da Aguieira) is a multiple-arch dam on the Mondego River, located on border line between the municipalities of Mortágua and Penacova, in Central Portugal.

Construction of the dam began in 1972 and was completed in 1981. It is owned by Companhia Portuguesa de Produção de Electricidade (CPPE). Besides power production the dam is also used for flood control, water supply and irrigation.

== Dam ==
Aguieira Dam is an 89 m tall (height above foundation) and 400 m long multiple arch dam with a crest altitude of 125 m. The volume of the dam is 365,000 m³. The dam contains 2 crest spillways (maximum discharge 2,080 m³/s) and one bottom outlet (maximum discharge 180 m³/s).

== Reservoir ==
At full reservoir level of 117 m (maximum flood level of 126 m) the reservoir of the dam has a surface area of 20 km² and its total capacity is 423 mio. m³. Its active capacity is 304 (216 or 253) mio. m³. Minimum operating level is 100 m. With the 216 mio. m³ water 39.2 GWh can be produced. The reservoir submerged the villages of Breda (in the municipality of Mortágua) and Foz do Dão (in the municipality of Santa Comba Dão).

== Power plant ==
The power plant went operational in 1981. It is a pumped-storage hydroelectric power station. It is owned by CPPE, but operated by EDP and Iberdrola. The plant has a nameplate capacity of 336 (270) MW. Its average annual generation is 209.9 (193, 209.6 or 256) GWh.

The power station contains 3 Francis turbine-generators with 112.4 MW each in a surface powerhouse at the toe of the dam. The turbine rotation is 125 rpm. The minimum hydraulic head is 53.4 m, the maximum 71.6 m. Maximum flow per turbine is 180 m³/s. When pumping, the turbine has a maximum energy consumption of 91 MW and can pump 156 m³/s.

As lower reservoir for Aguieira the reservoir of Raiva Dam is used.

== See also ==
- List of power stations in Portugal
- List of dams and reservoirs in Portugal
