= List of power stations in Portugal =

The following page lists some power stations in Portugal.

== Hydroelectric ==
Station	District	Coordinates	River	Type	Capacity (MW)	Year commissioned
Aguieira Dam	Coimbra	40.340°N 8.197°W	Mondego	Pumped-storage	336 MW	1981
Alto Lindoso Dam	Viana do Castelo	41.872°N 8.204°W	Limia	Pumped-storage	630 MW	1992
Alto Rabagão Dam	Montalegre	41.739°N 7.857°W	Rabagão River	Pumped-storage	68? MW	1964
Alto Tâmega Dam	Vila Real District	41.574639°N 7.731111°W	Tâmega River		160 MW	
Alqueva Dam	Évora/Beja	38.195°N 7.497°W	Guadiana	Pumped-storage	259.2 MW (Stage 1); 259.2 MW (Stage 2)	2004 (Stage 1); 2013 (Stage 2)
Bemposta Dam	Bragança	41.300°N 6.470°W	Douro	Run-of-the-river	240 MW (Stage 1); 191 MW (Stage 2)	1964 (Stage 1); 2011 (Stage 2)
Cabril Dam	Castelo Branco/Leiria	39.917°N 8.132°W	Zêzere	Conventional	108 MW	1954
Carrapatelo Dam	Porto/Viseu	41.084°N 8.130°W	Douro	Run-of-the-river	201 MW	1971
Castelo de Bode Dam	Santarém	39.543°N 8.319°W	Zêzere	Conventional	159 MW	1951
Crestuma–Lever Dam	Porto	41.070°N 8.485°W	Douro	Run-of-the-river	117 MW	1985
Daivões Dam	Vila Real District	41.524353°N 7.864898°W	Tâmega River		118 MW	
Gouvães Dam	Vila Real District	41.494174°N 7.727307°W	Torno River		880 MW	
Miranda Dam	Bragança	41.488°N 6.265°W	Douro	Run-of-the-river	180 MW (Stage 1); 189 MW (Stage 2)	1960 (Stage 1); 1995 (Stage 2)
Picote Dam	Bragança	41.378°N 6.351°W	Douro	Run-of-the-river	195 MW (Stage 1); 246 MW (Stage 2)	1958 (Stage 1); 2011 (Stage 2)
Pocinho Dam	Guarda	41.134°N 7.114°W	Douro	Run-of-the-river	186 MW	1982
Régua Dam	Vila Real	41.147°N 7.739°W	Douro	Run-of-the-river	180 MW	1973
Salamonde Dam	Braga	41.690°N 8.091°W	Cávado	Conventional	42 MW (Stage 1); 207 MW (Stage 2)	1953 (Stage 1); 2015 (Stage 2)
Santa Luzia Dam	Coimbra	40.089°N 7.857°W	Unhais	Conventional	32 MW	1942
Valeira Dam	Viseu	41.160°N 7.377°W	Douro	Run-of-the-river	240 MW	1976
Vilarinho das Furnas Dam	Braga	41.762°N 8.208°W	Homem	Conventional	125 MW	1972

== Thermal ==
Station	District	Coordinates	Capacity (MW)	Primary fuel	Year commissioned	Status
Carregado Power Station	Lisbon	39.013°N 8.956°W	710 MW	Fuel oil	1969	Decommissioned (2012)
Lares Power Station	Coimbra	40.124°N 8.775°W	826 MW	Natural gas	2009	Operational
Pego I Power Station	Santarém	39.468°N 8.109°W	576 MW	Coal	1993	Decommissioned (2021)
Pego II Power Station	Santarém	39.468°N 8.109°W	837 MW	Natural gas	2010	Operational
Ribatejo Power Station	Lisbon	39.011°N 8.951°W	1176 MW	Natural gas	2005	Operational
Setúbal Power Station	Setúbal	38.509°N 8.844°W	946 MW	Fuel oil / natural gas	1979	Decommissioned (2013)
Sines Power Station	Setúbal	37.932°N 8.803°W	1180 MW	Coal	1985	Decommissioned (2020)
Tapada do Outeiro I Power Station	Porto	41.067°N 8.459°W	150 MW	Coal	1959	Decommissioned (2004)
Tapado do Outeiro II Power Station	Porto	41.069°N 8.459°W	990 MW	Natural gas	1999	Operational
Tunes Power Station	Faro	37.165°N 8.263°W	165 MW	Diesel	1973	Decommissioned (2014)

== Wind ==
In December 2025, Portugal's total installed wind power capacity reached 6.55 GW (6,550 MW).

Station	District	Coordinates	Capacity (MW)	Year commissioned	Notes
Alto Minho			240 MW	2008	
Arada–Montemuro			133 MW	2007	
			MW		

== Solar ==
In 2024, Portugal had 5.81 GW of solar capacity.

Station	District	Coordinates	Capacity (MW)	Year commissioned	Notes
Santas	Portalegre	38.93°N 7.45°W	181 MW	2024	
Moura	Beja	38°11′20″N 7°12′08″W	62 MW	2010	
Serpa	Serpa	38°01′51″N 7°37′22″W	11 MW	2007	
			MW		

== Geothermal ==
Station	District	Coordinates	Capacity (MW)	Year commissioned
Pico Vermelho Power Station			12	
Ribeira Grande Power Station			16	

== Cogeneration ==
Station	District	Coordinates	Capacity (MW)	Primary fuel	Year commissioned	Status
Barreiro Cogeneration Station	Setúbal	38.675°N 9.054°W	64.5 MW	Fuel oil	1979	Decommissioned (2010) Demolished (2020)

== See also ==
- List of power stations in Europe
- List of largest power stations in the world
