= Bemposta Dam =

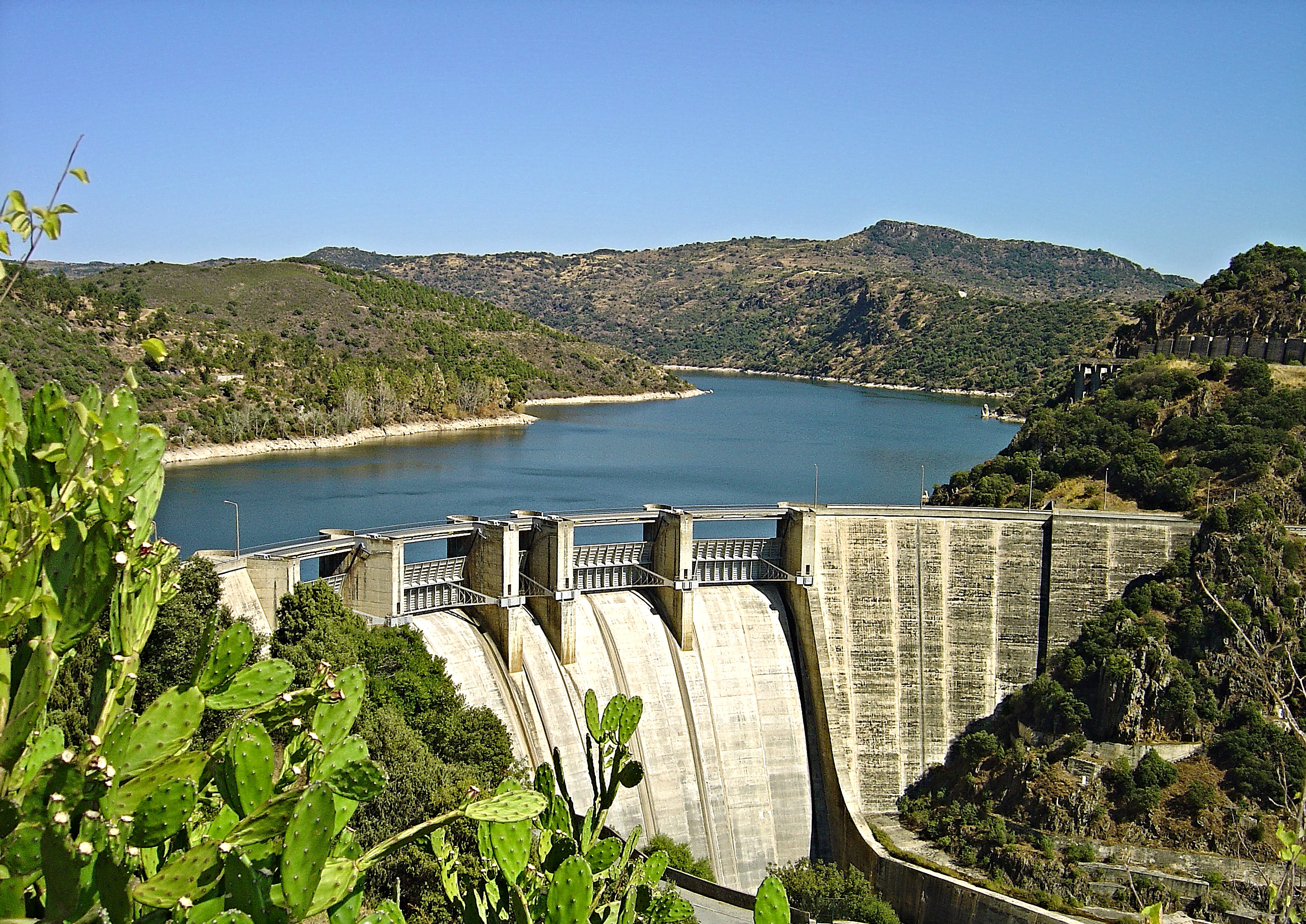

- Location within Portugal
- Official name: Barragem de Bemposta
- Location: municipality Mogadouro, Bragança District, Portugal
- Coordinates: 41°18′3.2″N 6°28′11.6″W
- Status: Operational
- Construction began: 1957
- Opening date: 1964
- Owner: Companhia Portuguesa de Produção de Electricidade

Dam and spillways
- Type of dam: Concrete arch dam
- Impounds: Douro
- Height: 87 m (285 ft)
- Length: 297 m (974 ft)
- Width (crest): 3.5 m (11 ft)
- Dam volume: 316,000 m^{3} (11,200,000 cu ft)
- Spillway type: Over the dam
- Spillway capacity: 11,500 m³

Reservoir
- Total capacity: 129,000,000 m^{3} (105,000 acre⋅ft)
- Active capacity: 20,000,000 m^{3} (16,000 acre⋅ft)
- Surface area: 4.05 km^{2} (1.56 mi^{2})
- Maximum water depth: 402 m (1,319 ft)

Power Station
- Operator: Energias de Portugal
- Commission date: Bemposta I: 1964; Bemposta II: 2011
- Hydraulic head: Bemposta I: 71 m (233 ft) (max); Bemposta II: 65 m (213 ft) (static)
- Turbines: Bemposta I: 3 x 79.5 MW Francis-type; Bemposta II: 191 MW Francis-type
- Installed capacity: Bemposta I: 240 MW; Bemposta II: 191 MW
- Annual generation: Bemposta I: 924.1 GWh; Bemposta II: 134 GWh

Bemposta Dam (Portuguese: Barragem de Bemposta) is a concrete arch dam on the Douro, where the river forms the national border line between Spain and Portugal. It is located in the municipality Mogadouro, in Bragança District, Portugal.

Construction of the dam began in 1957. The dam was completed in 1964. It is owned by Companhia Portuguesa de Produção de Electricidade (CPPE).

== Dam ==
Bemposta Dam is an 87-metre-tall (285 ft) (height above foundation) and 297-metre-long (974 ft) arch dam with a crest altitude of 408 m. The volume of the dam is 316,000 m³. The dam contains four crest spillways (maximum discharge 11,500 m³/s) and one bottom outlet (maximum discharge 200 m³/s).

== Reservoir ==
At full reservoir level of 402 metres the reservoir of the dam (Portuguese: Albufeira da Barragem de Bemposta) has a surface area of 4.05 km^{2} and its total capacity is 129 mio. m³ (active capacity 20 mio. m³).

== Power plant ==
The power plant is a run-of-the-river hydroelectric power station. It is owned by CPPE, but operated by EDP.

=== Bemposta I ===
Bemposta I has a nameplate capacity of 240 (210)MW. Its average annual generation is 924.1 (918, 1,034 or 1,086) GWh.

The power station contains three Francis turbine-generators with 79.5 (70) MW each in an underground powerhouse. The turbine rotation is 150 rpm. The minimum hydraulic head is 59 m, the maximum 71 m. Maximum flow per turbine is 152 m³/s.

=== Bemposta II ===
In January 2008 construction began on the Bemposta II power plant. In December 2011 work on an additional underground powerhouse was completed and a further Francis turbine with a 191 MW capacity went online. Its average annual generation is 134 GWh.

== See also ==
- List of power stations in Portugal
