= Miranda Dam =

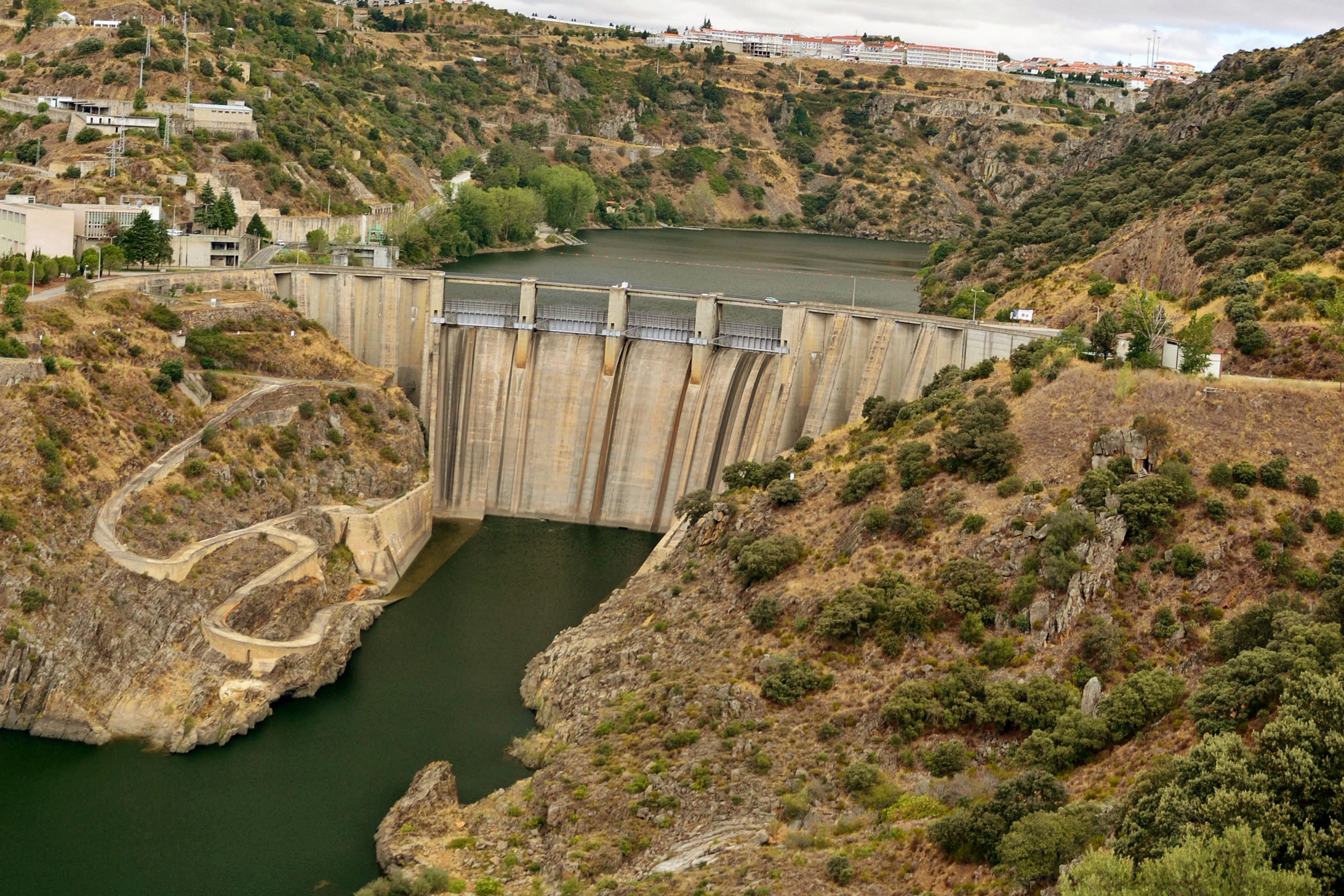

- Location within Portugal
- Official name: Barragem de Miranda
- Location: municipality Miranda do Douro, Bragança District, Portugal
- Coordinates: 41°29′19″N 6°15′56.2″W
- Status: Operational
- Construction began: 1955
- Opening date: 1961
- Owner: Companhia Portuguesa de Produção de Electricidade

Dam and spillways
- Type of dam: Concrete buttress dam
- Impounds: Douro
- Height: 80 m (260 ft)
- Length: 263 m (863 ft)
- Dam volume: 240,000 m^{3} (8,500,000 cu ft)
- Spillway type: Over the dam
- Spillway capacity: 11,000 m³

Reservoir
- Total capacity: 28,100,000 m^{3} (22,800 acre⋅ft)
- Active capacity: 6,660,000 m^{3} (5,400 acre⋅ft)
- Surface area: 1.22 km^{2} (0.47 mi^{2})

Power Station
- Operator: Energias de Portugal
- Commission date: Miranda I: 1960; Miranda II: 1995
- Hydraulic head: Miranda I: 66 m (217 ft) (max); Miranda II: 60 m (200 ft) (max)
- Turbines: Miranda I: 3 x 58.84 MW Francis-type; Miranda II: 193 MW Francis-type
- Installed capacity: Miranda I: 180 MW; Miranda II: 189 MW
- Annual generation: Miranda I + II: 897.8 GWh

Miranda Dam (Portuguese: Barragem de Miranda) is a concrete buttress dam on the Douro, where the river forms the national border line between Spain and Portugal. It is located in the municipality Miranda do Douro, in Bragança District, Portugal.

Construction of the dam began in 1955. The dam was completed in 1961. It is owned by Companhia Portuguesa de Produção de Electricidade (CPPE).

== Dam ==
Miranda Dam is an 80-m-tall (height above foundation) and 263-m-long buttress dam with a crest altitude of 535 m. The volume of the dam is 240,000 m³. The dam contains 4 crest spillways (maximum discharge 11,000 m³/s) and one bottom outlet.

== Reservoir ==
At full reservoir level of 528.05 m (maximum flood level of 533 m) the reservoir of the dam has a surface area of 1.22 km^{2} and its total capacity is 28.1 mio. m³ (active capacity 6.66 mio. m³).

== Power plant ==
The power plant went operational in 1960. It is a run-of-the-river hydroelectric power station. It is owned by CPPE, but operated by EDP. The plant has a nameplate capacity of 369 (390) MW. Its average annual generation is 897.8 (879 or 1,036.3) GWh.

=== Miranda I ===
The power station contains 3 Francis turbine-generators with 58.84 (67) MW each in an underground powerhouse. The turbine rotation is 150 rpm. The minimum hydraulic head is 51 m, the maximum 66 m. Maximum flow per turbine is 128 m³/s.

=== Miranda II ===
In 1995 an additional underground powerhouse was completed and a further Francis turbine with a 193 MW capacity went online. The turbine rotation is 100 rpm. The minimum hydraulic head is 40 m, the maximum 60 m. Maximum flow of the turbine is 386 m³/s.

== See also ==
- List of power stations in Portugal
