= Santa Luzia Dam =

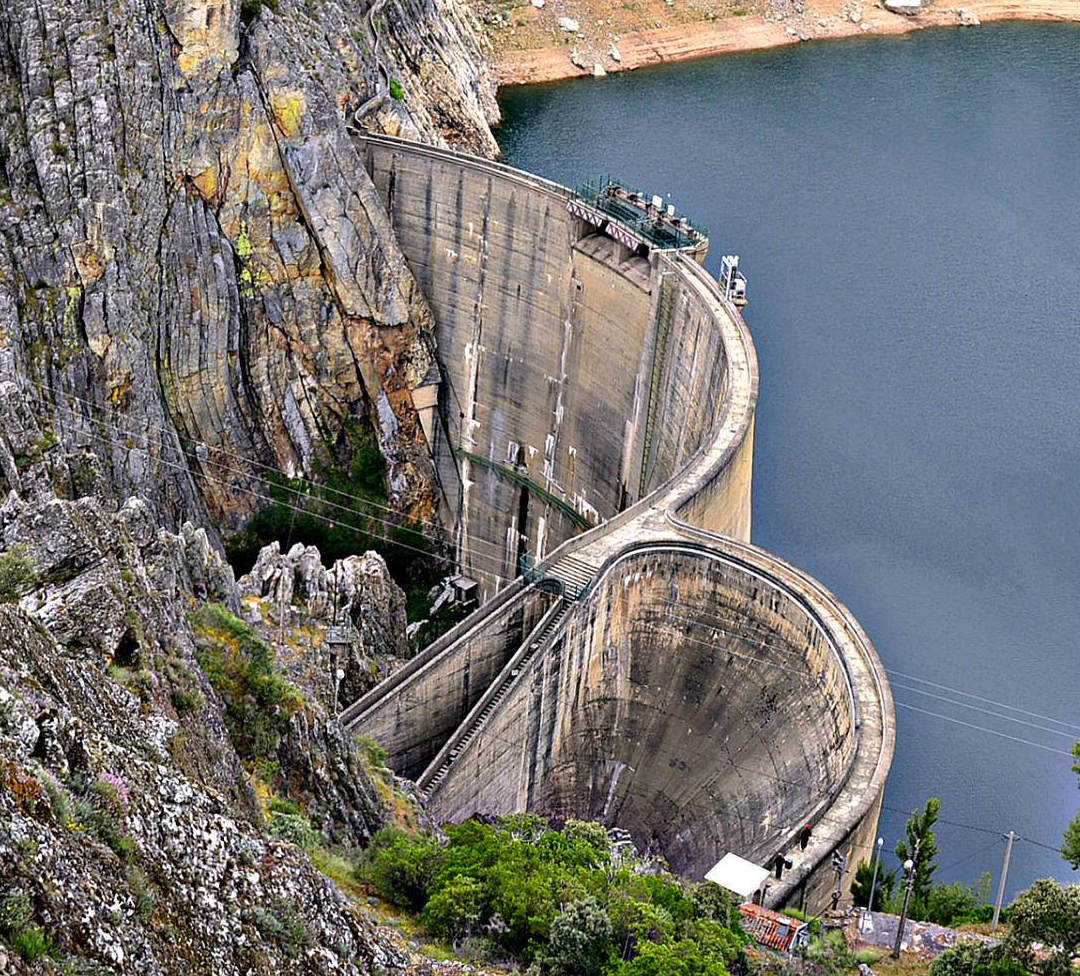
- Santa Luzia Dam

- Location within Portugal
- Official name: Barragem de Santa Luzia
- Location: municipality Pampilhosa da Serra, Coimbra District, Portugal
- Coordinates: 40°5′23.2″N 7°51′28.8″W
- Status: Operational
- Construction began: 1930
- Opening date: 1942

Dam and spillways
- Type of dam: Concrete arch dam
- Impounds: Unhais
- Height: 76 metres (249 ft)
- Length: 115 metres (377 ft)
- Width (crest): 2.5 metres (8 ft 2 in)
- Dam volume: 80,000 m^{3} (2,800,000 cu ft)

Reservoir
- Creates: Santa Luzia Reservoir
- Total capacity: 53,700,000 m^{3} (1.90×10^{9} cu ft)
- Surface area: 2.46 km^{2} (0.95 mi^{2})

Power Station
- Commission date: 1942
- Turbines: 4 x 8 MW Pelton-type
- Installed capacity: 32 MW
- Annual generation: 55 GWh

Santa Luzia Dam (Portuguese: Barragem de Santa Luzia) is a concrete arch dam on the Unhais, a northern tributary of the Zêzere River, located in the municipality Pampilhosa da Serra, in Coimbra District, Portugal. The dam was constructed between 1930 and 1942 and was designed by André Coyne.

== Design ==
Santa Luzia Dam is a 76 m tall and 115 m long arch dam. The volume of the dam is 80.000 m³. The dam contains 2 crest spillways and one bottom outlet. At full reservoir level the reservoir of the dam (Portuguese: Albufeira da Barragem de Santa Luzia) has a surface area of 2.46 km² and its total capacity is 53.7 Mio m³.

The concrete of the dam is affected by concrete swelling, caused by an alkali–silica reaction, that leads to tensions and cracks in the concrete.

== Power plant ==
The power plant is one of the smaller hydroelectric power stations in Portugal with a nameplate capacity of 32 MW. Its average annual generation is 55 Mio. kWh. The power station contains four Pelton turbine-generators.

== See also ==
- List of power stations in Portugal
