= Castelo do Bode Dam =

Castelo de Bode Dam
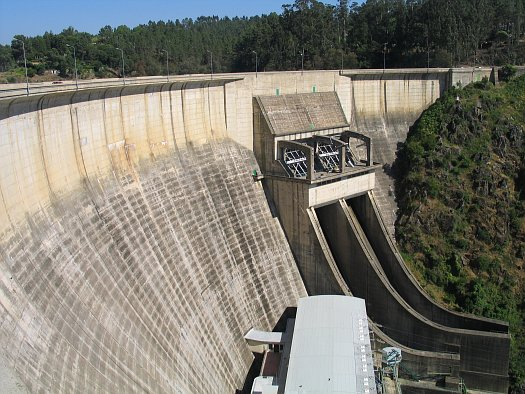
- Castelo de Bode Dam
- Official name: Barragem de Castelo do Bode
- Location: near Tomar and Constância, Santarém District, Portugal
- Coordinates: 39°32′34″N 8°19′11″W
- Status: Operational
- Construction began: 1945
- Opening date: 1951
- Owner(s): Energias de Portugal

Dam and spillways
- Type of dam: Concrete arch-gravity
- Impounds: Zêzere River
- Height: 115 metres (377 ft)
- Length: 402 metres (1,319 ft)
- Spillway type: Service, chute

Reservoir
- Creates: Castelo de Bode Reservoir
- Total capacity: 1,095,000,000 m^{3} (3.87×10^{10} cu ft)
- Active capacity: 900,500,000 m^{3} (3.180×10^{10} cu ft)
- Catchment area: 3,950 km^{2} (1,530 sq mi)

Power Station
- Operator(s): Energias de Portugal
- Commission date: 1951-1952
- Turbines: 3 x 46 MW Francis-type
- Installed capacity: 138 MW
- Annual generation: 396.5 GWh

Castelo do Bode Dam is a concrete arch-gravity dam on the Zêzere River, a tributary of the Tagus River, located southeast of Tomar and north of Constância, in Santarém District, Portugal. It is one of the tallest structures in Portugal. The dam was constructed between 1945 and 1951. It also supports a 138 MW hydroelectric power station which was commissioned between 1951 and 1952. This power station has black start capabilities, and after the 2025 Iberian Peninsula blackout was one of the two first power plants to start reenergizing the Iberian power grid.
