= Picote Dam =

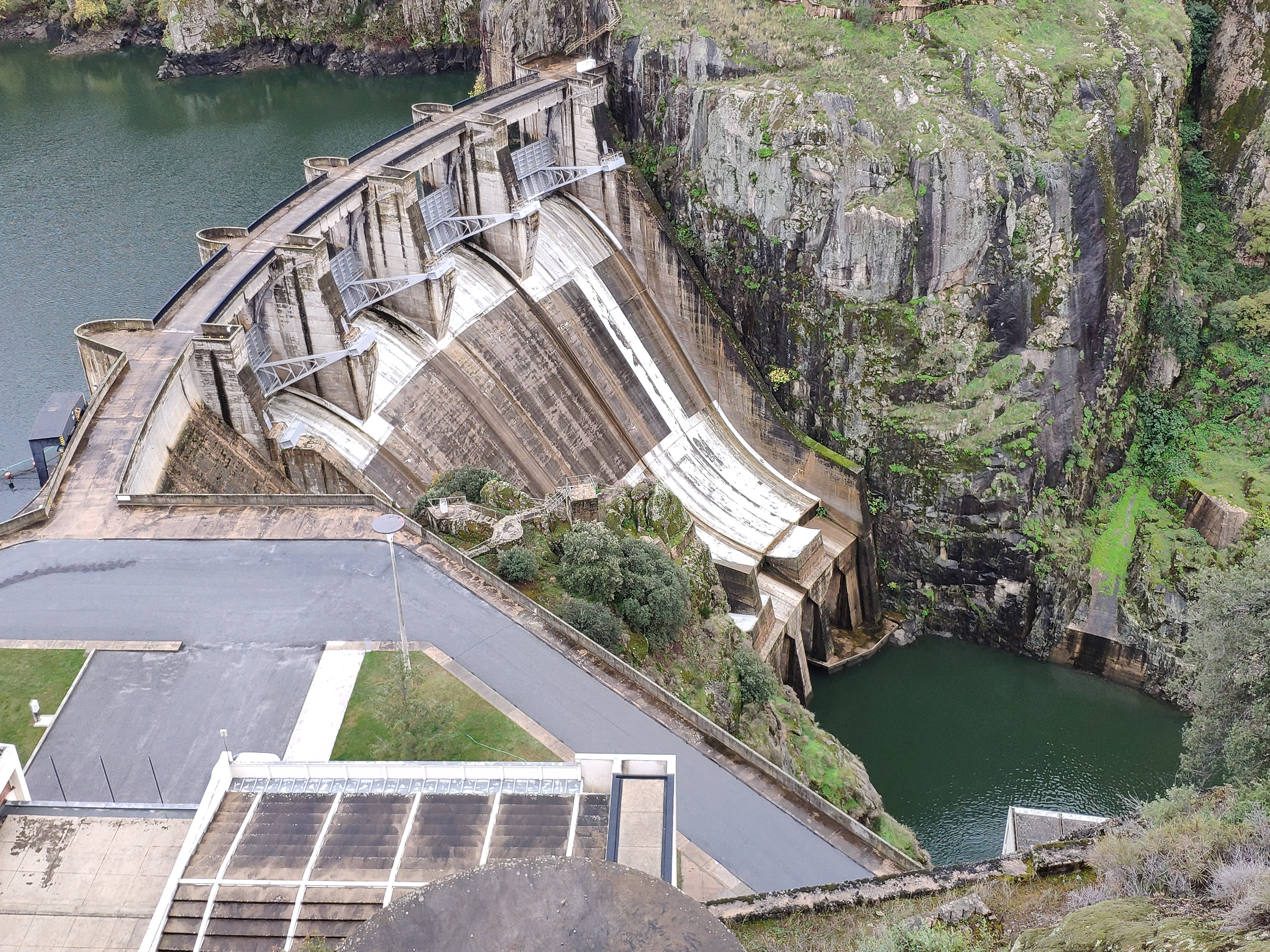

- Location within Portugal
- Official name: Barragem de Picote
- Location: municipality Miranda do Douro, Bragança District, Portugal
- Coordinates: 41°22′41.9″N 6°21′5.7″W
- Purpose: Power
- Status: Operational
- Construction began: 1953
- Opening date: 1958
- Owner: Companhia Portuguesa de Produção de Electricidade

Dam and spillways
- Type of dam: Concrete arch dam
- Impounds: Douro
- Height: 100 m (330 ft)
- Length: 139 metres (456 ft)
- Elevation at crest: 480 m (1,570 ft)
- Width (crest): 3.45 m (11.3 ft)
- Dam volume: 205,000 m^{3} (7,200,000 cu ft)
- Spillway type: Controlled, dam face
- Spillway capacity: 11,000 m^{3}/s (390,000 cu ft/s)

Reservoir
- Total capacity: 63,000,000 m^{3} (51,000 acre⋅ft)
- Active capacity: 13,430,000 m^{3} (10,890 acre⋅ft)
- Catchment area: 63,750 km^{2} (24,610 mi^{2})
- Surface area: 2.44 km^{2} (0.94 mi^{2})

Power Station
- Operator: Energias de Portugal
- Commission date: Picote I: 1958; Picote II: 2011
- Hydraulic head: Picote I: 74 m (243 ft) (max); Picote II: 74 m (243 ft) (static)
- Turbines: Picote I: 3 x 65 MW Francis-type; Picote II: 1 x 246 MW Francis-type
- Installed capacity: Picote I: 195; Picote II: 246 MW
- Annual generation: Picote I: 868.6; Picote II: 244 GWh

Picote Dam (Portuguese: Barragem de Picote) is a concrete arch dam on the Douro, located in the municipality Miranda do Douro, in Bragança District, Portugal.

Construction of the dam began in 1953, and was completed in 1958. It is owned by Companhia Portuguesa de Produção de Electricidade (CPPE). Picote Dam was the first dam constructed by Portugal on the Douro.

== Dam ==
Picote Dam is a 100 m tall (height above foundation) and 139 m long arch dam with a crest altitude of 480 m. The volume of the dam is 205,000 m^{3}. The spillway is located on its crest and is controlled by four tainter gates. It has a maximum discharge of 11,000 m^{3}/s (390,000 cu ft/s) while one bottom outlet can discharge up to 600 m^{3}/s (21,000 cu ft/s).

== Reservoir ==
At full reservoir level of 471 m, (maximum flood level of 478 m) the reservoir of the dam (Portuguese: Albufeira da Barragem de Picote) has a surface area of 2.44 km^{2} with a total capacity of 63 mio. m^{3} (active capacity 13.43 mio. m^{3}).

== Power plant Picote I ==
The power plant Picote I is a run-of-the-river hydroelectric power station with a nameplate capacity of 195 MW. Its average annual generation is 868,6 (838, 941, or 1,038) GWh. The power station contains three 65 MW Francis turbine-generators in an underground powerhouse.

The minimum hydraulic head is 63 m, the maximum is 74 m. Maximum flow per turbine is 117 m^{3}/s.

The plant is owned by CPPE, but operated by EDP.

== Power plant Picote II ==
In March 2007, construction began on the Picote II hydroelectric power plant. In December 2011, work on an additional underground powerhouse was completed and a further turbine with 246 MW went online. Its average annual generation is 244 GWh.

The plant is owned by CPPE, but operated by EDP.

== See also ==
- List of power stations in Portugal
