= Vieira do Minho =

- Municipality
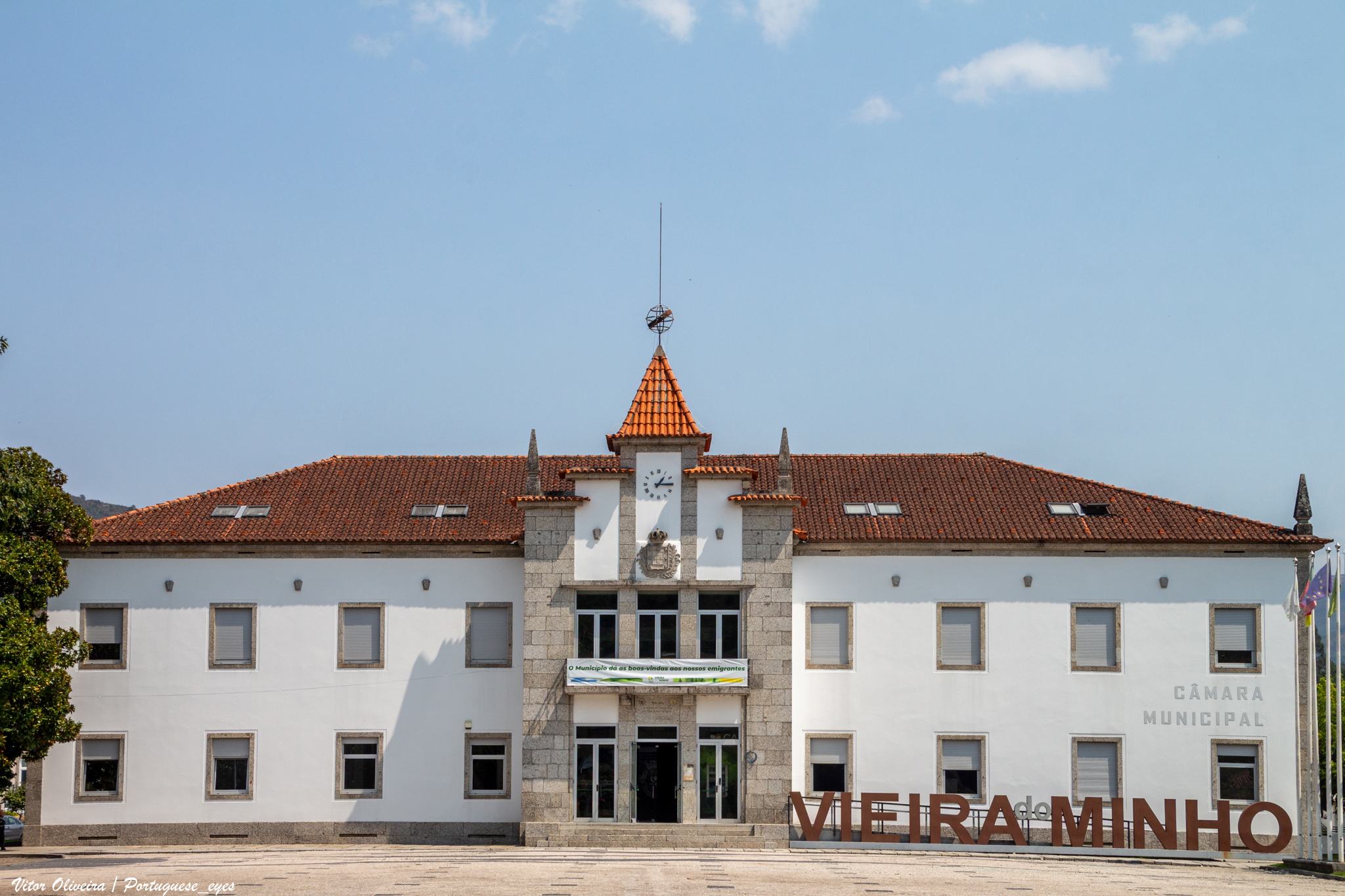
- Town hall

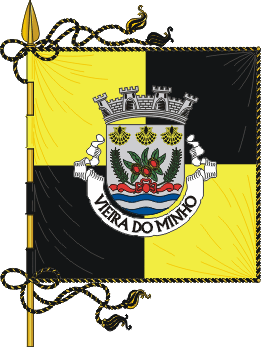
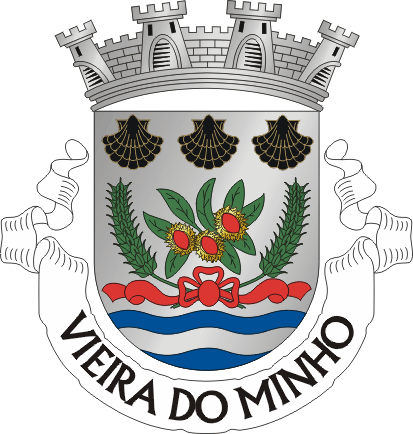
- Flag Coat of arms
- Interactive map of Vieira do Minho
- Coordinates: 41°38′N 8°08′W
- Country: Portugal
- Region: Norte
- Intermunic. comm.: Ave
- District: Braga
- Parishes: 16

Government
  - President: António Cardoso (PSD-CDS–PP)

Area
  - Total: 216.44 km^{2} (83.57 sq mi)

Population (2011)
  - Total: 12,997
  - Density: 60.049/km^{2} (155.53/sq mi)
- Time zone: UTC+00:00 (WET)
  - Summer (DST): UTC+01:00 (WEST)
- Website: www.cm-vminho.pt

Vieira do Minho (Portuguese pronunciation: [viˈɐjɾɐ ðu ˈmiɲu]) is a municipality in the district of Braga, in the north of Portugal. The population in 2011 was 12,997, in an area of 216.44 km^{2}.

The present mayor is António Cardoso, elected by a coalition between PSD and the CDS–PP.

== Parishes ==
Administratively, the municipality is divided into 16 civil parishes (freguesias):

- Anissó e Soutelo
- Anjos e Vilar do Chão
- Caniçada e Soengas
- Cantelães
- Eira Vedra
- Guilhofrei
- Louredo
- Mosteiro
- Parada do Bouro
- Pinheiro
- Rossas
- Ruivães e Campos
- Salamonde
- Tabuaças
- Ventosa e Cova
- Vieira do Minho

== General information ==
Vieira do Minho is essentially a rural municipality. Along with the town of Vieira do Minho, the seat of the municipality, the other major location in the municipality is the town of Rossas with 2,071 inhabitants.

== Notable people ==
- Senhorinha of Basto (942–982) a Portuguese Benedictine abbess
- Manuel Monteiro (born Anissó 1962) a jurist, academic professor and former politician.
- Romeu Ribeiro (born 1989) a footballer with over 350 club caps
