= Cávado River =

River in northern Portugal

Coordinates: 41°32′28″N 08°47′36″W

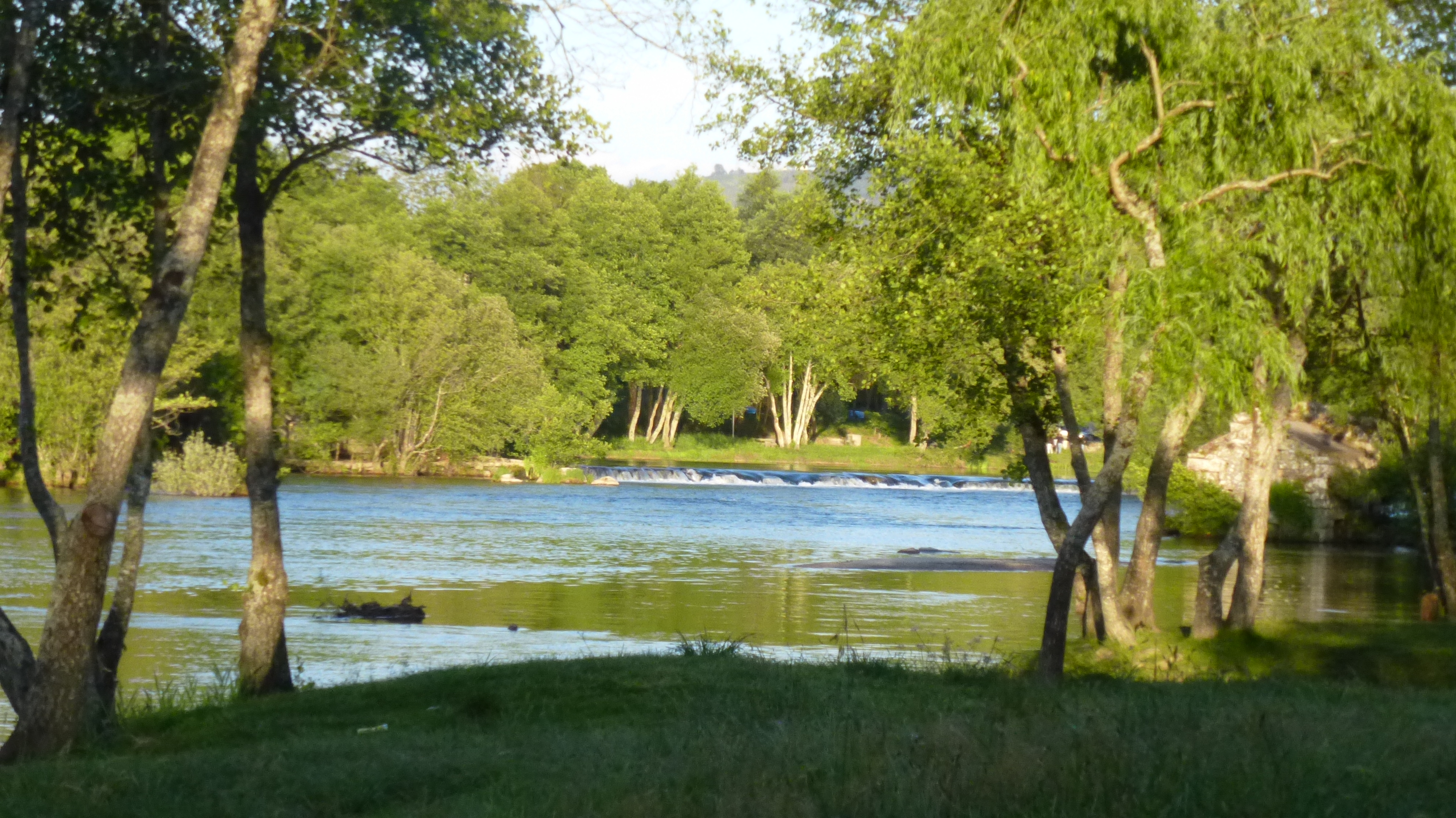

The Cávado River (Portuguese: rio Cávado, pronounced [ˈʁi.u ˈkavɐðu]) is a river located in northern Portugal.

It has its source in Serra do Larouco at an elevation of 1,520 metres (4,990 ft) above sea level. It runs 135 kilometres (84 mi) from Fonte da Pipa, near the triangulation station Larouco, to its mouth into the Atlantic Ocean next to the city of Esposende. It flows through the districts of Vila Real and Braga, in the Cávado Region, and flows near the towns of Vila Verde and Esposende and cities of Braga and Barcelos.

Its tributaries are the Homem River, Rabagão River and Saltadouro River.

== Dams and Reservoirs ==
Beginning at the headwaters, there are 5 dams on the Cávado:

| Dam | Nameplate capacity (MW) | Reservoir | Surface area (km^{2}) | Total capacity (Mio. m^{3}) |
|---|---|---|---|---|
| Alto Cávado | | Alto Cávado | 0.5 | 3.3 |
| Paradela | 54 | Paradela | 3.8 | 164.4 |
| Salamonde | 42 | Salamonde | 2.42 | 65 |
| Caniçada | 60 | Caniçada | 6.89 | 170.6 |
| Penide | 4.8 | Caniçada | 0.69 | 0.5 |

== Gallery ==
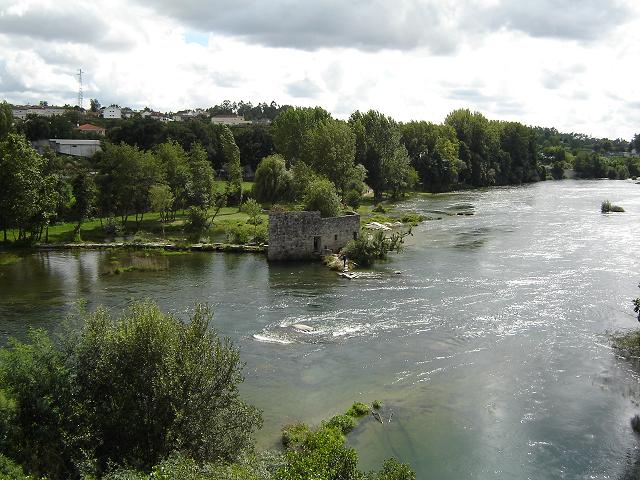
Cávado in Palmeira Braga

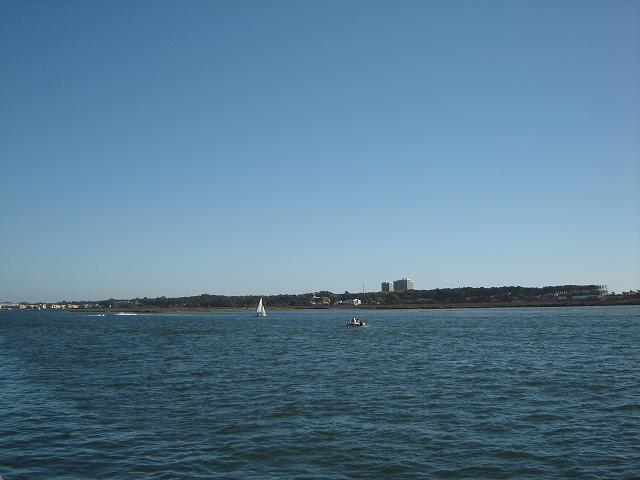
Mouth in Esposende
