= Igreja de São João Baptista =

Igreja de São João Baptista may refer to:

- Igreja de São João Baptista (Alcochete)
- Igreja de São João Baptista (Figueiró dos Vinhos)
- Igreja de São João Baptista (Tomar)
- Igreja de São João Baptista (Cimo de Vila da Castanheira)
- Igreja de São João Baptista (Moura)
