= Sanjurge =

- Civil parish
- Location in Portugal
- Coordinates: 41°46′33″N 7°30′16″W
- Country: Portugal
- Region: Norte
- Intermunic. comm.: Alto Tâmega
- District: Vila Real
- Municipality: Chaves

Area
  - Total: 12.46 km^{2} (4.81 sq mi)
- Elevation: 1,335 m (4,380 ft)

Population (2011)
  - Total: 400
  - Density: 32/km^{2} (83/sq mi)
- Time zone: UTC+00:00 (WET)
  - Summer (DST): UTC+01:00 (WEST)

Sanjurge is a small rural village and former-civil parish in the municipality of Chaves, in the Portuguese district of Vila Real. In 2013, the parish located 6 kilometres (3.7 mi) from the centre of Chaves, was merged into the new parish of Santa Cruz-Trindade e Sanjurge, as part of the White Paper on local authority reform.

== Geography ==
With a population of 400 people in 2011, the small parish covered an area of approximately 12.46 square kilometres (4.81 sq mi) in an area 1,335 feet (407 m) above sea level. The majority of its residents are seniors due to an out-migration, primarily to the United States and France in the late 1970s, early 1980s. There are two coffee shops and bar, located in the centre of the village, single centenary school and recreation center, near the centre of town.

== Architecture ==
- Cruzeiro de Sanjurge (Portuguese: Cruzeiro de Sanjurge)
- Chapel of Nossa Senhora do Rosário (Portuguese: Capela de Nossa Senhora do Rosário de Sanjurge)
- Church of Santa Clara (Portuguese: Igreja Paroquial de Sanjurge/Igreja de Santa Clara)

== Economy ==
The community is primarily involved in agriculture, with the surrounding parcels dedicated to pasturelands and small crops.

== Culture ==
Sanjurge is recognized for its Presunto (a smoked ham) and Folar (a type of bread with different kinds of meat).
