= Santa Cruz-Trindade e Sanjurge =

- Civil parish
- Location in Portugal
- Coordinates: 41.758°N 7.470°W
- Country: Portugal
- Region: Norte
- Intermunic. comm.: Alto Tâmega
- District: Vila Real
- Municipality: Chaves

Area
  - Total: 13.38 km^{2} (5.17 sq mi)

Population (2011)
  - Total: 3,430
  - Density: 260/km^{2} (660/sq mi)
- Time zone: UTC+00:00 (WET)
  - Summer (DST): UTC+01:00 (WEST)

Santa Cruz-Trindade e Sanjurge is a civil parish in the municipality of Chaves, Portugal. It was formed in 2013 by the merger of the former parishes Santa Cruz-Trindade and Sanjurge. The population in 2011 was 3,430, in an area of 13.38 km^{2}.

== Architecture ==
- Chapel of Nossa Senhora do Rosário (Portuguese: Capela de Nossa Senhora do Rosário de Sanjurge)
- Chapel of São Miguel (Portuguese: Capela de São Miguel)
- Church of Sagrada Família (Portuguese: Igreja Paroquial de Santa Cruz e Trindade/Igreja da Sagrada Família)
- Church of Santa Clara (Portuguese: Igreja Paroquial de Sanjurge/Igreja de Santa Clara)
- Cross of Sanjurge (Portuguese: Cruzeiro de Sanjurge)
