= Sanctuary of Nossa Senhora do Engaranho =

- Chapel of Senhora das Necessidades
- Santuário de Nossa Senhora do Engaranho
- Location: Vila Real, Alto Trás-os-Montes, Norte
- Country: Portugal

History
- Dedication: Trofa

Administration
- Diocese: Diocese de

The Sanctuary of Nossa Senhora do Engaranho (Portuguese: Capela da Senhora do Engaranho/Capela da Senhora das Necessidades/Santuário da Senhora do Engaranho) is a church in the civil parish of Calvão e Soutelinho da Raia, in the municipality of Chaves, in the Portuguese Norte Vila Real.

== History ==
The chapel was initially constructed between the 17th and 18th century.

On 16 March 1758, Father Bento Peixoto de Almeida, in the Memórias Paroquiais of the parish of Calvão referred to the existence of the chapel to the invocation of Nossa Senhora das Necessidades (Our Lady of the Necessities) on a hilltop in the eastern part of the parish, approximately a quarter of a league. The record indicated that the roof was still uncovered. At the foot of the chapel is a large stone, known as the Pedra Benta (Blessed Stone), from which a "miraculous spring" flowed that healed the children with rickets in the name of the Virgin Mary. While there were no known pilgrimages to the site, locals from Calvão and Castelões sought the waters to cure or remediate their children's ills. The Senhora do Engaranho (Our Lady of the Steep Hill) or Senhora das Necessidades (Our Lady of Necessities) is the advocate of children general weakness or atrophy, commonly known as rickets, and the annual feast day occurs on the first Sunday of September.

In 1991, a chapel to the invocation of Saint Cajetan was offered by Maria Orfão. Later in the 1990s a similar chapel to the invocation of Saint Blaise was also constructed, in the memory of Jaime Castelo, from his mother, and another by Amadeu and Maria Cunha to the invocation of Saint Benedict.

In 2001, the sanctuary was re-landscaped and a fountain dedicated to Saint James was installed in the spaces. In addition, the works of the parish municipal council of Calvão, included the installation of a shelter, landscaping of the grounds and the placement of stone bunks.

== Architecture ==
The rural sanctuary is situated on the flanks of the Serra do Catrapeiro, isolated within a forest park covered in northern pine and oak, delimited by low stone walls. The park is punctuated by large granite, stone monoliths, on which are situated a cross, band shelter, pond, various stone tables and bunks, as well as a washroom. On the upper platform is the erected chapel, with two support structures for pilgrims during feast days. Alongside the principal facade of the chapel are two stone bunks, flanking the portico. Approximately 500 metres (1,600 ft) distance, in the direction of Calvão is a castro, that was referred by the locals as Outeiro dos Mouros, encircled by two lines of walls.

At the rear of the main chapel is a large granite monolith with a depression filled with water, where the sick children were bathed. To the north is a small fountain, to the invocation of St. James, formed by small indented niche decorated with vegetal acanthus leaves and sculpture of the saint.

Along the path to the chapel, in the north, are small chapels to the invocation of Saint Cajetan and Saint Blais, while a third chapel to Saint Benedict (of recente construction) is situated in the east. The three rectangular chapels have pyramidal ceilings, walls plastered and painted in white and includes front door with straight lintel with aluminum doors, surmounted by inscribed marble plaques. On the chapel of St. Cajetan includes the inscription:

OFERTA DE MARIA ORFÃO 1991 S. CAETANO
Present from Maria Orfão 1991 St. Caetajan

On the chapel of St. Blais the inscription:

EM MEMORIA DE JAIME CASTELO OFERTA DE SUA MÃE S. BRAZ
In memory of Jaime Castelo gift from his mother St. Blais

Over the door of the chapel to St. Benedict:

Homenagem Amadeu e Maria Cunha
Memory of Amadeu and Maria Cunha

Installed on a rectangular platform with step with smooth column, is a parallelepiped plinth and surmounted by cross. Half-way along the column is a ring, while a third is consolidated by a metallic ring.

=== Chapel ===
The longitudinal plan of the chapel includes a rectangular nave preceded by an open porch awning covered in tile. The facade is constructed in irregular granite blocks, with its joins painted in white, while the embasement is encircled by friezes and cornices, with pilasters situated on the corners, surmounted by pinnacles. This facade is oriented to the southwest with two stone, rectangular pillars supporting a cornice of cement and covered. It floor consists of blocks of granite, while the awning is constructed in varnished wood. The chapel is finished in gable topped by iron cross and marked by portal with straight lintel, framed by Tuscan ashlar pilasters, surmounted by a cornice line that supports curved pediment, surmounted by two pyramidal pinnacles, the alignment of the pilasters, and two lateral oval glasses. The left, lateral facade includes a marble plaque and the right lateral faced includes capialço around the altar. The plaque includes:

CASIMIRO CSBELEIRA Residente nos EUA Mandou restaurar as paredes desta Capela
Casimiro CS Beleira Resident of the United States of America restored the walls of this Chapel

To the rear of the chapel is a small niche with a sculpture of the Virgin Mary, surmounted with a stone Latin cross.

The single-nave in granite ashlar are joined and painted white, illuminated by slit on the epistle-side, with stone flooring and varnished wood ceiling. The presbytery includes polychromatic white and gold tiles, with joints in white, and central altar decorated in gilded vegetal motifs on white retable and three images. On the epistle side, next to the altar, there is a little niche for religious items, with front corbel.
