= Castle of Chaves =

Castle in Chaves, Portugal

- Castelo de Chaves
- Vila Real, Alto Trás-os-Montes, Chaves in Portugal
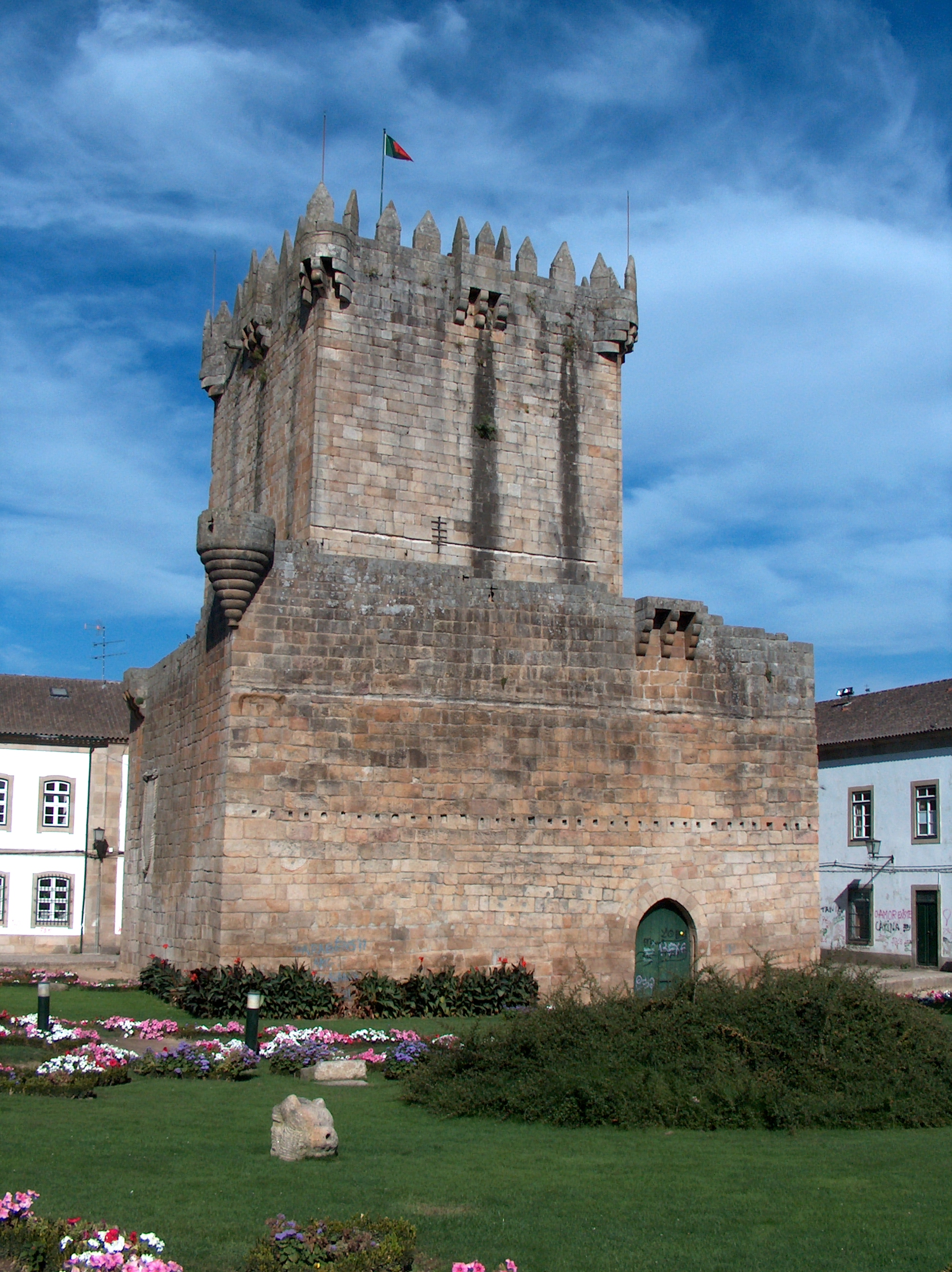

Site information
- Type: Castle
- Owner: Portuguese Republic
- Open to the public: Public

Location
- Coordinates: 41°44′22.6″N 7°28′18.6″W

Site history
- Built: 78 B.C.
- Materials: Granite, Wood, Tile, Stone

Castle of Chaves (Portuguese: Castelo de Chaves) is a medieval castle situated in the civil parish of Santa Maria Maior, in the municipality of Chaves, district of Vila Real.

It is classified as a National Monument.
