= Castle of Mau Vizinho (Vila Real) =

Castle in Chaves, Portugal

- Castelo do Mau Vizinho
- Vila Real, Alto Trás-os-Montes, Chaves in Portugal

Site information
- Type: Castle
- Owner: Portuguese Republic
- Open to the public: Public

Site history
- Materials: Granite, Schist

The Castle of Mau Vizinho (Portuguese: Castelo do Mau Vizinho) is a medieval castle situated in the civil parish of Cimo de Vila da Castanheira, in the municipality of Chaves, district of Vila Real. Also referred to as the Castle of Moors (Portuguese: Castelo dos Mouros), it is literally translated as the Castle of the Bad Neighbour

== History ==
Traditionally thought to be a pre-Roman sanctuary, the site doesn't present the typical structures, such as ritual altars, normally found in other sites in the area (such as Pias dos Mouros in Valpaços, Vilar de Perdizes in Montalegre, or Panóias in Vila Real). Although dates presented in field surveys do not extend to the period, there is an assumption that further archaeological research may substantiate a pre-Roman culture.

Archaeologist António da Eira e Costa first discovered the castle ruins in the late 1960s and early 1970s, and successive excavations were undertaken between 1981 and 1989:

- in the summer of 1981, led by Adérito Medeiros Freitas, Antonio da Eira and Costa and Joaquim Rodrigues dos Santos Junior, promoted clearing and investigation of the layout of the structure;
- in September 1988, were the same team, with the additional participation of Norberto dos Santos Junior, continued clearing and investigation of the layout.
- in September 1989, led by Adérito Medeiros Freitas and António da Eira and Costa, which was completed with funds from the municipality of Chaves.

As a result of this work, the site was classified as a Property of Public Interest by Decree (3 January 1986).

The artifacts unearthed at the site included fragments of medieval ceramics. Archaeological analysis at the site consists of a clay cossoiro, tile fragments, and pottery. The style and technique used during the period correspond to processes employed during the Middle Ages.

== Architecture ==
The castle is situated in an isolated, rural hilltop covered in oak trees, with difficult access to an area the terminates over the valley of the Mousse River, approximately 562 metres (1,844 ft) below. The remains of the rock cliff castle is defended by a line of walls constructed in schist, and held together by clay, with granite corner stones (including cliff stone) that crown the top of the hill. In addition to the first wall of fortification discovered, there are several redoubt along the cliff that may have been associated with a secondary ring of defenses.

The structure consisted of a shale/schist rock fortification and likely included a central turret. The central spaces included 184 square metres (1,980 sq ft) where a mound of mortared schist stone is located in two sections. Externally, there are a number of rock cavities that sheltered perishable materials (likely wood) and represented the second defensive line. The fortifications are accessible from an alignment of stones acting as steps, which are dug into the rock face.
