= Igreja de São João Baptista (Figueiró dos Vinhos) =

Church in Portugal

Coordinates: 39.9027536°N 8.2754899°W

Igreja de São João Baptista is a church in Portugal. It is classified as a National Monument.
