= Church of São João Baptista (Cimo de Vila da Castanheira) =

- Parochial Church of Cimo de Vila da Castanheira
- Igreja de São João Baptista
- Church of São João Baptista
- 41°47′55.3″N 7°16′5.2″W
- Location: Vila Real, Alto Trás-os-Montes, Norte
- Country: Portugal
- Denomination: Roman Catholic

History
- Dedication: St. John the Baptist

Administration
- Diocese: Diocese of Vila Real

The Church of São João Baptista (Portuguese: Igreja Paroquial de Cimo de Vila de Castanheira/Igreja de São João Baptista) is a church in the civil parish of Cimo de Vila da Castenheira, in the municipality of Chaves, in the Portuguese Norte district of Vila Real.

== History ==
The church was probably constructed between the 13th and 14th century.

By 1758, the curia of Castanheira were presented by the rector of Sanfins, annexed to the brotherhood of the Company of Christ, in the Colegio od Coimbra, supported by 60$000 in land rents. On 4 July 1774, D. José incorporated all the possessions of the extinct Company of Christ into the property of the University of Coimbra, which assumed its administration.

On 5 May 1835, a decree incorporated the church into the Bens Próprios Nacionais (national assets) of the university, but continued to operate independently with the same land rents. But, by 21 November 1848, there was a new law passed to delimit what which possessions the university required function in Coimbra.

In 1984, there was a collapse of the nave's ceiling and lateral cornices; the masonry was damaged and various decorative elements were destroyed.

== Architecture ==
The church is located in a rural, isolated area, implanted in a mountainous zone, alongside the cemetery (which is located to the rear).

The church is planted longitudinally, composed by two volumes: a rectangular nave and secondary section with sacristy addorsed to the northern wall. The main facade is oriented to the west, featuring a portal with perfect arch, composed of high chamfered staves over a smooth base and surmounted by small central oculus. Over the portal are three protrusions that mark the disappeared awning that use to exist, while over the frontispiece is a stone cross. On the southern facade along the nave wall has a chamfered Romanesque door and rectangular window. The eastern facade has a rectangular window along the sacristy. Along with a simple cornice, the north facade conserves sculpted representations of humans and animals.
