= Igreja de São João Batista (Moura) =

Church in Moura, Portugal

Coordinates: 38.1432792°N 7.4493893°W

Igreja de São João Baptista is a church in Portugal. It is classified as a National Monument.
