= Chaves, Portugal =

Chaves
- Municipality
- City of Chaves
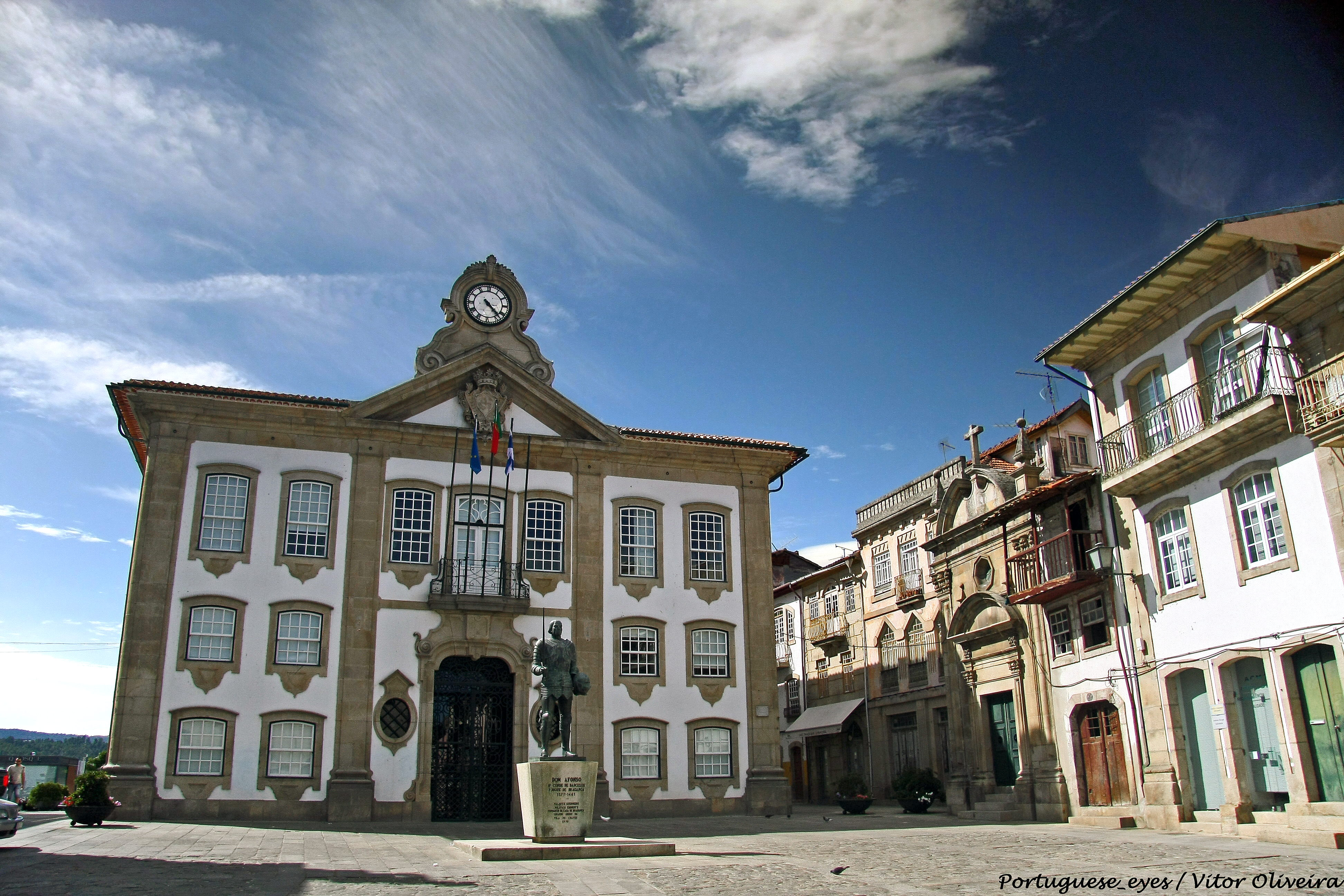
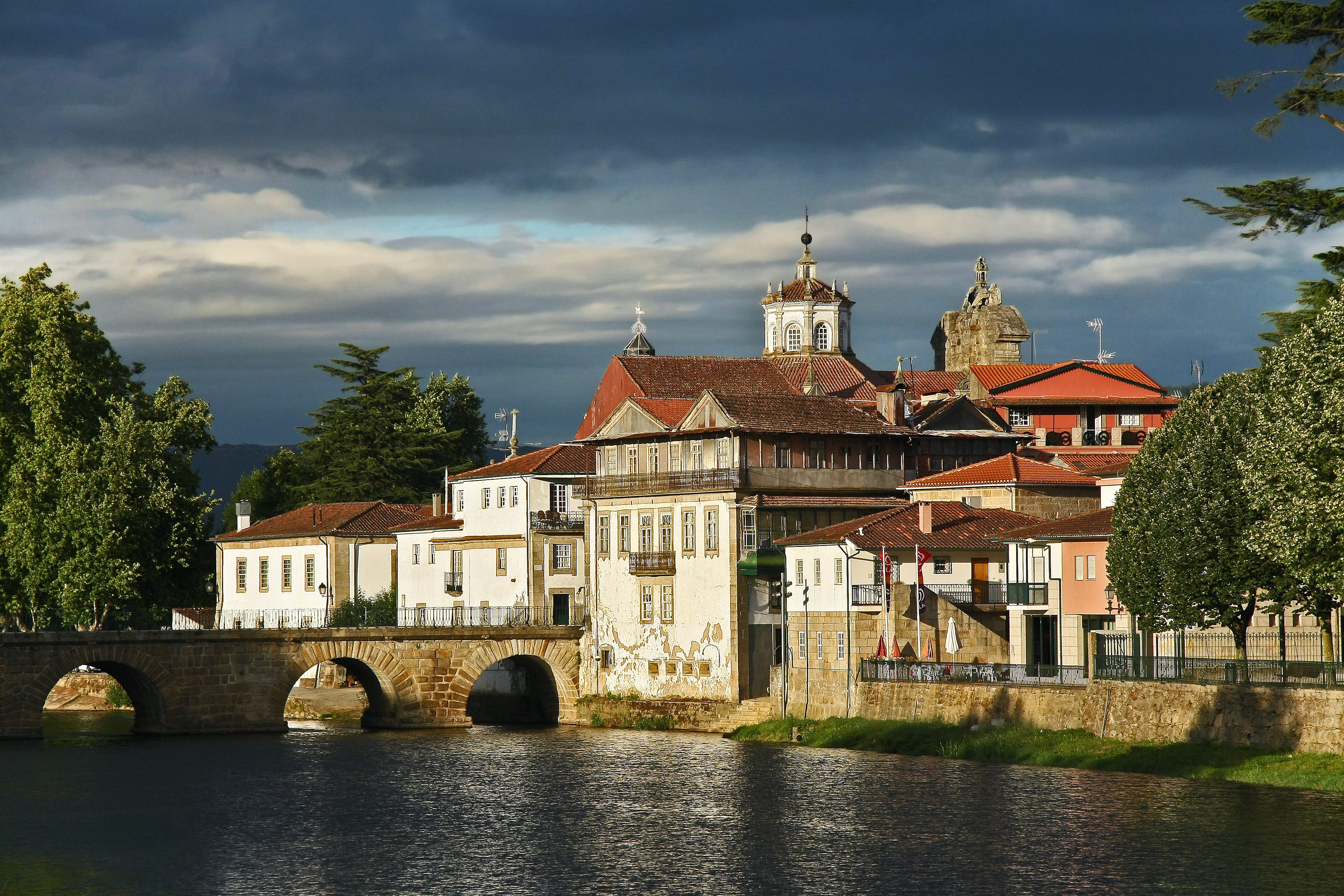
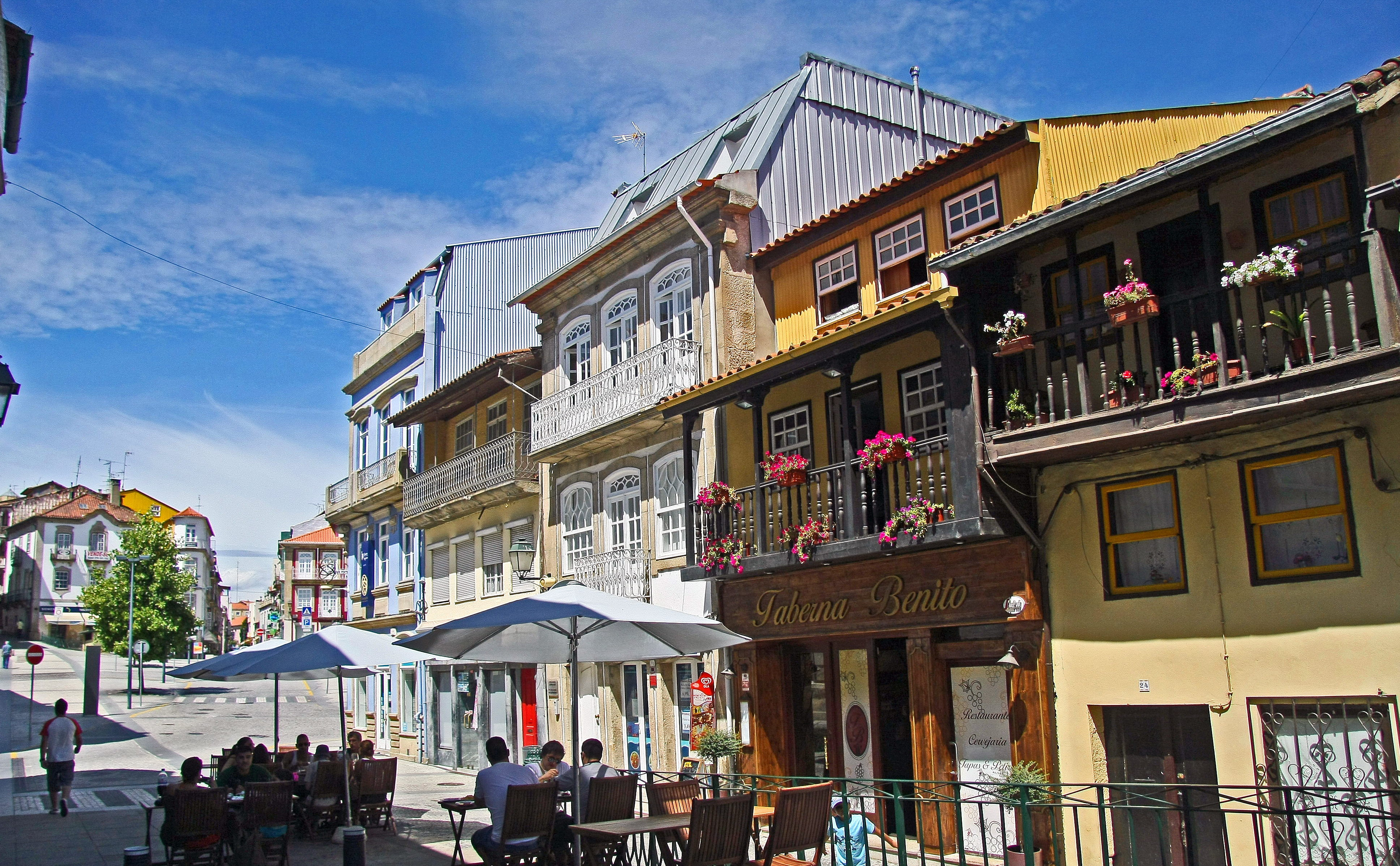
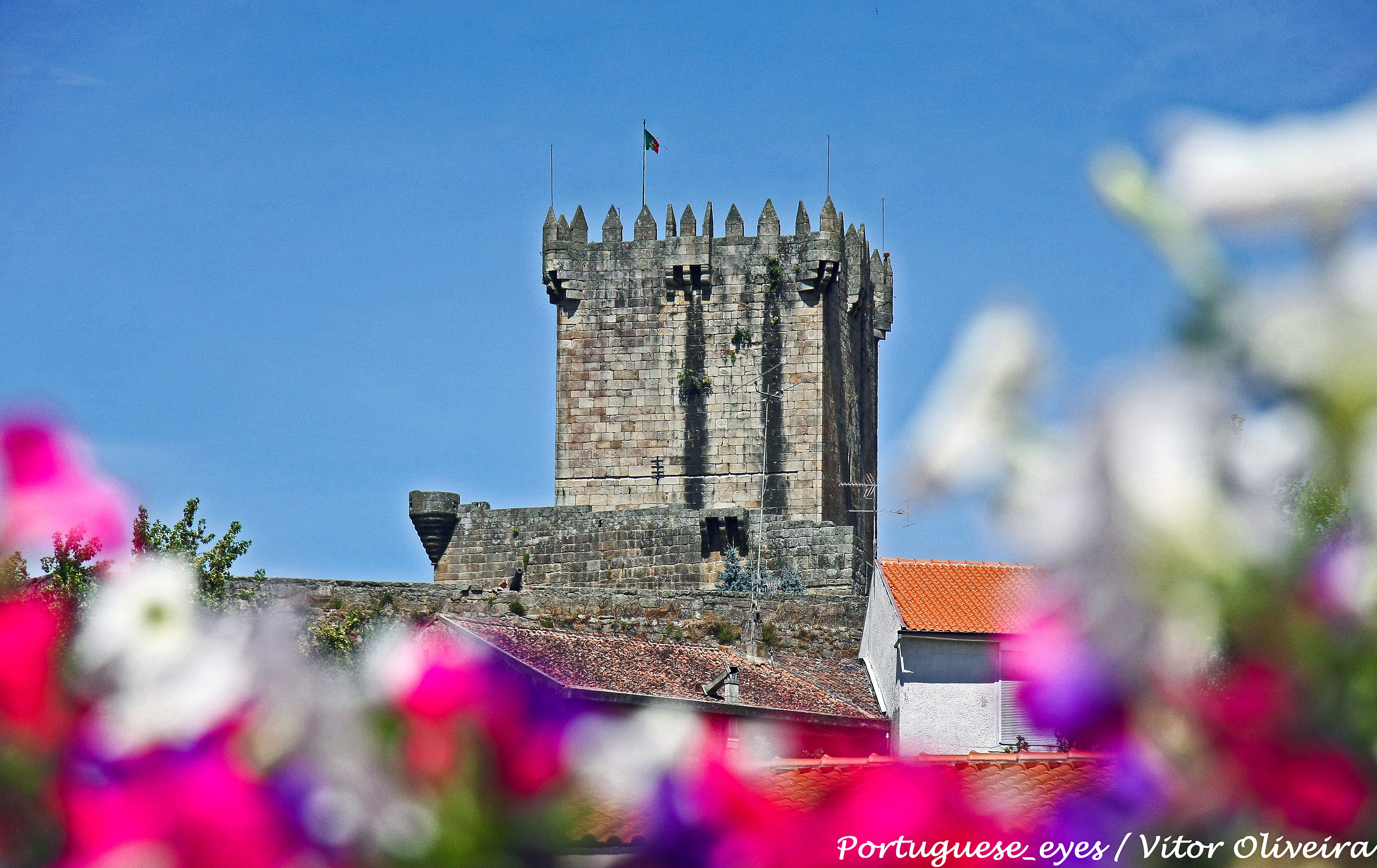
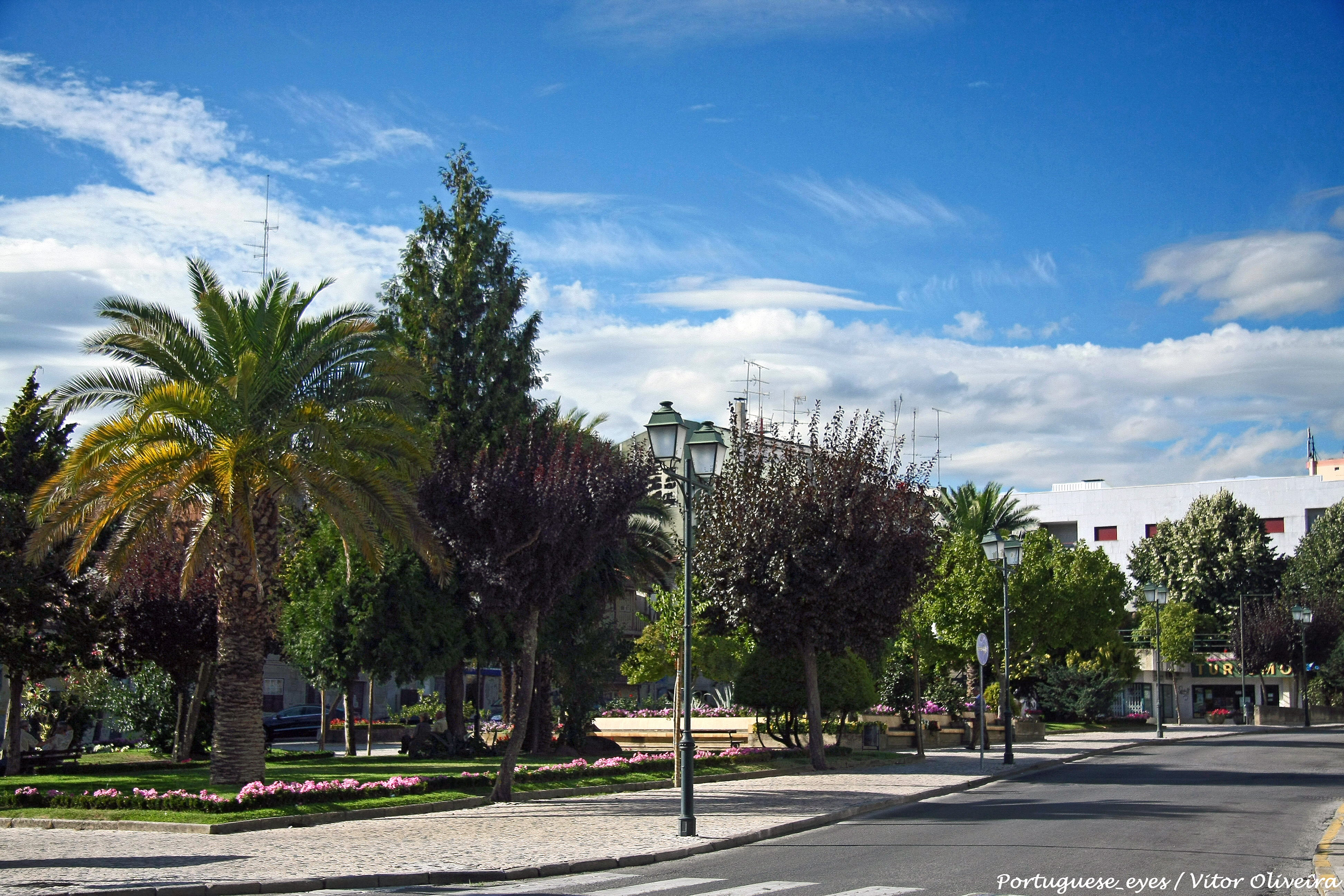
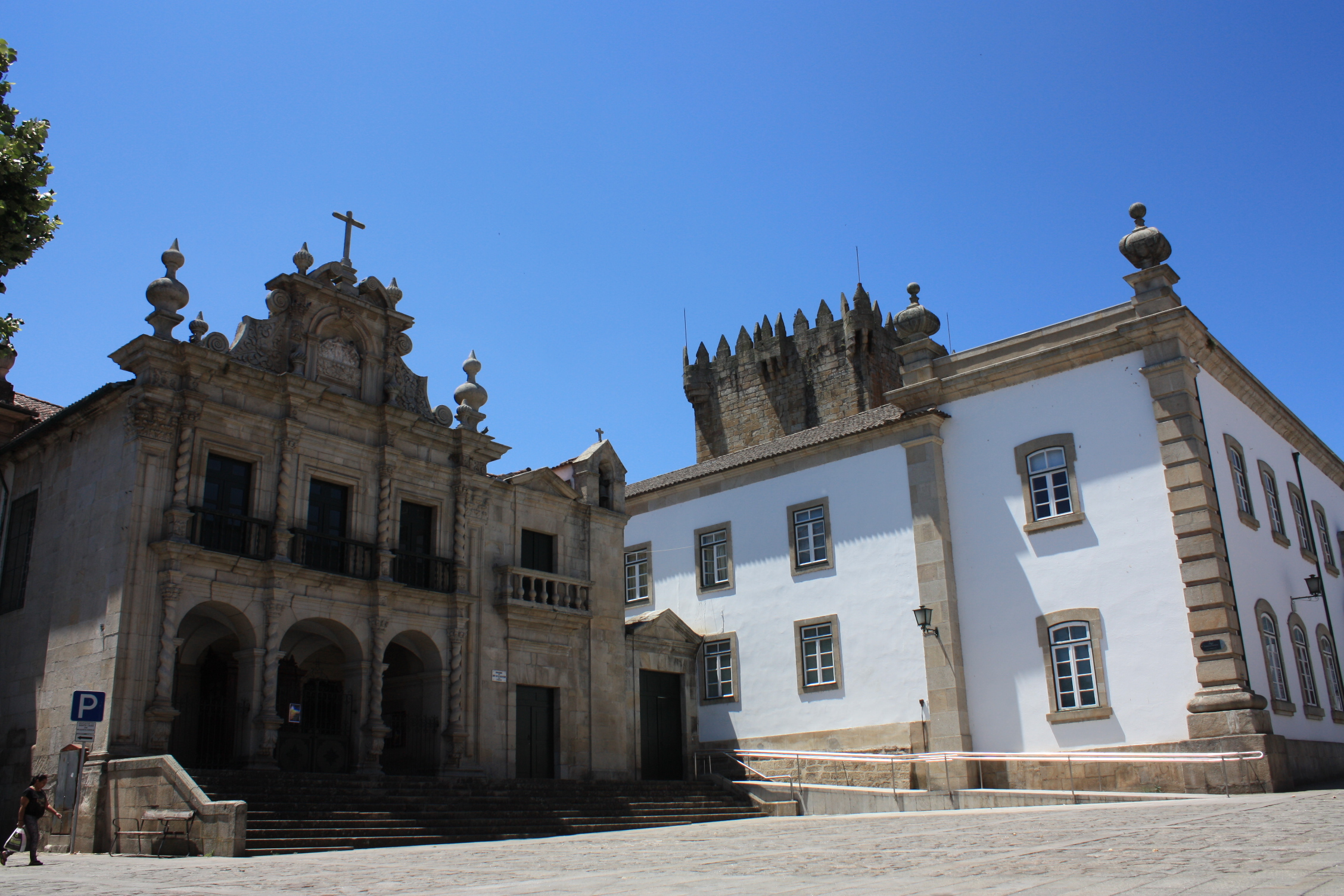
- From top left to right: The Câmara Municipal de Chaves (City Hall), the Tâmega River, the typical balconies, the keep, one of the central gardens and one of the two churches. Pelourinho Square

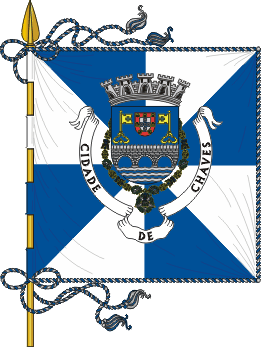
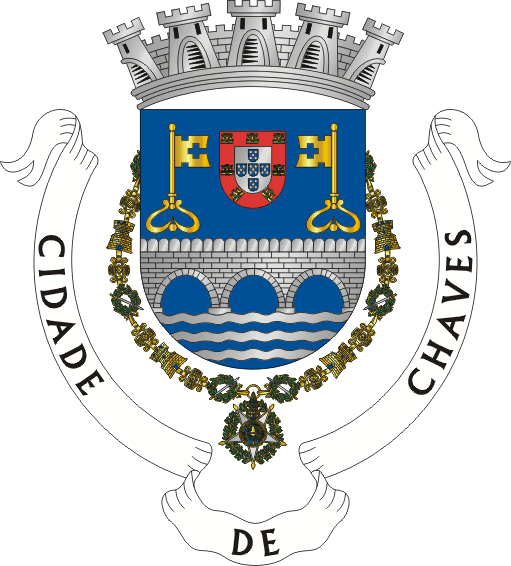
- Flag Coat of arms
- Interactive map of Chaves
- Location in Portugal
- Coordinates: 41°44′26″N 7°28′17″W
- Country: Portugal
- Region: Norte
- Intermunic. comm.: Alto Tâmega
- District: Vila Real
- Parishes: 41 (see text)

Government
  - President: Nuno Vaz (PS)

Area
  - Total: 591.23 km^{2} (228.28 sq mi)
- Elevation: 371 m (1,217 ft)

Population (2011)
  - Total: 41,243
  - Density: 69.758/km^{2} (180.67/sq mi)
- Time zone: UTC+00:00 (WET)
  - Summer (DST): UTC+01:00 (WEST)
- Postal code: 5400
- Area code: 276
- Patron: Nossa Senhora da Livração
- Website: http://www.chaves.pt

Chaves (European Portuguese pronunciation: [ˈʃavɨʃ]), officially the City of Chaves (Portuguese: Cidade de Chaves), is a city and a municipality in the north of Portugal. It is 10 km south of the Spanish border and 22 km south of Verín (Spain). The population of the entire municipality in 2011 was 41,243, in an area of 591.23 km^{2}. The municipality is the second most populous of the district of Vila Real (the district capital, Vila Real, is 60 km south on the A24 motorway). With origins in the Roman civitas Aquæ Flaviæ, Chaves has developed into a regional centre. The urban area or city proper has 17,535 residents (2001).

== History ==
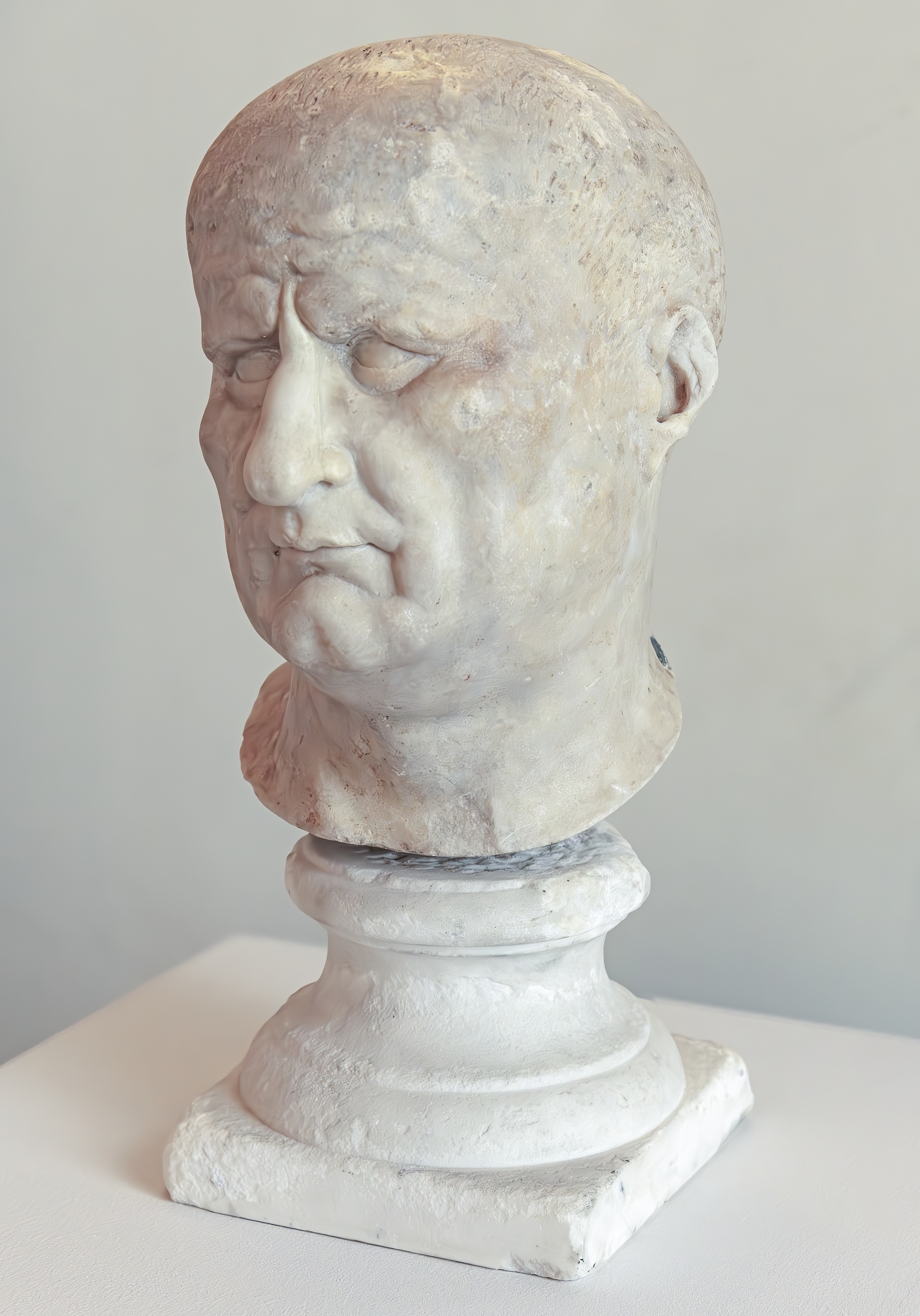
Titus Flavius Caesar Vespasianus Augustus, patron of Aquae Flaviae

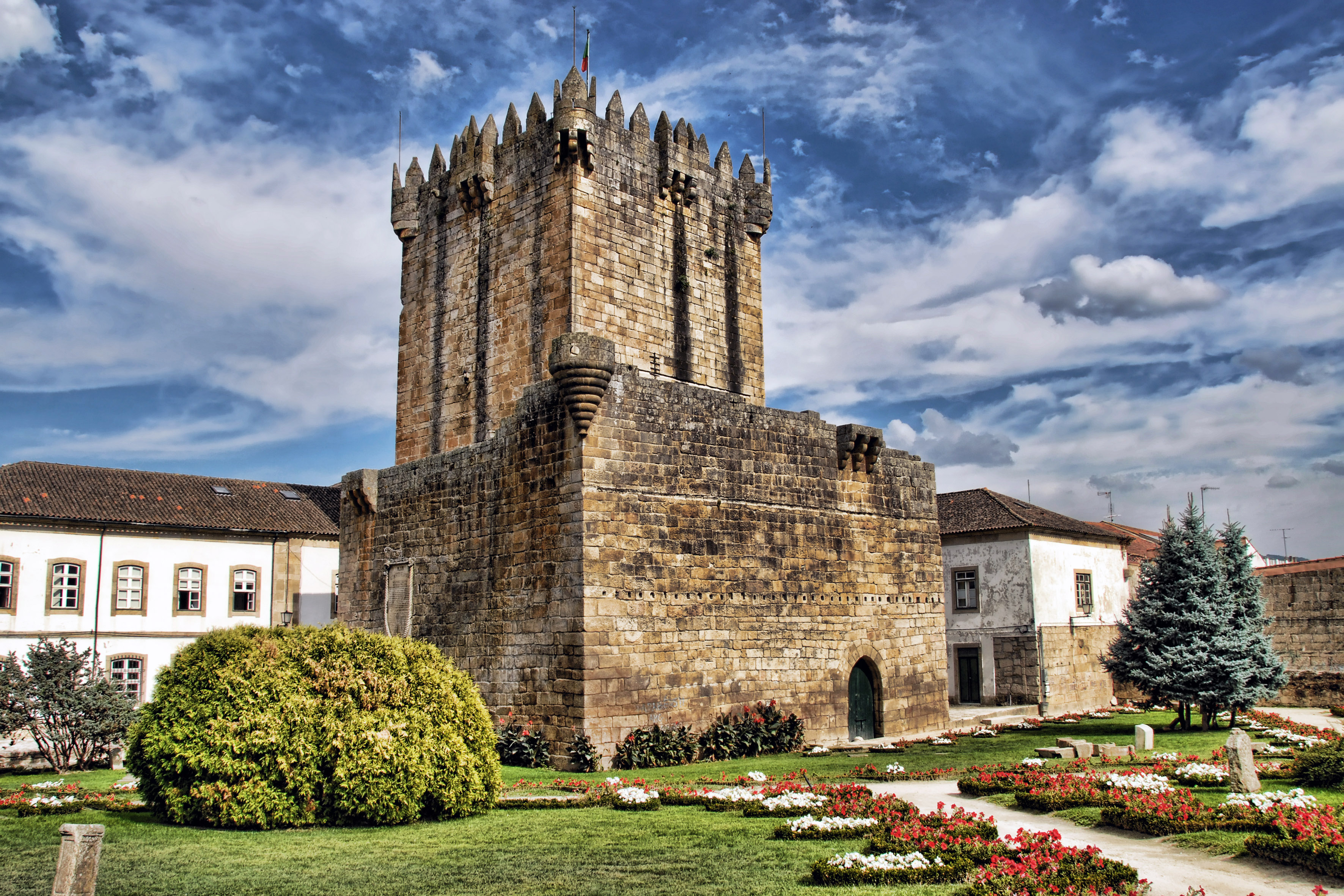
Remnants of the ancient keep of the Castle of Chaves

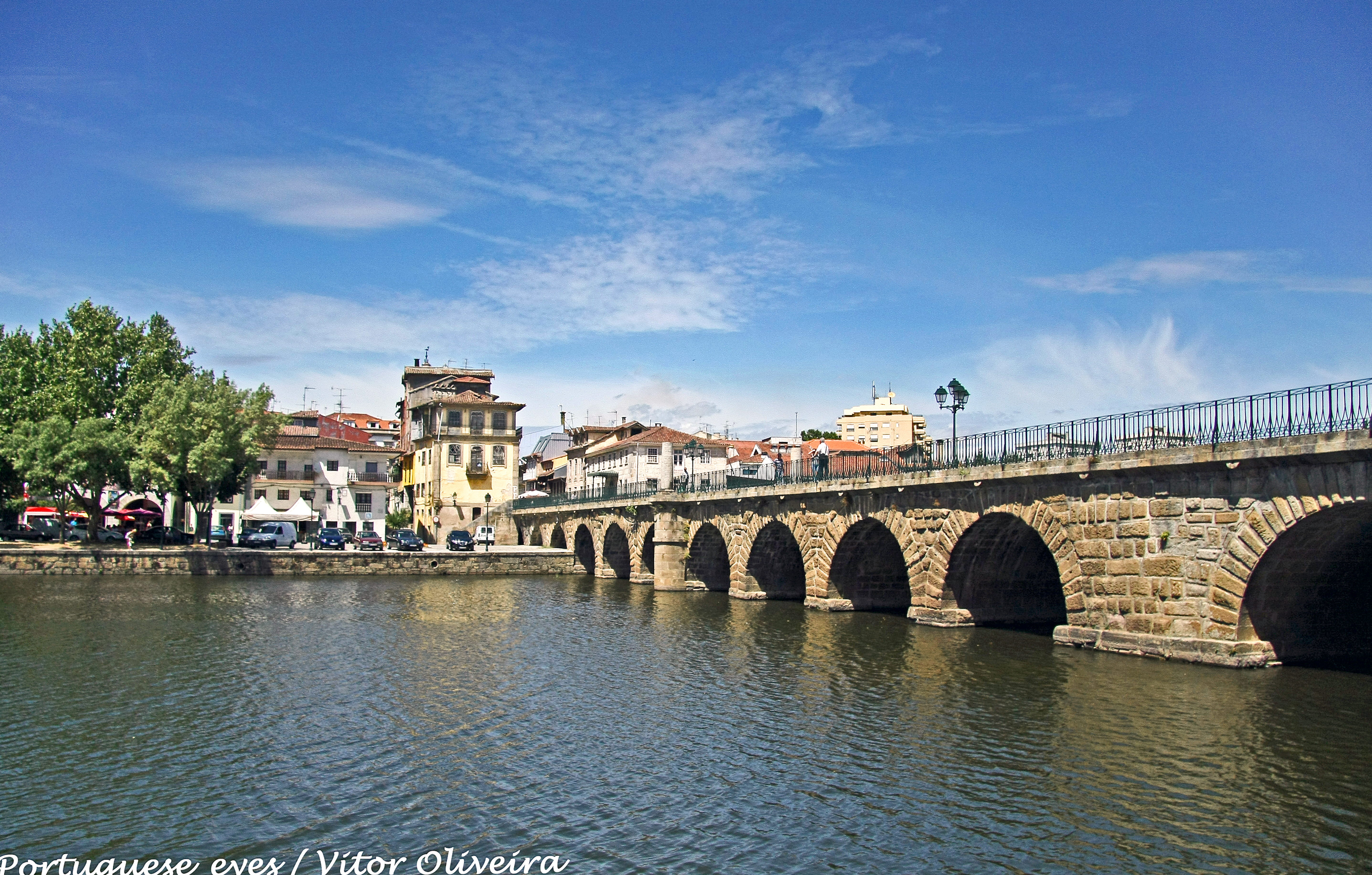
Roman bridge of Emperor Trajan crossing the Tâmega river

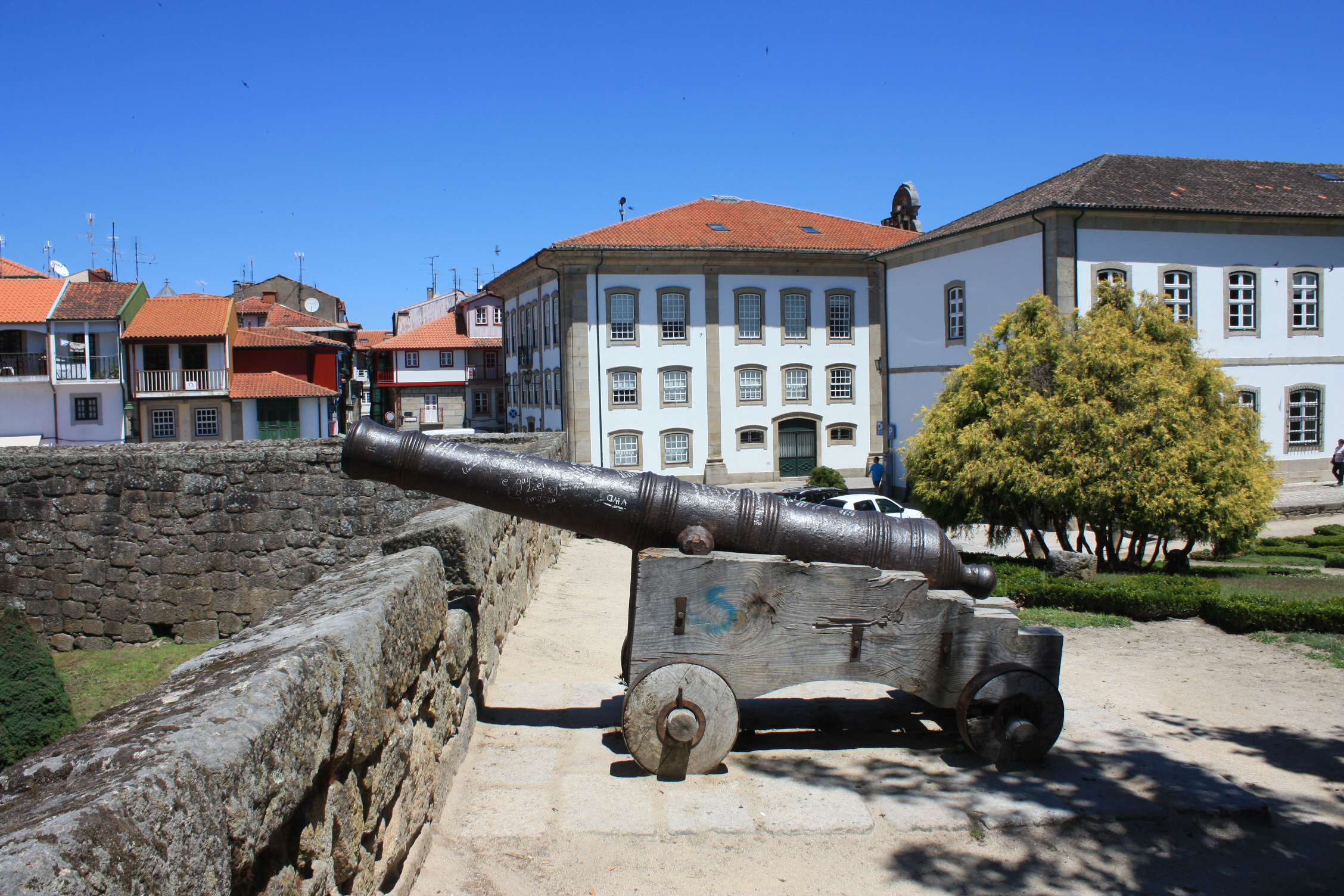
Cannon near the castle

Artefacts discovered in the region of Chaves identify the earliest settlement of humans dating back to the Paleolithic. Remnants discovered in Mairos, Pastoria and São Lourenço, those associated with transient proto-historic settlements and castros, show a human presence in the Alto Tâmega dating to the Chalcolithic. The region has seen persistent human settlement since Roman legions conquered and occupied the fertile valley of the Tâmega River, constructing a nascent outpost and taking over the existing castros in the area. The settlement was located at the convergence of three important Roman roads: the Bracara Augusta, Asturica, and Lamecum that crossed the Roman Province of Gallaecia, linking Rome to the region's natural resources. It was a military centre known for its baths, which lasted until the 16th century. This civilisation constructed protective walls to protect the local population; spanned the river with the bridge; promoted the baths (with its warm medicinal waters); exploited local mines and alluvial deposits and other natural resources. Its importance led to the urban nucleus being elevated to the status of municipality in 79 AD, during the reign of the first Flavian Caesar, Titus Flavius Caesar Vespasianus Augustus. Its benefactor consequently influenced its toponymy, becoming known as Aquae Flaviae. Artefacts from the area around the Matriz church indicate that Aquae Flaviae's centre was located in this place, in addition to an ancient headstone showing gladiatorial combat.

Rome's hegemony lasted until the 3rd century, when, successively, the proto-Germanic tribes of the Suebi and Visigoths as well as the Alani colonized the imperial settlements of Chaves. Wars between Remismund and Frumar followed over their claims to the throne, which almost completely destroyed the village (it was settled in favour of Frumar, who imprisoned Idácio, the notable Bishop of Aquae Flaviae). Ironically, the Romans were complicit in Aquae Flaviae's near destruction. Barbarian dominion lasted until the Moors invaded from North Africa, defeating the Visigoth King Roderic at the beginning of the 8th century.

In course, the name of Aquae Flaviae began to disappear, being supplanted by the more Hispanic-sounding Aquae Calidae (English: hot waters).

The area around Chaves surrendered to invading Islamic forces at around 714-716, forcing many resisting Christians to escape from Chaves into the mountains in the northwest. The city was conquered by Alfonso I of Asturias in 773, alongside Braga, Porto and Lamego, and repopulated in 868 by Alfonso III of Asturias. Battles between the Christians and Muslim forces then continued until the 11th century, when Alfonso V of León permanently reconquered Coimbra, establishing a firm buffer-zone to the south. He reconstructed, settled and encircled the settlement of Chaves with walls, in addition to establishing a Jewish quarter in the community. It was in the reign of Afonso I of Portugal that it was taken from León and firmly integrated into the Kingdom of Portugal domain (1160). Owing to its geographic location (on Portugal's northern frontier with Spain), King Denis, ordered the construction of a castle to protect the kingdom's border.

During the reign of Afonso II, when the king continued to provoke the ire of the Papacy, Portuguese knights attacked the Galician tenancy of his half-brother Martin Sanches (who lived in the kingdom of Alfonso IX of León), possibly since the Bishop of Braga had estates in that region. Provoking Sanches to invade northern Portugal. The Leonese fought battles in Barcelos, Braga and Guimarães, where they defeated Portuguese forces, before retiring to Galicia with their spoils. At the same time, Alfonso IX of León seized Chaves, which remained in Leonese hands until the reign of King Sancho II, when he and Ferdinand III met in 1230/1231. This was likely a self-serving decision on Fernando's part, as he was fearful that Leonese barons would support Sancho against him. Alfonso IX continued to occupy Chaves as a method of ensuring his wife, Teresa, would be able to enjoy her properties in Portugal.

During the Portuguese Interregnum, the nobility of Chaves supported Beatrice of Portugal, as she was heir presumptive to King Ferdinand I, since he left no male heirs. The potential loss of independence of Portugal, through her marriage to John I of Castile resulted in the rebellion by the Master of the Order of Aviz (later King John I of Portugal), who would garner the support of the Portuguese Cortes, thus laying the seeds for his triumph at the Battle of Aljubarrota. Yet, many nobles refused to break their oaths of fealty to Beatrice (including in Chaves), necessitating John's travel to Porto in force and scaring the nobles of Chaves and Bragança into capitulating.

The remnants of the Roman baths, and the houses used to assist the invalid, were demolished by the Count of Mesquitella at the end of the 17th century, in order to reinforce the defense of Chaves.

French forces invaded and attacked in 1807, during the Siege of Chaves, part of the Peninsular Wars. On 7 March 1808, Soult's forces invaded northern Portugal to remove British forces from Iberia. Brigadier Francisco Silveira was charged with the defense of Chaves, but his 6000 men were unable to support its defense, and quickly abandoned the castle. An attempt to defend Chaves by Francisco Pizarro was futile, and the city surrendered to French forces shortly after the engagement. With too many troops to imprison Soult released many under oath, in order to continue the attack on the main forces who had retreated to the south. But Francisco Silveira did not quit, and as the main French went on to defeat the Anglo-Portuguese alliance at the First Battle of Porto, Silveira retook Chaves.

On 20 September 1837, the Convention of Chaves, which followed the Battle of Ruivães and which ended Chartist or Marshall's Revolt, was signed in Chaves. Chaves was also a site of various religious apparitions, during the decade of 1830, eventually resulting in the construction of the Santuário da Nossa Senhora Aparecida (Portuguese: Sanctuary of Our Lady Revealed).

On 8 July 1912, forces loyal to the former monarchy, under the command of Henrique Paiva Couceiro, confronted government forces, commanded by Colonel Ribeiro de Carvalho, during the second monarchist incursion.

On 12 March 1929, the town of Chaves was elevated to the category of city.

== Geography ==
=== Physical geography ===
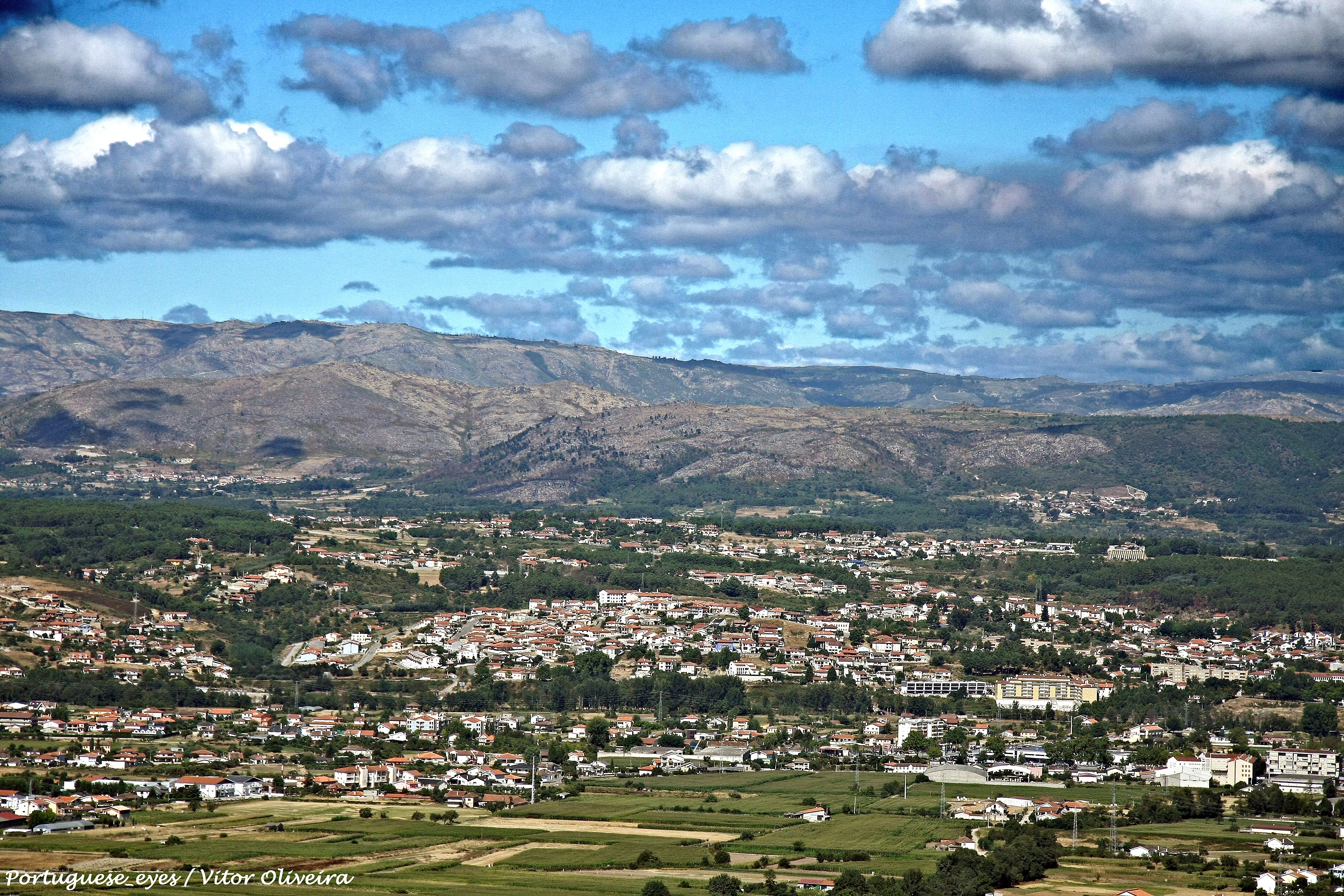
Chaves is sheltered by mountains on both sides

Chaves is in the extreme north of Portugal, bounded on the north by Galicia (Spain), on the east by the municipalities of Vinhais and Valpaços, on the south by the municipality of Vila Pouca de Aguiar and on the west by the municipalities of Montalegre and Boticas. Chaves is one of the six municipalities of the Alto Tâmega, situated in the district of Vila Real, strategically positioned in the northwest of the Iberian peninsula and accessed by important international highways.

The region is dominated by the Quaternary Chaves sedimentary basin, a graben aligned on a north-northeast to south-southwest orientation bounded by the Hercynian massif and metamorphic schistose formations. Mixed with the schistose complex, there are bands of graphitic slates, mainly in the southern part of the urbanized area of Chaves and south-east of Faiões. To the north, and into Galicia, the basin extends into the depression of the Verin Basin. One of the oldest formations in the region, it dates back to the Ordovician period ( between 488.3±1.7 to 443.7±1.5 million years ago), is composed of schist and graywacke deposits. During the Ordovician-Silurian geological periods quartzites and schists were formed, metamorphosed by Hercynian granitic intrusions, at the end of the Paleozoic.

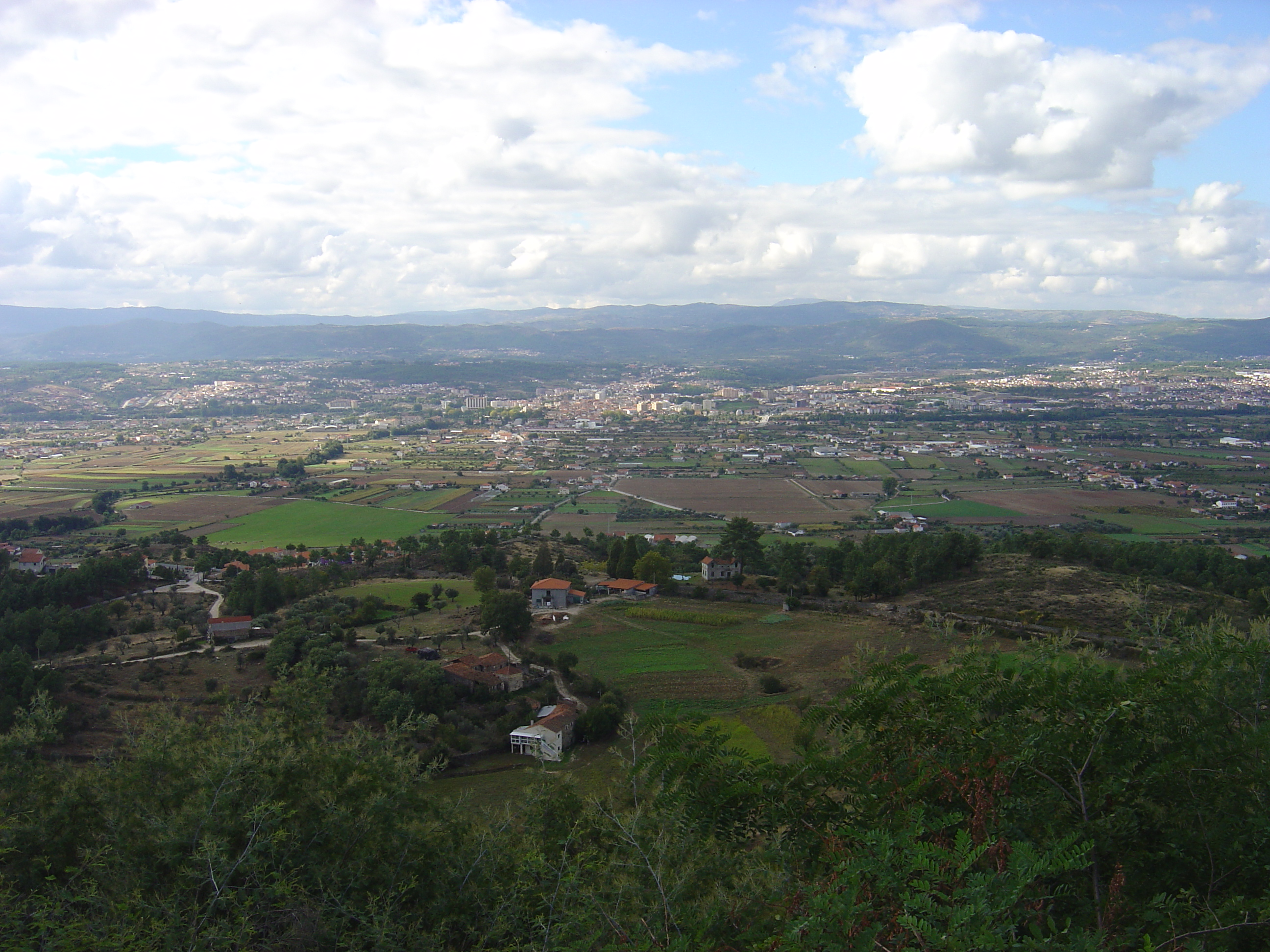
A glimpse of the sedimentary Chaves basin, consisting of the parishes of Santa Maria Maior and Madalena

The Alpine orogeny was the main cause of extensive tectonic activities and it was responsible for the formation of the hydrothermal field within the region. The Chaves graben was formed by the relative motion of the block with different types of sediments being settled. The most recent formations are a sedimentary series (lacustrine, alluvial, colluvial, detritic, etc.) with variable thickness that had their origin during the Miocene. Two main faults cross and influence the tectonic activities: the north-northeast by south-southeast Chaves-Verin Fault and a fault system crossing near Faiões and Santo Estêvão. The first fault developed from late Hercynian tectonic episode occurring between 280 and 300 million years ago, that developed into an almost north–south direction into the lithosphere. Intense neotectonic activity reactivated these old fractures, originating in a complex pattern of faults in the sedimentary basin.

==== Thermal springs ====
Mineral waters are the clearest evidence of these recent tectonic fractures. The Penacova-Régua-Verín Fault, is an active formation that extends longitudinally for 500 kilometres, intermingled with other faults resulting in subterranean hydrology. The thermal springs, principally those in Campilho and Salus Vidago (in Vila de Vidago) have developed from this mixture of circumstances. With temperatures reaching 73 °C (163 °F), these mineral springs (bicarbonates, sodium, silicates and fluoride) in the vicinity of the city of Chaves, have provided a potential source of income.

The hot springs (Portuguese: Caldas) were known since the Roman period, when the town was Aquae Flaviae; the Waters of Flavius were an important social gathering point, but fell into disuse as the town was slowly abandoned by attacks. The spas belong to a vast area of hydrothermal springs that stretch from Verín (in Galicia) to Pedras Salgadas, 30 km from Chaves (on the road to Vila Real). Despite its vastness and abundance of water, this thermal system is little utilized; of the nine groups of thermal springs there are only adequate installations in four of them: Chaves, Carvalhelhos, Vidago, Pedras Salgadas, and Verín. The waters of the spring, that are captured in three springs within Chaves, have mean temperatures of 73 °C (163 °F) (the hottest bicarbonate waters in Europe). The modern spa industry in Chaves use these waters for numerous treatments, including stomach, liver, intestinal, and kidney ailments, through oral ingestion. Many small guesthouses in the old part of the town are dependent on the influx of these visitors. The thermal spas are located between the castle and the river, in front of a large area of grass-covered park with playgrounds and tennis courts.

=== Climate ===
Snow in wintertime, in the shadow of the Castle Keep.

Chaves has a Mediterranean climate (Köppen: Csa) with continental and oceanic influences.

The mountains between the Minho region and Trás-os-Montes serve as a climatic barrier and lessen rainfall closer to the interior. Places such as the Peneda-Gerês National Park, only 50 km (31 mi) away, can have up to five times the amount of precipitation Chaves gets in a year. Winters can be cold; January highs rarely surpass 15 °C (59 °F) and lows are often below zero (54 days per year on average). Fog often hovers over the valley during the winter, usually lifting by midday, but on rare occasions can last for days, and can potentiate the development of rime ice. Cold fronts in the winter can often cause daytime temperatures to drop below 5 °C (41 °F). Snow is infrequent, especially in recent years, although the surrounding hills often receive a dusting. Temperatures in July and August frequently pass 30 °C (86 °F) with nighttime temperatures dropping to 13–14 °C (55–57 °F). Summer brush fires can often make this season unpleasant although in recent years they have diminished, perhaps because most of the forest cover has been burnt. Chaves is one of the few places in Portugal with a dry March. The coldest temperature ever recorded in Chaves was −8.5 °C (16.7 °F) on 22 January 1983.

== Climate ==
Climate data for Chaves (1991–2020)
Month	Jan	Feb	Mar	Apr	May	Jun	Jul	Aug	Sep	Oct	Nov	Dec	Year
Record high °C (°F)	19.1 (66.4)	23.3 (73.9)	27.5 (81.5)	30.0 (86.0)	35.6 (96.1)	40.0 (104.0)	39.8 (103.6)	41.3 (106.3)	39.5 (103.1)	33.9 (93.0)	23.3 (73.9)	18.6 (65.5)	41.3 (106.3)
Mean daily maximum °C (°F)	11.1 (52.0)	13.7 (56.7)	17.3 (63.1)	19.1 (66.4)	22.9 (73.2)	27.5 (81.5)	30.8 (87.4)	30.9 (87.6)	27.0 (80.6)	20.9 (69.6)	14.6 (58.3)	11.4 (52.5)	20.6 (69.1)
Daily mean °C (°F)	6.2 (43.2)	7.5 (45.5)	10.4 (50.7)	12.6 (54.7)	15.8 (60.4)	19.6 (67.3)	22.1 (71.8)	22.0 (71.6)	19.0 (66.2)	14.5 (58.1)	9.5 (49.1)	6.8 (44.2)	13.8 (56.8)
Mean daily minimum °C (°F)	1.4 (34.5)	1.3 (34.3)	3.6 (38.5)	6.0 (42.8)	8.7 (47.7)	11.8 (53.2)	13.5 (56.3)	13.1 (55.6)	10.9 (51.6)	8.2 (46.8)	4.4 (39.9)	2.3 (36.1)	7.1 (44.8)
Record low °C (°F)	−8.5 (16.7)	−8.2 (17.2)	−9.1 (15.6)	−2.1 (28.2)	−1.0 (30.2)	3.2 (37.8)	5.0 (41.0)	3.1 (37.6)	2.5 (36.5)	−1.6 (29.1)	−9.8 (14.4)	−10.5 (13.1)	−10.5 (13.1)
Average precipitation mm (inches)	85.1 (3.35)	49.5 (1.95)	63.9 (2.52)	58.7 (2.31)	63.8 (2.51)	25.0 (0.98)	15.1 (0.59)	17.8 (0.70)	36.9 (1.45)	91.3 (3.59)	86.7 (3.41)	92.7 (3.65)	686.6 (27.03)
Average precipitation days (≥ 1 mm)	9.7	6.4	7.4	8.5	7.9	4.1	1.9	2.0	4.7	9.7	9.5	8.6	80.5
Source: Instituto Português do Mar e da Atmosfera

Climate data for Chaves, elevation: 360 m or 1,180 ft, 1971–2000 normals and extremes
Month	Jan	Feb	Mar	Apr	May	Jun	Jul	Aug	Sep	Oct	Nov	Dec	Year
Record high °C (°F)	18.5 (65.3)	22.0 (71.6)	27.5 (81.5)	30.0 (86.0)	33.5 (92.3)	40.0 (104.0)	40.5 (104.9)	40.5 (104.9)	39.5 (103.1)	31.0 (87.8)	23.5 (74.3)	22.0 (71.6)	40.5 (104.9)
Mean daily maximum °C (°F)	10.7 (51.3)	13.7 (56.7)	17.4 (63.3)	18.2 (64.8)	21.8 (71.2)	26.8 (80.2)	30.7 (87.3)	30.6 (87.1)	26.9 (80.4)	20.5 (68.9)	14.8 (58.6)	11.6 (52.9)	20.3 (68.6)
Daily mean °C (°F)	5.8 (42.4)	7.6 (45.7)	10.3 (50.5)	12.0 (53.6)	15.1 (59.2)	19.1 (66.4)	22.0 (71.6)	21.7 (71.1)	18.9 (66.0)	14.0 (57.2)	9.9 (49.8)	7.2 (45.0)	13.6 (56.5)
Mean daily minimum °C (°F)	0.8 (33.4)	1.5 (34.7)	3.1 (37.6)	5.8 (42.4)	8.3 (46.9)	11.4 (52.5)	13.4 (56.1)	12.8 (55.0)	10.9 (51.6)	7.8 (46.0)	4.9 (40.8)	2.9 (37.2)	7.0 (44.5)
Record low °C (°F)	−8.5 (16.7)	−7.7 (18.1)	−5.5 (22.1)	−3.0 (26.6)	−2.5 (27.5)	2.0 (35.6)	5.0 (41.0)	3.1 (37.6)	2.0 (35.6)	−1.8 (28.8)	−5.0 (23.0)	−8.0 (17.6)	−8.5 (16.7)
Average rainfall mm (inches)	73.0 (2.87)	47.1 (1.85)	27.2 (1.07)	65.2 (2.57)	56.5 (2.22)	26.7 (1.05)	18.4 (0.72)	19.8 (0.78)	38.7 (1.52)	73.3 (2.89)	88.8 (3.50)	102.1 (4.02)	636.8 (25.06)
Average precipitation days	11.7	9.0	6.9	11.5	11.7	5.3	3.6	3.0	6.4	9.5	12.3	13.2	104.1
Average snowy days	0.6	0.3	0.1	0.2	0	0	0	0	0	0	0	0.2	1.4
Source: Instituto de Meteorologia

=== Human geography ===
Government is administered by the Municipal Chamber of Chaves (Portuguese: Câmara Municipal de Chaves), while locally the municipality is divided into the following parishes (freguesias):

- Águas Frias
- Anelhe
- Bustelo
- Calvão e Soutelinho da Raia
- Cimo de Vila da Castanheira
- Curalha
- Eiras, São Julião de Montenegro e Cela
- Ervededo
- Faiões
- Lama de Arcos
- Loivos e Póvoa de Agrações
- Maços
- Madalena e Samaiões
- Mairos
- Moreiras
- Nogueira da Montanha
- Oura
- Outeiro Seco
- Paradela
- Planalto de Monforte (Oucidres e Borbadela)
- Redondelo
- Sanfins
- Santa Cruz-Trindade e Sanjurge
- Santa Leocádia
- Santa Maria Maior
- Santo António de Monforte
- Santo Estêvão
- São Pedro de Agostém
- São Vicente
- Soutelo e Seara Velha
- Travancas e Roriz
- Tronco
- Vala de Anta
- Vidago, Arcossó, Selhariz e Vilarinho das Paranheiras
- Vila Verde da Raia
- Vilar de Nantes
- Vilarelho da Raia
- Vilas Boas
- Vilela do Tâmega
- Vilela Seca

==== Demographics ====
Population of Chaves (1801 - 2011)
Year	Pop.	±%
1801	31,651	—
1849	17,356	−45.2%
1864	31,815	+83.3%
1900	36,781	+15.6%
1930	40,702	+10.7%
1960	57,243	+40.6%
1981	45,883	−19.8%
1991	40,940	−10.8%
2001	43,667	+6.7%
2011	41,243	−5.6%

In the past 127 years, the municipality has seen a 29% increase in local population (from 31815 in 1864 to 40940 in 1991). This was not a gradual nor homogeneous increase, since there were periods of extreme growth or rapid decline. During the 20th century, growth after 1920 is notably influenced by the restriction of trans-Atlantic emigration, just like after 1991, the population decreases were associated with liberal emigration policies as a result of the Maastricht Treaty.

The parish populations have seen fluctuations, although the most recent census show that 31 of these agglomerations had population levels in 1991 much lower than their first tabulation. Further, analysis of the data identifies that the municipal increase (29%) was primarily from the more urbanized parishes, while peripheral rural/mountainous parishes show net decreases. Many of the local people have emigrated to settlements in northern Europe in addition to France, but commonly return or visit their villages for weddings or village festivals. Many residents of Chaves have also immigrated to Connecticut and New Jersey in the United States.

Chaves has been isolated from the coastal urban centres and has suffered from a lack of convenient road communications. Recently, a new four-lane highway (A24) was opened to traffic. It links Chaves to Vila Real, and to the border with Spain. In Vila Pouca de Aguiar the highway also connects with the A7 that leads to Porto.

==== City ====
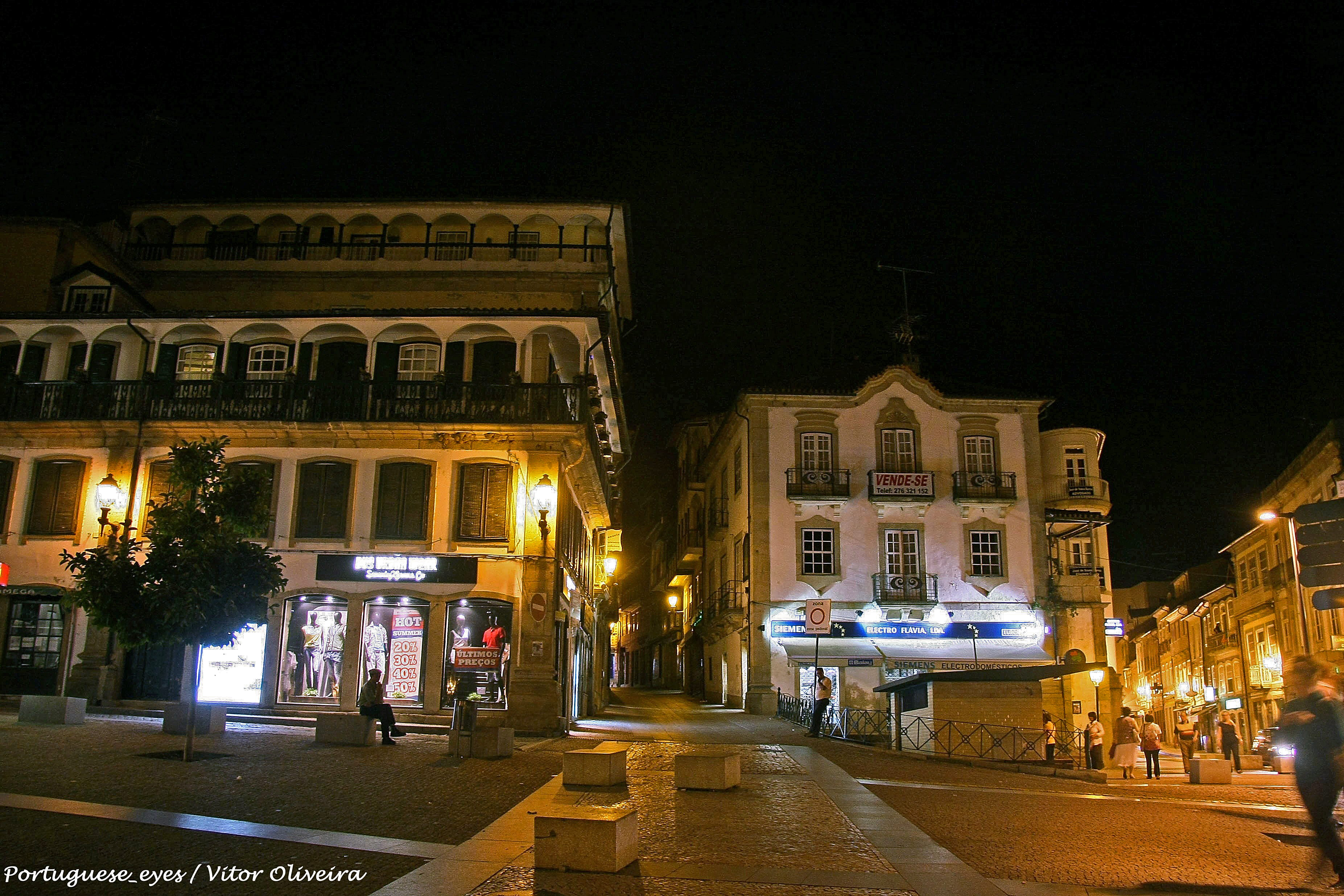
Chaves nightlife

The population of the city encompasses 17,535 residents in the parishes of Santa Cruz-Trinidade, Madalena, and Santa Maria Maior: these parishes form the urbanized population of the city of Chaves.

Although many of the older buildings outside the historical walls were demolished to make way for apartment blocks, the medieval quarter with its Rua Direita and Rua de Santo António have been declared historic zones. In these areas there are narrow multi-story dwellings, whose origin has been limited by the walled city. Historically, the old quarter was the city, and few buildings were located outside its walls, since its frontier location and the imminent risk of invasion impeded the construction of homes outside the barriers. Consequently, space was limited and land primarily used for multi-purpose dwellings, resulting in very narrow streets and multi-story structures (with balconies that extend over the streets and protected the citizenry). Many of the lower floors were occupied by shops or small businesses, while the residents lived in the upper stories. Remnants of these verandas are still visible in the medieval quarter.

The walled city was at the forefront of the political turmoils during the Reconquista, transited by armies and sacked by enemies. Chaves was built, destroyed, and rebuilt several times by either faction (Christian and Muslim), when they occupied the castle (it is likely that for some periods the town was completely abandoned). In 1253, Afonso III supported the reconstruction of the castle. By 1258, Chaves was granted the status of a vila (or town). While the walls were eventually rebuilt, the advent of artillery would make the castle's fortifications obsolete, and its importance waned, while the historical battlements fell into ruins.

On 15 November 2009 an extensive green space on the east side of the Tâmega River, between the Engenheiro Carmona Bridge and the Public Gardens, was opened to the public. It is an area with playgrounds, pedestrian and cycling paths, a beach football pitch, and a large grassy area. A modern pedestrian bridge was constructed to link the park and recreational area with the hot springs on the west bank of the river. At the same time cycling and walking paths were built on both banks of the river extending north for several kilometers. The pedestrian bridge, which is approximately 90 ft, is Chave's tallest and most expensive bridge.

== Economy ==
Agriculture and services are still the main sources of income. The traditional prosperity of Chaves comes, mainly, from a highly fertile plain, nine kilometres long and three to five wide, referred to as the"veiga". Since the land can be irrigated with canals there is intensive farming of potatoes, corn, rye, hay, while plots of vegetables are also commonplace in the local market. The main canal begins near Vila Verde da Raia and crosses the valley on the right bank of the Tâmega as far as Nantes. On the whole, the land is made up of small plots that are rarely economically viable. There is some dairy farming, and a milk production unit on the south side of town, but few cows can be seen in the valley. In general most of the farmers are of retirement age and farming is often pursued more as a hobby than as a profession.

In addition to agriculture there are some small industries producing glass, tiles, and food products. Like Vila Pouca de Aguiar, located thirty kilometres south, this is a land of granite; there are several granite extraction and finishing industries located in Chaves, in addition to three brickworks, located on the south side of the city. Further, two mineral water plants, located in Vidago, belong to the municipality.

=== Transportation ===
It is serviced by A24 motorway, which links Chaves with the south, to Viseu, Coimbra and Figueira da Foz, connecting to Vila Pouca de Aguiar by the A7 (which acts as the gateway to the southern Trás-os-Montes), and the N103 from Bragança to Braga. Chaves is located 415 kilometres from Lisbon, 105 kilometres from Porto and just 55 kilometres from the district capital, Vila Real.

Between 1921 and 1990 Chaves was the northern terminus station of the Corgo line, a narrow gauge railway line which linked Chaves with Vila Real and Regua (the junction station for main line trains to Porto). The section between Chaves and Vila Real closed in 1990 and the remainder of the line closed in 2009.

Chaves Airport, a small, single runway airport for light aircraft, also serves the town.

== Architecture ==
The town of Chaves is built upon a long military history, that includes many fortifications or vestiges of battlements. Apart from the medieval castle and 17th century forts (Forte de São Francisco andForte de São Neutel), two medieval fortifications still exist: Santo Estêvão Tower (in the village of the same name north of Chaves) and Monforte Castle (in the hills east of the town).

=== Prehistoric ===
- Bulideira Stone (Portuguese: Pedra Bulideira/Pedra Bolideira)
- Castro of Alto do Vamba (Portuguese: Povoado do Alto do Vamba)
- Castro of Curalha (Portuguese: Povoado fortificado da Curalha/Castelo)
- Castro of Muradal (Portuguese: Povoado fortificado de Loivos/Povoado fortificado Muradal)
- Castro of Outeiro dos Mouros (Portuguese: Povoado do Outeiro dos Mouros)
- Castro of Santiago do Monte (Portuguese: Povoado fortificado de Santiago do Monte/Crastas de Santiago)
- Castro of Vale de Lagares (Portuguese: Vale de Lagares)
- Prehistoric Rock-Art Site of Bustelo (Portuguese: Santuário Rupestre de Bustelo/Fraga das Passadas)
- Prehistoric Rock-Art Site of Eiras (Portuguese: Santuário Rupestre de Eiras)
- Prehistoric Rock-Art Site of Outeiro Machado (Portuguese: Gravuras rupestres de Outeiro Machado/Estação rupestre de Outeiro Machado/Outeiro dos Machados)

=== Civic ===
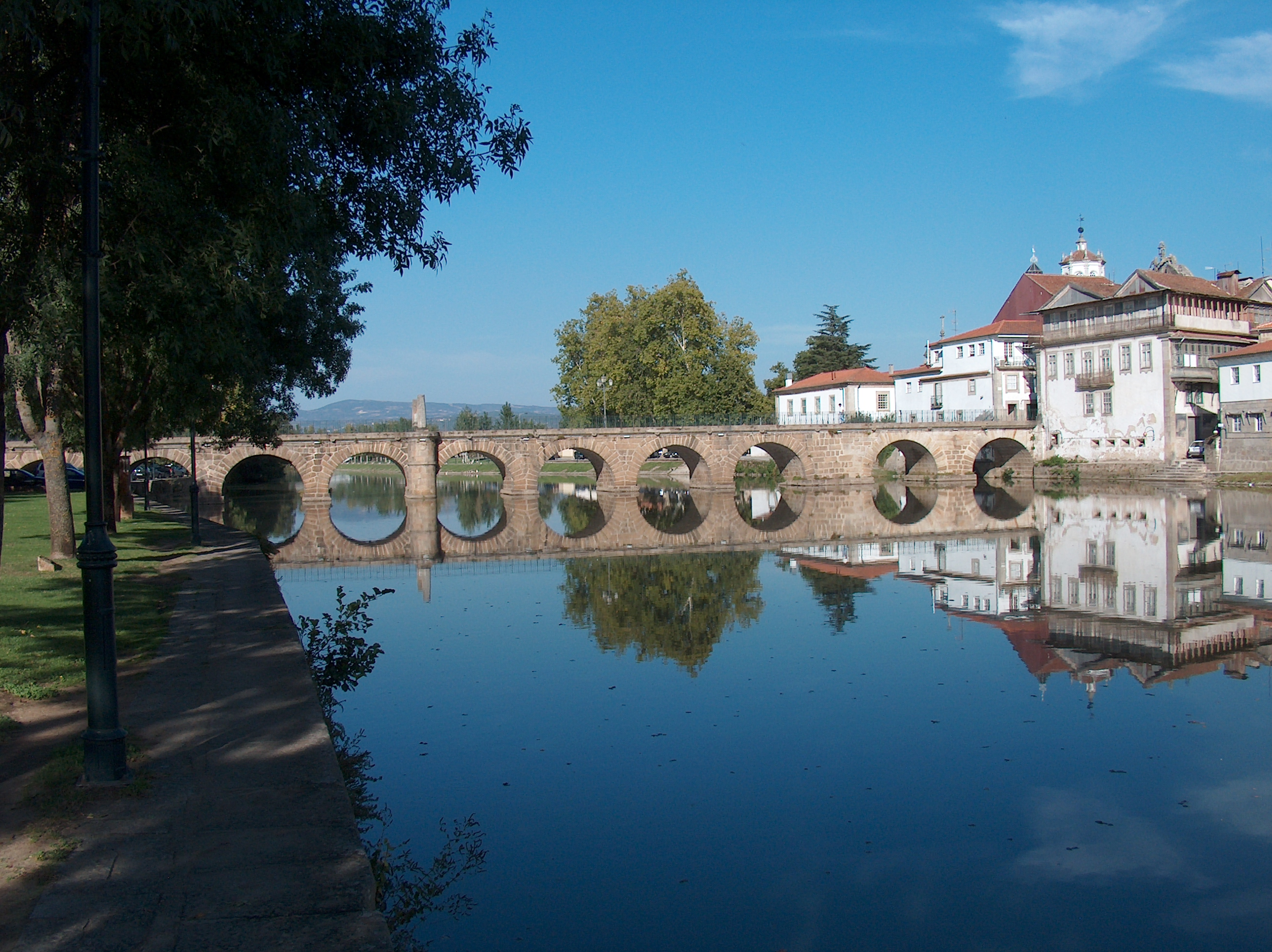
The emblematic symbol of Chaves, the historic Roman bridge of Emperor Trajan

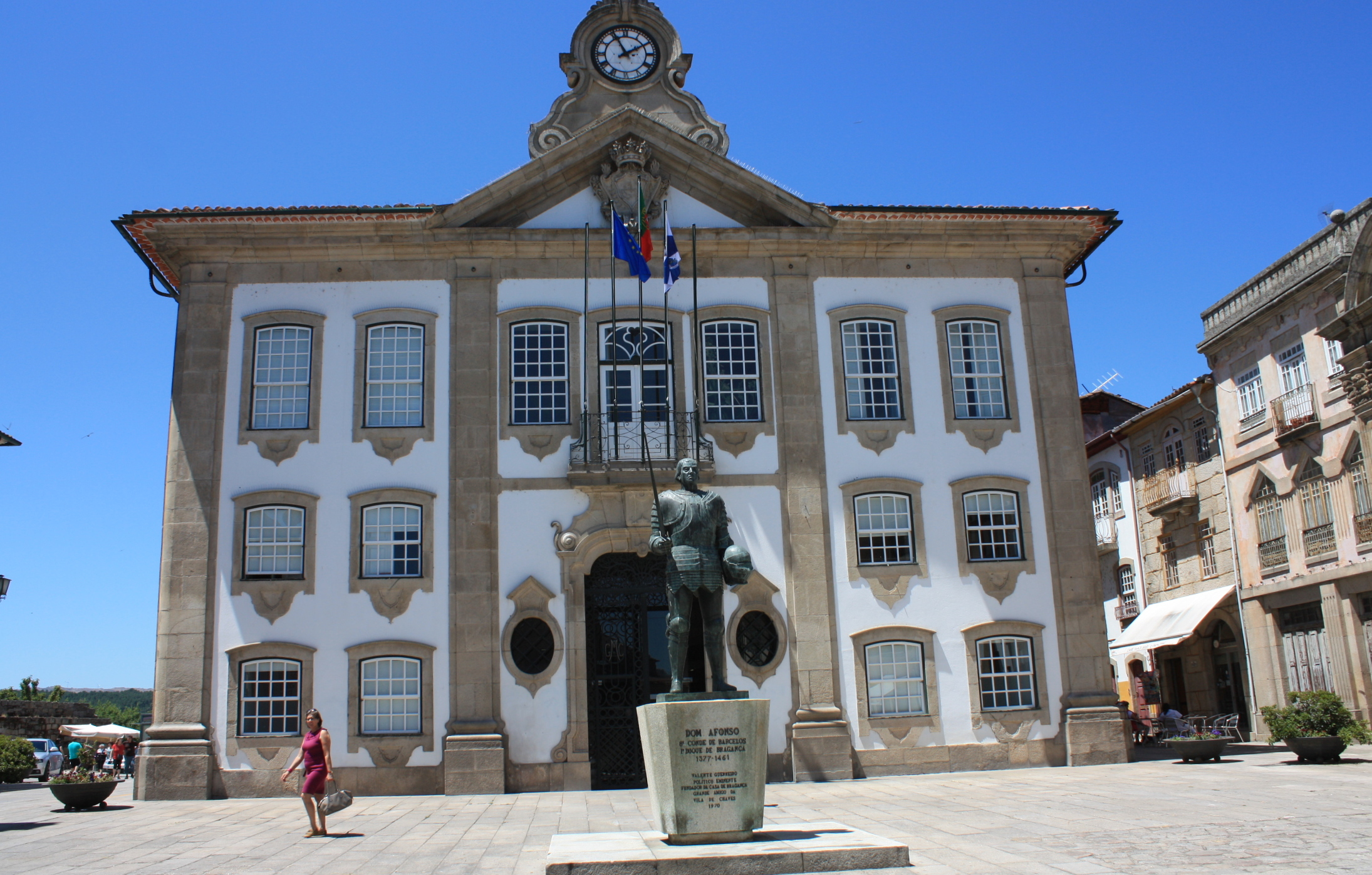
The former residence of the Majorat of Vilar de Perdizes, now the municipal palace/hall of Chaves

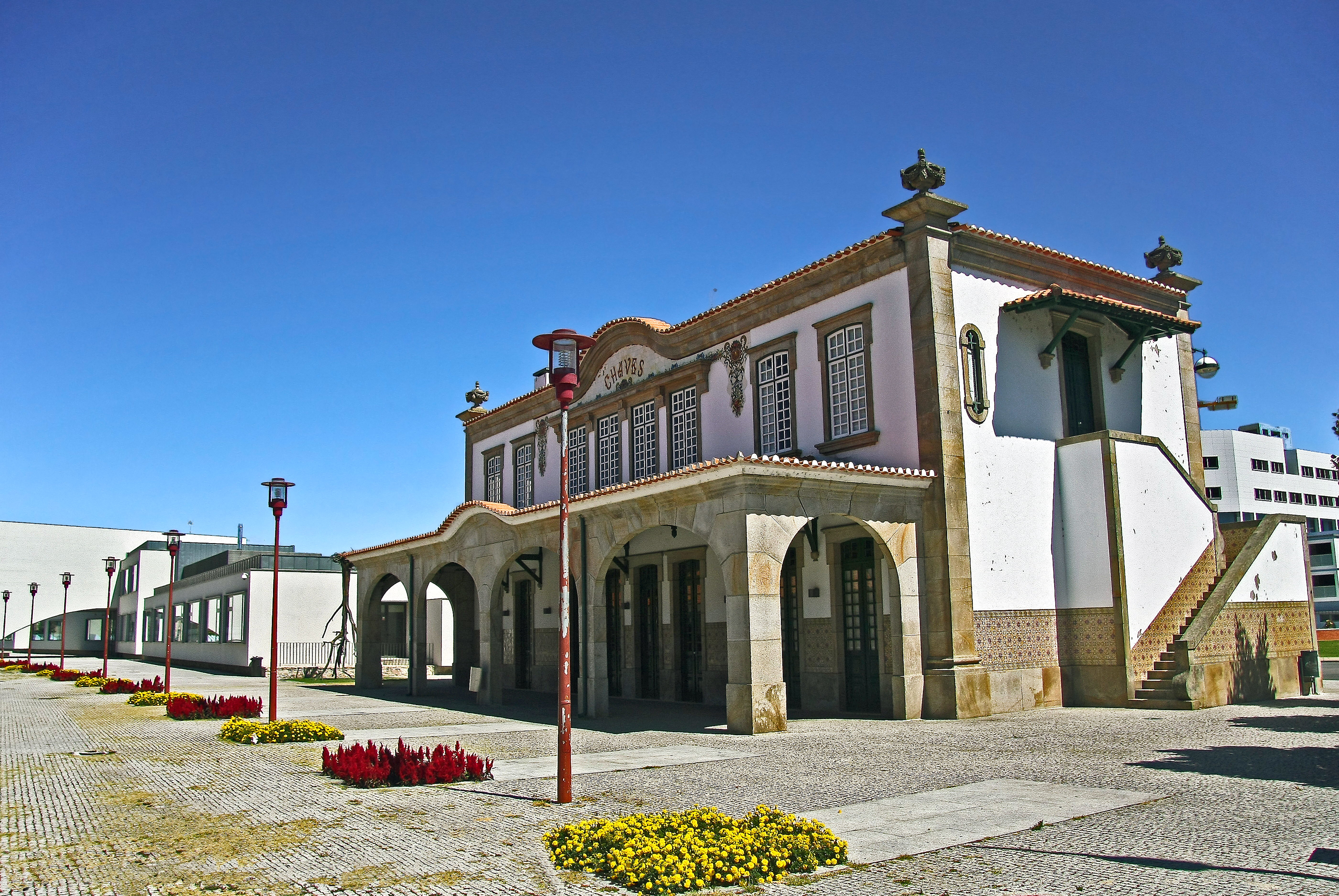
Railway Station of Chaves

- Agrarian School of Alves Teixeira (Portuguese: Escola Agrária Móvel Alves Teixeira/Escola Agrícola de Vidago/Centro de Formação Técnico Profissional Agrária Alves Teixeira)
- Agricultural Cooperative of Chaves (Portuguese: Edifício da Adega Cooperativa de Chaves/Cooperativa Agrícola de Chaves)
- Agricultural School of Chaves (Portuguese: Escola Agrícola, de Artes e Ofícios/Escola Agrícola de Chaves)
- Bridge of Arco (Portuguese: Ponte do Arco)
- Bridge of Erdevedo (Portuguese: Ponte em Ervededo)
- Bridge of Guilherme (Portuguese: Ponte Guilherme)
- Bridge of Meirinho (Portuguese: Ponte do Meirinho)
- Bridge of Missa (Portuguese: Ponte da Missa)
- Bridge of Ribela (Portuguese: Ponte das Caldas/Ponte do Ribelas)
- Bridge of Oura (Portuguese: Ponte de Oura)
- Bridge of Santiago (Portuguese: Ponte de Santiago)
- Bridge of Trajan (Portuguese: Ponte de Trajano), a symbol of Chaves, the bridge was constructed during the reign of Emperors Vespasian and Trajan to span the Tâmega River and connect the Roman provincial towns of Astorga and Bracara Augusta, identifiable by columns, that identify the bridge and its dedication to Emperor;
- Caixa Geral de Depósitos (Portuguese: Edifício da Caixa Geral de Depósitos, CGD, de Chaves)
- Cine-Theatre of Chaves (Portuguese: Cine-Teatro de Chaves)
- Estate of Macieira em Casas Novas (Portuguese: Quinta da Macieira em Casas Novas)
- Forest Administration of Chaves (Portuguese: Edifício da Administração Florestal de Chaves)
- Frontier Station of Vila Verde da Raia (Portuguese: Estação Fronteiriça de Vila Verde da Raia)
- Fountain of Águas da Facha (Portuguese: Fonte das Águas da Facha)
- Fountain of Casa dos Montes (Portuguese: Fonte Velha em Casas dos Montes)
- Fountain of Castelões (Portuguese: Fonte de Mergulho de Castelões)
- Fountain of Couto (Portuguese: Fonte de Mergulho no Lugar do Couto)
- Fountain of Cruzeiro (Portuguese: Fonte do Cruzeiro)
- Fountain of Curalha (Portuguese: Fonte Nova da Curalha)
- Fountain of Lagoinha (Portuguese: Fonte da Lagoinha)
- Fountain of Mina (Portuguese: Fonte e Tanque da Mina)
- Fountain of Olmo (Portuguese: Fonte do Largo do Olmo)
- Fountain of Povo de Castelões (Portuguese: Forno do Povo de Castelões)
- Fountain of Quinta de Humberto Teixeira (Portuguese: Fonte da Quinta de Humberto Teixeira)
- Fountain of Santo António de Monforte (Portuguese: Fonte de Mergulho de Santo António de Monforte)
- Fountain of Santa Marinha (Portuguese: Fonte de Santa Marinha)
- Fountain of Vila Frade (Portuguese: Fontes de Vila de Frade)
- Hospital of the Santa Casa da Misericóridia (Portuguese: Hospital da Santa Casa da Misericórdia de Chaves/Lar da Santa Casa da Misericórdia de Chaves)
- Hospital of São João de Deus (Portuguese: Hospital Real e Igreja de São João de Deus), also known as the Church of Madalena, this 18th-century building was built during the reign of King John VI (his coat-of-arms appears on the main door), as a chapel and military hospital, but includes many Neoclassic and Baroque elements (including a high facade).
- Hotel-Palace of Vidago (Portuguese: Hotel Palace em Vidago)
- Kiln of Povo de Castelões (Portuguese: Forno do Povo de Castelões)
- Markers of Ervededo (Portuguese: Marcos do Couto de Ervededo)
- Manorhouse of Azeredo (Portuguese: Solar dos Azeredo em Oura)
- Manorhouse of the Braganzas (Portuguese: Solar no Largo do Eirão/Solar dos Braganças)
- Manorhouse of the Machados (Portuguese: Solar dos Machados)
- Manorhouse of the Montalvões (Portuguese: Solar dos Montalvões)
- Manorhouse of the Viscounts of Rosário (Portuguese: Solar dos Viscondes do Rosário/Solar do Conde de Penamacor/Hotel Rural de Casas Novas)
- Municipal Council of Chaves (Portuguese: Casa do Morgado de Vilar de Perdizes/Câmara Municipal de Chaves)
- Municipal Council of Ervededo (Portuguese: Câmara Municipal e Cadeia de Torre de Ervededo/Associação Cultural e Recreativa da Torre de Ervededo)
- Municipal Stadium Eng. Manuel Branco Teixeira (Portuguese: Estádio Municipal Eng. Manuel Branco Teixeira)
- Palace of the Dukes of Braganza (Portuguese: Quartel da Guarda Principal/Paços dos Duques de Bragança/Museu Flaviense/Repartição de Finanças de Chaves)
- Pillory of Chaves (Portuguese: Pelourinho de Chaves)
- Pillory of Erdevedo (Portuguese: Pelourinho de Ervededo)
- Pillory of Monforte (Portuguese: Pelourinho de Monforte de Rio Livre)
- Poldrado da Curalha
- Pombal de Vila de Frade
- Primary School Count Ferreira Chaves (Portuguese: Escola Conde Ferreira de Chaves/Centro Social e Paroquial de Chaves)
- Primary School of Águas Ferias (Portuguese: Escola Primária e cantina escolar de Águas Frias/Escola Alfredo e Teresa Soares e Cantina Matilde Soares Mesquita/Escola Básica do 1.º Ciclo de Águas Frias)
- Primary School of Casas dos Montes (Portuguese: Escola Primária de Casas dos Montes/Jardim de Infância de Casa dos Montes)
- Primary School of Casas Novas (Portuguese: Escola Primária de Casas Novas/Centro de Convívio de Casas Novas)
- Primary School of Faiões (Portuguese: Escola Primária de Faiões/Escola Básica do 1.º Ciclo e Jardim de Infância de Faiões)
- Primary School of Loivos (Portuguese: Escola Primária de Loivos)
- Primary School of Outeiro Jusão (Portuguese: Escola Primária de Outeiro Jusão)
- Primary School of Outeiro Seco (Portuguese: Escola Primária de Outeiro Seco)
- Primary School of Santo António de Monforte (Portuguese: Escola Primária de Santo António de Monforte)
- Primary School of São Estêvão (Portuguese: Escola Primária de Santo Estêvão/Escola Básica do 1.º Ciclo de Santo Estêvão)
- Primary School of São Lourenço (Portuguese: Escola Primária de São Lourenço/Jardim de Infância de São Lourenço)
- Primary School of Selhariz (Portuguese: Escola Primária de Selhariz)
- Primary School of Vilar de Nantes (Portuguese: Escola Primária de Vilar de Nantes)
- Primary School of Vilarinho de Paranheiros (Portuguese: Escola Primária de Vilarinho de Paranheiros)
- Primary School of Vilela do Tâmega (Portuguese: Escola Primária de Vilela do Tâmega/Centro de Convívio e Lavandaria Social de Vilela do Tâmega)
- Railway Bridge of Tâmega (Portuguese: Ponte Ferroviária do Tâmega)
- Railway Station of Chaves (Portuguese: Estação Ferroviária de Chaves)
- Railway Station of Tâmega (Portuguese: Estação Ferroviária de Tâmega)
- Railway Station of Vidago (Portuguese: Estação Ferroviária do Vidago)
- Residence of Abade de Baçal (Portuguese: Casa na Rua do Abade de Baçal/Casa Onde Viveu o Abade de Baçal)
- Residence of Bastos (Portuguese: Casa e Capela da família Bastos em Oura)
- Residence of Meio do Povo (Portuguese: Casa do Meio do Povo)
- Residence of Quinta da Mata (Portuguese: Casa da Quinta da Mata)
- Residence of Vilar de Nantes (Portuguese: Casa em Vilar de Nantes com Pinturas no Interior)
- Roman Thermal Spa of Chaves (Portuguese: Termas Medicinais Romanas de Chaves)
- Secondary School Dr. Júlio Dinis (Portuguese: Escola Comercial e Industrial de Chaves/Escola Secundária Dr. Júlio Dinis)
- Watermills of Curalha (Portuguese: Moinho de Água da Curalha)

=== Military ===
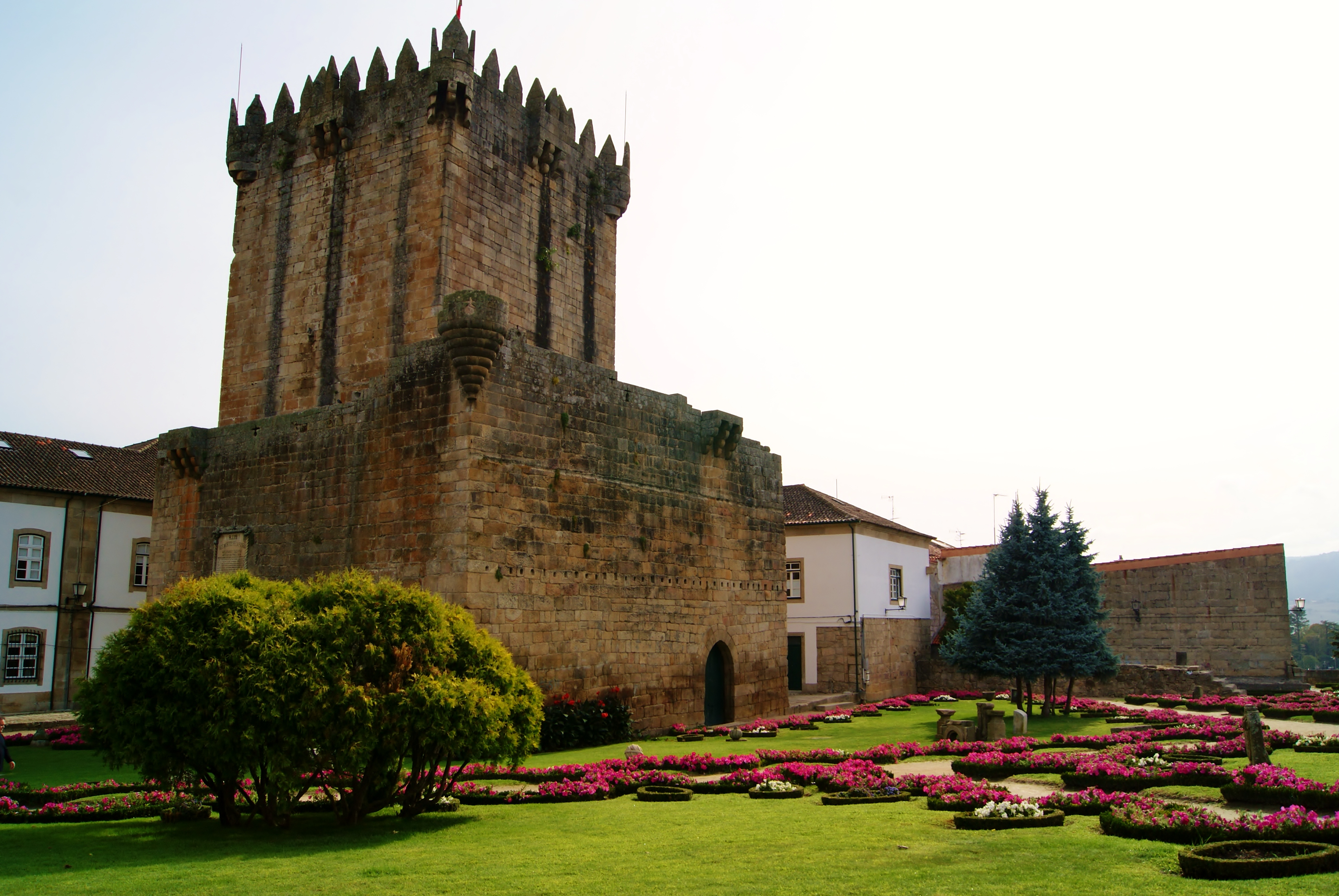
The former Keep Tower of Chaves, principal remnant of the castle and fortifications of medieval Chaves

- Castle of Chaves (Portuguese: Castelo de Chaves e restos da fortificação abaluartada na cidade), classified as a Monumento Nacional since 22 March 1938, the 14th century castle was constructed in the reign of King D. Dinis, but today only the keep tower remains;
- Castle of Ervededo (Portuguese: Castelo de Ervededo)
- Castle of Mau Vizinho (Portuguese: Castelo do Mau Vizinho/Castelo dos Mouros)
- Castle of Monforte de Rio Livre (Portuguese: Castelo de Monforte/Castelo de Monforte de Rio Livre/Castelo e cerca urbana de Monforte)
- Castle of Santo Estêvão (Portuguese: Castelo de Santo Estêvão)
- Fort of São Francisco (Portuguese: Forte de São Francisco), plans for a hill fort had persisted since the Middle Ages, but this fort was only constructed following the Portuguese Restoration War, and saw service during the Napoleonic Invasion and Liberal Wars;
- Fort of São Neutel (Portuguese: Forte de São Neutel), built on a northern hill for a perceived possible Spanish invasion, during the Portuguese Restoration War, the fort was connected to the defensive line of Chaves.

=== Religious ===
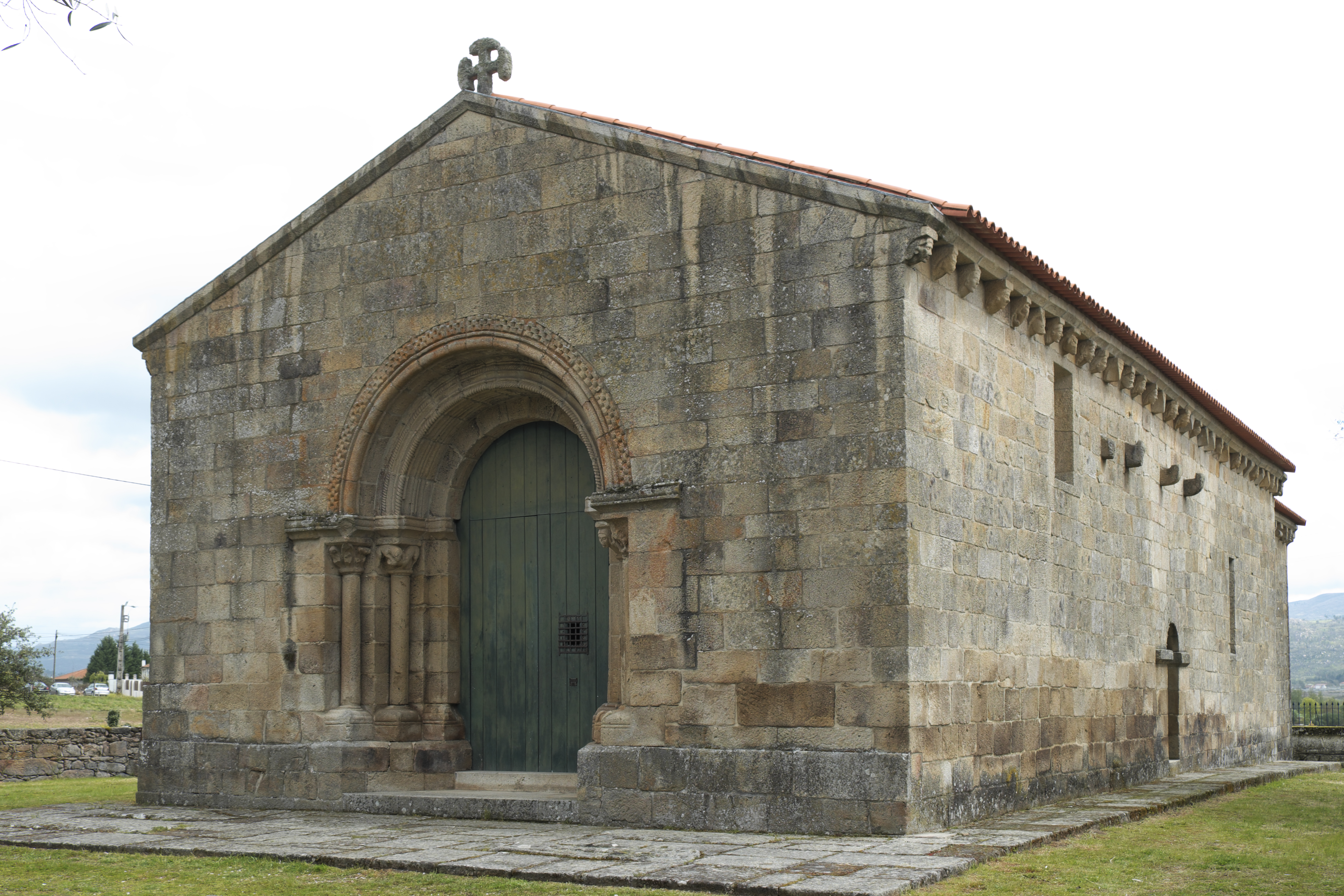
The Romanesque facade of the Church of Nossa Senhora da Azinheira

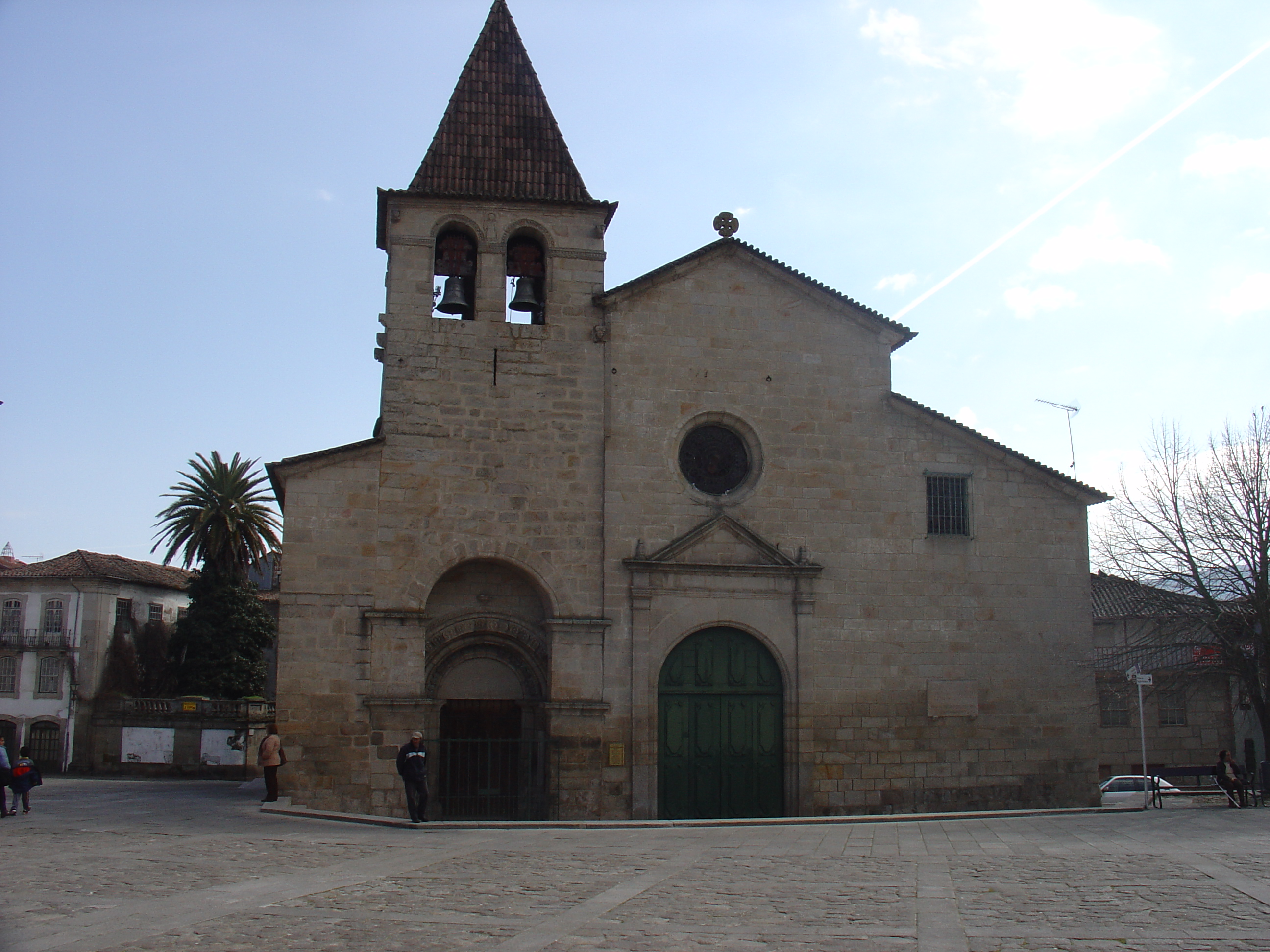
The front facade of the parochial Church of Santa Maria Maior, former cathedral dating to the 11th century

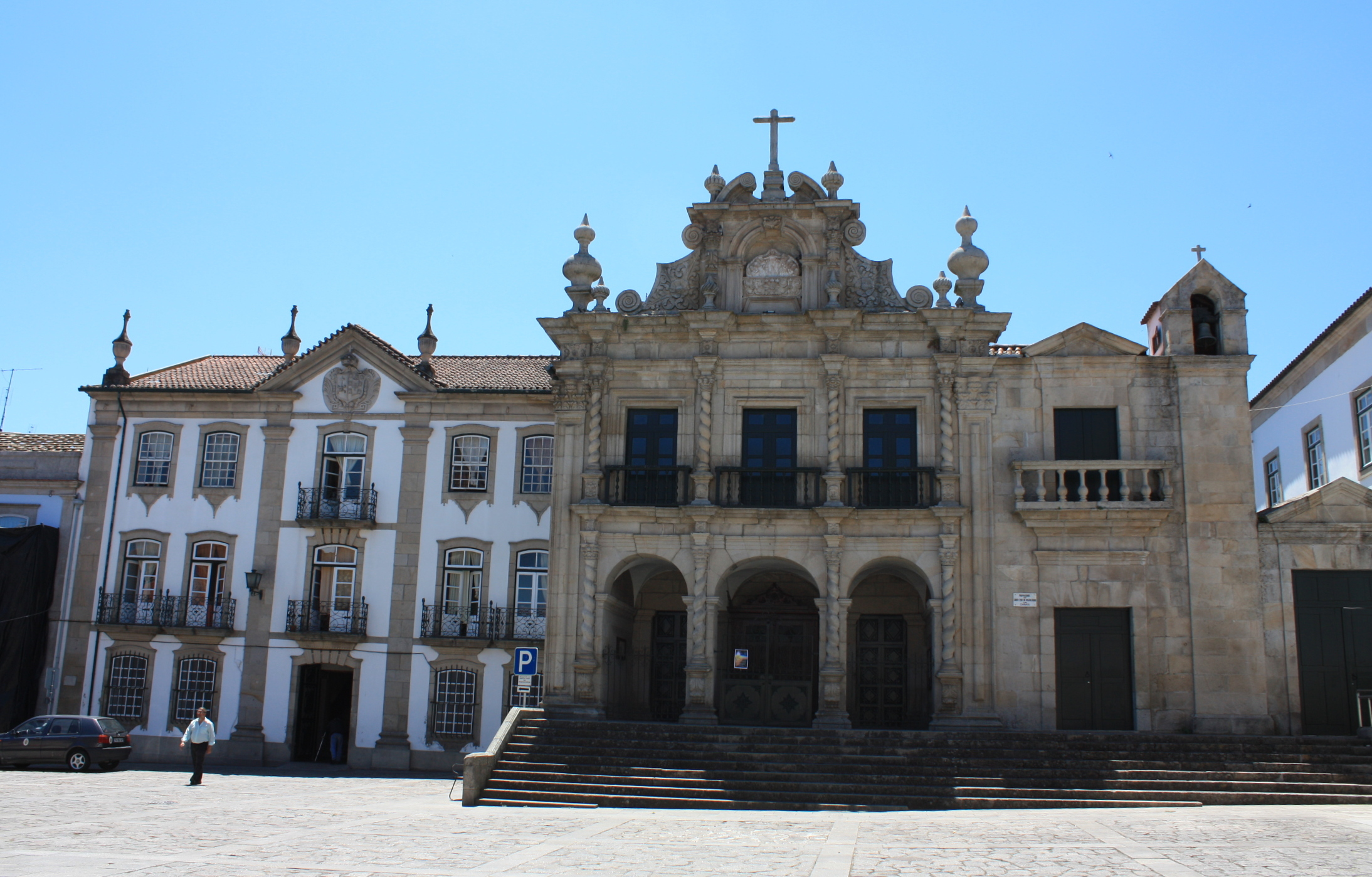
The Church of the Misercórdia, built in the 17th century, is the dynastic resting place for some members of the House of Braganza

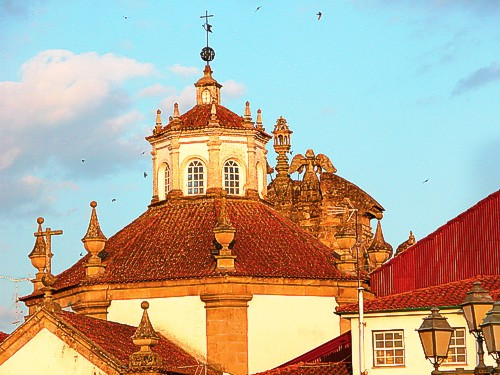
The ornate rooftop of the Baroque-influence Church of São João de Deus, commonly known as the Church of Madalena

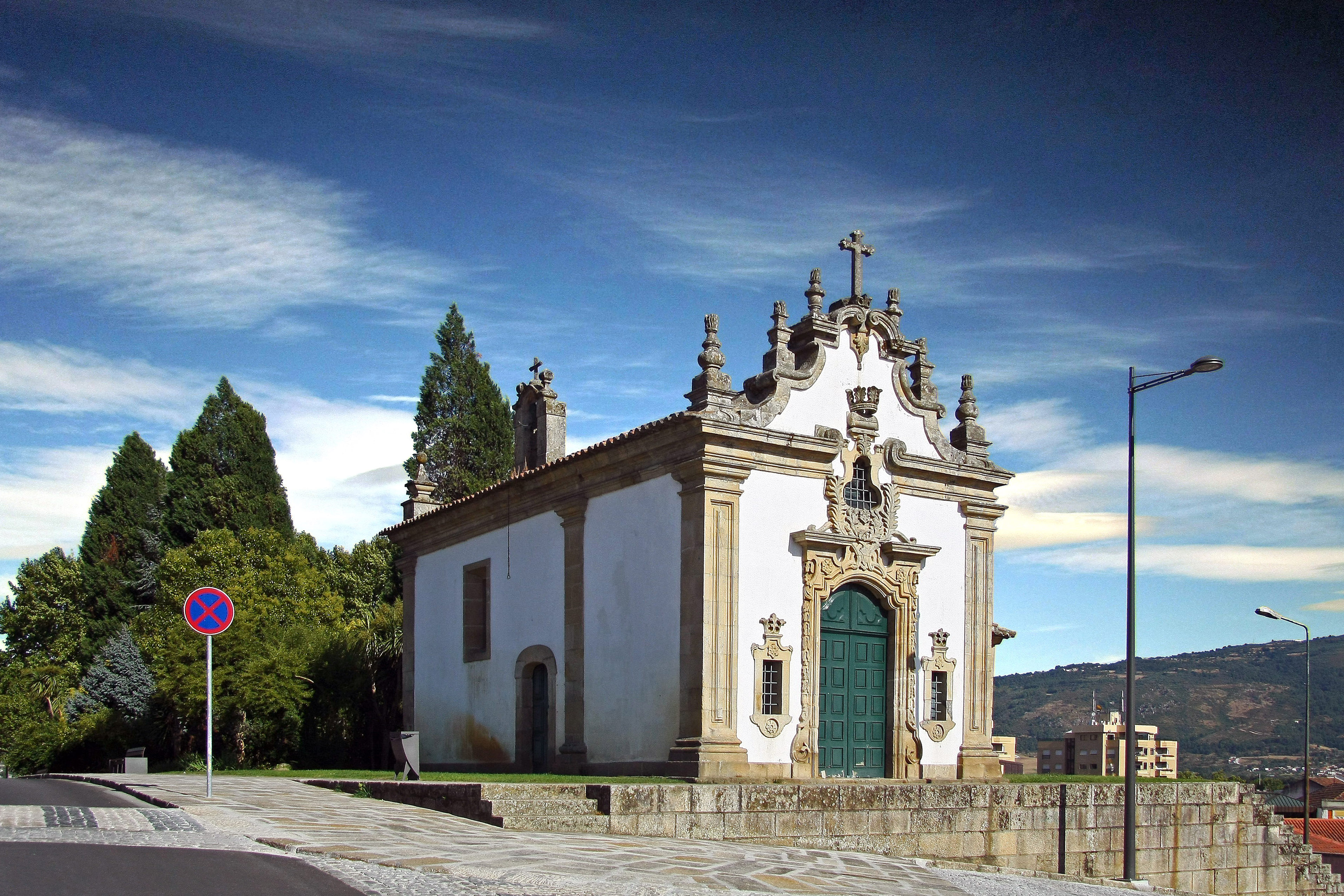
Chapel of Nossa Senhora da Lapa

In addition to the old Church of São Francisco (which for three centuries was resting place of the first Duke of Braganza), there are other buildings which have been artistically converted into hotel rooms, and which served the army as barracks for many years.

- Chapel of Espírito Santo (Portuguese: Capela do Espírito Santo)
- Chapel of Granjinha (Portuguese: Capela da Granjinha)
- Chapel of Nossa Senhora das Brotas (Portuguese: Capela de Nossa Senhora das Brotas)
- Chapel of Nossa Senhora da Conceição (Portuguese: Capela de Nossa Senhora da Conceição)
- Chapel of Nossa Senhora das Dores (Portuguese: Capela de Nossa Senhora das Dores)
- Chapel of Nossa Senhora da Encarnação (Portuguese: Capela de Nossa Senhora da Encarnação)
- Chapel of Nossa Senhora da Lapa (Portuguese: Capela de Nossa Senhora da Lapa)
- Chapel of Nossa Senhora do Loreto (Portuguese: Capela de Nossa Senhora do Loreto/Capela de Santa Cabeça)
- Chapel of Nossa Senhora da Penha (Portuguese: Capela de Nossa Senhora da Penha)
- Chapel of Nossa Senhora da Piedade (Portuguese: Capela de Nossa Senhora da Piedade)
- Chapel of Nossa Senhora do Pópulo (Portuguese: Capela de Nossa Senhora do Pópulo)
- Chapel of Nossa Senhora do Rosário (Portuguese: Capela de Nossa Senhora do Rosário)
- Chapel of Nossa Senhora do Rosário de Sanjurg(Portuguese: Capela de Nossa Senhora do Rosário)
- Chapel of Pai Mogo (Portuguese: Capela de Tariz/Capela de Pai Mogo)
- Chapel of Santa Catarina (Portuguese: Capela de Santa Catarina)
- Chapel of Santa Marinha (Portuguese: Capela de Santa Marinha)
- Chapel of Santa Marta (Portuguese: Capela de Santa Marta)
- Chapel of Santo António (Portuguese: Capela de Santo António)
- Chapel of Santiago (Portuguese: Capela de Santiago)
- Chapel of São Bartolomeu (Portuguese: Capela de São Bartolomeu)
- Chapel of São Bento (Portuguese: Capela de São Bento)
- Chapel of São Bernardino (Portuguese: Capela de São Bernardino)
- Chapel of São Geraldo (Portuguese: Capela de São Geraldo)
- Chapel of São João Baptista (Portuguese: Capela de São João Baptista)
- Chapel of São Martinho (Portuguese: Capela de São Martinho)
- Chapel of São Miguel (Portuguese: Capela de São Miguel)
- Chapel of São Nicolau (Portuguese: Capela de São Nicolau)
- Chapel of São Roque (Portuguese: Capela de São Roque)
- Chapel of São Sebastião (Portuguese: Capela de São Sebastião)
- Chapel of São Simão (Portuguese: Capela do Olmo/Capela de São Simão)
- Chapel of São Tiago (Portuguese: Capela de São Tiago)
- Chapel of Senhor dos Aflitos (Portuguese: Capela do Senhor dos Aflitos)
- Chapel of Senhor do Bom Caminho (Portuguese: Capela do Senhor do Bom Caminho)
- Chapel of Senhor do Calvário (Portuguese: Capela do Senhor do Calvário)
- Chapel of Senhor dos Desamparados (Portuguese: Capela do Senhor dos Desamparados)
- Chapel of Senhor dos Passos (Portuguese: Passos da Via Sacra de Chaves/Capela do Senhor dos Passos)
- Chapel of Senhora de Livração (Portuguese: Capela da Senhora da Livração)
- Chapel of Senhora de Portela (Portuguese: Capela da Senhora da Portela)
- Church of Castelões (Portuguese: Igreja Paroquial de Castelões)
- Church of the Divino Salvador (Portuguese: Igreja Paroquial de Vilar de Nantes/Igreja do Divino Salvador)
- Church of Nossa Senhora da Assunção (Portuguese: Igreja Paroquial de Eiras/Igreja de Nossa Senhora da Assunção)
- Church of Nossa Senhora da Assunção (Portuguese: Igreja Paroquial de Vilela do Tâmega/Igreja de Nossa Senhora da Assunção)
- Church of Nossa Senhora da Azinheira (Portuguese: Igreja de Nossa Senhora da Azinheira)
- Church of Nossa Senhora da Conceição (Portuguese: Igreja Paroquial de Lama de Arcos/Igreja de Nossa Senhora da Conceição)
- Church of Nossa Senhora da Conceição (Portuguese: Igreja Paroquial de Vidago/Igreja de Nossa Senhora da Conceição)
- Church of Nossa Senhora da Expectações (Portuguese: Igreja Paroquial de Mairos/Igreja de Nossa Senhora da Expectação)
- Church of Nossa Senhora da Expectações (Portuguese: Igreja Paroquial de Roriz/Igreja de Nossa Senhora da Expectação)
- Church of Nossa Senhora da Natividade (Portuguese: Igreja Paroquial de São Vicente/Igreja de Nossa Senhora da Natividade)
- Church of Nossa Senhora das Neves (Portuguese: Igreja Paroquial de Cela/Igreja de Nossa Senhora das Neves)
- Church of Nossa Senhora das Neves (Portuguese: Igreja Paroquial de Paradela de Monforte/Igreja de Nossa Senhora das Neves)
- Church of Nossa Senhora das Neves (Portuguese: Igreja Paroquial de Vila Verde da Raia/Igreja de Nossa Senhora das Neves)
- Church of the Sagrada Família (Portuguese: Igreja Paroquial de Santa Cruz e Trindade/Igreja da Sagrada Família)
- Church of the Santa Casa da Misericórida (Portuguese: Igreja e Provedoria da Santa Casa da Misericórdia de Chaves), this 17th-century Baroque church, was the main chapel of the Dukes of Bragança, that included four Greek columns and mythological sculptures, surmounted by an image of Nossa Senhora da Misericórdia (Portuguese: Our Lady of Mercy), while the interior was covered in 18th century blue-and-white azulejo that depicted biblical scenes, while the wooden ceiling has a scene of the Visitation, painted by Jerónimo Rocha Braga (1743).
- Church of Santo André (Portuguese: Igreja Paroquial da Curalha/Igreja de Santo André)
- Church of Santo André (Portuguese: Igreja Paroquial de Oucidres/Igreja de Santo André)
- Church of Santo António (Portuguese: Igreja Paroquial de Curral de Vacas/Igreja Paroquial de Santo António de Monforte/Igreja de Santo António)
- Church of Santo António (Portuguese: Igreja Paroquial de Soutelinho da Raia/Igreja de Santo António)
- Church of Santa Clara (Portuguese: Igreja Paroquial de Sanjurge/Igreja de Santa Clara)
- Church of Santo Estêvão (Portuguese: Igreja Paroquial de Santo Estêvão/Igreja de Santo Estêvão)
- Church of Santa Eulália (Portuguese: Igreja Paroquial de Anelhe/Igreja de Santa Eulália)
- Church of Santa Leocádia (Portuguese: Igreja Paroquial de Santa Leocádia/Igreja de Santa Leocádia)
- Church of Santa Luzia (Portuguese: Igreja Paroquial de Santa Luzia / Capela Espanhola)
- Church of Santa Maria (Portuguese: Igreja Paroquial de Calvão/Igreja de Santa Maria)
- Church of Santa Maria (Portuguese: Igreja Paroquial de Moreiras/Igreja de Santa Maria)
- Church of Santa Maria (Portuguese: Igreja Paroquial de Soutelo/Igreja de Santa Maria)
- Church of Santa Maria Maior (Portuguese: Igreja Paroquial de Chaves/Igreja de Santa Maria Maior), the 12th century Romanesque parochial church and former-cathedral (decommissioned when the bishopric was moved to Vila Real and abandoned after 716 A.D. during the Moorish invasion), was renovated in the 16th century, but the three nave church conserves many of the sturdy solid granite features and austere facade on the exterior and interior (such as the cylindrical columns supporting eight arches, a stone-ribbed dome covering the main chapel, stained glass and an unpainted oak ceiling).
- Church of Santa Marta (Portuguese: Igreja Paroquial de Calvão/Igreja de Santa Maria)
- Church of Santa Marta (Portuguese: Igreja Paroquial de Vila de Frade/Igreja de Santa Marta)
- Church of Santiago (Portuguese: Igreja Paroquial de Oura/Igreja de Santiago)
- Church of São Bartolomeu (Portuguese: Igreja Paroquial de Póvoa de Agrações/Igreja de São Bartolomeu)
- Church of São Bartolomeu (Portuguese: Igreja Paroquial de Travancas/Igreja de São Bartolomeu)
- Church of São Francisco (Portuguese: Igreja Paroquial de Vilarinho de Paranheiras/Igreja de São Francisco)
- Church of São Gonçalo (Portuguese: Igreja Paroquial de Vilas Boas/Igreja de São Gonçalo)
- Church of São Geraldo (Portuguese: Igreja Paroquial de Loivos/Igreja de Santa Bárbara/Igreja de São Geraldo)
- Church of São João Baptista (Portuguese: Igreja Paroquial de Cimo de Vila de Castanheira/Igreja de São João Baptista)
- Church of São Julião (Portuguese: Igreja Paroquial de São Julião de Montenegro/Igreja de São Julião)
- Church of São Martinho (Portuguese: Igreja Paroquial de Ervededo/Igreja de São Martinho)
- Church of São Miguel (Portuguese: Igreja Paroquial de Nogueira da Montanha/Igreja de São Miguel)* Church of São Pedro (Portuguese: Igreja Paroquial de Águas Frias/Igreja de São Pedro)
- Church of São Pedro de Sanfins (Portuguese: Igreja Paroquial de São Pedro de Sanfins)
- Church of São Tiago (Portuguese: Igreja Paroquial de Seara Velha/Igreja de São Tiago)
- Church of São Tiago (Portuguese: Igreja Paroquial de Tronco/Igreja de São Tiago)
- Church of São Tiago (Portuguese: Igreja Paroquial de Vilarelho da Raia/Igreja de São Tiago)
- Church of São Tomé (Portuguese: Igreja Paroquial de Arcossó/Igreja de São Tomé)
- Church of São Vicente (Portuguese: Igreja Paroquial de Redondelo/Igreja de São Vicente)
- Convent of São Francisco (Portuguese: Convento de São Francisco/Pousada de São Francisco)
- Cross of Calvão (Portuguese: Cruzeiro com Alminhas em Calvão)
- Cross of Eiras (Portuguese: Cruzeiro de Eiras)
- Cross of Lugar do Couto (Portuguese: Cruzeiro do Lugar do Couto)
- Cross of Nossa Senhora da Piedade (Portuguese: Cruzeiro de Nossa Senhora da Piedade)
- Cross of Outeiro Seco (Portuguese: Cruzeiro em Outeiro Seco)
- Cross of Sanjurge (Portuguese: Cruzeiro de Sanjurge)
- Cross of São Bento (Portuguese: Cruzeiro de São Bento)
- Cross of São Sebastião (Portuguese: Cruzeiro de São Sebastião)
- Cross of Senhora da Piedade (Portuguese: Cruzeiro do Senhor da Piedade, em Castelões)
- Cross of Senhora da Portela (Portuguese: Cruzeiro da Senhora da Portela)
- Cross of Vidago (Portuguese: Cruzeiro Alpendrado em Vidago)
- Cross of Vilela Seca (Portuguese: Cruzeiro do Cemitério de Vilela Seca)
- Monastery of Nossa Senhora da Conceição (Portuguese: Mosteiro de Nossa Senhora da Conceição/Liceu Fernão Magalhães/Liceu Nacional de Chaves/Escola Secundária Fernão de Magalhães)
- Sanctuary of Alto do Coto (Portuguese: Capela do Côto/Capela de Nossa Senhora da Saúde/Santuário do Alto do Côto)
- Sanctuary of Nossa Senhora da Aparecida (Portuguese: Capela de Nossa Senhora Aparecida/Santuário de Nossa Senhora da Aparecida), constructed on the site of an 1833 Marian apparition, when three shepherd children (similar to the events in Fátima, Portugal) witnessed the Virgin Mary.
- Sanctuary of São Caetano (Portuguese: Capela de São Caetano/Santuário de São Caetano), constructed in honour of Saint Cajetan (a Catholic Theatine orator from the Counter Reformation), it is the centre of annual (7 August) celebrations, when seven images of the saint are carried in religious processions.
- Sanctuary of Senhora de Engaranho (Portuguese: Capela da Senhora do Engaranho/Capela da Senhora das Necessidades/Santuário da Senhora do Engaranho), a sanctuary dedicated to an uncommon invocation to the image of Mary (responsible for aiding those with diseased-, crooked-/crossed-legs, or afflictions associated with walking, such as rickets), families with young children would visit the sanctuary and bathe their children in a carved granite stone with "miraculous waters". In addition to chapel to Our Lady of Necessities there are smaller chapels dedicated to St. Catejan, St. Blais and St. Benedict, and religious cross.

== Notable citizens ==
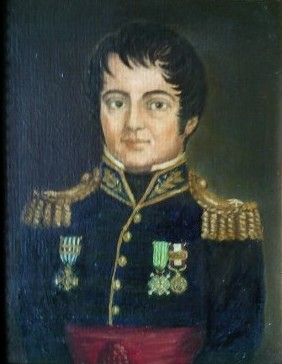
Ignácio Luis Madeira de Melo)

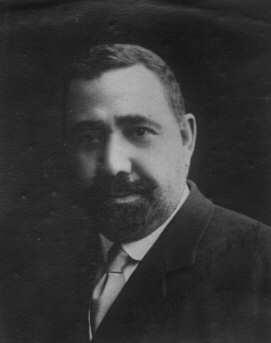
António Joaquim Granjo, (77th and 82nd) Prime Minister, assassinated during the Noite Sangrenta, a native of Chaves

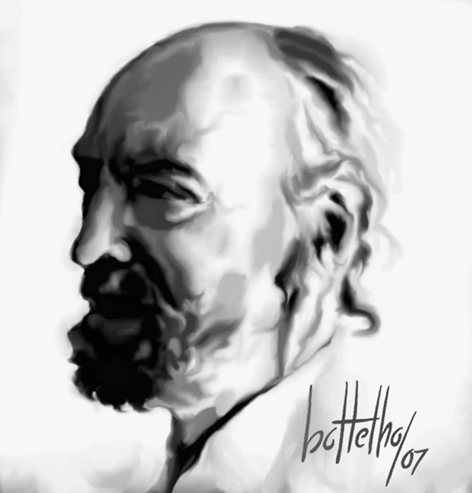
Nadir Afonso

- João Gonçalves da Costa, (PT Wiki) (1720–1820), an explorer and conquistador, he went to Brazil aged 16, conquering lands in the Sertão da Ressaca, (PT Wiki), fighting local native tribes, and founding the village of Vitória da Conquista, in the state of Bahia;
- Rodrigo de Sousa Coutinho, 1st Count of Linhares (1755–1812) a nobleman and politician.
- Inácio Luís Madeira de Melo (1775–1833) a military officer, served in the office of Governor of Arms, and led Portuguese troops based in Salvador, Bahia
- Agostinho de Sousa Pinto de Barros Cachapuz, (PT Wiki) (1786–1864), an officer during the Peninsular Wars and Liberal Wars, decorated for his defence of legitimist ideals;
- José Celestino da Silva (1849–1911) an Army officer, colonial administrator and governor of the colony of Portuguese Timor 1894-1908.
- Manuel Maria Coelho (1857–1943) a military officer during the Portuguese First Republic. He became Prime Minister in 1921 after the Noite Sangrenta (Bloody Night)
- António Granjo (1881 – Lisbon, 1921), a lawyer and politician, assassinated as Minister of the Interior, during the infamous Noite Sangrenta (Bloody Night);
- Fernando de Quintanilha e Mendonça Dias (1898-1992) member of the Portuguese Navy and a political and colonial administrator during the Estado Novo. Minister of the Navy from 1958 to 1968 and created the Hydrographic Institute.
- Francisco da Costa Gomes, ComTE, GOA (Chaves; 1914–Lisbon 2001) a military officer, politician, the 15th President of the Portuguese Republic (the second after the Carnation Revolution), known for his brokered military agreement in Portuguese West Africa, and his refusal to swear public loyalty to the President of the Council of Ministers Marcello Caetano;
- Gentil de Valadares, (PT Wiki) (1916–Alvor 2006), a poet, known as the poet traitor during the Estado Novo regime for his work Coração against the Colonial Wars, and imprisoned by the PIDE (secret police);
- Mário Carneiro, (PT Wiki) (1917– 2008), a surgeon and director of the Caldas de Chaves; promoted a modern thermal park system in the Alto Tâmega region, that includes the Chaves spa;
- Nadir Afonso, GOSE (1920–2013) a geometric abstractionist painter, formally trained in architecture, became a pioneer in the Kinetic art movement;
- António Marto (born 1947) a prelate of the Catholic Church, Bishop of Leiria-Fátima from 2006 to 2022, became a cardinal in 2018.
- Fernando Pereira (1950–1985), freelance photographer and Greenpeace activist, killed when French intelligence (DGSE) detonated a bomb and sank the Rainbow Warrior ship.

=== Sport ===
- Carlos Manuel Pereira Pinto (born 1960) known as Adão, is a Portuguese former footballer with 410 club caps and 11 for Portugal
- Fernando Aguiar (born 1972) a Canadian former soccer player with 395 club caps and 13 for Canada
- Vítor Castanheira (born 1977) a retired footballer with 351 club caps
- João Alves (born 1980) a retired footballer with 361 club caps and 3 for Portugal
- João Fernandes (born 1983) a footballer with about 350 club caps.

== See also ==
- Aquæ Flaviæ
- Chaves IPR
