= Ribeira de Pena (Salvador) e Santo Aleixo de Além-Tâmega =

- Civil parish
- Location in Portugal
- Coordinates: 41.520°N 7.793°W
- Country: Portugal
- Region: Norte
- Intermunic. comm.: Alto Tâmega
- District: Vila Real
- Municipality: Ribeira de Pena

Area
  - Total: 52.85 km^{2} (20.41 sq mi)

Population (2011)
  - Total: 2,785
  - Density: 52.70/km^{2} (136.5/sq mi)
- Time zone: UTC+00:00 (WET)
  - Summer (DST): UTC+01:00 (WEST)

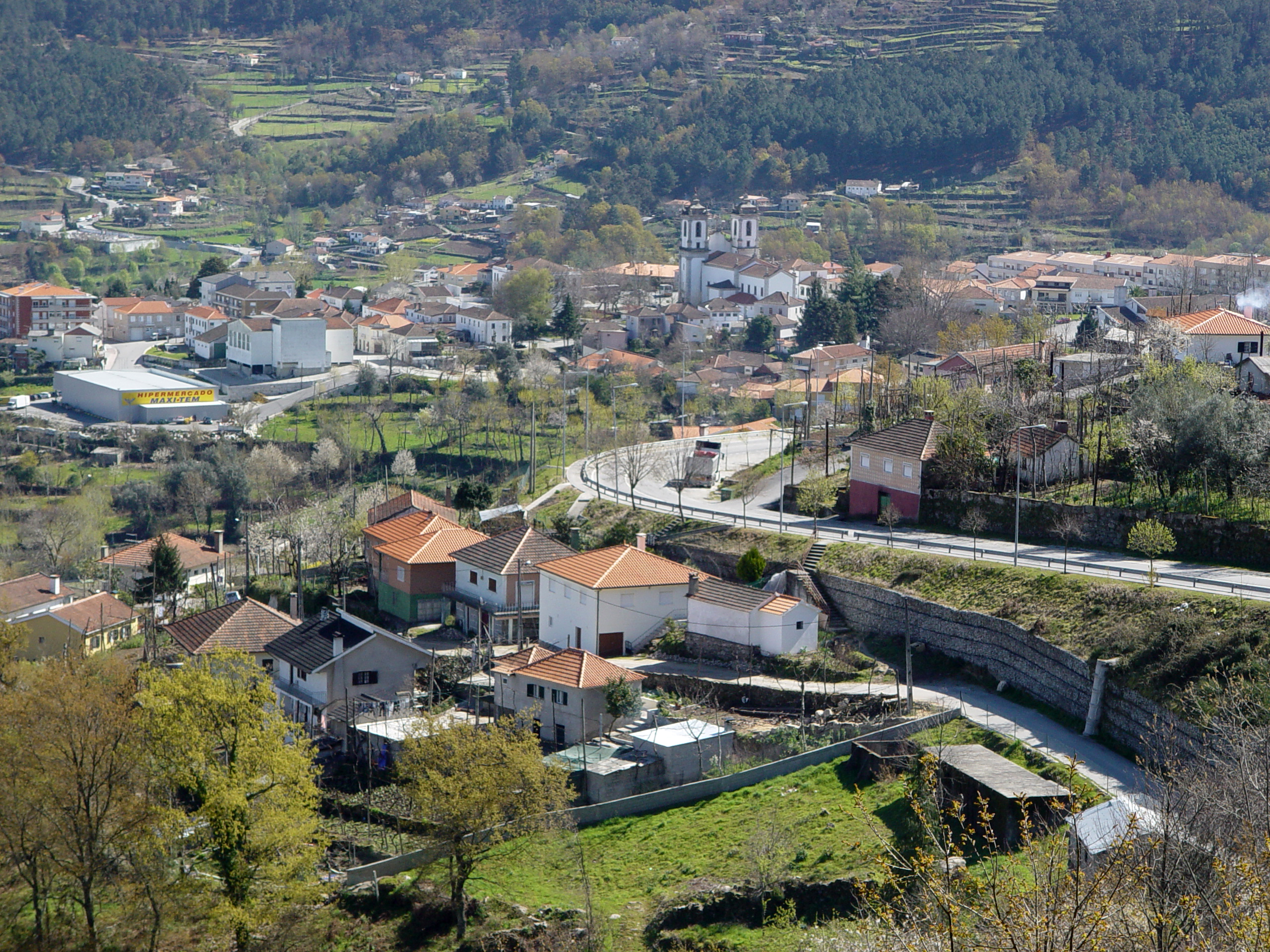
Urban center of the village of Ribeira da Pena

Ribeira de Pena (Salvador) e Santo Aleixo de Além-Tâmega is a civil parish in the municipality of Ribeira de Pena, Portugal. It was formed in 2013 by the merger of the former parishes Salvador and Santo Aleixo de Além-Tâmega. The population in 2011 was 2,785, in an area of 52.85 km^{2}.
