= Alto Tâmega Dam =

- Location within Portugal
- Official name: Barragem do Alto Tâmega
- Country: Portugal
- Location: municipalities Ribeira de Pena and Vila Pouca de Aguiar, Vila Real District
- Coordinates: 41°34′28.7″N 7°43′52″W
- Purpose: Power
- Status: Operational
- Opening date: 2024

Dam and spillways
- Type of dam: Concrete double curvature arch dam
- Impounds: Tâmega River
- Height: 106 m (348 ft)
- Length: 334 m (1,096 ft)

Power Station
- Installed capacity: 160 MW (210,000 hp)
- Annual generation: 139 GWh

Alto Tâmega Dam (Portuguese: Barragem do Alto Tâmega) is a concrete double curvature arch dam on the Tâmega River. It is located in the municipalities of Ribeira de Pena and Vila Pouca de Aguiar, in Vila Real District, Portugal.

It is part of the wider Tâmega Electricity-Generating Group formed of 3 dams and 3 plants

Iberdrola signed a 70-year concession with the Government of Portugal in July 2014 for the design, construction and operation of three projects: Alto Tâmega, Daivões and Gouvães dams.

Construction of the dam was completed in 2024.

== Dam ==
Alto Tâmega Dam is a 106.5 m tall and 334 long double-curvature concrete.

== Reservoir ==
The reservoir surface area for the dam has 7.4 km^{2}.

== Power plant ==
The generating unit of the dam consists of two 80MW turbine units with a maximum flow rate of 200 m^{3}/s producing 139GWh of electricity a year. The dam contains two lateral spillways with combined discharge capacity of 1,825 m^{3}/s, which protect the dam from over-topping.

== See also ==
- List of power stations in Portugal
- List of dams and reservoirs in Portugal
