= Daivões Dam =

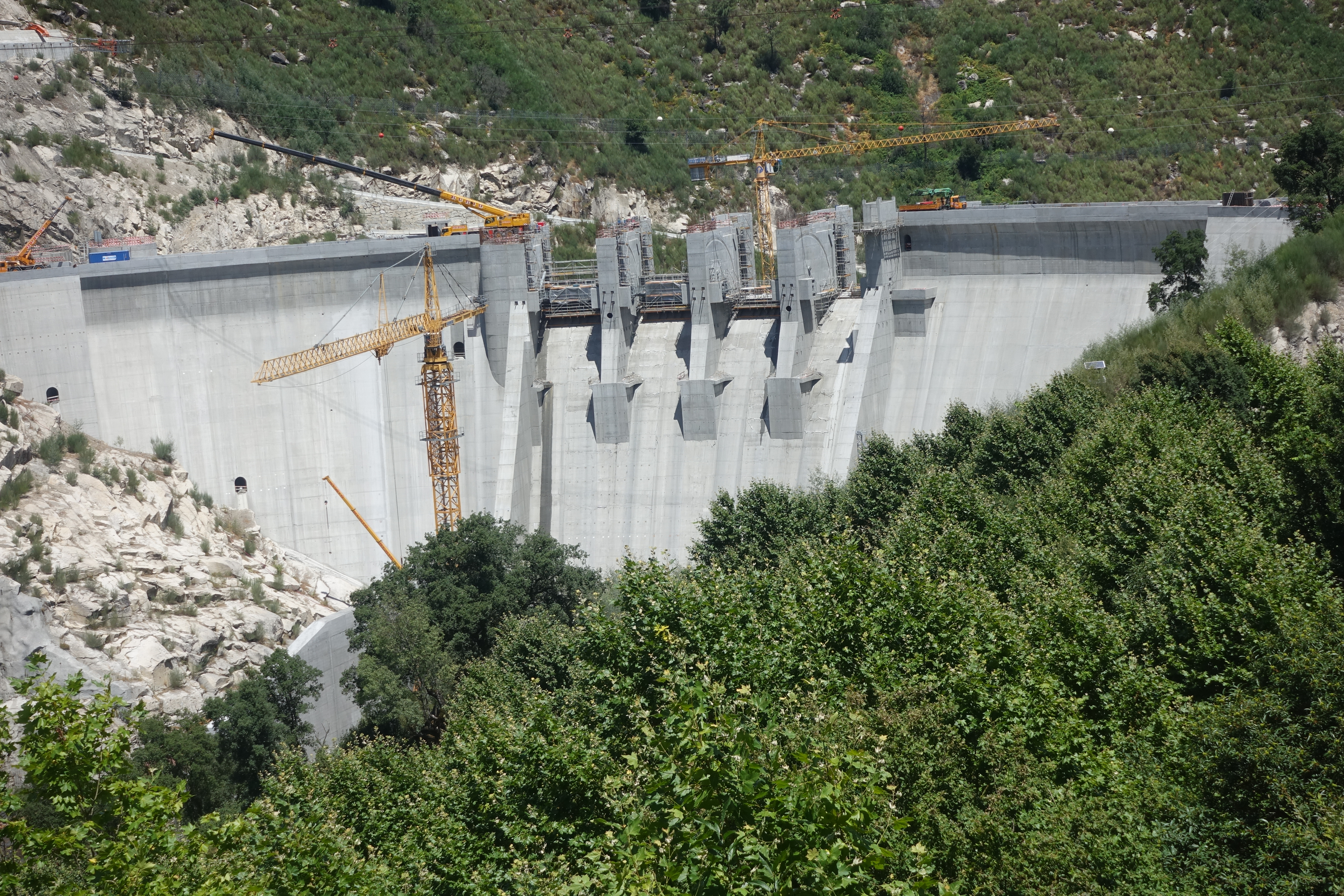

- Location within Portugal
- Official name: Barragem de Daivões
- Country: Portugal
- Location: municipalities Ribeira de Pena, Vila Real District, and Cabeceiras de Basto, Braga District
- Coordinates: 41°31′27.6708″N 7°51′53.6328″W
- Purpose: Power
- Status: Operational
- Opening date: 2022

Dam and spillways
- Type of dam: Arch-gravity concrete dam
- Impounds: Tâmega River

Power Station
- Installed capacity: 118 MW (158,000 hp)
- Annual generation: 159 GWh

Daivões Dam (Portuguese: Barragem de Daivões) is a concrete arch-gravity dam on the Tâmega River. It is located in the municipalities of Ribeira de Pena and Cabeceiras de Basto, in Vila Real and Braga Districts, respectively, Portugal and it is part of the wider Tâmega Electricity-Generating Group formed of 3 dams and 3 plants

Iberdrola signed a 70 year concession with the Government of Portugal in July 2014 for the design, construction and operation of three projects: Alto Tâmega, Daivões and Gouvães dams.

Construction of the dam completed in July 2022.

== Dam ==
Daivões Dam is a 77.5 m tall, 264 m long dam.

== Reservoir ==
The reservoir surface area for the dam has 1.76 km^{2}.

== Power plant ==
The generating unit of the dam consists of two 57 MW Francis turbine units with a maximum flow rate of 220m³/s and a small 4.1 MW unit to turbine the ecological flow, producing 159 GWh of electricity a year. The spillways are located over the dam and consist of four radial gates with a width of 11.5 m and height of 9 m each with a maximum discharge capacities of 3,400 m³/s.

== See also ==
- List of power stations in Portugal
- List of dams and reservoirs in Portugal
