= Canedo (Ribeira de Pena) =

- Civil parish
- Location in Portugal
- Coordinates: 41.623°N 7.734°W
- Country: Portugal
- Region: Norte
- Intermunic. comm.: Alto Tâmega
- District: Vila Real
- Municipality: Ribeira de Pena

Area
  - Total: 36.16 km^{2} (13.96 sq mi)

Population (2011)
  - Total: 390
  - Density: 11/km^{2} (28/sq mi)
- Time zone: UTC+00:00 (WET)
  - Summer (DST): UTC+01:00 (WEST)

Canedo (Portuguese pronunciation: [kɐˈneðu]) is a parish in Ribeira de Pena Municipality in Portugal. The population in 2011 was 390, in an area of 36.16 km^{2}.
