= Vila Pouca de Aguiar =

- Municipality
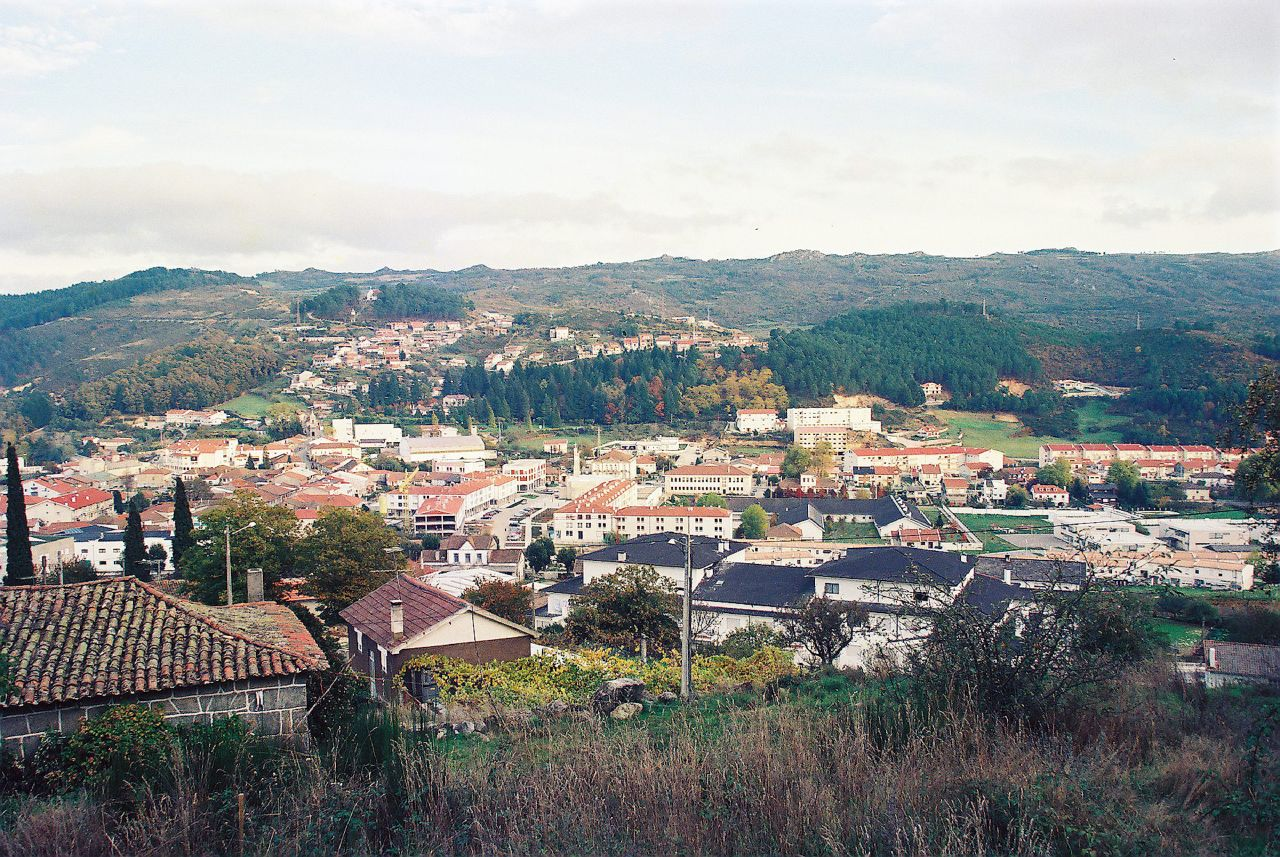
- Partial view of Vila Pouca de Aguiar

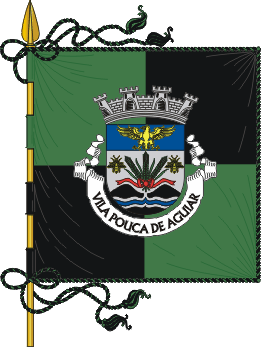
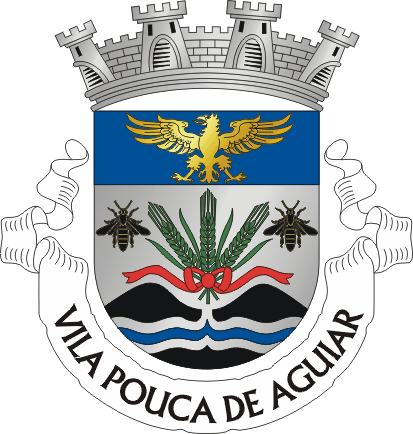
- Flag Coat of arms
- Interactive map of Vila Pouca de Aguiar
- Coordinates: 41°30′2″N 7°38′32″W
- Country: Portugal
- Region: Norte
- Intermunic. comm.: Alto Tâmega
- District: Vila Real
- Parishes: 14

Government
  - President: Alberto Machado (PPD-PSD)

Area
  - Total: 437.07 km^{2} (168.75 sq mi)
- Elevation: 797 m (2,615 ft)

Population (2024)
  - Total: 11,819
  - Density: 27.041/km^{2} (70.037/sq mi)
- Time zone: UTC+00:00 (WET)
  - Summer (DST): UTC+01:00 (WEST)
- Postal code: 5450
- Area code: 259
- Patron: Divino Salvador
- Website: http://www.cm-vpaguiar.pt

Vila Pouca de Aguiar (Portuguese pronunciation: [ˈvilɐ ˈpo(w)kɐ ðɨ ɐɣiˈaɾ]) is a town and a municipality in the Vila Real district in northern Portugal. A total of 11,819 people lived in the municipality in 2024, across an area of 437.07 square kilometres (168.75 mi^{2}), while 3,118 lived in the town in 2021. The municipality lies between the Serra do Alvão and Serra da Padrela mountains and is known for its agricultural landscape, granite extraction, and the mineral waters of Pedras Salgadas. Human settlement in the area dates back to prehistoric times, with notable remains from the Chalcolithic and Roman periods, including the gold mines of Tresminas and Jales.

== Toponymy ==
The toponym of Vila Pouca is believed to have been adopted during the 14th century, replacing the former São Salvador de Jugal. There is no known reason or exact date for this change.

There are differing opinions regarding the origin of the name Vila Pouca de Aguiar. Some authors suggest that Vila Pouca succeeded the ancient city of Cauca, once governed by Emperor Theodosius I, though this theory is considered unlikely, as the phonological change from Cauca to Pouca is not plausible. Another theory is that "Vila Pouca" originally referred to a small agrarian settlement, like many other places with the same name. "Aguiar" is in reference to the "Terra de Aguiar", an ancient administrative region that roughly coincides with the present municipality, and it was added to distinguish this settlement from others named "Vila Pouca". "Aguiar" derives from Latin: aquila, meaning "where the eagles are".

== History ==
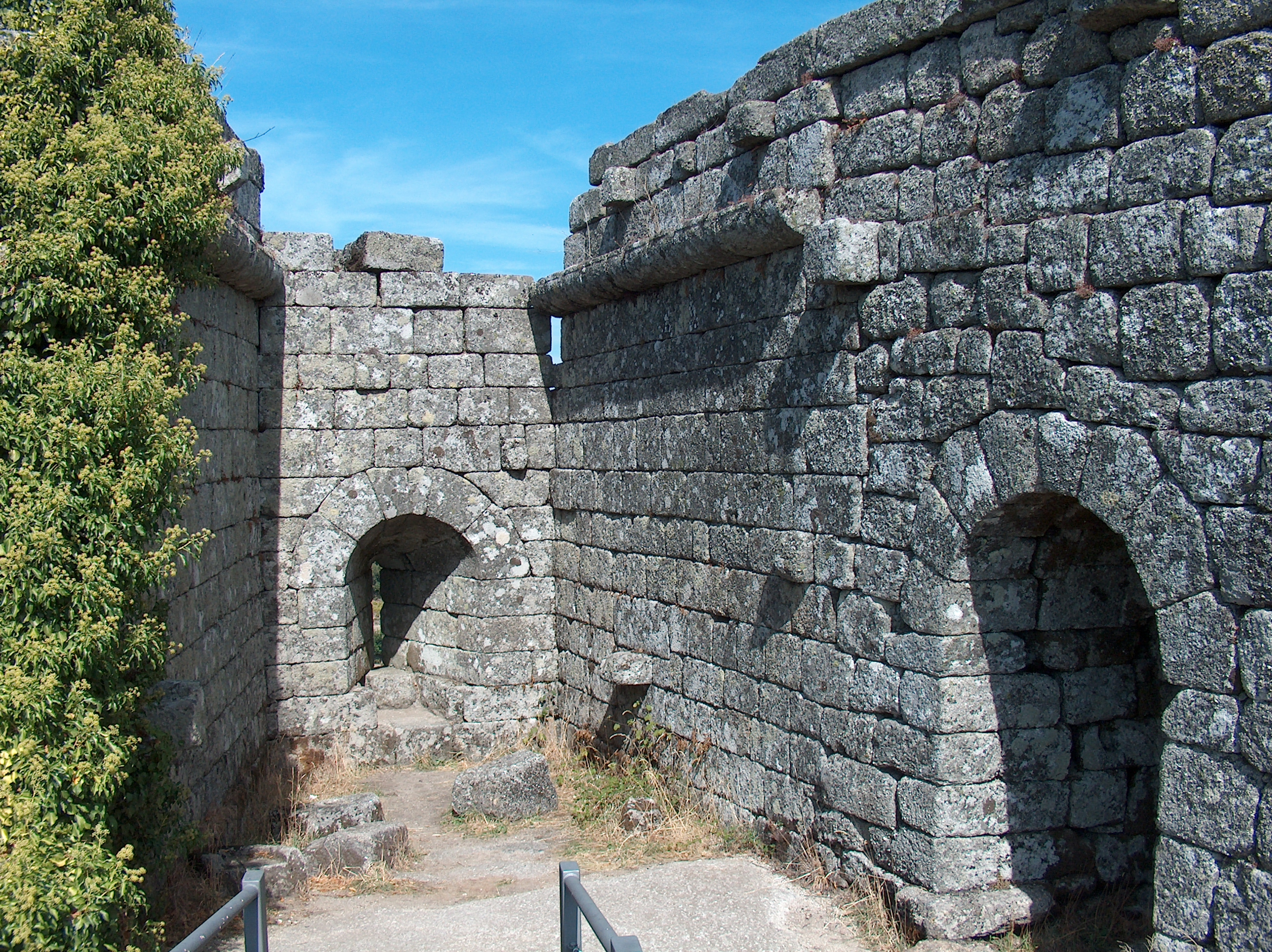
The lookout and battlements of the Castle of Pena de Aguiar

=== Early occupation ===
Human settlement in the present area of the municipality dates back to the Chalcolithic, as highlighted by archaeological findings in the Castle of Pena de Aguiar. During the Bronze Age, settlement continued in that area and in the castro of Cidadelha de Jales and the Castle of Pensalvos. Human settlement expanded during the Iron Age, a 15 castros active during this period, though by the late Iron Age, only three are believed to have remained in use.

After the Roman conquest of Iberia, the areas of Tresminas and Jales became an important centre of gold mining. It was exploited on an industrial scale during the 1st and 2nd centuries CE under direct Roman administration. The area featured open-pit and underground workings, crushing mills, washing stations, and an elaborate system of aqueducts and dams. This mining complex was connected to Panoias via a road.

The area of Panoias and the mining operations Tresminas and Jales remained important during the Suebi and Visigothic periods. Panoias appeared in the Parochiale suevorum as a civitas and served as a coin minting location for Visigothic kings Sisebut and Witteric.

=== Middle Ages ===
The earliest mention to settlements in the modern municipality of Vila Pouca de Aguiar after the Reconquista dates from 1091. It is a donation by Rodrigo Pais to the Monastery of São Bento de Arnóia of several estates, including Jugal, Soutello and Pensalvos. Jugal, or São Salvador de Jugal is the former name of Vila Pouca de Aguiar.

In the 13th century, most of the present municipality was part of the land of Aguiar de Pena (Portuguese: Terra de Aguiar de Pena) administrative territory, as was the neighbouring area of Ribeira de Pena. In the 12th and 13th centuries, this territory consisted of seven large parishes, including São Salvador de Jugal. The modern day parishes and mining areas of Alfarela de Jales, Tresminas and Vreia de Jales were a part of the lands of Panoias (Portuguese: Terra de Panoias). Additionally, Alfarela de Jales was its own municipality between 1220 and 1853, after receiving a foral from Afonso II.

According to the Inquirições of King Afonso II, the parish of São Salvador de Jugal comprised the locations of Condado, Calvos, Guilhado, Nuzedo, Fraengo and Outeiro and had a total of 28 farm estates, 20 of which were in Nuzedo. The same document indicates that Jugal was a settlement encompassing the entire parish and containing its parish church.

=== Modern era ===
During the 20th century the town and wider municipality of Vila Pouca de Aguiar saw significant mining activity, most notably in the Mina de Jales, which operated from 1933 until 1992 and was the last gold mine in Portugal to be exploited. The mine extracted a total of 23.5 tonnes of gold and 81.1 tonnes of silver and at its peak it employed hundreds of workers. The mine’s closure marked both an economic turning point and a demographic challenge for the region, as many miners and their families departed.

== Geography ==
Vila Pouca de Aguiar is located 25 kilometres (16 mi) north of Vila Real, in the northern part of the Vila Real District, within the Alto Tâmega subregion of northern Portugal. The municipality covers an area of 437.07 square kilometres (168.75 mi^{2}) and lies in a fertile valley between the Alvão and Padrela mountain ranges. The landscape is predominantly agricultural in the valley and pastureland in the highlands, along with several natural and cultural landmarks. Among the main points of interest are the Castle of Pena de Aguiar, the mining complex of Tresminas, the Pedras Salgadas thermal baths and the Dolmens of Alvão.

=== Parishes ===
Administratively, the municipality is divided into 14 civil parishes (freguesias):

- Alfarela de Jales
- Alvão
- Bornes de Aguiar
- Bragado
- Capeludos
- Pensalvos e Parada de Monteiros
- Sabroso de Aguiar
- Soutelo de Aguiar
- Telões
- Tresminas
- Valoura
- Vila Pouca de Aguiar
- Vreia de Bornes
- Vreia de Jales

The parish of Sabroso de Aguiar was created in 1993.

=== Climate ===
Vila Pouca de Aguiar has a climate similar to that of the Terra Fria Transmontana, a region in the Bragança District.

Climate data for Santa Marta da Montanha, altitude: 866 m (2,841 ft)
Month	Jan	Feb	Mar	Apr	May	Jun	Jul	Aug	Sep	Oct	Nov	Dec	Year
Average precipitation mm (inches)	250 (9.8)	222 (8.7)	188 (7.4)	141 (5.6)	140 (5.5)	80 (3.1)	30 (1.2)	34 (1.3)	88 (3.5)	172 (6.8)	217 (8.5)	237 (9.3)	1,799 (70.7)
Source: Portuguese Environment Agency

== Demographics ==
As of 2024, there were a total of 11,819 people living in the municipality of Vila Pouca de Aguiar, while as of 2021, 3,118 people lived in the town. As of 2001, population density was highest in the town of Vila Pouca de Aguiar and in the parish of Sabroso de Aguiar. Like many municipalities in the Portuguese interior, Vila Pouca de Aguiar has experienced rural depopulation over recent decades.

== Economy ==
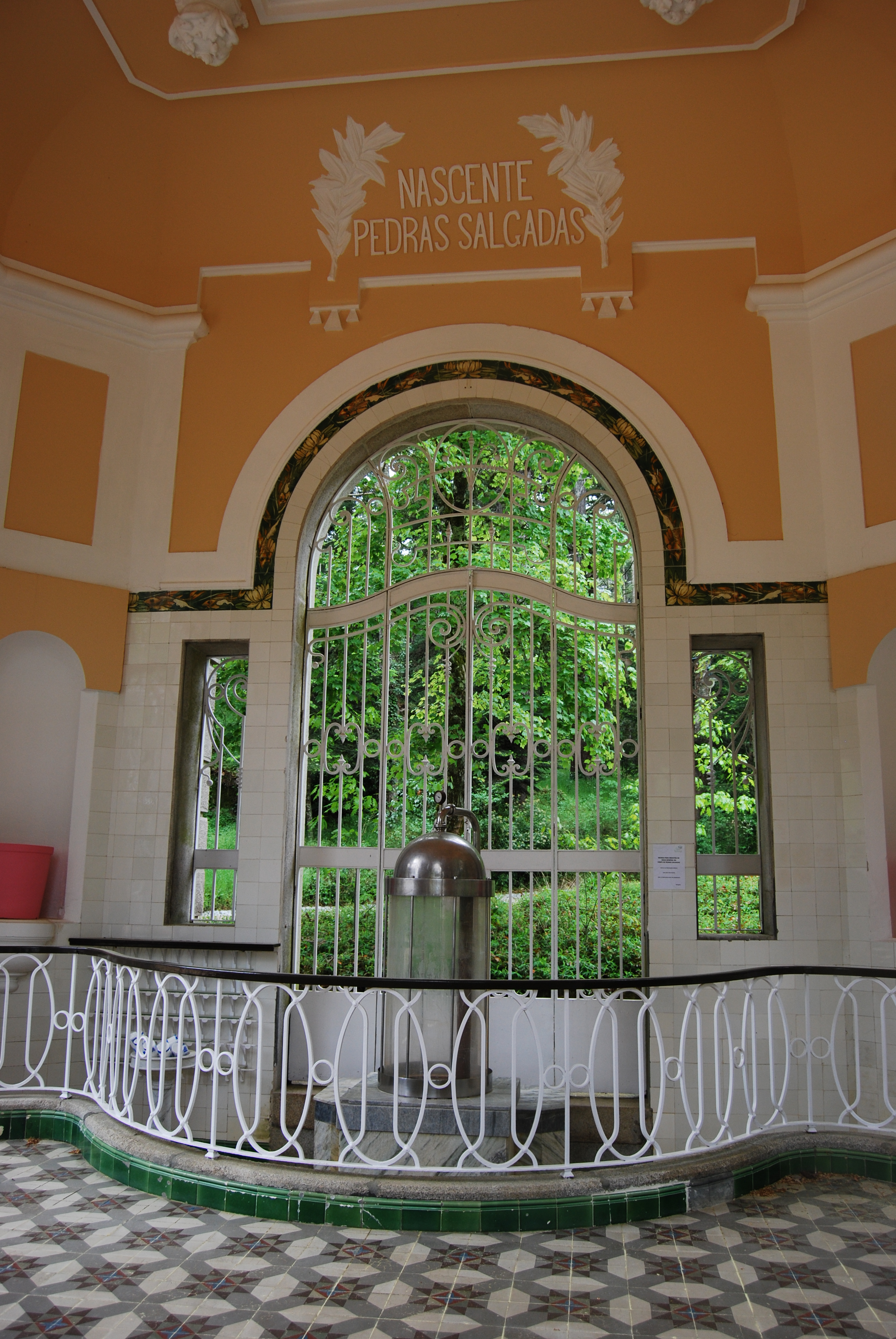
Mineral water spring in Pedras Salgadas

Granite quarrying is one of the main economic activities in Vila Pouca de Aguiar, generating over 1,000 direct jobs and a similar number of indirect ones, with an estimated annual production value exceeding €30 million. Quarrying activity is concentrated in three main areas, Pedras Salgadas, Telões, and Falperra, where the extracted stone range from gray to yellow. Gold was formerly mined in Jales until 1992 and attempts to restart operations failed in 2016.

Water extraction is carried out by the Super Bock Group in Pedras Salgadas. In 2023, the Pedras Salgadas brand was the seventh largest producer of mineral water, bottling 40.6 million litres.

The economy of Vila Pouca de Aguiar is traditionally based on agriculture and livestock farming, supported by the region’s fertile soils, climate and water from the Alvão reservoir. Cereals, potatoes, vegetables, and some wine are cultivated in the municipality, while cattle are raised on the pastures of the surrounding valleys. Chestnuts are another crop with some importance for the municipality, as it is a part of the Padrela Chestnut area, a product with Protected Designation of Origin.

In apiculture, the municipality was home to about 97 registered beekeepers, some 288 apiaries and around 5,795 colonies in 2024, producing about 40.5 tonnes of honey per year and generating approximately €142,000 in income. Mushroom production grew in importance during the 2010s, with the opening of three production units, at a total investment of €300,000, adding up to a yearly production of 20 tonnes in 2014.

Tourism is a significant economic activity in the municipality, driving investment in the region. Relevant sites including the spa town of Pedras Salgadas and a mining interpretative center in Jales, focusing on the region's history with gold mining.

== Architecture ==
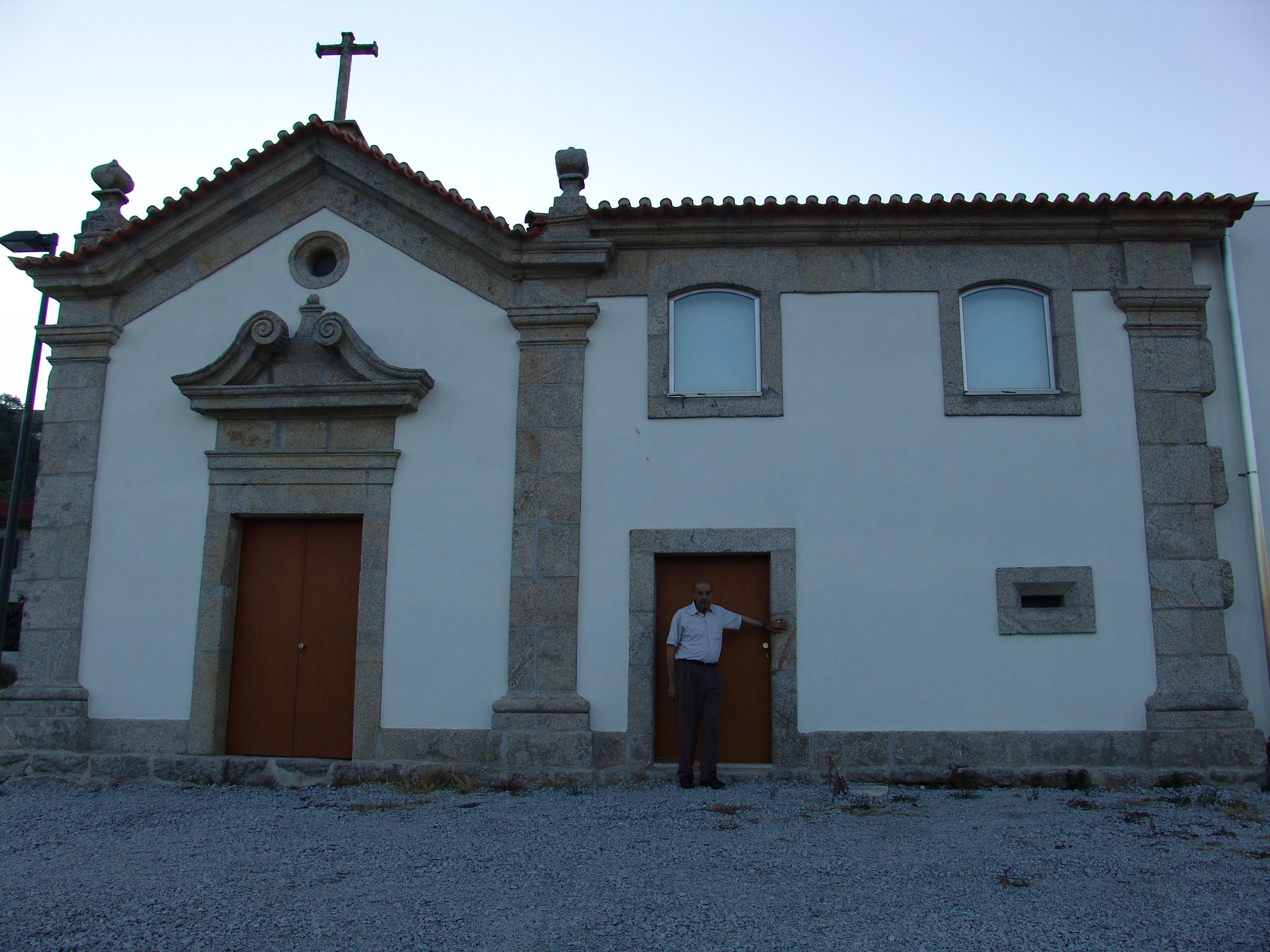
The Casa do Condado of Ferreira Botelho and Albino Ângelo Ferreira Botelho, today the Municipal Museum

=== Prehistoric ===
- Dolmen of Serra do Alvão (Portuguese: Anta da Serra do Alvão), a funerary complex of dolmens and menhirs in the civil parish of Soutelo de Aguiar;

=== Civil ===
- Castle of Pena de Aguiar (Portuguese: Castelo de Pena de Aguiar/Castelo de Aguiar de Pena), Romanesque castle composed of rock, with three distinct spaces, barbican tower and acropolis, surrounded by a line of walls forming a circular enclosure with low plan, in the civil parish of Telões;
- House of the County (Portuguese: Casa do Condado), the Padre José Rafael Rodrigues municipal museum and former home of the Ferreira Botelho family;

== Infrastructure ==
=== Transport ===
The municipality is situated at the crossing of two major road networks: the A7, linking Vila Pouca de Aguiar to Guimarães and Póvoa de Varzim to the west, and the A24 connecting the municipality with Vila Real and Viseu to the south and to Chaves and the Spanish border to the north. The area is also connected by national roads: EN2 crosses the municipality north to south, similarly to A24, EN206 heads east towards Guimarães, similarly to A7, and heads west towards Valpaços as regional road 206, and EN212, connecting the municipality to Alfarela de Jales and Murça.

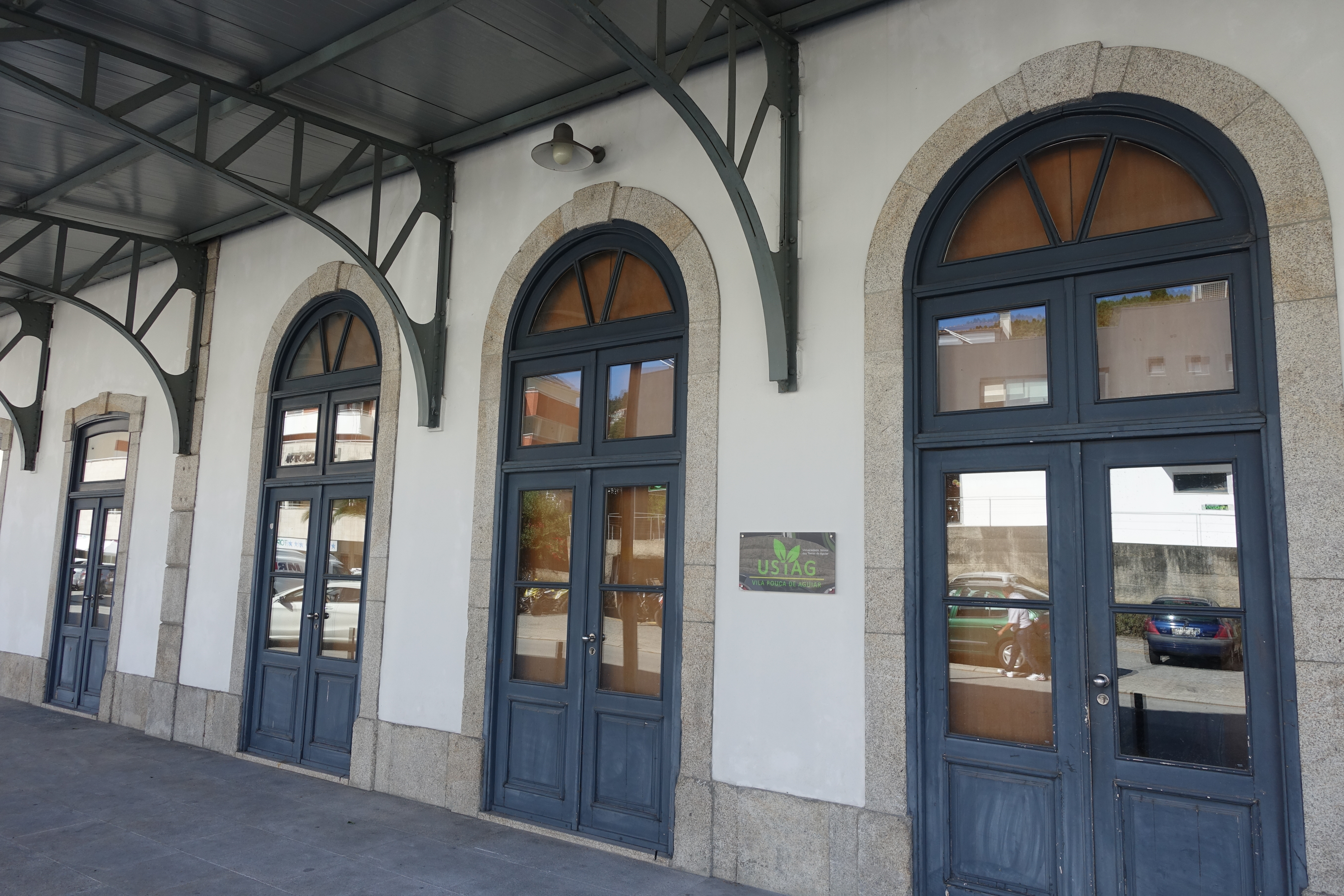
Former Vila Pouca de Aguiar railway station

Vila Pouca de Aguiar was formerly connected by the Corgo railway line to Chaves to the north and Vila Real and Régua to the south. The former railway bed between Vila Real and Chaves, with a total distance of 64 kilometres (40 mi), has been converted into a pathway for bicycles and pedestrians.

=== Energy ===
There are two hydroelectric dams in the municipality, the Alto Tâmega Dam and the Gouvães Dam, which are part of the Gigabattery of the Tâmega, a renewable energy production and storage project by Iberdrola. This project has a yearly production capacity of 1.766 GWh, equivalent to the combined electricity demand of the nearby cities of Braga and Guimarães and a storage capacity of 40 million kWh.

== Notable citizens ==
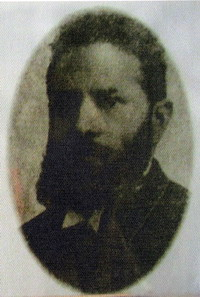
Dr. Martiniano Ferreira Botelho

- Martiniano Ferreira Botelho (ca.1853 – ca.1939), a doctor, druggist, politician and humanitarian, known for his local service to the community and his treatise on the medicinal use of the waters of the area.
- André Pires (born 1989), a motorcycle racer.
- Manuel de Sampaio (1766-1844) a military leader, noble and Miguelist general.
- Rui Sampaio (born 1987) a Portuguese defensive midfield footballer with about 329 club appearances.

== Twin towns ==
Vila Pouca de Aguiar is twinned with:

- Bettendorf, Luxembourg
- Fabero del Bierzo, Spain
