= Cervo =

Cervo may refer to:

== Places ==
=== Italy ===
- Cervo, Liguria, a comune in the province of Imperia in the region of Liguria
- Cervo (river), a tributary of the River Sesia in the Piedmont region

=== Portugal ===
- Cervo (Ribeira de Pena), a civil parish in the municipality of Ribeira de Pena

=== Spain ===
- Cervo, Lugo, a municipality of the Province of Lugo

== Other uses ==
- Suzuki Cervo, a small Kei car made by Japanese carmaker Suzuki
