= Castle of Pena de Aguiar =

Medieval castle in Telões, Vila Pouca de Aguiar, Portugal

- Castelo de Pena de Aguiar
- Vila Real, Douro, Norte in Portugal
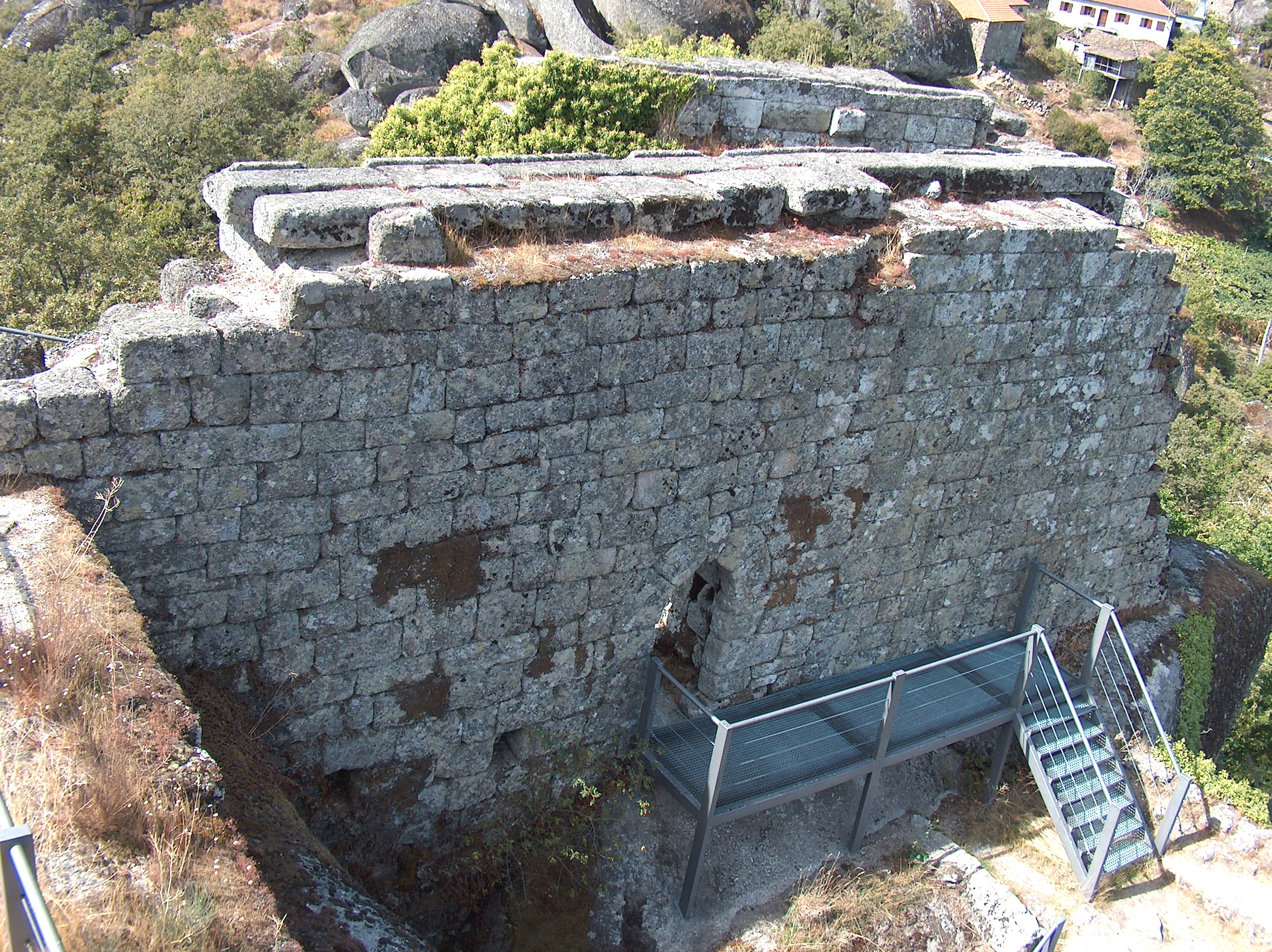
- One of the major sections of the walled castle fortification

Site information
- Type: Castle
- Owner: Portuguese Republic
- Open to the public: Public

Location
- Coordinates: 41°28′10.1″N 7°40′48.4″W

Site history
- Built: 11th century
- Materials: Granite

The Castle of Pena de Aguiar (Castelo de Pena de Aguiar) is a medieval castle, alternately the Castle of Aguiar da Pena, situated in the civil parish of Telões, in the municipality of Vila Pouca de Aguiar, in the Portuguese district of Vila Real.

== History ==
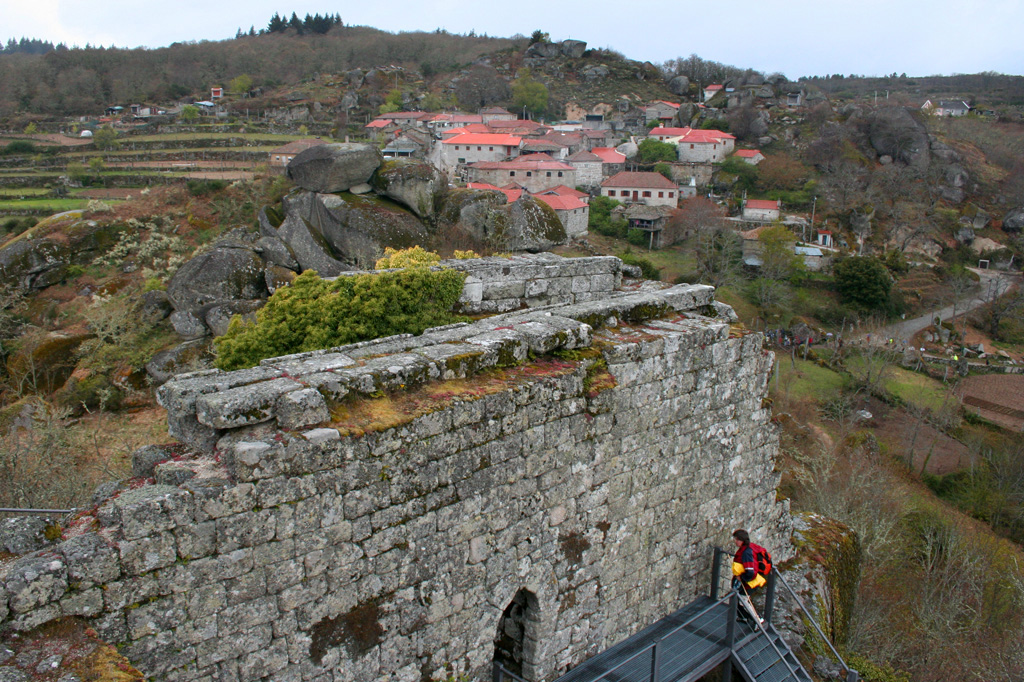
A view of the western wall and pedregulhos facing the village

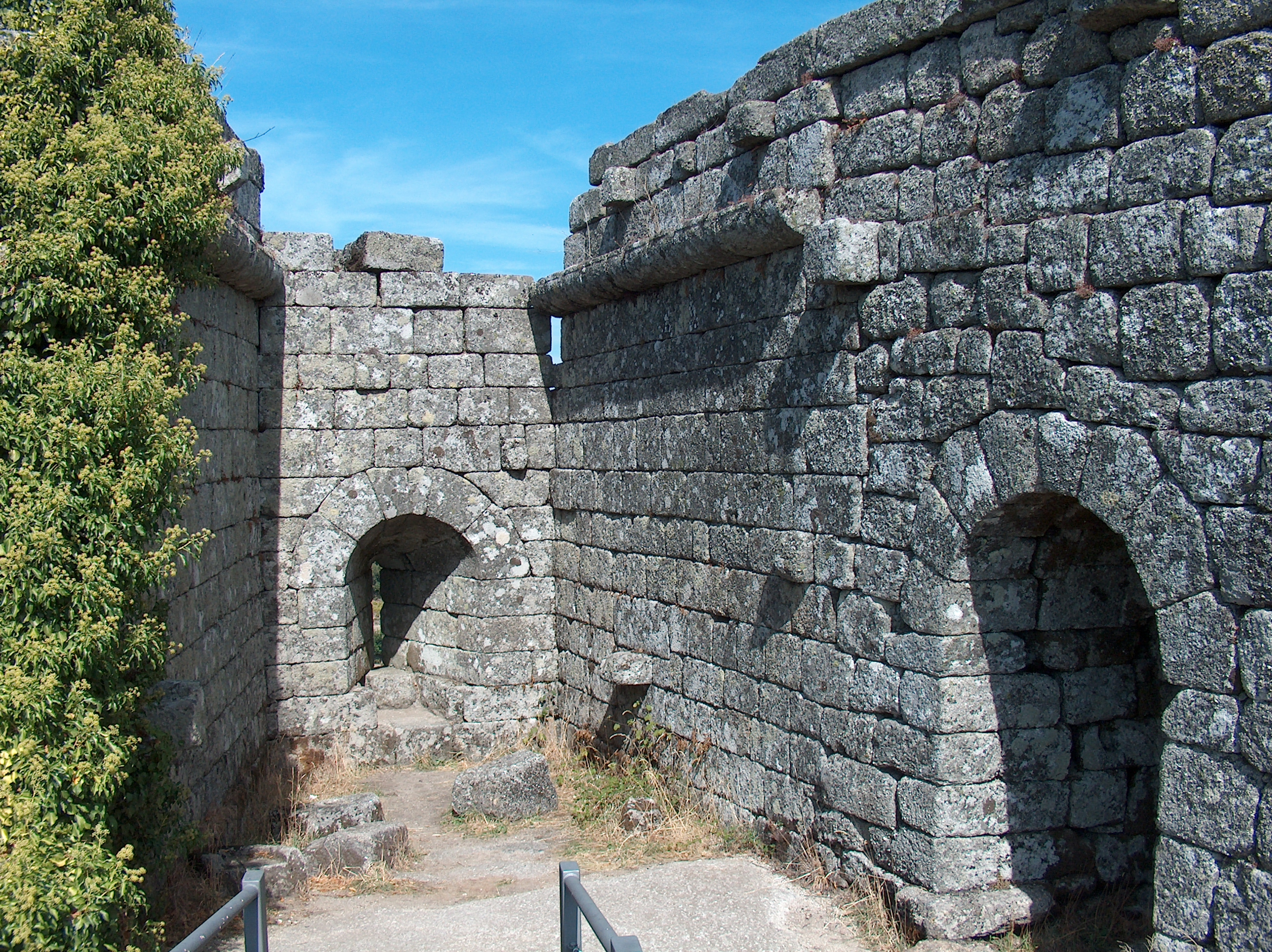
The main walls of the keep and gates

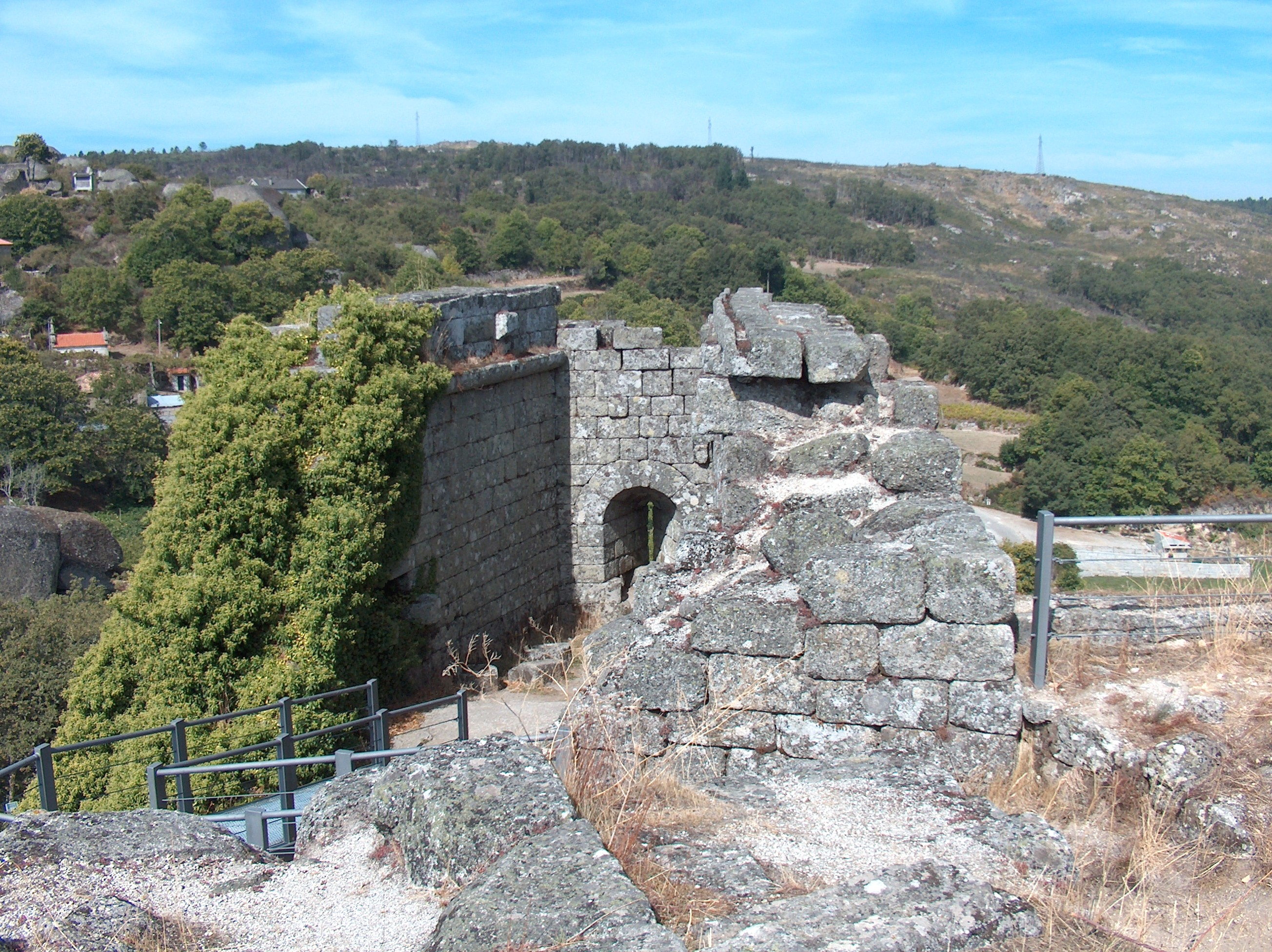
A view of the same walls showing a perspective of the landscape

In the first century B.C. a Roman military fort was constructed to overlook the important roadway between Aquas Flavias (Chaves) and Lamecum (Lamego). At that time, the Romans were attracted to the region due to the presence of gold ore, silver and lead. In the following centuries, the region was successively occupied by Visigoths and Muslims until the eighth century.

By the 11th century, following the Christian Reconquista of the territory, the Kings of León recovered and restructured the former Visigothic administrative center. There are references to the conquest of the region by troops of Ferdinand I of León. At that time the countships of the region were reestablished, resulting in the construction of fortified residences that served as shelters and residences for the masters of the land.

=== Medieval ===
Between the beginning of the 12th century and 13th century, the castle of Aguiar was constructed, and likely completed during the reign of Sancho I. At this time, the "castle" was an important strategic point in the Terra de Aguiar (the nucleus of municipality of Vila Pouca de Aguiar) and inhabited by partisans of D. Afonso Henriques (1112–1185), later referenced in medieval Hagiography in Santa Senhorinha de Basto. For this reason, the region was invaded and the Castle of Aguiar besieged by Leonese forces, that were charged with bringing the region to heal or imprisoning the supporters of Afonso Henriques. An important event in the independence of Portugal, it was D. Gonçalo Mendes de Sousas, master of the dominions of Aguair and Panóis, and man-at-arms of the nascent King who quickly hastened to give aid to the forces at Pena de Aguiar.

Later, during the reign of King D. Afonso III (1248–1279), the parish of Telões received its first Carta de Foral (Foral charter) on 10 July 1255. At this time, though, the fortification had already begun to lose its strategic importance, and following 1258, the population began to gradually abandon the maintenance of the defensive line.

At the end of the 14th century, there were works completed in the barbican and the embrasure hall; it is unclear whether the public works were destined to the castle's consolidation or from repairs. By the beginning of the 16th century, the village of Telões lost its administrative importance, and was integrated into the foral associated with Aguiar da Pena in 1515. Ironically, it was during this time that more information on the castle alcaldes were specified, including: Diogo Lopes de Azevedo; Fernão Martins de Souza (from 17 July 1534); João de Souza Guedes; and Jerónimo de Souza Machado (1583–1594).

The structure was finally abandoned in 1527, due to a progressive change in warfare dependent on gunpowder.

On a 28 December 1804 report, there is evidence that the Province of Trás-os-Montes was unprotected, without fort or military fortifications, during the Spanish invasion of 1762, resulting in the assault of Chaves, Bragança and Miranda, and attacks on castles in the region. A circular was issued on 23 September 1861, restating the problems that existed in the northern defences, from the Ministro da Guerra (Minister of War) referring to the fortifications of the province.

=== 20th century ===
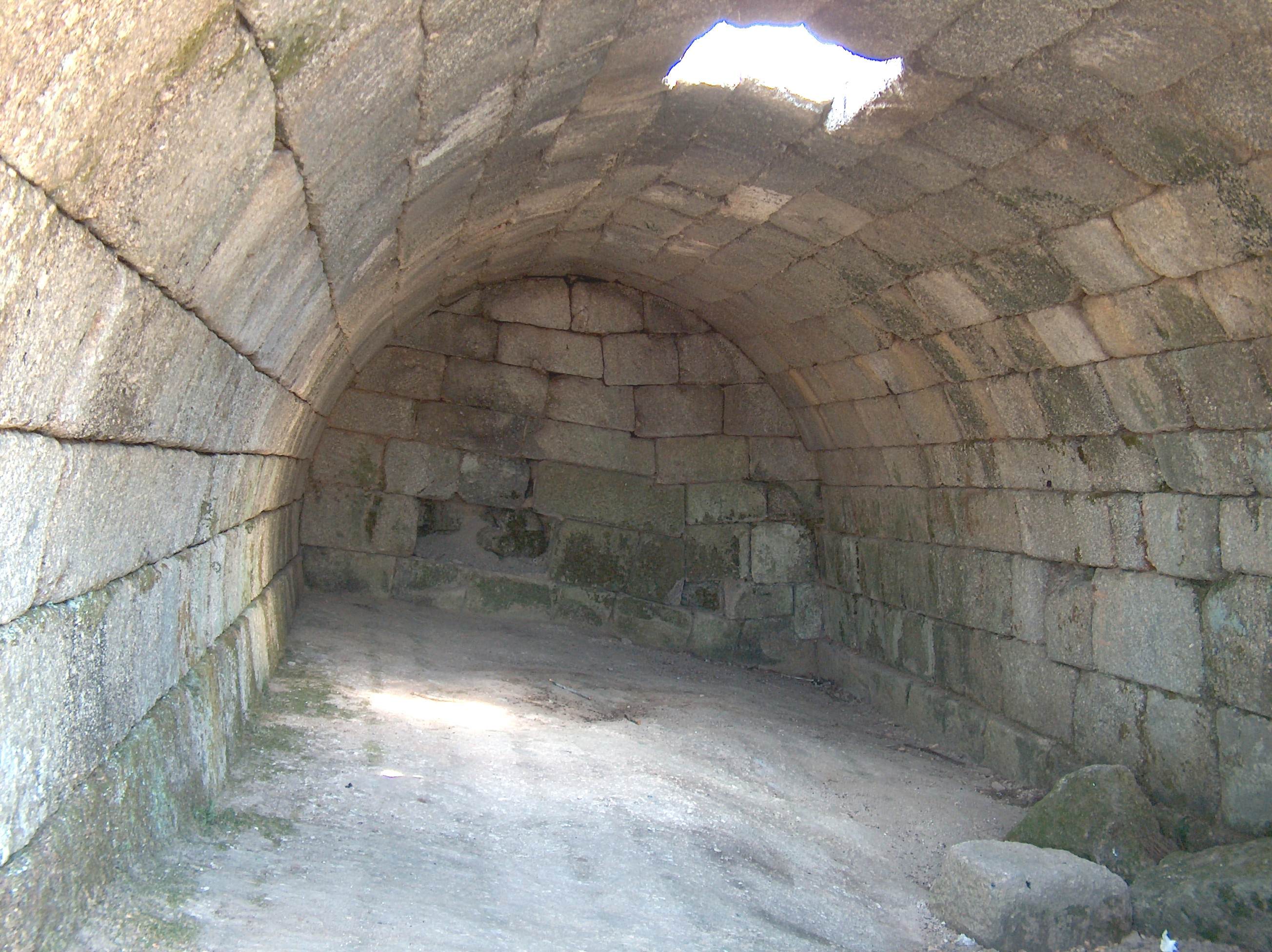
A view of the rounded cavern of the cistern

Between 1982 and 1984, there were archaeological interventions at the castle, under the direction of Mário Jorge Barroca and António J. Cardoso Morais, following its 26 February 1982 classification as a Monumento Nacional (National Monument). Similarly, Susana Oliveira Jorge investigated the pre-historic underpinnings of the settlement, during the same time.

Following a 175,000 Euro program of recuperation and restoration (that included illumination, public washrooms and parking area) by the Instituto Português do Património Arquitectónico (Portuguese Institute for Architectural Heritage) and Leader II European Community program, the site was re-inaugurated on 21 July 2001 in order to promote tourism in the region. In addition to the work by IPPAR, the municipal council of Vila Pouca de Aguiar acquired the ruined house addorsing the castle and created an interpretative centre, in addition to initiating projects to provide greater safety to the fortifications and structures.

In a second phase, there were interventions to consolidate and restore the castle's dependencies, repairing many of the walls in risk of collapse, establishing railing for dangerous areas along the walls and the construction of metal passages for security. The aim of these projects was to integrate the tourism potential of the castle, with the three Roman mines in Vila Pouca de Aguiar and the Panóis rock-art sanctuary in Vila Real.

== Architecture ==
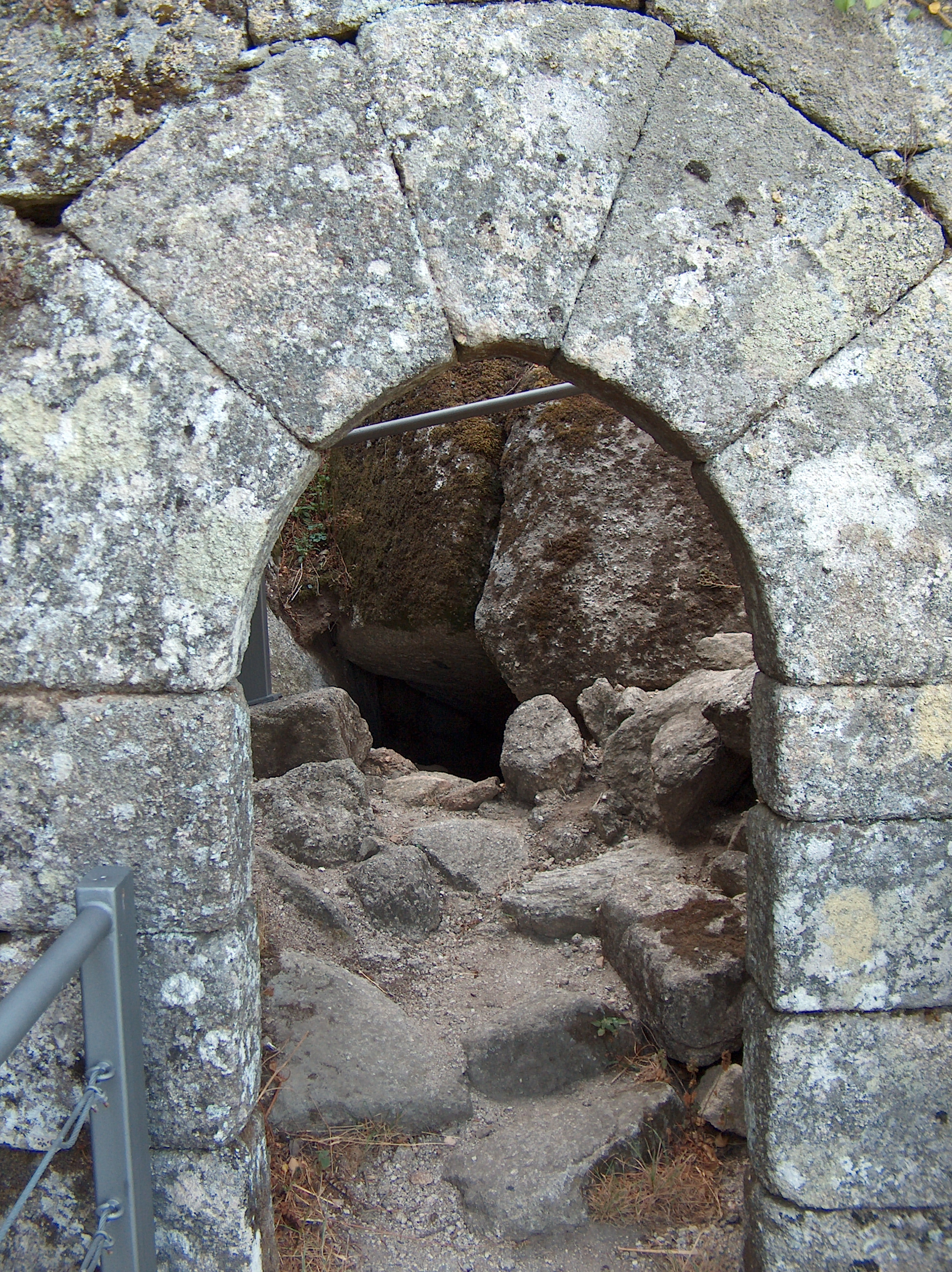
One of the passageways to the castle interior

The castle is located in a rural isolated location over the granite cliffs of the Serra do Alvão, a difficult escarpment near the village of Castelo, dominating the fertile valley of Vila Pouca de Aguiar.

The remains of the castle structure is dominated by Romanesque elements, that included two towers: a rectangular northern plan, connected by a semi-circular curtain of walls to another tower in the southeast. The second tower includes five irregular faces. The western wall is broken by a doorway to the barbican, whose walls are addorsed by large boulders. The second access, in the northern wall, links to the small square, delimited by both towers. The barbican and rectangular square were adapted to the conditions of the terrain, comprising originally two floors. The tower, which is contiguous, also includes a vaulted compartment, likely a converted cistern, over other dependencies long since in ruin.

The castle was a military strategic point in the medieval lands of Aguiar da Pena. Archaeological excavations at the site concentrated on the centre of the castle, although surveys were undertaken in the area below the castle. In addition to the study of the monument's structure, the excavations detected and unearthed a rich collection of ceramic and metallic objects, that included a documented group of silver artefacts. In addition, the discovery of the arrowheads and dart points, provide a glimpse of the battles that occurred at the fortress. Excavations in the area below the castle, some 200 metres (660 ft) from the castle, unearthed the archaeological remains of a pre-historic village of residential and defensive nature, with various stages of occupation, dating from the pre-historic, to late Bronze Age and Roman occupation of the Iberian peninsula.
