= Gontães =

- Village
- Location in Portugal
- Coordinates: 41°18′N 7°50′W
- Country: Portugal
- Region: Norte
- Intermunic. comm.: Douro
- District: Vila Real
- Municipality: Vila Real
- Civil parish: Pena, Quintã e Vila Cova

Population
  - Total: 180

Gontães is a village in the parish of Pena, Quintã e Vila Cova, in the municipality of Vila Real, northern Portugal. Located at approximately 800 meters above sea level, the village has a fantastic view over the surrounding landscape.

== History ==
The name Gontães is of Germanic origin and the foundation of the village dates back to the end of 5th century, during the barbarian invasions. Despite its Germanic origin, there is evidence of Roman occupation. The Romans took advantage of the abundant iron in the region, due to its excellent quality.

== Population ==
The population of Gontães is 180 people, most of which are elderly. A large section of the population of the village emigrated between the 60s’ and 90s’, and since then there has been a decline in the population – nowadays the number of inhabitants under the age of 30 is extremely low. However, these emigrants usually come back to visit the village either at Easter, Christmas or during the summer months.

== Geography ==
Gontães is located in the municipality and district of Vila Real, in the region of Trás-os-Montes at 800 meters above sea level. As is typical in this region, Gontães lies on a mountainous relief intersected by fertile valleys.

== Cultural heritage ==
=== Main Church ===
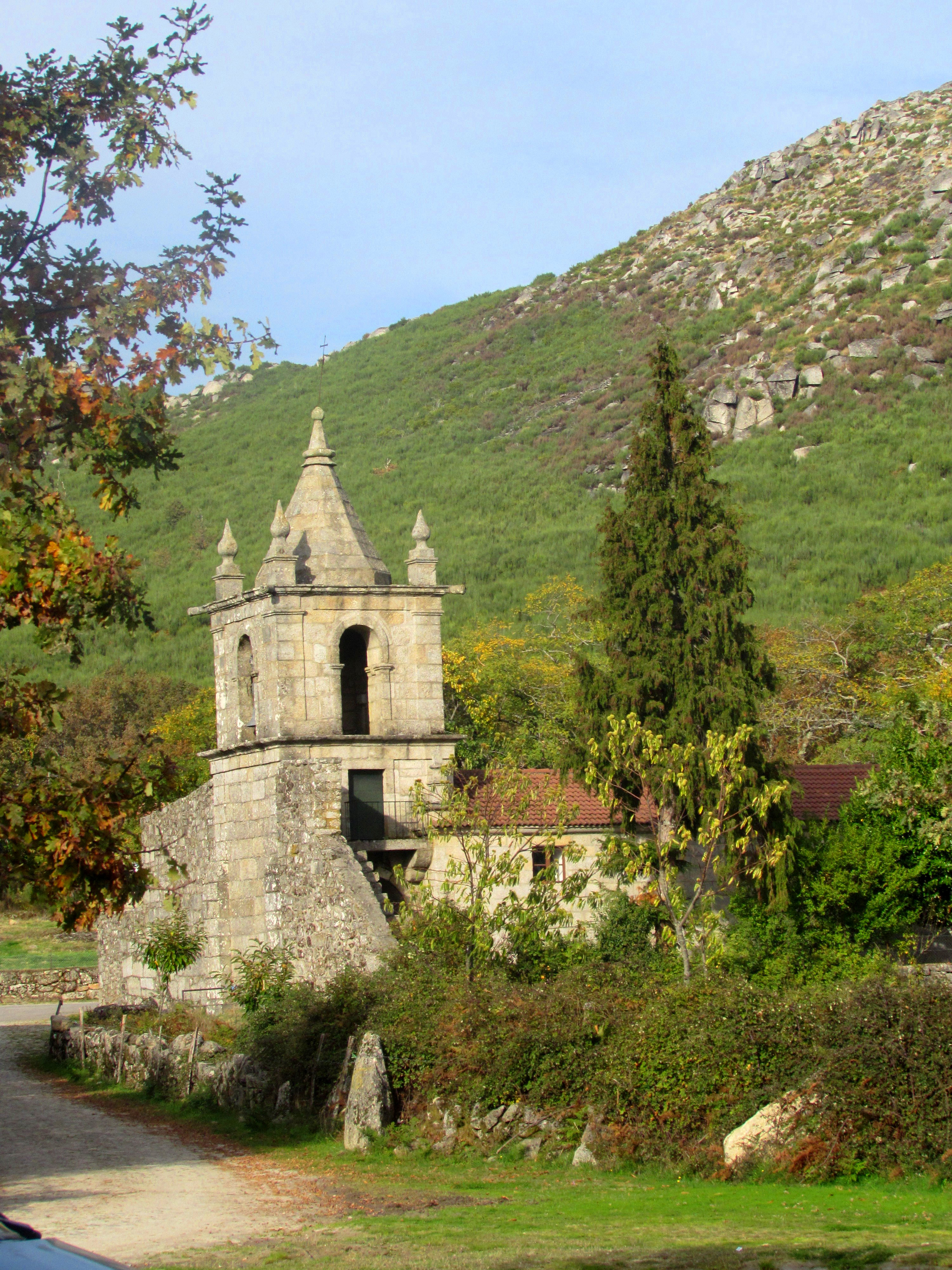
Igreja Matriz

This church was moved and rebuilt in the 18th century. The original church was built in a Romanesque style, as can be seen from the exterior of the current church. Although the current church maintains the Romanesque exterior, its interior has been renovated to a plain architectural style, characterised by being a "plainer" version of the baroque style. However, gothic features can also be seen.

=== Saint Sofia Chapel ===
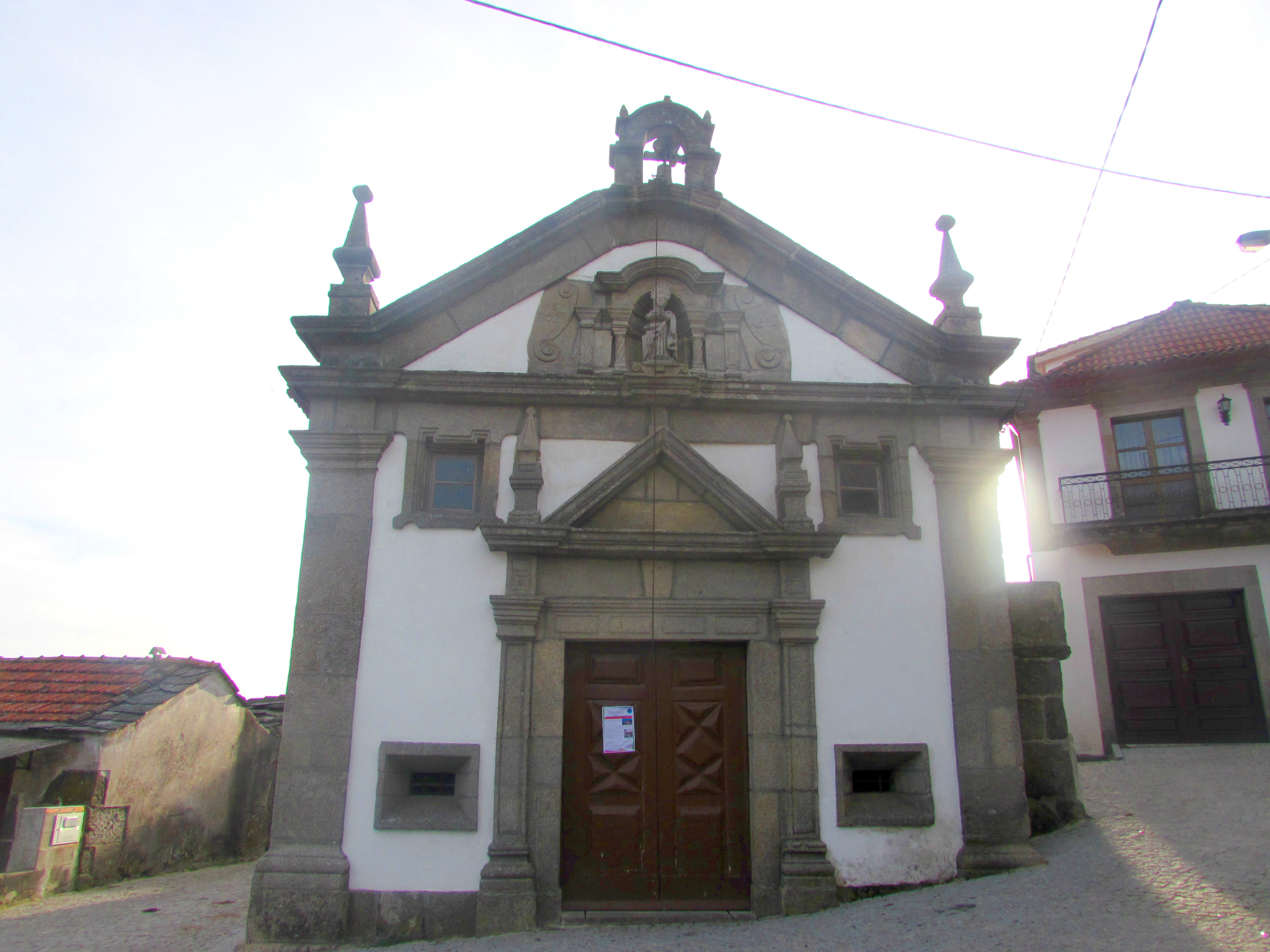
Capela de Santa Sofia

This chapel dates from the 18th century and was formally added to the diocese of Braga on 12 September 1733. Manoel Gonçalves (1703–1767) was responsible for its construction.

=== Our Lady of Outeiros Chapel ===
Located on top of a hill, this chapel was built in the late eighteenth or early nineteenth century. The chapel was built in a plain architectural style, and is made from granite. Its exterior is extremely simple.

=== Mills ===
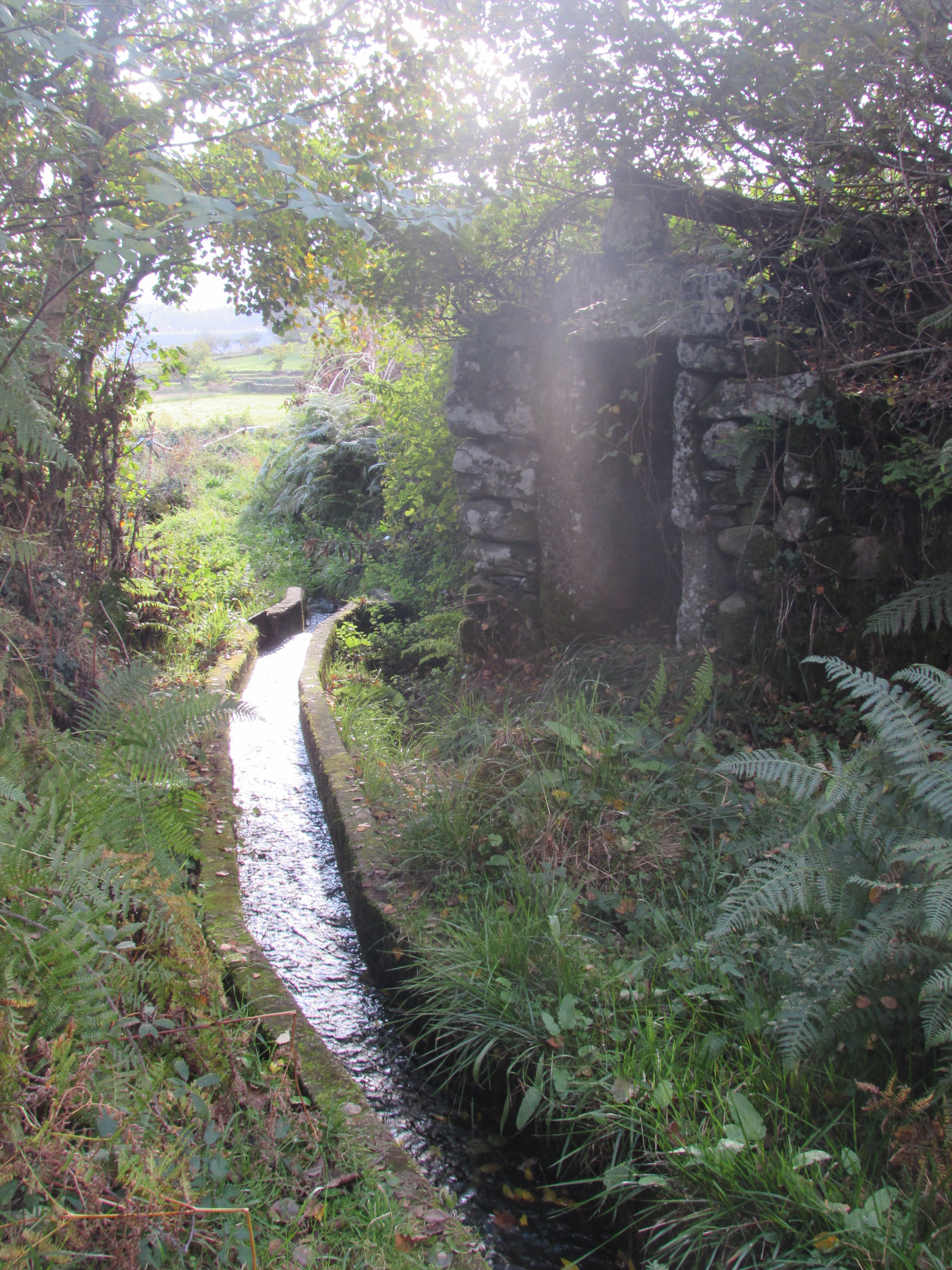
Water mill

There are four water mills in this area, which were used to grind the cereals grown locally (rye and corn). The schedule for using the mills was decided by drawing lots and each inhabitant could only use the mill once a week.

=== Mines ===
The Cando mines are located at the edge of the village, near Vila Cova. In 1880, the German company Maximiliano Scherek was using the mines to their full potential. The operation ceased for unknown reasons, sometime before the 1940s. The exploitation of the mines in general is thought to date back to the Roman era. Wolfram, antimony, tin, lead and iron could be found in the Cando mines.

== Culture ==
=== Weaving ===
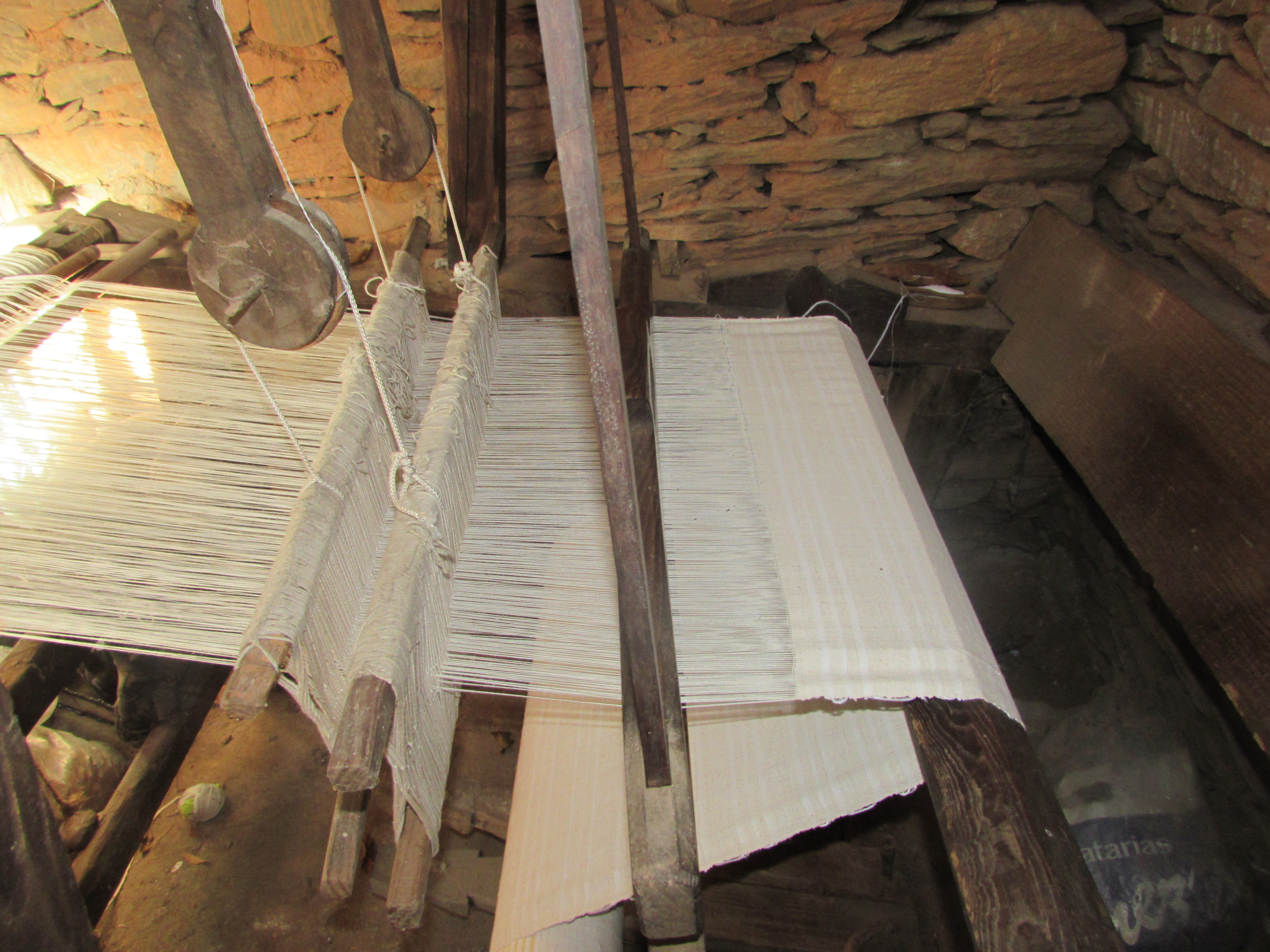
Weaving

Weaving was a local practice used to make towels, sheets, curtains and textiles, which were often decorated with crochet and embroidery. This is no longer a custom of the area. Nowadays, there is only one loom in Gontães.

=== Opas ===
The term ‘opas’, is used in villages to refer to people who take part in a funeral procession, but it's actually the name of the cloaks that they wear. In other places, both adults and children can be ‘opas’ but in the village of Gontães only children can take part. In Gontães red cloaks are worn.

=== The Minhava family ===
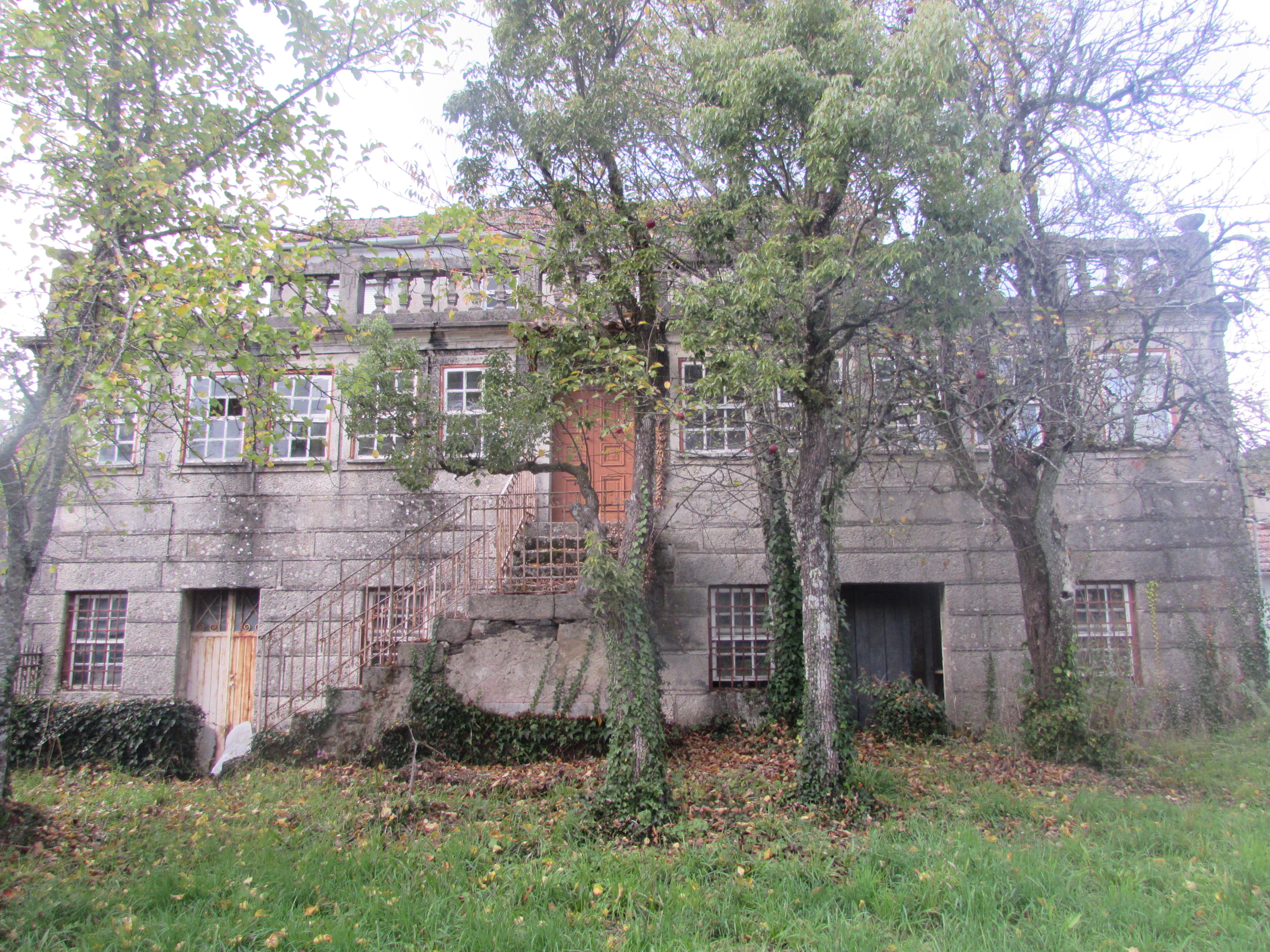
Minhava family house

The Minhava family was the most influential family in Gontães. The family provided a large part of the education that locals received, and taught many villagers to play musical instruments, as well as being very influential in the church.

=== Other places of interest ===
The main water fountain, which was the only source of drinking water in the village, was destroyed so that a road could be built. To substitute it, water fountains were built in several places in the village: in Largo da Fonte; in the middle of the village, on the road leading up to the chapel and next to the Santa Sofia Chapel.

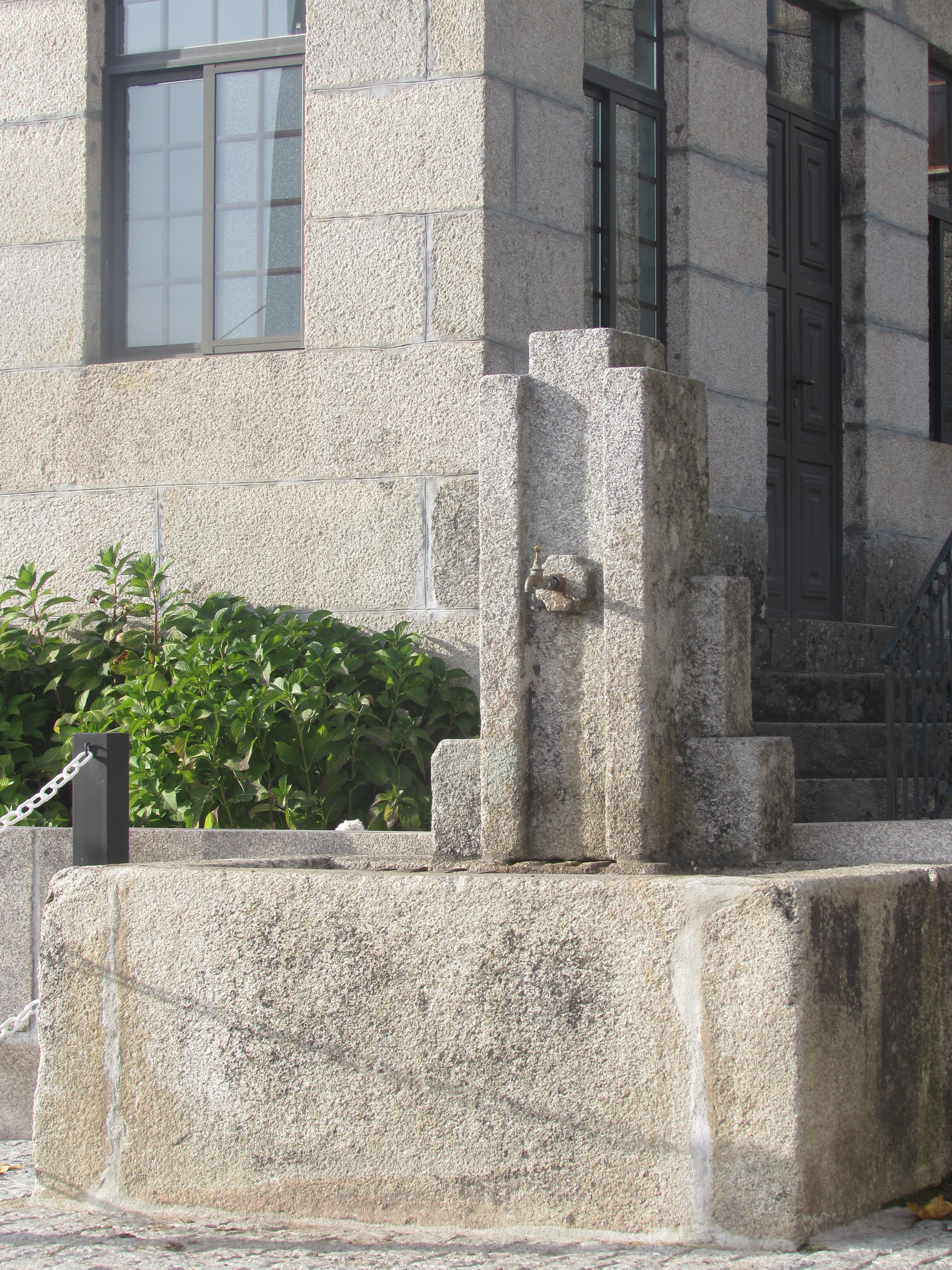
Water fountain 1

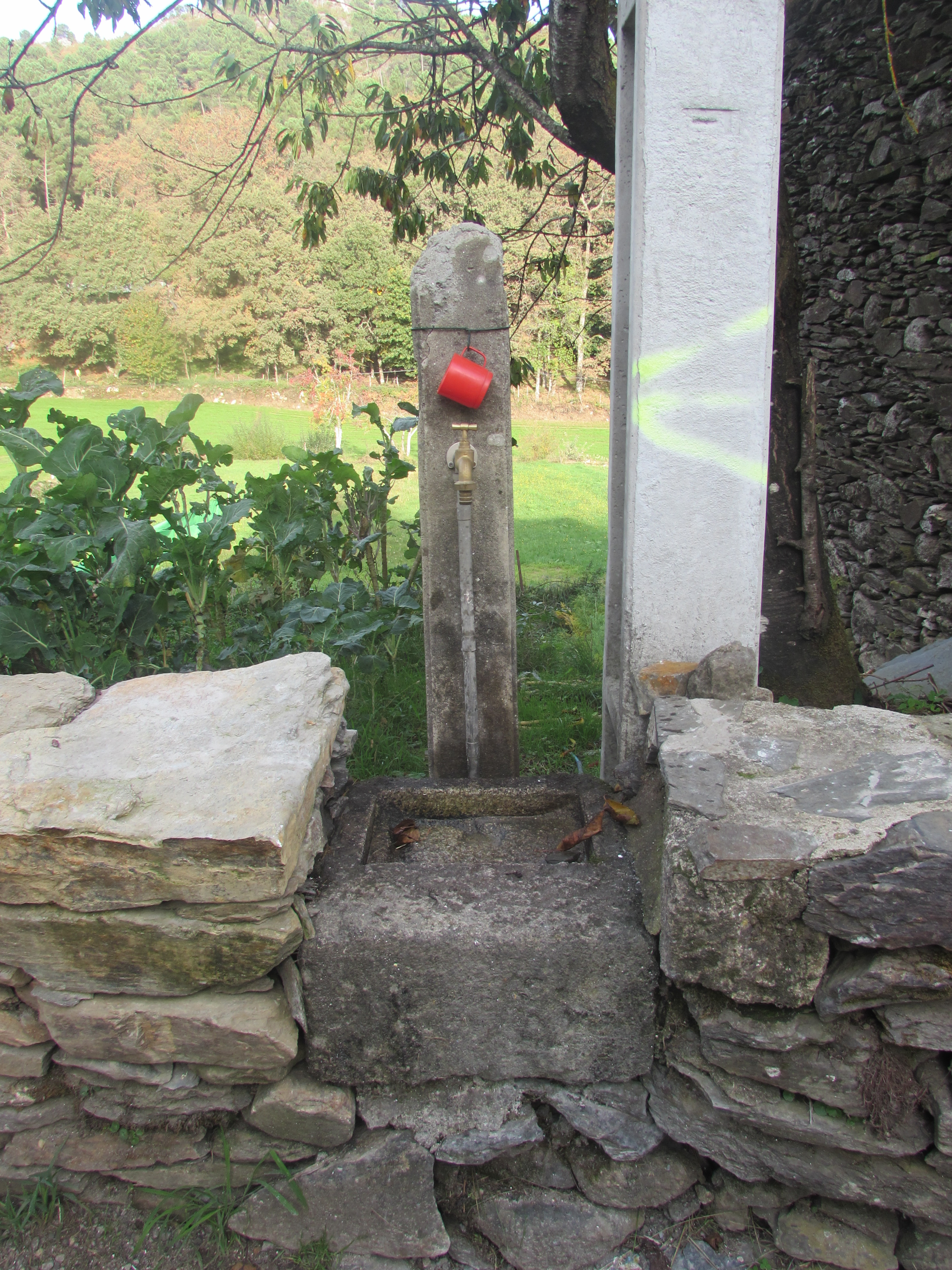
Water fountain 2

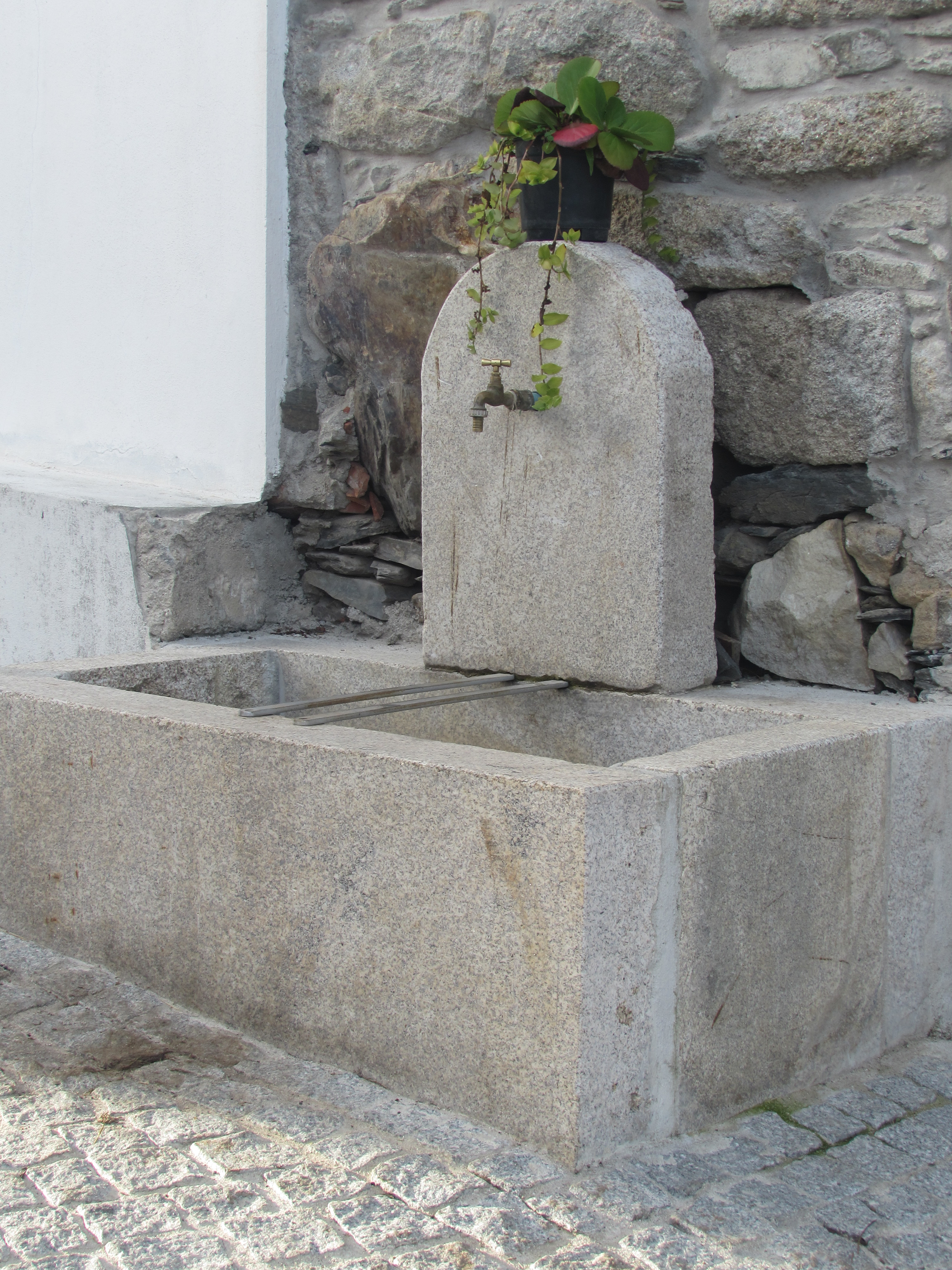
Water fountain 3

== Agriculture ==
Among the crops grown in the village are corn, potatoes, rye, beans, fava beans, peas, cabbage, onions, carrots, parsley and tomatoes. Hay, corn and straw were also produced to feed cattle. Fruit trees such as cherry trees, pear trees, apple trees, peach trees, walnut trees, fig trees and chestnut trees, can still be found, as well as the new addition of kiwis
