= House of the County =

Coordinates: 41.4959606°N 7.6484632°W

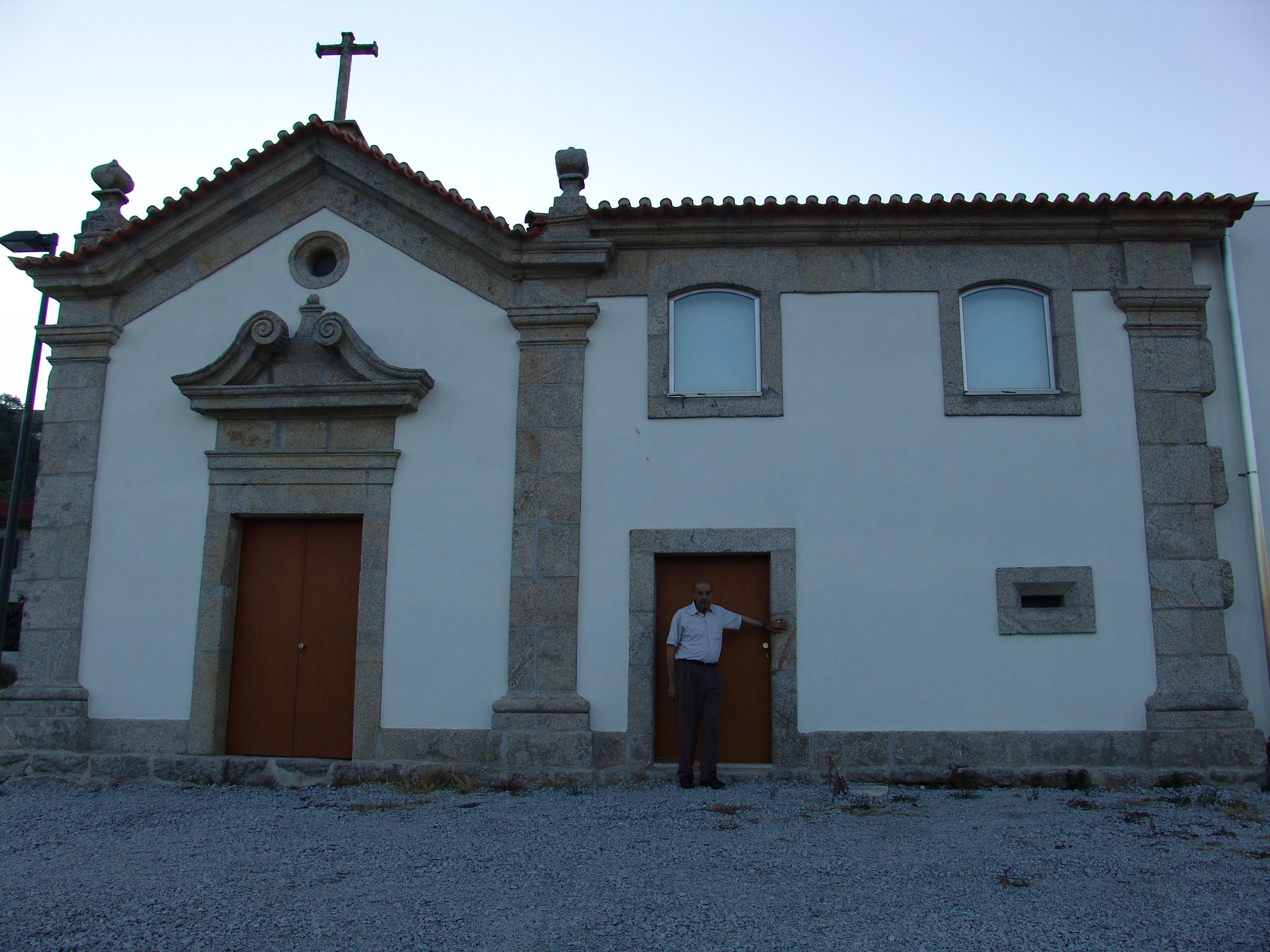
House of the County - Museum of Vila Pouca de Aguiar

The House of the County or Casa do Condado is since 2007 the museum of Vila Pouca de Aguiar in Portugal. It includes a collection of cultural goods constituted by archaeological and ethnographic materials of great value from the region.

The House of the County or 'Casa do Condado' is the place of birth of Doctor Martiniano Ferreira Botelho.
