= Pedras Salgadas =

Spa town in Vila Real, Portugal

Coordinates: 41°32′N 7°36′W

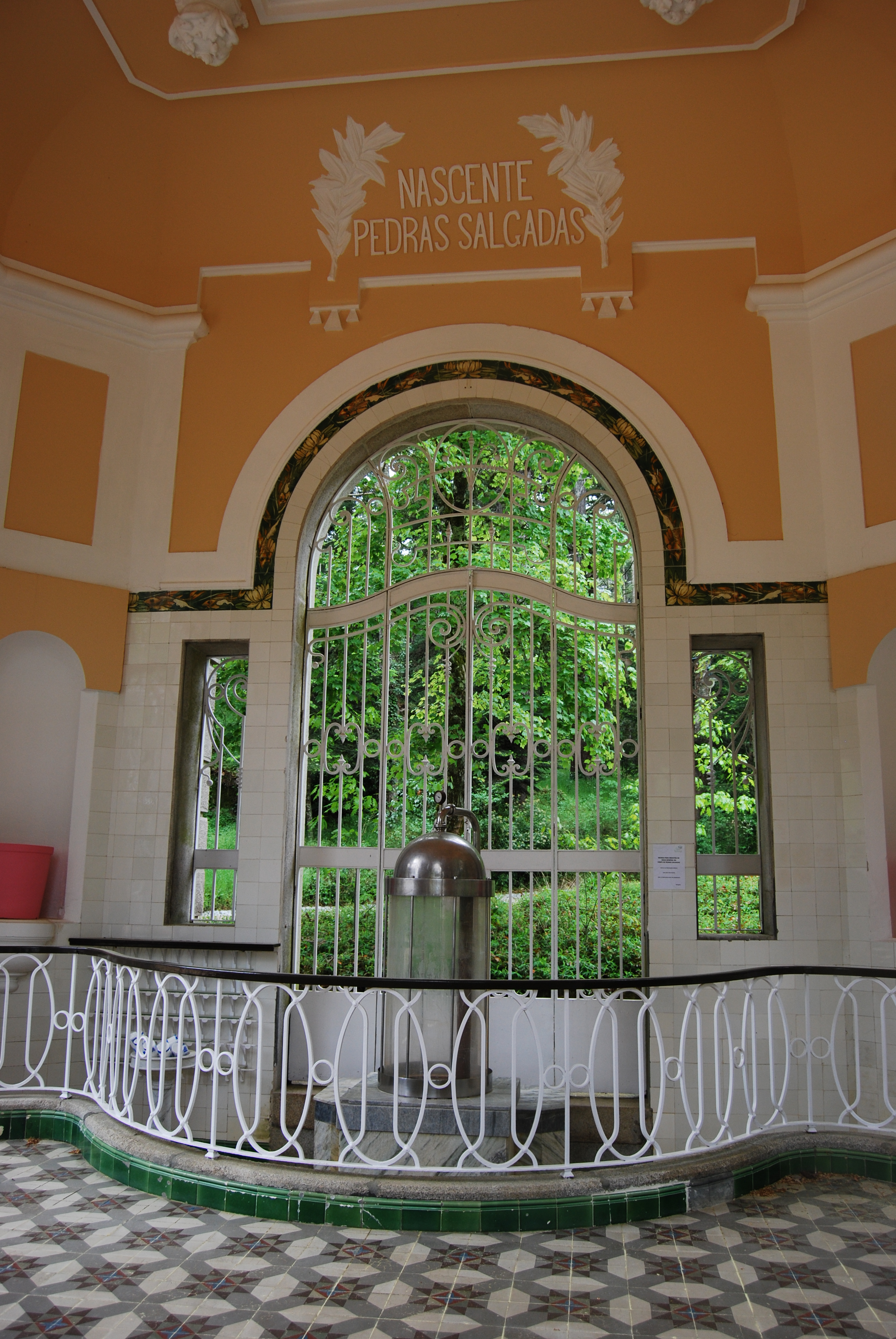
Nascente Pedras Salgadas (interior)

Pedras Salgadas (Portuguese pronunciation: [ˈpɛðɾɐʃ salˈɣaðɐʃ]) is a small spa town in the district of Vila Real, in Northern Portugal, located approximately 37 km north of the district capital of Vila Real. It is famous for its mineral waters. There are several small hotels in the area, which cater to tourists who want to relax in the green countryside and benefit from the spa facilities located there. In 2010, the Portuguese beer and water company Unicer opened a brand new spa complex in the town. Pedras Salgadas is situated in the municipality of Vila Pouca de Aguiar. Both are located on N2, the national road linking Chaves with Vila real. The new four-lane A24 highway passes a few kilometers west of the town and is connected by a feeder road. The railway was closed in the 1980s and the abandoned railway bed has now been paved for use as a cycling and walking path. This path extends to Vila Pouca de Aguiar, at a distance of about 10 kilometers.
