= Gouvães Dam =

- Location within Portugal
- Official name: Barragem de Gouvães
- Country: Portugal
- Location: municipality Vila Pouca de Aguiar, Vila Real District
- Coordinates: 41°29′39″N 7°43′38″W
- Purpose: Power
- Status: Operational
- Opening date: 2022

Dam and spillways
- Impounds: Torno River

Power Station
- Installed capacity: 880 MW (1,180,000 hp)
- Annual generation: 1468 Gwh

Gouvães Dam (Portuguese: Barragem de Gouvães) is a rockfield dam on the Torno River. It is located in the municipality Vila Pouca de Aguiar, in Vila Real District, Portugal and it is part of the wider Tâmega Electricity-Generating Group formed of three dams and three plants

Iberdrola signed a 70-year concession with the Government of Portugal in July 2014 for the design, construction and operation of three projects: Alto Tâmega, Daivões and Gouvães dams.

Construction of the dam completed in July 2022.

== Dam ==
Gouvães Dam is 35 metres (115 ft) tall.

== Reservoir ==
The reservoir surface area for the dam has 3.4 km^{2} (1.3 sq mi).

== Power plant ==
The generating unit of the dam consists of four 220MW reversible turbine units with a diameter of 3,500 mm (140 in) and speed of 600rpm and producing 1468 GWh of electricity a year.

The maximum discharge capacity of the spillway located on the left of Gouvães dam is of 67 m^{3}/s (2,400 cu ft/s). The dam also includes 6.5 km (4.0 mi) of tunnels along with a 750 metres (2,460 ft) shaft. The penstock is a concrete tunnel with a length of 4.7 km (2.9 mi) and diameter of 7.3 m (24 ft).

== See also ==
- List of power stations in Portugal
- List of dams and reservoirs in Portugal
