= Ribeira de Pena =

- Municipality
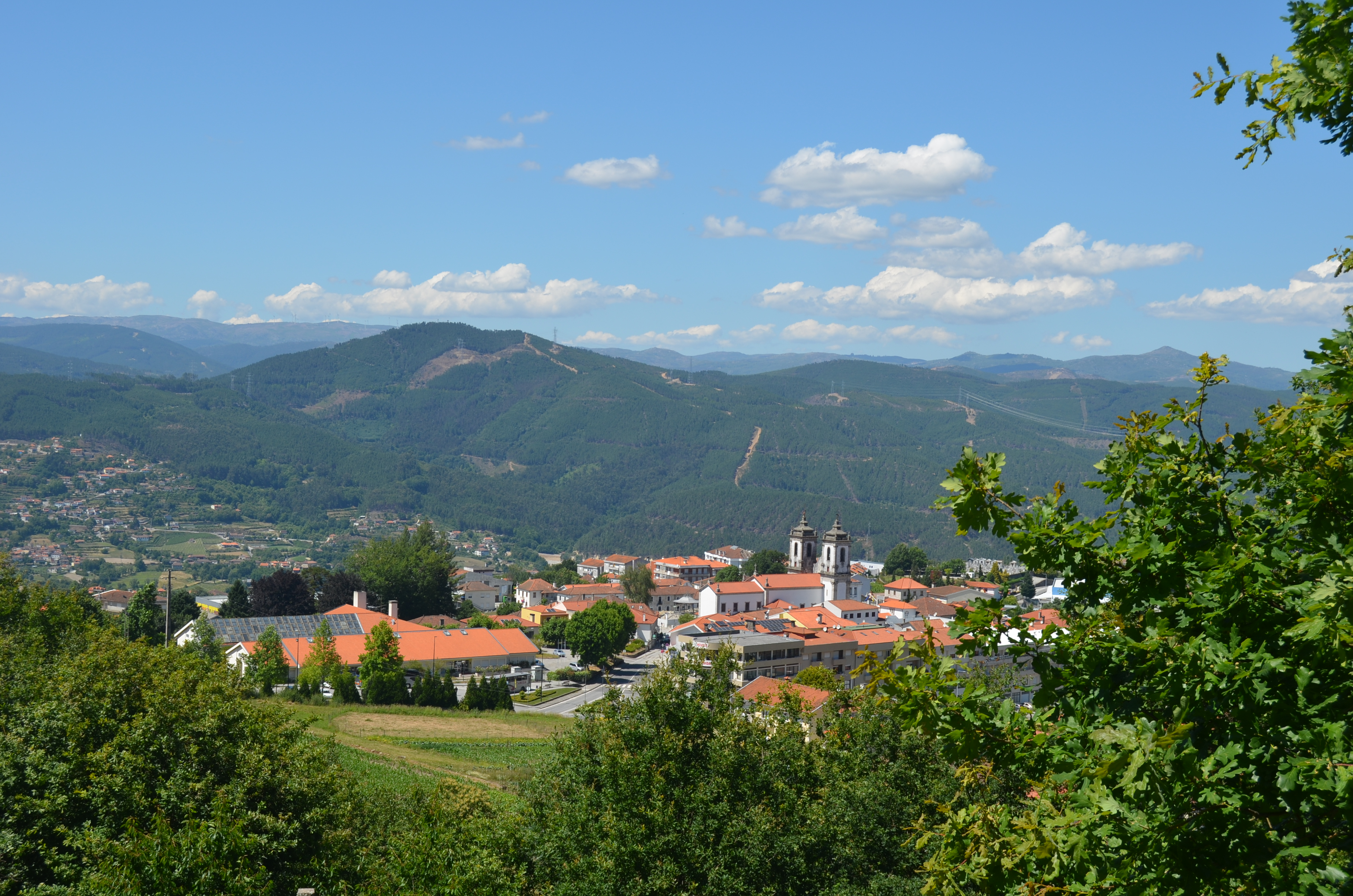
- Partial view of Ribeira de Pena

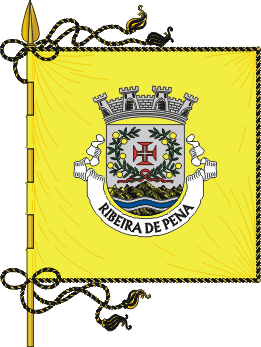
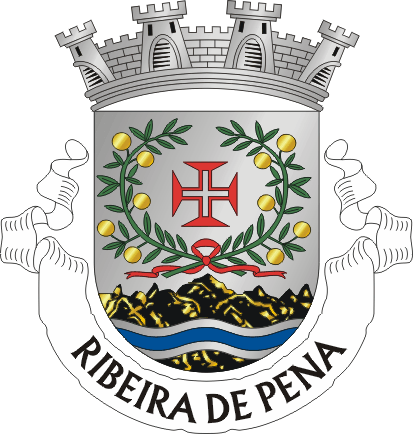
- Flag Coat of arms
- Interactive map of Ribeira de Pena
- Coordinates: 41°31′N 7°47′W
- Country: Portugal
- Region: Norte
- Intermunic. comm.: Alto Tâmega
- District: Vila Real
- Parishes: 5

Government
  - President: João Noronha (PS)

Area
  - Total: 217.46 km^{2} (83.96 sq mi)

Population (2024)
  - Total: 5,840
  - Density: 26.9/km^{2} (69.6/sq mi)
- Time zone: UTC+00:00 (WET)
  - Summer (DST): UTC+01:00 (WEST)
- Website: https://www.cm-rpena.pt

Ribeira de Pena (Portuguese pronunciation: [ʁiˈβɐjɾɐ ðɨ ˈpenɐ]) is a town and a municipality in the Vila Real District, in the North of Portugal. In 2024, the municipality had 5,840 inhabitants across an area of 217.46 square kilometres (83.96 mi^{2}). The town itself had approximately 2,608 inhabitants in 2021.

Located in a transitional zone between the Trás-os-Montes and the Minho, the municipality of Ribeira de Pena, crossed by the Tâmega River, displays characteristics and offers visitors the flavour of the region's "green wine." It contains historical artifacts, like the Stone Age engravings of Lamelas, several dolmens, and archaeological monuments and fortified settlements such as the ruins at Monte do Cabriz, near the village of Cerva.

The current mayor is João Noronha, elected in 2017 by PS. The municipal holiday is August 16.

There are two hydroelectric dams in Ribeira de Pena municipality, Daivões Dam and Alto Tâmega Dam. These, together with Gouvães Dam, form the Gigabattery of the Tâmega, a renewable energy storage project by Iberdrola.

== Parishes ==
Administratively, the municipality is divided into 5 civil parishes (freguesias):

- Alvadia
- Canedo
- Cerva e Limões
- Ribeira de Pena (Salvador) e Santo Aleixo de Além-Tâmega
- Santa Marinha

== Notable people ==
- Romário Cunha (born 2008) a footballer with 18 international youth caps.
- Arthur Gomes (born 1969) a former rugby player with 6 caps for France.
- Flávio Meireles (born 1976) a retired defensive midfield footballer with 327 club appearances.
