= Cerva e Limões =

- Civil parish
- Location in Portugal
- Coordinates: 41.46°N 7.84°W
- Country: Portugal
- Region: Norte
- Intermunic. comm.: Alto Tâmega
- District: Vila Real
- Municipality: Ribeira de Pena

Area
  - Total: 60.04 km^{2} (23.18 sq mi)

Population (2011)
  - Total: 2,615
  - Density: 44/km^{2} (110/sq mi)
- Time zone: UTC+00:00 (WET)
  - Summer (DST): UTC+01:00 (WEST)

Cerva e Limões is a civil parish in the municipality of Ribeira de Pena, Portugal. It was formed in 2013 by the merger of the former parishes Cerva and Limões. The population in 2011 was 2,615, in an area of 60.04 km^{2}.
