= Vila Real District =

District of Portugal

Coordinates: 41°17′46″N 7°44′46″W

District of Vila Real Distrito de Vila Real (Portuguese)
- District
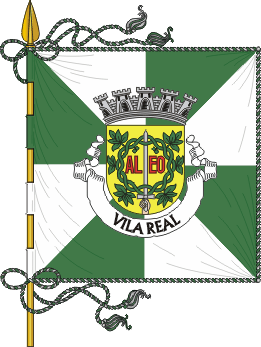
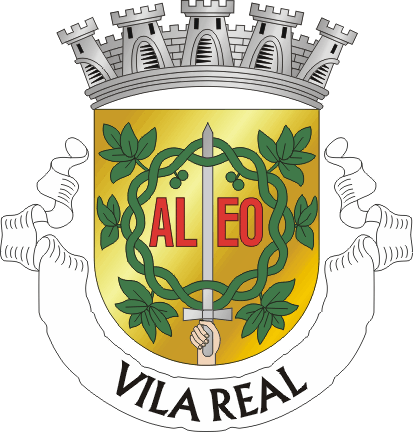
- Flag Coat of arms

- Country: Portugal
- Region: Norte
- Historical province: Trás-os-Montes e Alto Douro
- No. of municipalities: 14
- No. of parishes: 200
- Capital: Vila Real

Area
  - Total: 4,328 km^{2} (1,671 sq mi)

Population (2011)
  - Total: 206,661
  - Density: 47.75/km^{2} (123.7/sq mi)
- ISO 3166 code: PT-17
- No. of parliamentary representatives: 5

The District of Vila Real (Portuguese: Distrito de Vila Real [ˈvilɐ ʁiˈal]) is a district of northern Portugal. With an area of 4,239 km^{2} (1,637 sq mi), the district is located east of the port city of Porto and north of the Douro River. Vila Real has always belonged to the historical province of Trás-os-Montes. It is bordered by Spain (Galicia) in the north and east, Braga District and Porto District in the west, Viseu District in the south and Bragança District in the east.

Approximate population in the 2001 census was 230,000. The population has shown negative rates in recent years due to emigration and aging. Many of the villages have lost population and have become deserted, while the namesake district capital has gained in population.

== Geographic and socioeconomic characteristics ==
Vila Real is a rugged area of low mountains and narrow valleys. Historically it had always been cut off from the coast by the Marão, Gerês, and Cabreira mountains until a highway was cut through in the eighties. Due to poor soil, agriculture has always been a struggle, although wine grapes are produced in the south near the Douro River. Potatoes, corn, and rye have always been the traditional crops, as well as limited dairy farming. Extensive areas are covered in pine forest. Granite and the manufacture of mineral water—the waters of Vidago and Pedras Salgadas are nationally famous—are two important industries.

There was formerly a narrow gauge railway (the Corgo line) which linked the town of Vila Real with Peso da Régua on the Douro River. Until 1990 the railway reached as far north as Chaves. The remaining, southern part of the Corgo line closed in 2009.

== Population trends ==
The village of Urjais near Chaves

The largest towns are all very small, when compared to provincial capitals in neighboring Spain. When we talk about population of urban centers two figures are used in Portugal, one number for the concelho or municipality, which can be as large as 1,720.6 km^{2} (664.3 sq mi) (Odemira in the district of Beja) or as small as 8.11 km^{2} (3.13 sq mi) (São João da Madeira in the district of Aveiro), and another number for the main urban center itself. Often it is difficult to determine which parishes make up the urban center and which make up the rest of the concelho. Official census figures give populations of concelhos and not urban centers, so this can be misleading. Often the head of the municipality can be relatively small with most of the population residing in rural parishes. Chaves, for example has 12,000 in the urban parishes (2) and 29,000 in 49 rural parishes for a total municipality population of 41,000.

In order of population, Vila Real capital has roughly 25,000 in the urban parishes, Chaves 12,000, followed by Valpaços, Peso da Régua, and the other seats of concelhos, all of which have fewer than 10,000 inhabitants.

The population density of the district is sparse, 54 people per square kilometer. Most of this population lives in the concelhos of the south—Vila Real, Santa Marta, Régua, Sabrosa, and Alijó. The area between the district capital and the Douro river is especially more densely populated, with Régua having a population density of 212 per km^{2}, and Santa Marta with 128. There is a relatively populated area east of the capital. North the population clusters follow the Corgo river valley with many small villages on the river valley or veiga south of Vila Pouca. The geological fault linking Vila Pouca with Chaves is also quite populated. Then north and south of Chaves population density increases (68 per km^{2}). The area to the west—the Barroso—or to the east—Serra do Brunheiro is sparsely inhabited. Montalegre has a population density of 22 per km^{2}, although the number of small villages scattered across the area gives a different impression. A closer look shows that many of the houses are no longer lived in and many have been abandoned.

Much of this population still lives in villages, many of which have fewer than 100 inhabitants. Over seventy-five percent of the population in fact lives in centers with fewer than 5,000 people, which is the cutoff point for urbanization. If we take the total population of 230,000 in 1991 and single out the largest centers with more than 10,000 people—Chaves, and Vila Real—whose total population is under 30,000, we can see that over seventy five percent of the population is rural or semi-rural. This lack of middle-sized urban centers in the province is a reflection of the loss of population of the region as a whole over the last twenty years, due to lack of job possibilities. It also means that the Transmontano still has a rural lifestyle and all that this implies in cultural habits, including outlook towards education, innovation in business, and acceptance of different ideas.

== Municipalities ==
The district is composed of 14 municipalities:

- Alijó
- Boticas
- Chaves
- Mesão Frio
- Mondim de Basto
- Montalegre
- Murça
- Peso da Régua
- Ribeira de Pena
- Sabrosa
- Santa Marta de Penaguião
- Valpaços
- Vila Pouca de Aguiar
- Vila Real

== Summary of votes and seats won 1976-2022 ==
Summary of election results from Vila Real district, 1976-2022
Parties	%	S	%	S	%	S	%	S	%	S	%	S	%	S	%	S	%	S	%	S	%	S	%	S	%	S	%	S	%	S	%	S
Parties	1976		1979		1980		1983		1985		1987		1991		1995		1999		2002		2005		2009		2011		2015		2019		2022	
PS	26.3	2	24.8	2	22.8	1	32.3	2	23.0	2	20.3	1	26.0	2	40.0	2	40.8	2	31.9	2	43.8	3	36.1	2	29.1	2	33.1	2	37.2	2	41.3	3
PSD	39.0	4	In AD				42.0	3	42.2	3	62.5	5	60.6	4	46.0	3	45.5	3	54.1	3	40.2	2	41.1	3	51.4	3	In PàF		39.0	3	40.0	2
CDS-PP	18.3	1	In AD				12.7	1	12.5	1	5.0		5.1		7.8		6.8		8.1		6.8		10.1		8.7		In PàF		4.5		1.6	
AD			57.7	4	62.1	5																										
PàF																											51.0	3				
Total seats	7		6												5																	
Source: Comissão Nacional de Eleições

== See also ==
- Gontães, a village in the district of Vila Real
