= Albardo =

- Civil parish
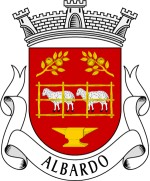
- Coat of arms

- Location in Portugal
- Coordinates: 40.510°N 7.131°W
- Country: Portugal
- Region: Centro
- Intermunic. comm.: Beiras e Serra da Estrela
- District: Guarda
- Municipality: Guarda

Area
  - Total: 4.05 km^{2} (1.56 sq mi)

Population (2011)
  - Total: 143
  - Density: 35/km^{2} (91/sq mi)
- Time zone: UTC+00:00 (WET)
  - Summer (DST): UTC+01:00 (WEST)

Albardo is a former civil parish in the municipality of Guarda. In 2013, the parish merged into the new parish Pousade e Albardo. The population in 2011 was 143, in an area of 4.05 km².

== History ==
The first constructions were probably created between the 12th and the 13th centuries, but for lack of official documents, it seems difficult to confirm it. It seems more probable than the village was an appendix of Vila Fernando, another village which is located at two kilometers of Albardo. It was a place where a great number of enclosure with sheep was; thereafter, people settled with more close, giving rise to the village and becoming completely autonomous starting from the 18th century.

== Geography ==
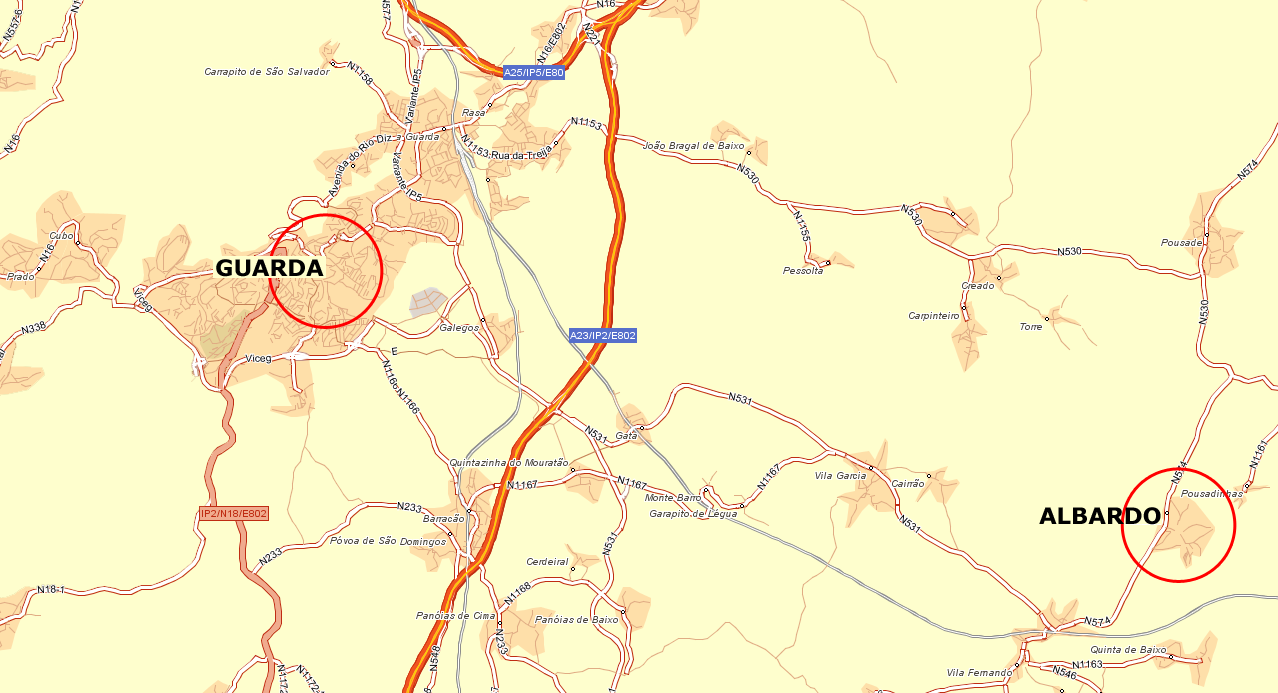
Plan albardo

Small village, located at 13 km of the town of Guarda. The population during the year, is less than 200 inhabitants, but can almost double at the time of the summer holidays. Primarily agricultural, there are small grocers, a primary school and some services of proximity. (has to supplement) Its situation on a hill with 800 meters of altitude, makes that the sight the top of the village includes a whole part of the landscape, making it possible to see the communes in the neighbourhoods; unfortunately for several years, this sight has been disfigured by the multiple fires, which generally occur the summer. The village, surrounded before by forests of oaks, chestnuts, pines and even of fig trees, which “drowned” the landscape, is today only one sight on valleys and hills shaven and sterile. But fortunately of the projects of afforestation financed by the government, the area and it European Union are in hand, which will give again has this area the green which colors the Portuguese flag.

== Inheritance ==
At the entry of the village, as in all the villages in Portugal, is a small martyrdom dedicated to Nossa Senhora dos Caminhos (Notre Dame of the Ways), holy protective of the village and travellers. By going up the street one finds, on the left another martyrdom representing a scene of the way of cross of Christ, further the place from the village or are the church and his bell-tower, the principal fountain, a laundrette, the first cemetery of the village and his very small and very beautiful mausoleum, a feeding trough and a splendid mulberry tree which, being slept on dimensioned was supported with a broad granite stone; the years passing the mulberry tree included part of this stone; there is also a village hall.

=== Gallery ===
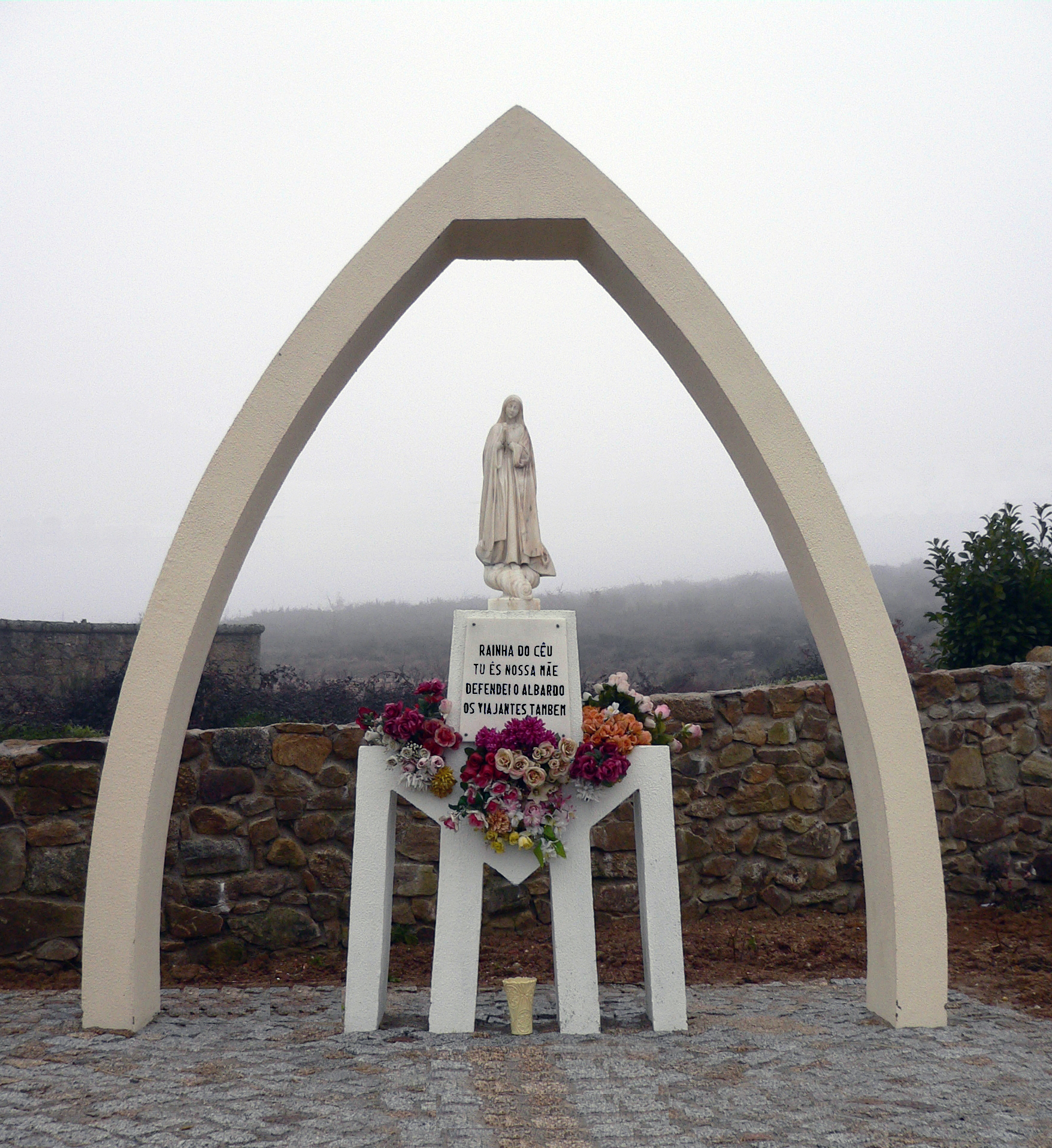
Notre Dame of the Ways

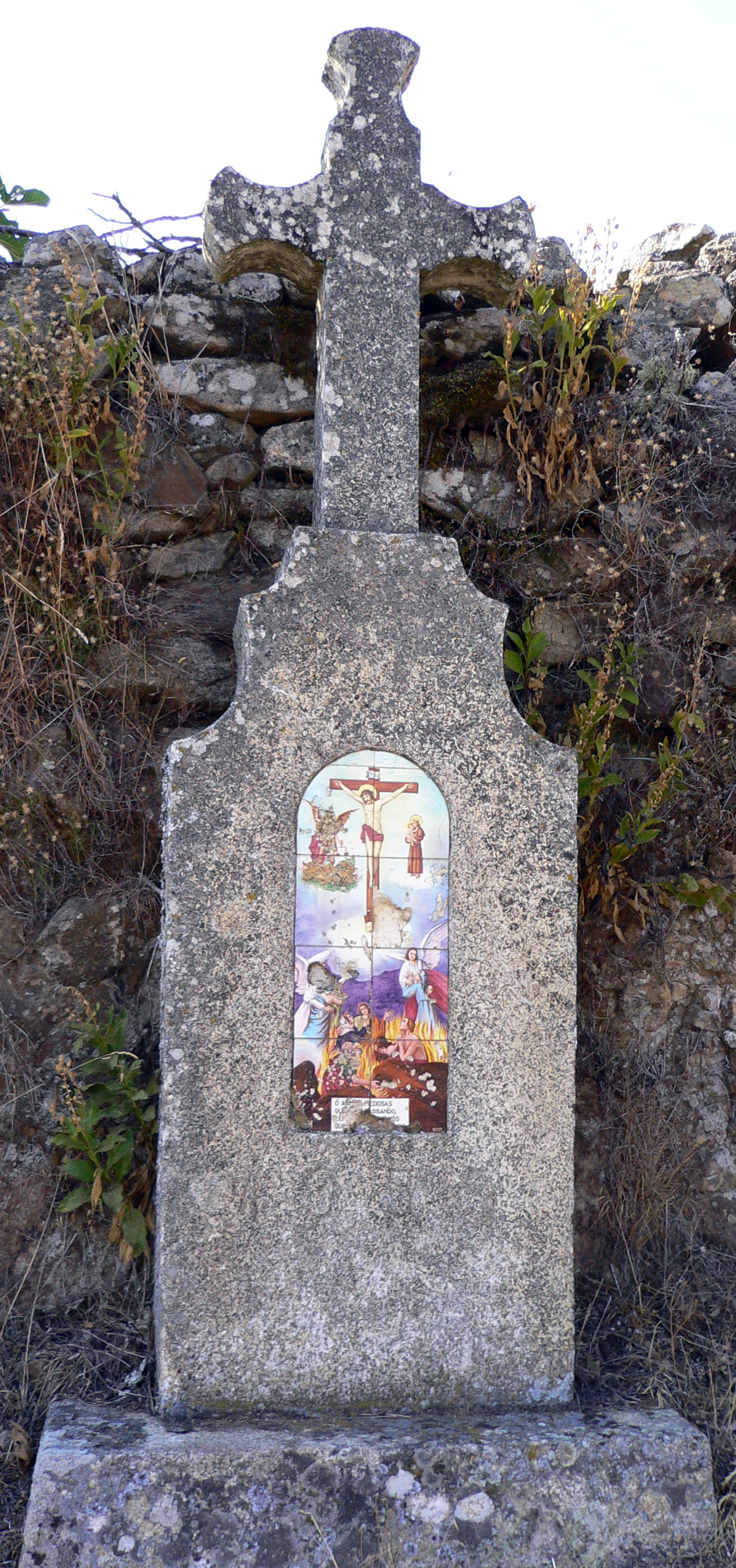
Martyrdom

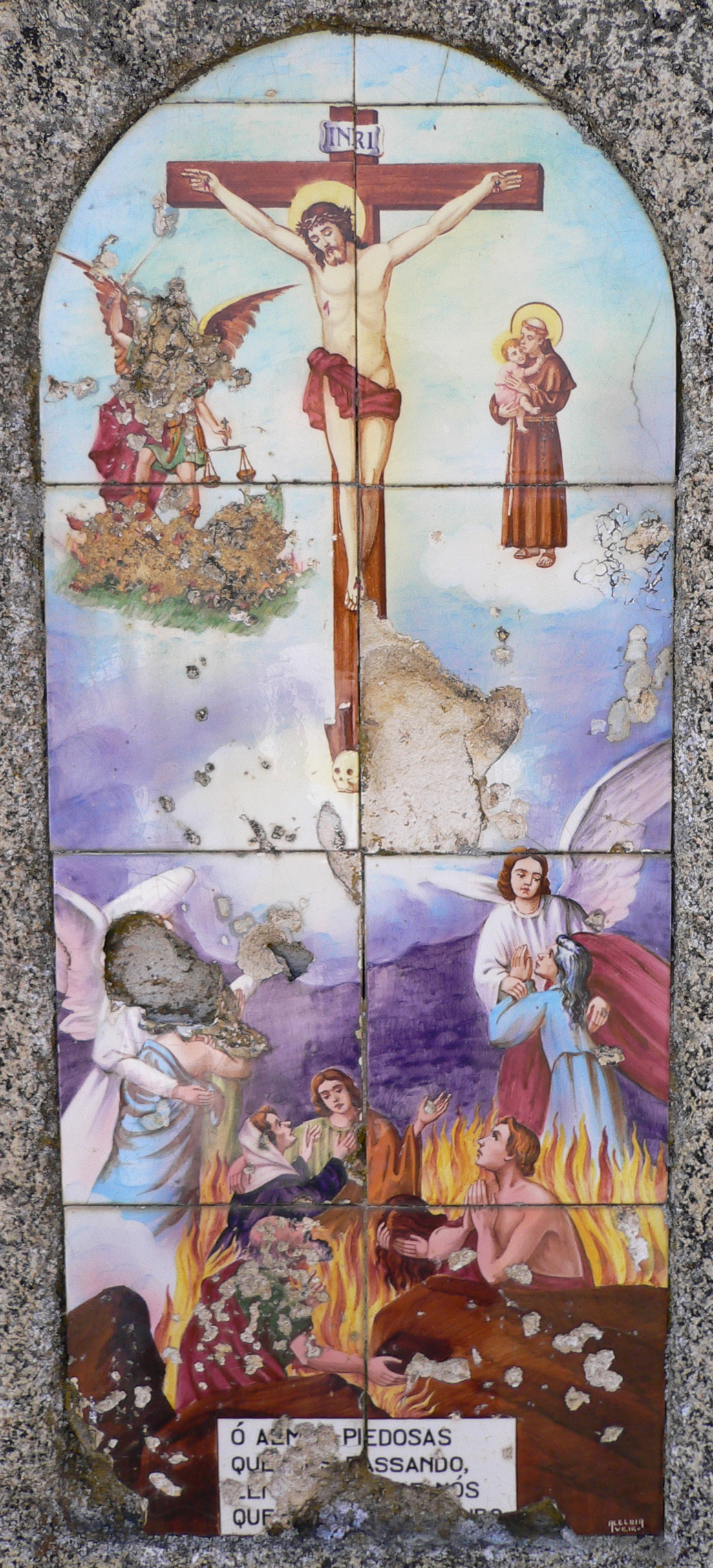
Detail of the Martyrdom

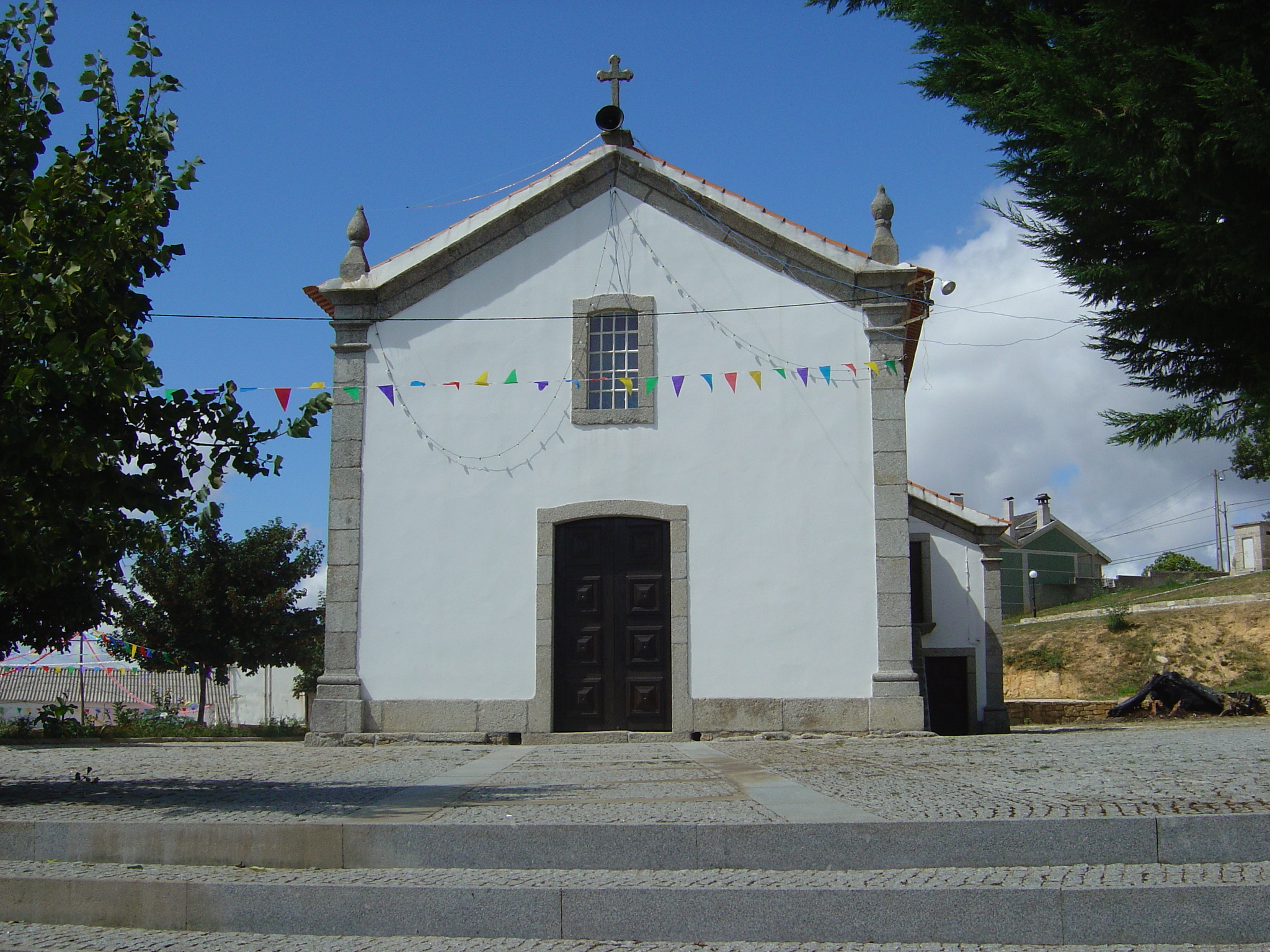
Church

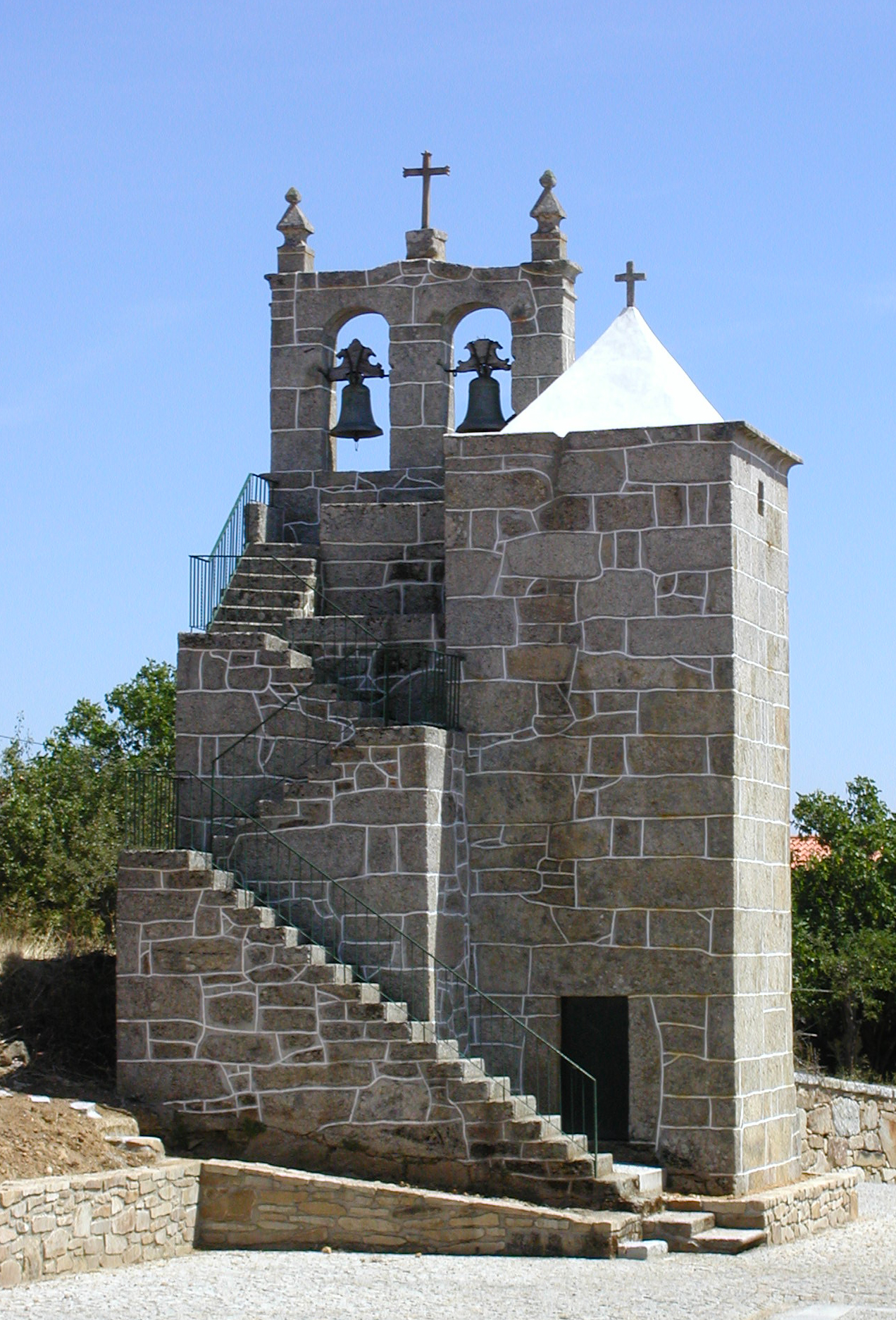
Bell-tower

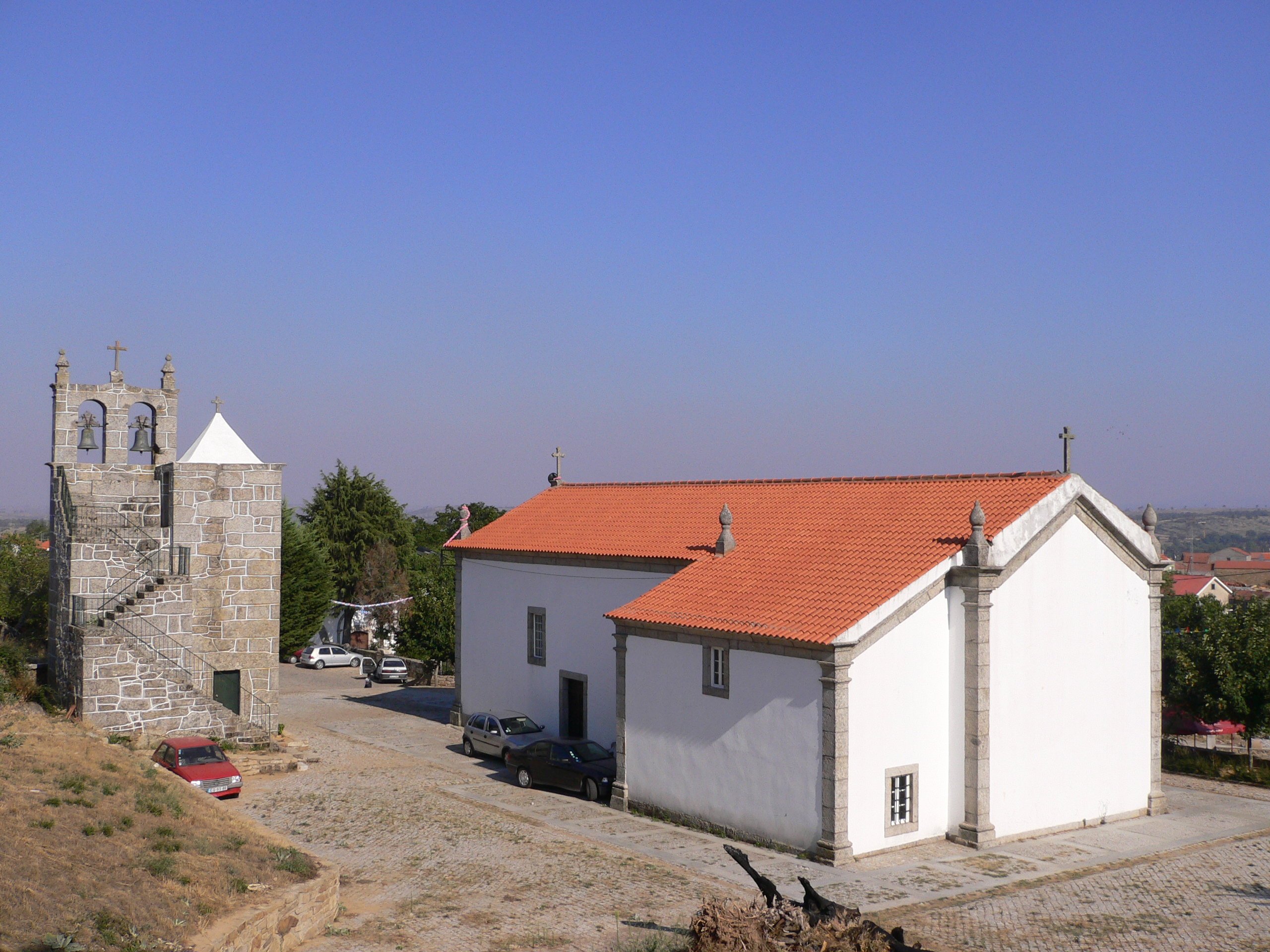
View of the church & the Bell-tower

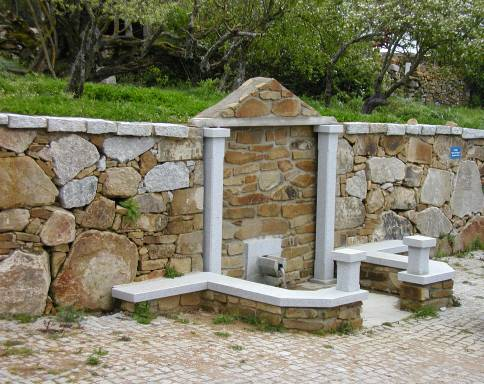
Fountain

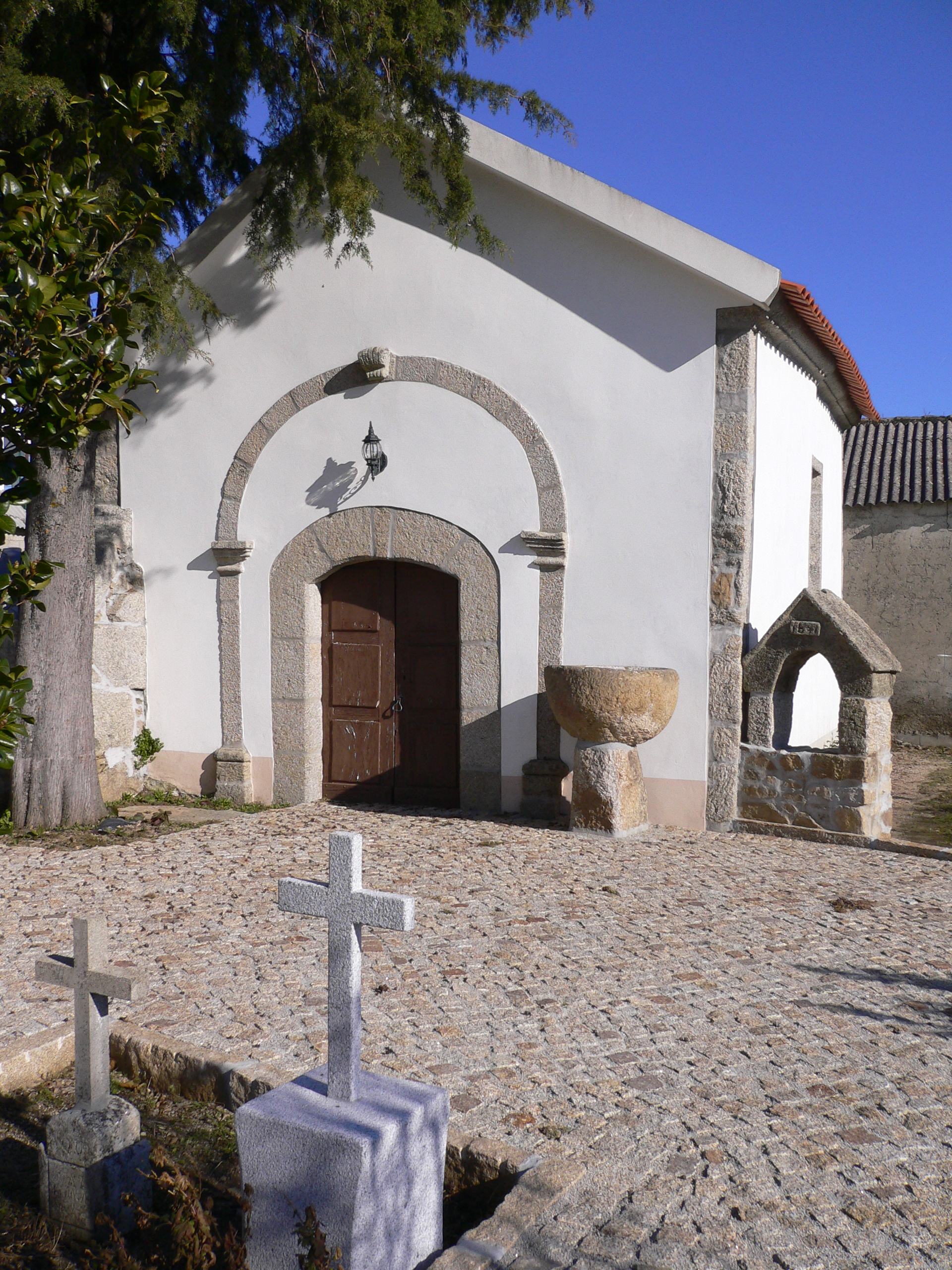
Mausoleum

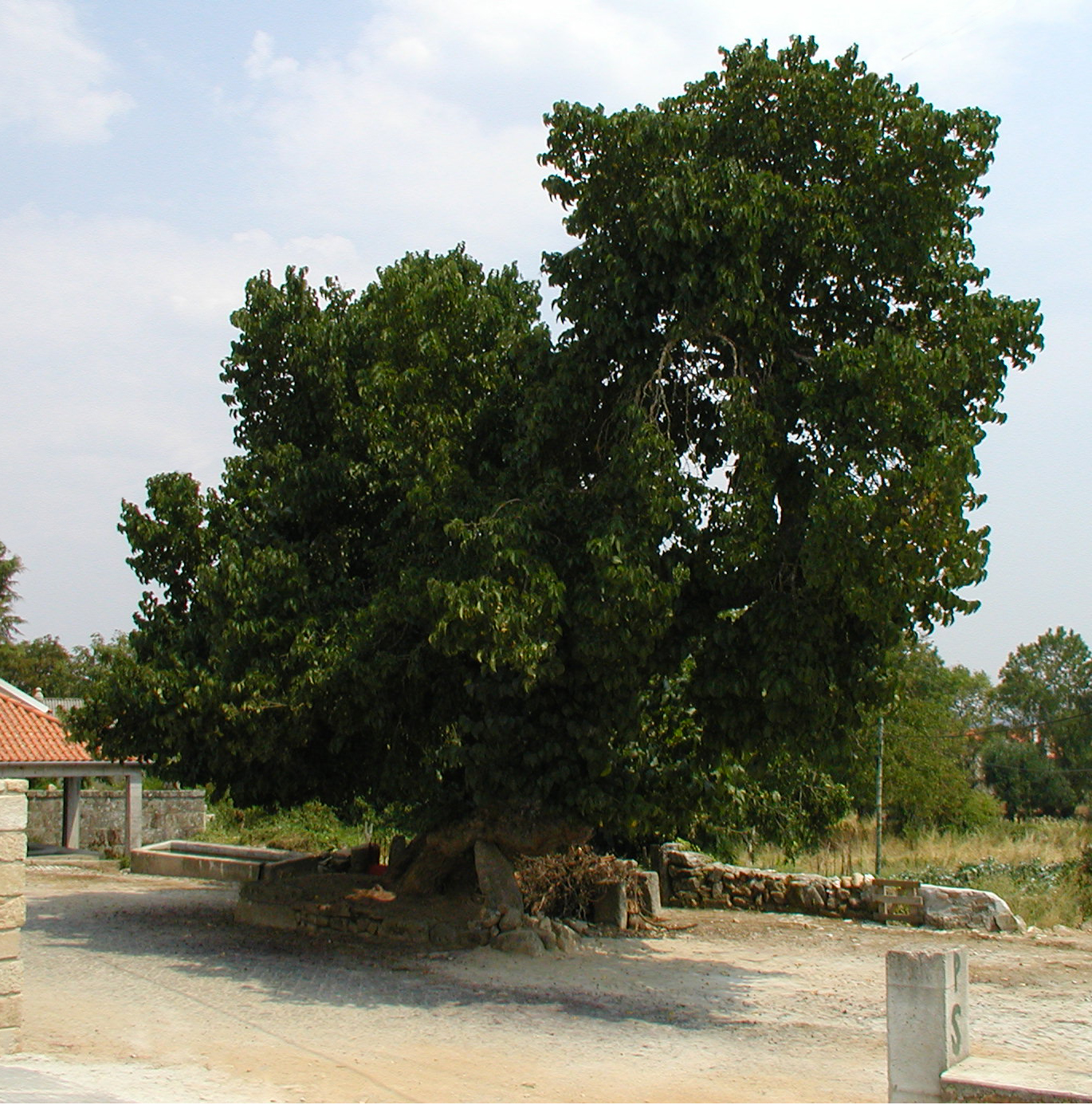
Mulberry tree

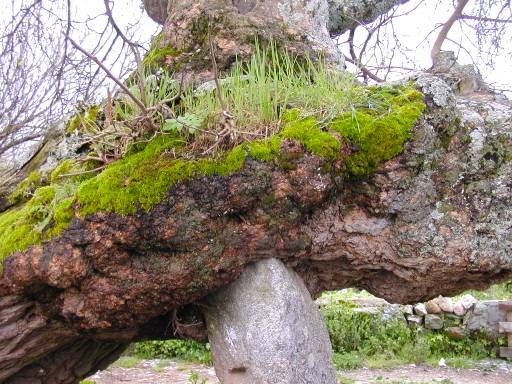
Stone in Mulberry tree

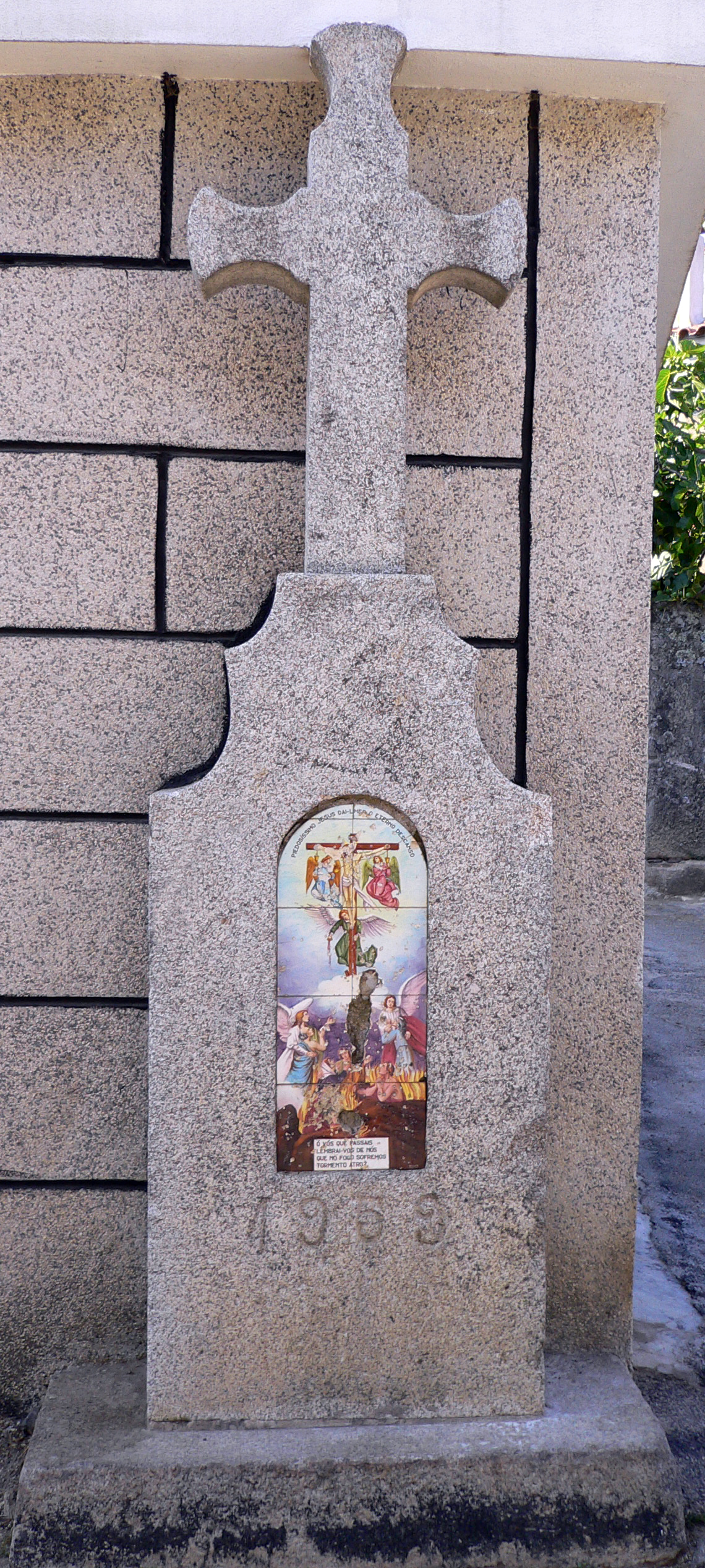
Martyrdom
