= Arrifana =

Arrifana may refer to one of several towns in Portugal:

- Arrifana (Aljezur)
- Arrifana (Guarda)
- Arrifana (Macedo de Cavaleiros)
- Arrifana (Santa Maria da Feira)
- Arrifana (Vila Nova de Poiares)
