= Lili Caneças =

Portuguese media personality (born 1944)

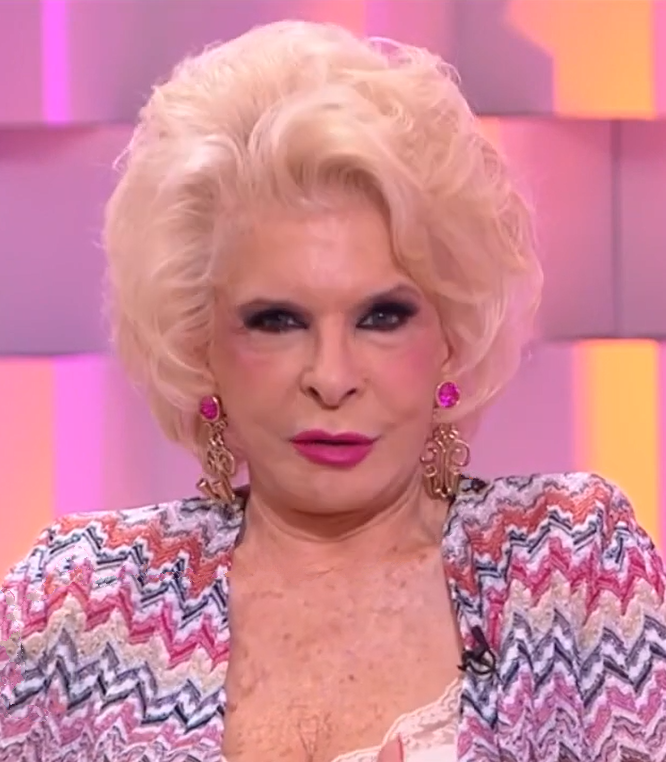
- Lili Caneças in 2024
- Born: Maria Alice de Carvalho Monteiro Custódio; 4 April 1944 (age 82); Guarda, Portugal
- Occupations: Socialite; television presenter
- Spouse: Álvaro Caneças (m. 1964; div. 1981)
- Children: 2
- Parent(s): Celeste Maria (mother); José Albano Custódio (father)

Lili Caneças (born Maria Alice de Carvalho Monteiro Custódio, 4 April 1944), is a Portuguese media personality and socialite known for her television career and participation in entertainment programs.

== Early life and education ==
Maria Alice de Carvalho Monteiro Custódio was born in Guarda, Portugal. The daughter of José Albano Custódio, an officer in the Portuguese Navy, she lived in Vila Franca de Xira and Peniche during her childhood. At 17, she enrolled in the Germanic Philology course at the University of Lisbon, which she left in her third year.

== Career ==
She began her television career in 1960 after winning a mask contest at Casino Estoril, interviewed by Henrique Mendes on RTP.

After her divorce in the 1980s, she worked in luxury real estate at her friend's agency.

She became a regular figure on SIC and TVI programming from the 2000s, standing out as a commentator on programs such as:

- O Bar da TV (2001-2003)
- Você na TV! (2004-2020)
- Em Família (2022-2023)

== Personal life ==
She married businessman Álvaro Caneças in 1964, divorcing in 1981. After the divorce, she faced financial difficulties.

== Parallel projects ==
- Published the biography Cinderela ao Contrário (2006) with Flávio Furtado
- Participated in the music video Calhambeque (2017) by the group Dois Brancos & Um Preto
