= Evelina Coelho =

Portuguese artist (1945–2013)

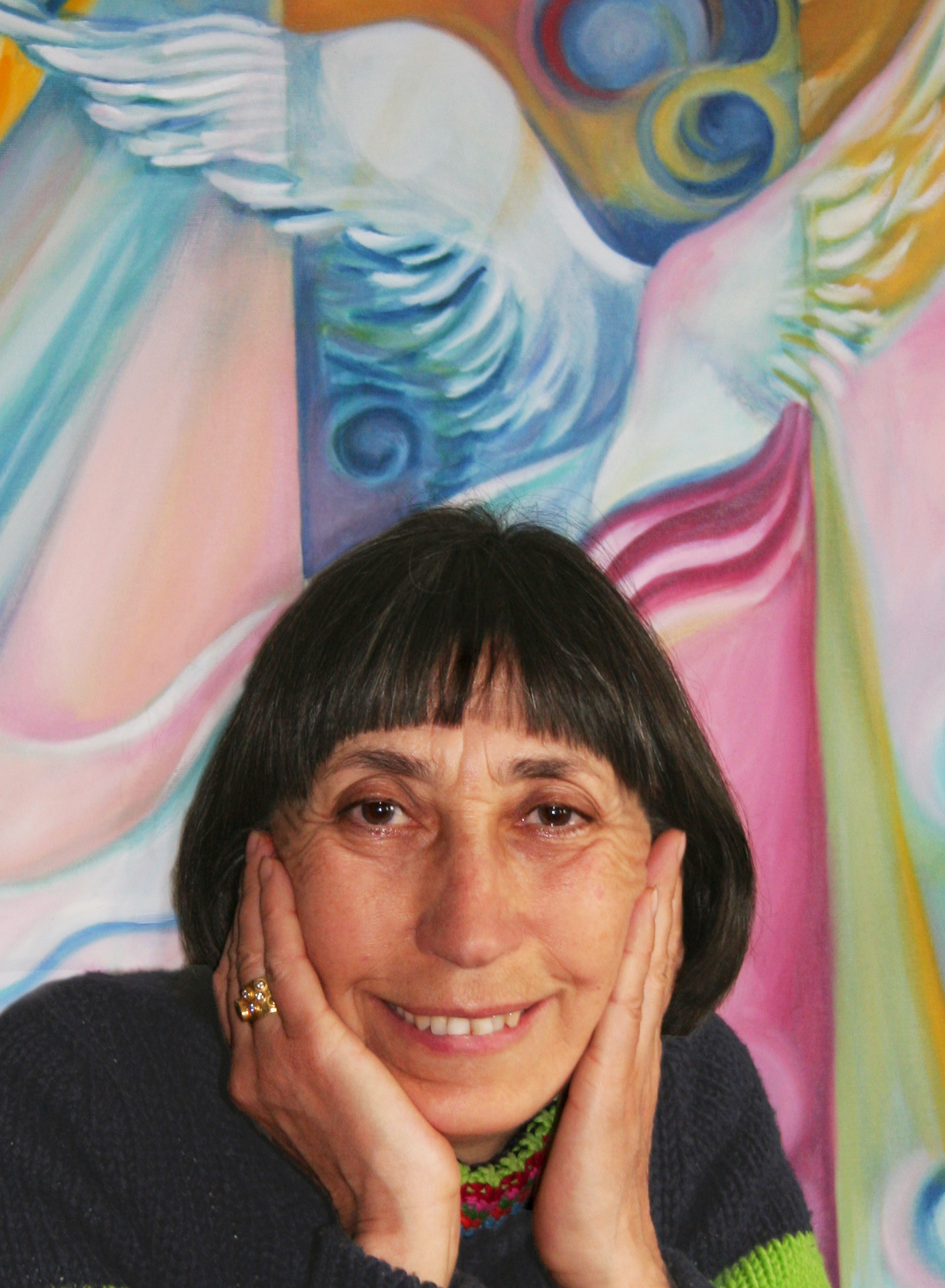
Evelina Coelho with one of her paintings

Maria Evelina Coelho Martins da Fonseca (23 May 1945 – 26 November 2013), whose artistic name was Evelina Coelho, was a Portuguese painter, from Vila Fernando, Guarda, Portugal.

== Biographical notes ==
She was born in Vila Fernando, Guarda, Portugal, and she died when 68 years old in Guarda, Portugal.

She graduated in painting from the Escola Superior de Belas Artes de Lisboa Escola Superior de Belas-Artes de Lisboa.

== Career ==
Coelho had more than two hundred exhibitions, in Portugal, Spain (Ciudad Rodrigo, Barcelona, San Sebastian and Salamanca), France (Paris, Bayonne, Riom, Orléans, Puy, Vicky, Clermont-Ferrand, Langeac, Béziers, Cherbourg and Vittel), Switzerland (Montreaux), Germany (Siegbourg), Canada (Quebec), and in São Paulo, Brazil.

She was awarded in Belgium by the European Foundation with the grade of Comendadora e Grande Oficial. She won Ganhou uma honourable mention in Béziers, Barcelona and Évora, a bronze medal in Barcelona and received the medal of merit of the city of Guarda, in Portugal. She illustrated several books and was the author of the symbol of the Instituto Politécnico da Guarda and the symbol of the Douro e Neve newspaper. She has works of art in museums, city councils, Banks, Churches, Chapels and in private collections worldwide.

Since 1 June 2012 she was the patroness of the Evelina Coelho Library in Vale de Mondego, Guarda, Portugal.

On the second anniversary of her death, on 26 November 2015, the Parishes of Fernão Joanes, Famalicão and Vale de Estrela, in Portugal, created the Rota da Pintura Religiosa de Evelina Coelho called the Cores do Sagrado.
