= Pousade e Albardo =

- Civil parish
- Location in Portugal
- Coordinates: 40.53°N 7.13°W
- Country: Portugal
- Region: Centro
- Intermunic. comm.: Beiras e Serra da Estrela
- District: Guarda
- Municipality: Guarda

Area
  - Total: 16.89 km^{2} (6.52 sq mi)

Population (2011)
  - Total: 270
  - Density: 16/km^{2} (41/sq mi)
- Time zone: UTC+00:00 (WET)
  - Summer (DST): UTC+01:00 (WEST)

Pousade e Albardo is a civil parish in the municipality of Guarda, Portugal. It was formed in 2013 by the merger of the former parishes Pousade and Albardo. The population in 2011 was 270, in an area of 16.89 km^{2}.
