= Aldeia Viçosa, Portugal =

Aldeia Viçosa
- Civil parish
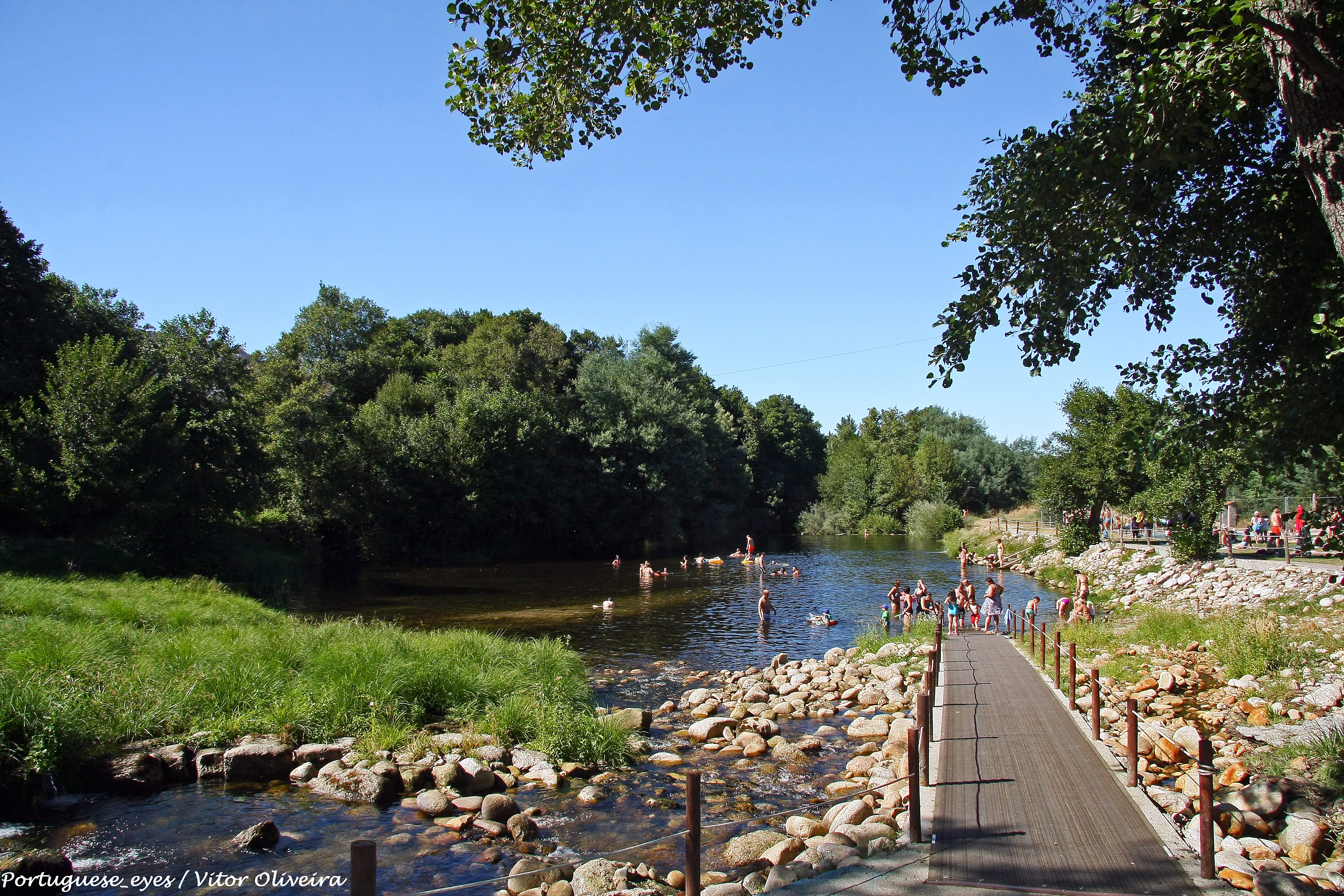
- Aldeia Viçosa river beach

- Location in Portugal
- Coordinates: 40.582°N 7.320°W
- Country: Portugal
- Region: Beiras e Serra da Estrela
- Intermunic. comm.: Alto Minho
- District: Guarda District
- Municipality: Guarda

Area
  - Total: 7.44 km^{2} (2.87 sq mi)

Population (2021)
  - Total: 267
  - Density: 35.9/km^{2} (92.9/sq mi)
- Time zone: UTC+00:00 (WET)
  - Summer (DST): UTC+01:00 (WEST)
- Website: www.jf-aldeiavicosa.pt

Aldeia Viçosa is a Portuguese village, seat of the Parish of Aldeia Viçosa in the Municipality of Guarda, a parish with an area of 7.44 km^{2} and 267 inhabitants (2021 census).

Formerly known as Porco, it acquired the new name on January 25, 1939.

The villages of Aldeia Viçosa and Soida belong to this parish.

== Twin towns ==
Aldeia Viçosa is twinned with:

- Saint-Fraimbault, France, since 1973
