= Saint-Fraimbault =

- Commune
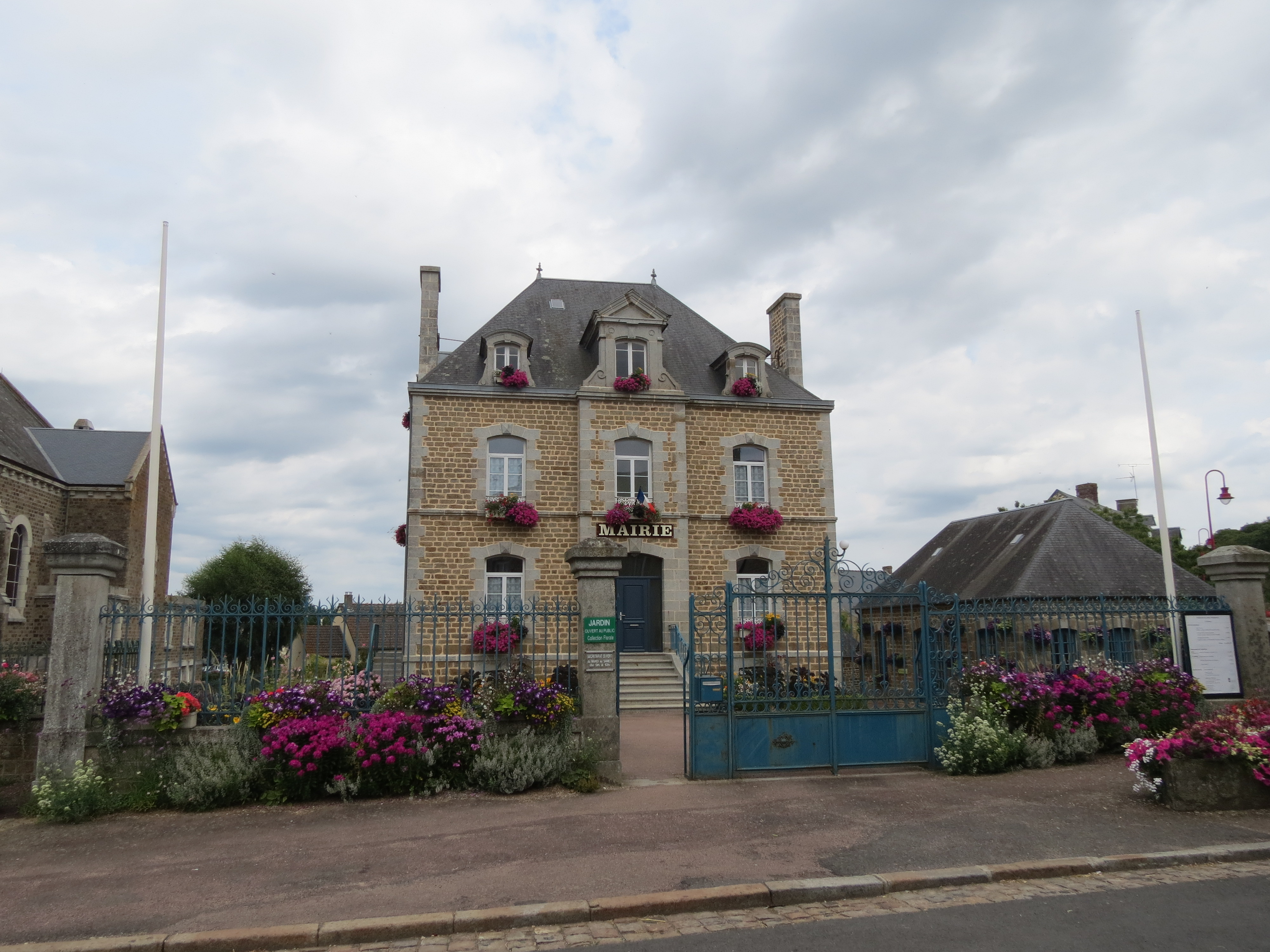
- The town hall in Saint-Fraimbault
- Location of Saint-Fraimbault
- Location within France Location within Normandy
- Coordinates: 48°29′14″N 0°41′54″W
- Country: France
- Region: Normandy
- Department: Orne
- Arrondissement: Alençon
- Canton: Bagnoles de l'Orne Normandie

Government
  - Mayor (2020–2026): Éric Leroux
- Area^{1}: 28.59 km^{2} (11.04 sq mi)
- Elevation: 150 m (490 ft)
- Highest elevation: 196 m (643 ft)
- Lowest elevation: 107 m (351 ft)
- Population (2023): 545
  - Density: 19.1/km^{2} (49.4/sq mi)
- Time zone: UTC+01:00 (CET)
  - Summer (DST): UTC+02:00 (CEST)
- INSEE/Postal code: 61387 /61350
- ^{1} French Land Register data, which excludes lakes, ponds, glaciers > 1 km^{2} (0.386 sq mi or 247 acres) and river estuaries.

Saint-Fraimbault (French pronunciation: [sɛ̃ fʁɛ̃bo], before 1962: Saint-Fraimbault-sur-Pisse) is a commune in the Orne department in north-western France. The town is named after the 6th-century AD Saint Fraimbault de Lassay (also known as Fraimbaud, Fraimbourg, Frambaud, Frambourg, Frambour, Frambaldus, etc.).

== Geography ==
The commune is made up of the following collection of villages and hamlets, Mémantel, Les Crivannières, Le Grand Bois, La Poulardière, La Besnardais, Saint-Fraimbault and L'Orière.

The river Varenne flows through the commune.

The commune is in the Normandie-Maine Regional Natural Park.

=== Climate ===
Saint-Fraimbault benefits from an oceanic climate with mild winters and temperate summers.

Climate data for Saint-Fraimbault (1994–2020 normals, extremes 1994–2024)
Month	Jan	Feb	Mar	Apr	May	Jun	Jul	Aug	Sep	Oct	Nov	Dec	Year
Record high °C (°F)	14.5 (58.1)	20.2 (68.4)	23.8 (74.8)	28.2 (82.8)	30 (86)	37.7 (99.9)	38.2 (100.8)	37.9 (100.2)	33.4 (92.1)	28.8 (83.8)	20.4 (68.7)	15.5 (59.9)	38.2 (100.8)
Mean daily maximum °C (°F)	7.5 (45.5)	8.7 (47.7)	11.6 (52.9)	15 (59)	18.1 (64.6)	21.5 (70.7)	23.7 (74.7)	23.6 (74.5)	20.6 (69.1)	16.1 (61.0)	11.1 (52.0)	8 (46)	15.5 (59.9)
Daily mean °C (°F)	4.8 (40.6)	5.4 (41.7)	7.5 (45.5)	10 (50)	13.3 (55.9)	16.4 (61.5)	18.2 (64.8)	18.1 (64.6)	15.3 (59.5)	12.2 (54.0)	8.1 (46.6)	5.3 (41.5)	11.2 (52.2)
Mean daily minimum °C (°F)	2.1 (35.8)	2.1 (35.8)	3.4 (38.1)	5.1 (41.2)	8.4 (47.1)	11.2 (52.2)	12.7 (54.9)	12.6 (54.7)	10 (50)	8.3 (46.9)	5 (41)	2.6 (36.7)	7 (45)
Record low °C (°F)	−13.6 (7.5)	−11 (12)	−8.1 (17.4)	−4.2 (24.4)	−1.1 (30.0)	2 (36)	5.2 (41.4)	4.3 (39.7)	1.4 (34.5)	−5 (23)	−6.5 (20.3)	−11.3 (11.7)	−13.6 (7.5)
Average precipitation mm (inches)	86.3 (3.40)	71 (2.8)	63.9 (2.52)	57.7 (2.27)	65.2 (2.57)	51.9 (2.04)	63.3 (2.49)	57.4 (2.26)	62.3 (2.45)	82.6 (3.25)	87.3 (3.44)	101.2 (3.98)	850.1 (33.47)
Average precipitation days (≥ 1.0 mm)	14.5	12.4	11.3	10.4	10.3	8.4	8.4	9.1	9.1	12.2	13.7	15.1	134.8
Source: Meteociel

== Points of Interest ==
- Plan d'eau de Saint-Fraimbault is a 2 Hectare lake, used for leisure activities and surrounded by parkland.

== Notable people ==
- Marie-Chantal Depetris-Demaille - (born 1941) is a French foil fencer who was born here.

== Twin towns ==
Saint-Fraimbault is twinned with:

- Aldeia Viçosa, Portugal, since 1973

== See also ==
- Communes of the Orne department
- Parc naturel régional Normandie-Maine
