= Augusto Gil =

Portuguese lawyer and poet (1873–1929)

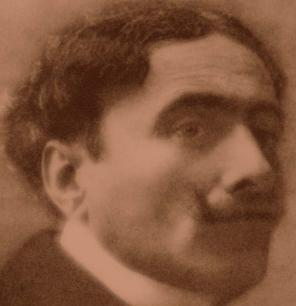
- Born: 31 July 1873; Porto, Portugal
- Died: 26 November 1929 (aged 56); Guarda, Portugal
- Occupations: Lawyer and poet

Augusto César Ferreira Gil was a Portuguese lawyer and poet.

He was born on 31 July 1873 in Porto, and died on 26 November 1929 in Guarda. Gil's literary works combined Symbolist verse with satire and simple lyricism, though his focus on nature and poverty as subjects also made him a precursor of Portuguese Neo-Realism.

He wrote Balada da Neve, a well-known poem among Portuguese poets.

Gil has a section of the Museu de Garda dedicated to his life and works, in his home city of Guarda.

== Published Poetry Collections ==
- 1894 Musa Cérula
- 1898 Versos
- 1909 Luar de Janeiro
- 1909 Balada da Neve
- 1910 O Canto da Cigarra
- 1915 Sombra de Fumo
- 1920 O Craveiro da Janela
- 1927 Avena Rústica
- 1930 Rosas desta Manhã
