= Castle of Guarda =

Portuguese castle

Coordinates: 40°32′15″N 7°16′18″W

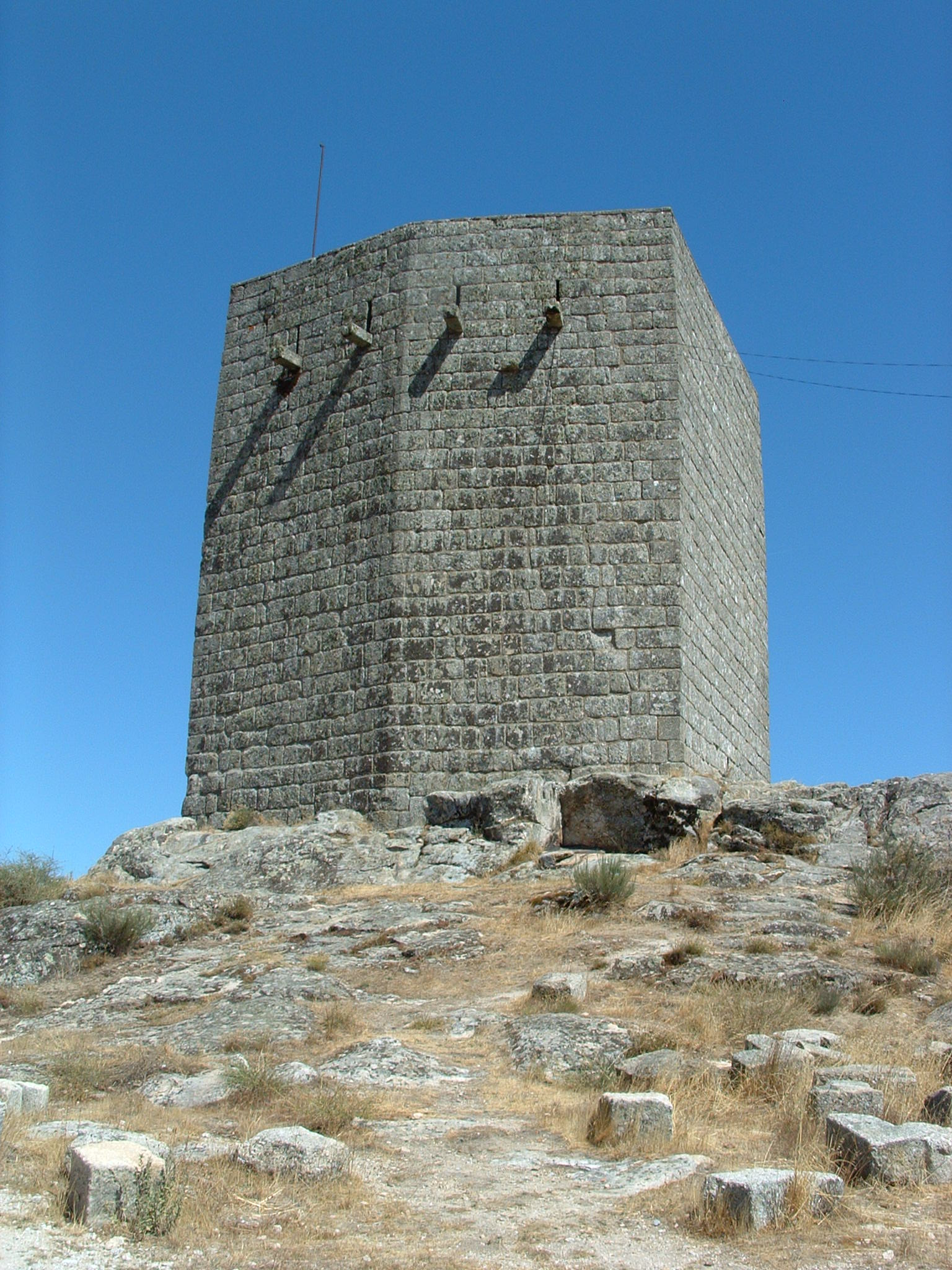
Old Keep

The Castle of Guarda (Portuguese: Castelo da Guarda) is a medieval castle in the civil parish of Guarda, municipality of Guarda, the Portuguese district of the same name.

It is classified as a National Monument of Portugal.
