= Arrifana (Guarda) =

- Civil parish
- Location in Portugal
- Coordinates: 40.570°N 7.210°W
- Country: Portugal
- Region: Centro
- Intermunic. comm.: Beiras e Serra da Estrela
- District: Guarda
- Municipality: Guarda

Area
  - Total: 15.82 km^{2} (6.11 sq mi)

Population (2011)
  - Total: 661
  - Density: 42/km^{2} (110/sq mi)
- Time zone: UTC+00:00 (WET)
  - Summer (DST): UTC+01:00 (WEST)

Arrifana (Portuguese pronunciation: [ɐʁiˈfɐnɐ]) is a civil parish in the municipality of Guarda, Portugal. The population in 2011 was 661, in an area of 15.82 km^{2}.
