= Guarda, Portugal =

Municipality in the centre of Portugal

Guarda
- Municipality
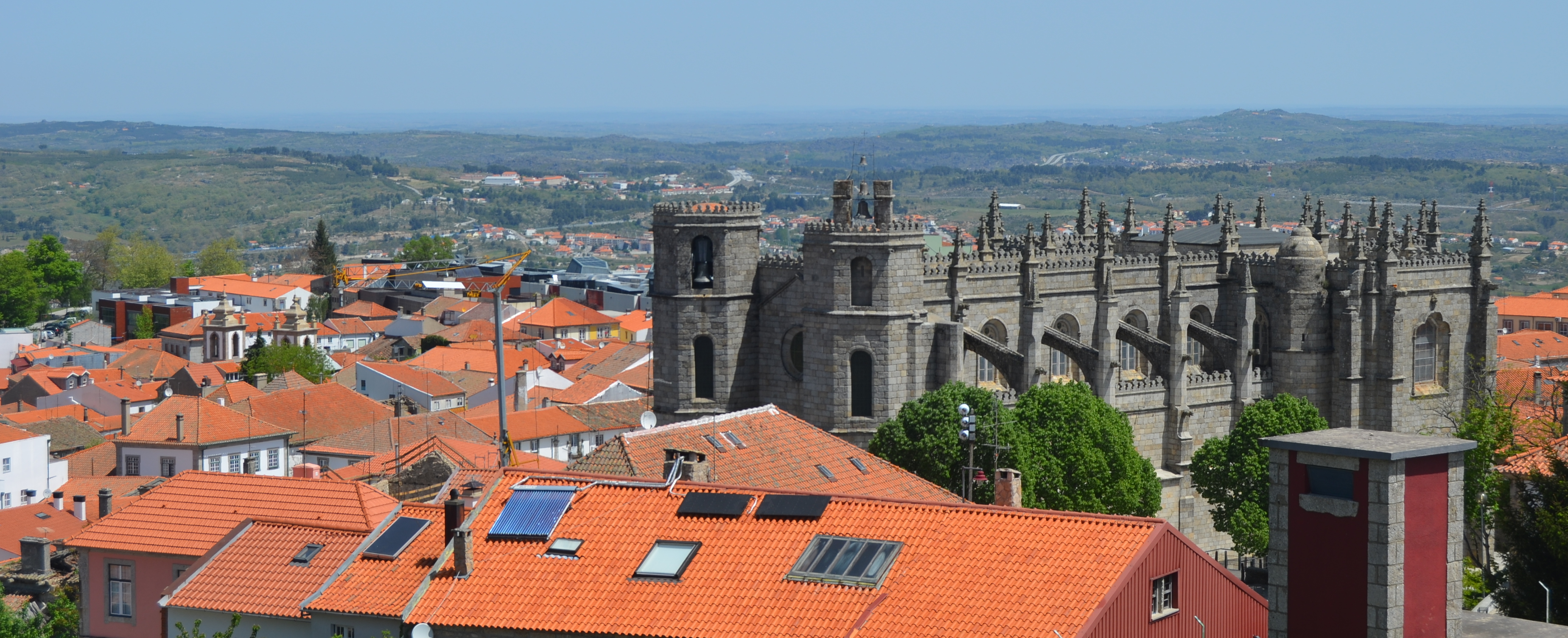
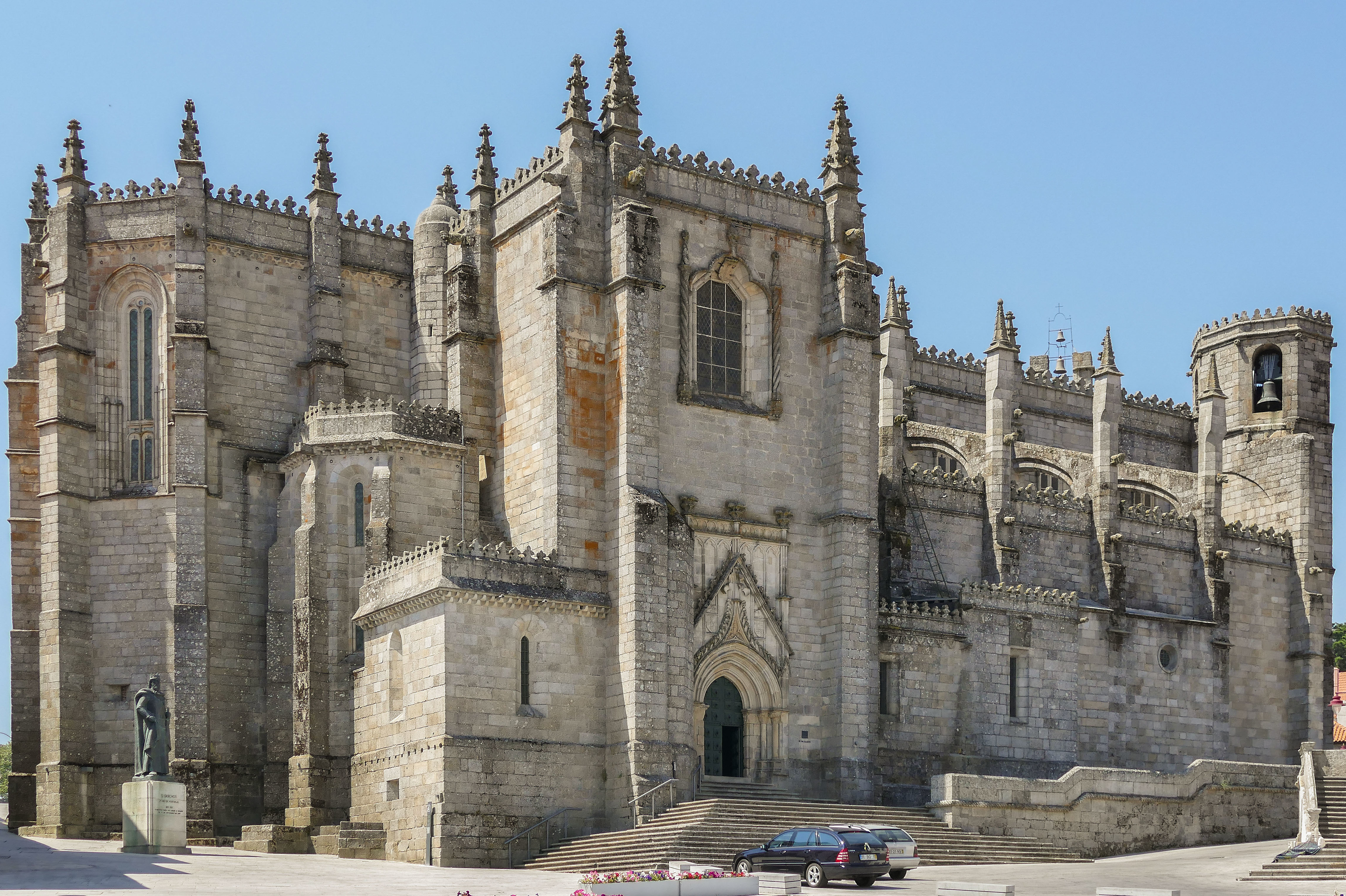
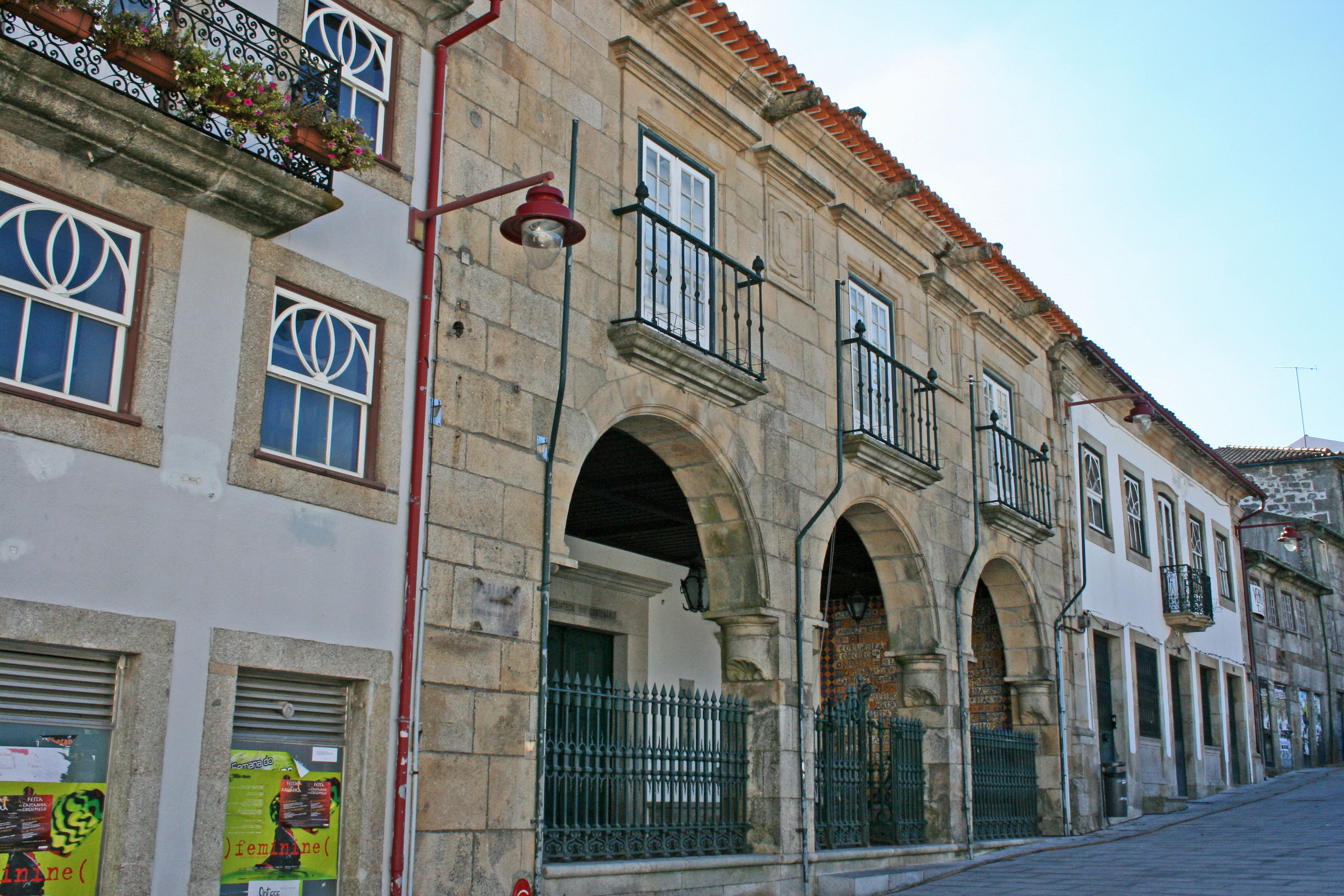
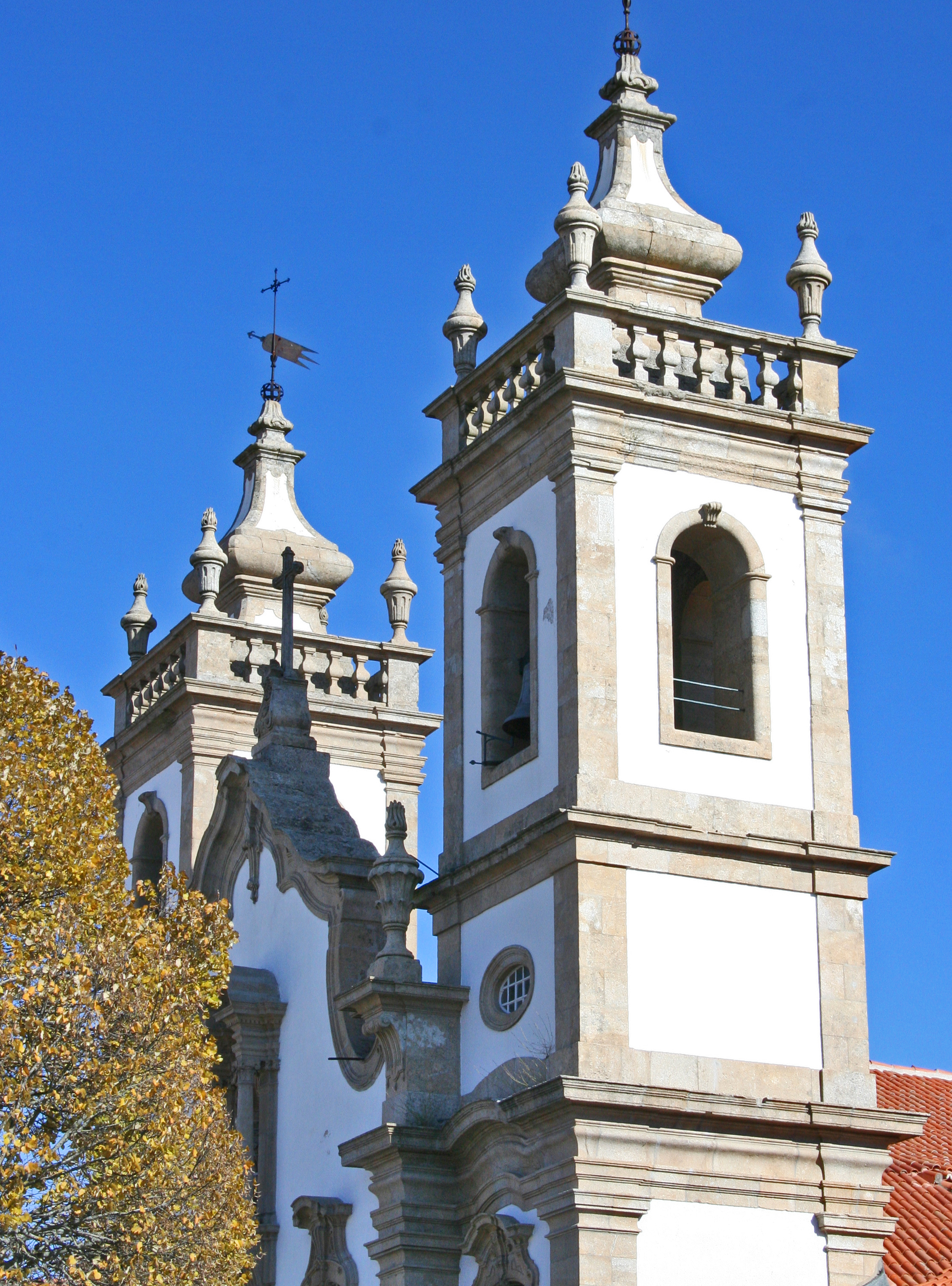
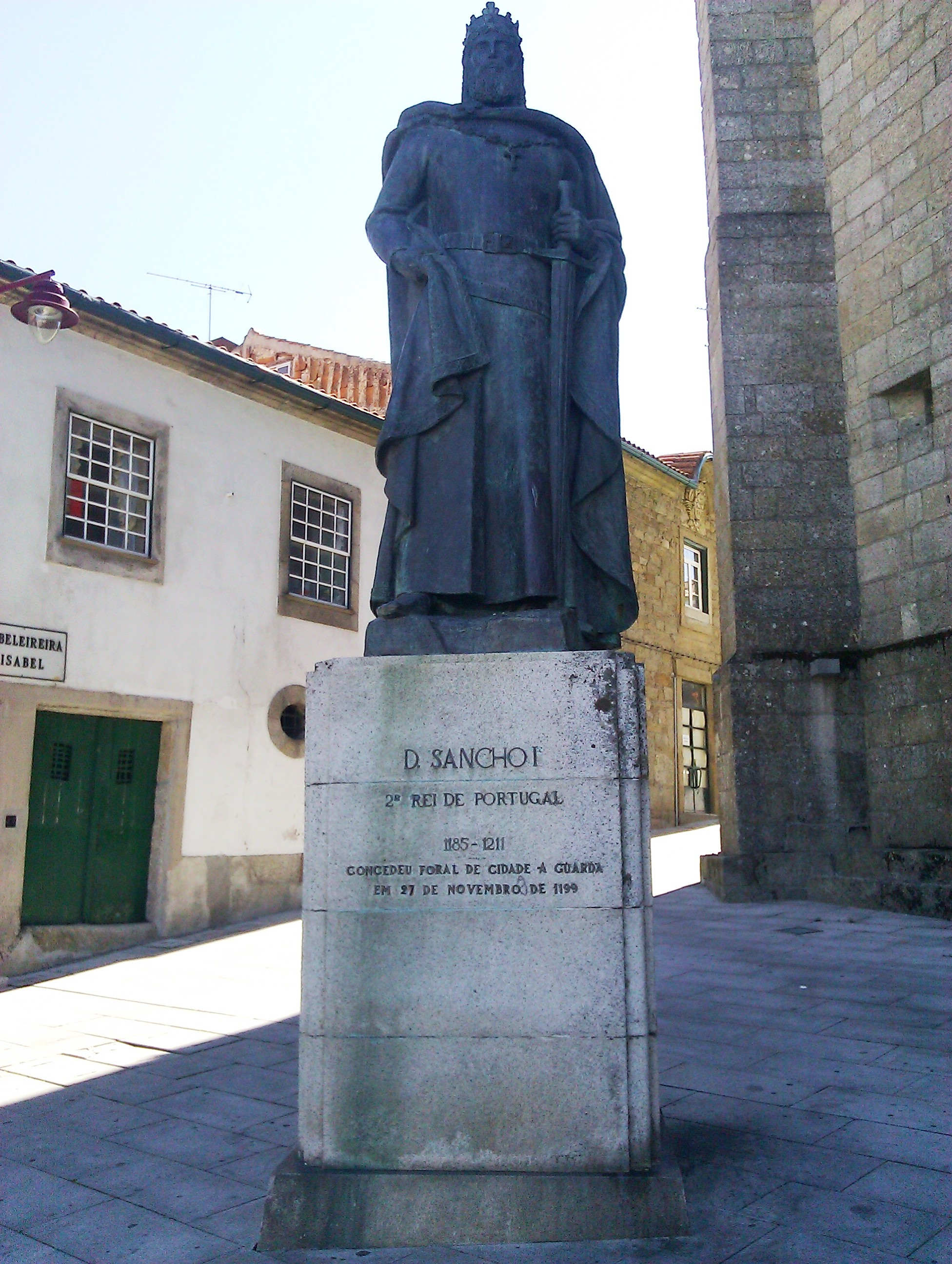
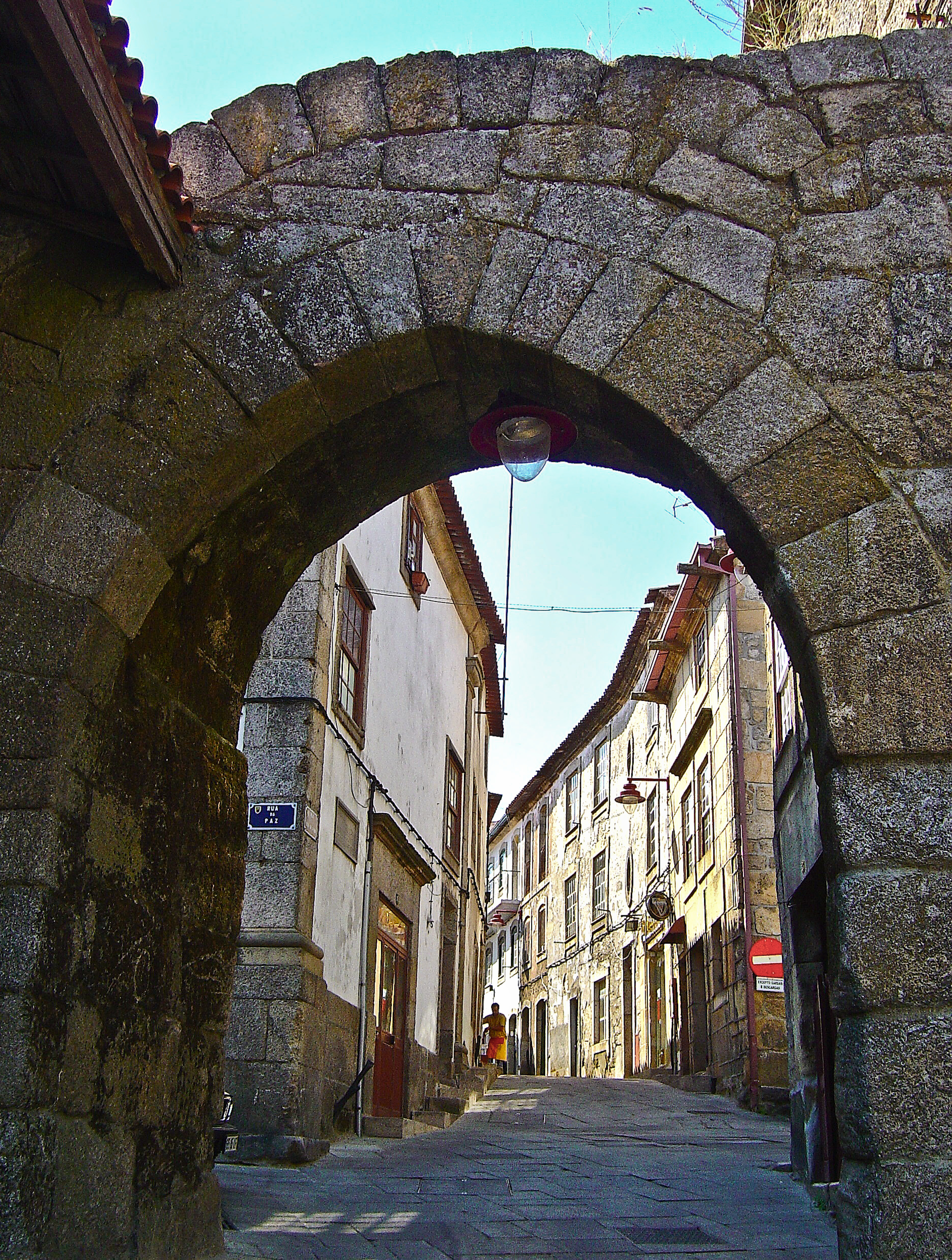
- View of Guarda, Cathedral, City hall, Church and Mercy Building, Statue of King Sancho I, Old arch

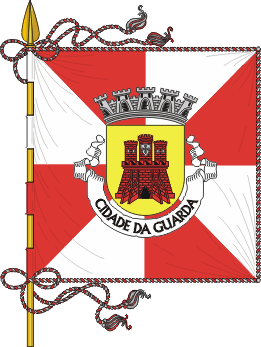
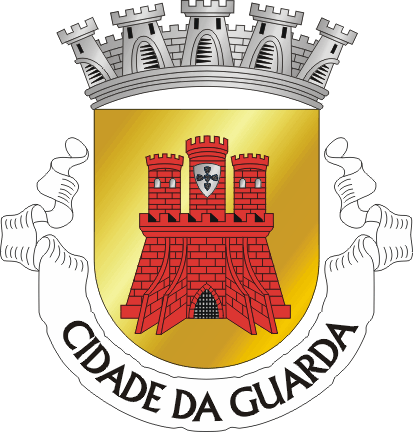
- Flag Coat of arms
- Interactive map of Guarda
- Location in Portugal
- Coordinates: 40°32′N 7°20′W
- Country: Portugal
- Region: Centro
- Intermunic. comm.: Beiras e Serra da Estrela
- District: Guarda
- Parishes: 43

Government
  - President: Sérgio Costa

Area
  - Total: 712.10 km^{2} (274.94 sq mi)
- Elevation: 1,056 m (3,465 ft)

Population (2021)
  - Total: 40,126
  - Density: 56.349/km^{2} (145.94/sq mi)
- Time zone: UTC+00:00 (WET)
  - Summer (DST): UTC+01:00 (WEST)
- Local holiday: November 27
- Website: http://www.mun-guarda.pt

Guarda (European Portuguese pronunciation: [ˈɡwaɾðɐ]) is a city and a municipality in the District of Guarda and the capital of the Beiras e Serra da Estrela sub-region in northern Portugal. The population in 2021 was 40,126, in an area of 712.10 square kilometres (274.94 mi^{2}) with 31,224 inhabitants in the city proper in 2006. Founded by King Sancho I in 1199, Guarda is the city located at the highest altitude in Portugal (1,056 m (3,465 ft) a.s.l.) and one of the most important cities in the Portuguese region of Beira Alta. Serra da Estrela, the highest mountain range in continental Portugal, is partially located in the district. The city is served by national and international trains on the Beira Alta and Baixa railway lines. The present mayor is Sérgio Costa, as an independent. The municipal holiday is November 27.

Guarda is known as the "city of the five F's": Farta, Forte, Fria, Fiel e Formosa - abundant (or totally satisfied), strong, cold, loyal and beautiful. The explanation of the five F's is as follows:

- Farta (abundant), due to the fertility of the lands of the Mondego River valley;
- Forte (strong), because the castle tower, the walls and its geographical location demonstrate its strength;
- Fria (cold), due to its proximity to Serra da Estrela;
- Fiel (loyal), because the Captain General of the Castle Guard, Álvaro Gil Cabral, Pedro Álvares Cabral's great-great-grandfather, refused to hand over the keys to the city to the King of Castile during the Crisis of 1383-1385 and still had the strength to participate in the Battle of Aljubarrota;
- Formosa (beautiful), for the natural beauty of the urban nucleus.

== Geography ==
Guarda is the largest city in its district, capital of the Guarda District and the Beira Interior Norte Subregion within the Centro Region. The municipality is bordered by Pinhel to the north, to the east by Almeida, to the southeast by Sabugal, to the south by Belmonte and Covilhã, to the west by Manteigas and Gouveia, and to the northwest by Celorico da Beira.

Guarda is the highest city in continental Portugal (altitude 1,056 m), located to the northeast of Serra da Estrela (the largest mountain in mainland Portugal). The main attraction in Guarda is its cathedral, known as the Sé da Guarda. Guarda is a diocese of the same name.

Guarda railway station is served by the railway line Linha da Beira Alta, with international services towards Salamanca and Madrid, and domestic services to Pinhel, Vila Franca das Naves/Trancoso, Celorico da Beira, Gouveia, Nelas, Carregal do Sal, Santa Comba Dão, Mortagua, Luso/Buçaco and Pampilhosa. The station at Guarda has (2013) eighteen daily arrivals and departures of passenger trains and there is a small freight terminal. The section of the Linha da Beira Baixa which runs from Guarda through Belmonte/Sabugal, Covilhã, Fundão, Castelo Branco and Abrantes to Entroncamento is operating again, having been closed in 2010 between Guarda and Covilhã.

The main motorways are A25 (Aveiro, Viseu, Guarda, Vilar Formoso) and A23 (Guarda, Covilhã, Fundão, Castelo Branco, Abrantes, Torres Novas). Numerous motorcoach (long distance bus) services use these motorways to link Guarda with Porto, Lisbon and other Portuguese cities.

Guarda is the antipode to Puponga in New Zealand.

== Climate ==
Guarda has a cool Mediterranean climate (Köppen: Csb) with some oceanic and continental influences. It has lower average temperatures than most climates of this subtype, in part due to its high altitude. Winters are cool and wet, and summers are warm and dry. Of the district capitals of Portugal, Guarda tends to experience the most snowfall, averaging about 12 days per year.

Climate data for Guarda (1991–2020)
| Month | Jan | Feb | Mar | Apr | May | Jun | Jul | Aug | Sep | Oct | Nov | Dec | Year |
|---|---|---|---|---|---|---|---|---|---|---|---|---|---|
| Record high °C (°F) | 15.9 (60.6) | 20.5 (68.9) | 23.0 (73.4) | 24.6 (76.3) | 30.8 (87.4) | 35.7 (96.3) | 38.3 (100.9) | 37.0 (98.6) | 35.7 (96.3) | 28.7 (83.7) | 21.3 (70.3) | 18.7 (65.7) | 38.3 (100.9) |
| Mean daily maximum °C (°F) | 7.2 (45.0) | 8.6 (47.5) | 11.8 (53.2) | 13.6 (56.5) | 17.6 (63.7) | 22.6 (72.7) | 26.6 (79.9) | 26.3 (79.3) | 22.0 (71.6) | 15.9 (60.6) | 10.3 (50.5) | 8.0 (46.4) | 15.9 (60.6) |
| Daily mean °C (°F) | 4.3 (39.7) | 5.3 (41.5) | 7.9 (46.2) | 9.4 (48.9) | 12.9 (55.2) | 17.1 (62.8) | 20.3 (68.5) | 20.3 (68.5) | 17.0 (62.6) | 12.4 (54.3) | 7.4 (45.3) | 5.2 (41.4) | 11.6 (52.9) |
| Mean daily minimum °C (°F) | 1.5 (34.7) | 2.0 (35.6) | 3.9 (39.0) | 5.2 (41.4) | 8.2 (46.8) | 11.6 (52.9) | 14.0 (57.2) | 14.4 (57.9) | 12.1 (53.8) | 8.8 (47.8) | 4.6 (40.3) | 2.4 (36.3) | 7.4 (45.3) |
| Record low °C (°F) | −8.4 (16.9) | −6.3 (20.7) | −10.3 (13.5) | −3.0 (26.6) | −0.2 (31.6) | 3.0 (37.4) | 5.7 (42.3) | 6.9 (44.4) | 3.5 (38.3) | −1.5 (29.3) | −5.0 (23.0) | −6.7 (19.9) | −10.3 (13.5) |
| Average precipitation mm (inches) | 101.1 (3.98) | 75.9 (2.99) | 90.5 (3.56) | 96.3 (3.79) | 80.6 (3.17) | 26.8 (1.06) | 14.4 (0.57) | 11.2 (0.44) | 56.5 (2.22) | 149.5 (5.89) | 128.4 (5.06) | 133.3 (5.25) | 964.3 (37.96) |
| Average precipitation days (≥ 1 mm) | 9.7 | 7.4 | 8.5 | 9.4 | 8.4 | 3.2 | 1.6 | 1.6 | 5.0 | 9.8 | 9.9 | 9.2 | 83.7 |
Source: Instituto Português do Mar e da Atmosfera

Climate data for Guarda, Portugal, 1981-2010 normals, altitude: 1,019 m (3,343 ft)
| Month | Jan | Feb | Mar | Apr | May | Jun | Jul | Aug | Sep | Oct | Nov | Dec | Year |
|---|---|---|---|---|---|---|---|---|---|---|---|---|---|
| Record high °C (°F) | 18.2 (64.8) | 17.6 (63.7) | 23.0 (73.4) | 24.5 (76.1) | 30.8 (87.4) | 33.7 (92.7) | 38.3 (100.9) | 34.6 (94.3) | 36.0 (96.8) | 27.0 (80.6) | 21.3 (70.3) | 15.8 (60.4) | 38.3 (100.9) |
| Mean daily maximum °C (°F) | 6.8 (44.2) | 8.6 (47.5) | 11.4 (52.5) | 12.4 (54.3) | 16.4 (61.5) | 21.2 (70.2) | 25.1 (77.2) | 25.0 (77.0) | 21.1 (70.0) | 15.0 (59.0) | 10.0 (50.0) | 7.8 (46.0) | 15.0 (59.0) |
| Daily mean °C (°F) | 4.0 (39.2) | 5.4 (41.7) | 7.6 (45.7) | 8.5 (47.3) | 12.0 (53.6) | 16.3 (61.3) | 19.5 (67.1) | 19.5 (67.1) | 16.5 (61.7) | 11.6 (52.9) | 7.5 (45.5) | 5.4 (41.7) | 11.1 (52.1) |
| Mean daily minimum °C (°F) | 1.2 (34.2) | 2.3 (36.1) | 3.7 (38.7) | 4.6 (40.3) | 7.7 (45.9) | 11.3 (52.3) | 14.0 (57.2) | 13.9 (57.0) | 11.9 (53.4) | 8.3 (46.9) | 5.0 (41.0) | 2.9 (37.2) | 7.2 (45.0) |
| Record low °C (°F) | −10.8 (12.6) | −6.2 (20.8) | −8.0 (17.6) | −3.8 (25.2) | −1.8 (28.8) | 1.2 (34.2) | 4.4 (39.9) | 6.0 (42.8) | 3.5 (38.3) | −0.6 (30.9) | −7.5 (18.5) | −6.7 (19.9) | −10.8 (12.6) |
| Average precipitation mm (inches) | 104.8 (4.13) | 71.2 (2.80) | 59.4 (2.34) | 86.7 (3.41) | 86.3 (3.40) | 33.9 (1.33) | 18.2 (0.72) | 10.4 (0.41) | 58.2 (2.29) | 107.4 (4.23) | 127.1 (5.00) | 150.6 (5.93) | 914.2 (35.99) |
Source: Instituto de Meteorologia

== Toponym ==
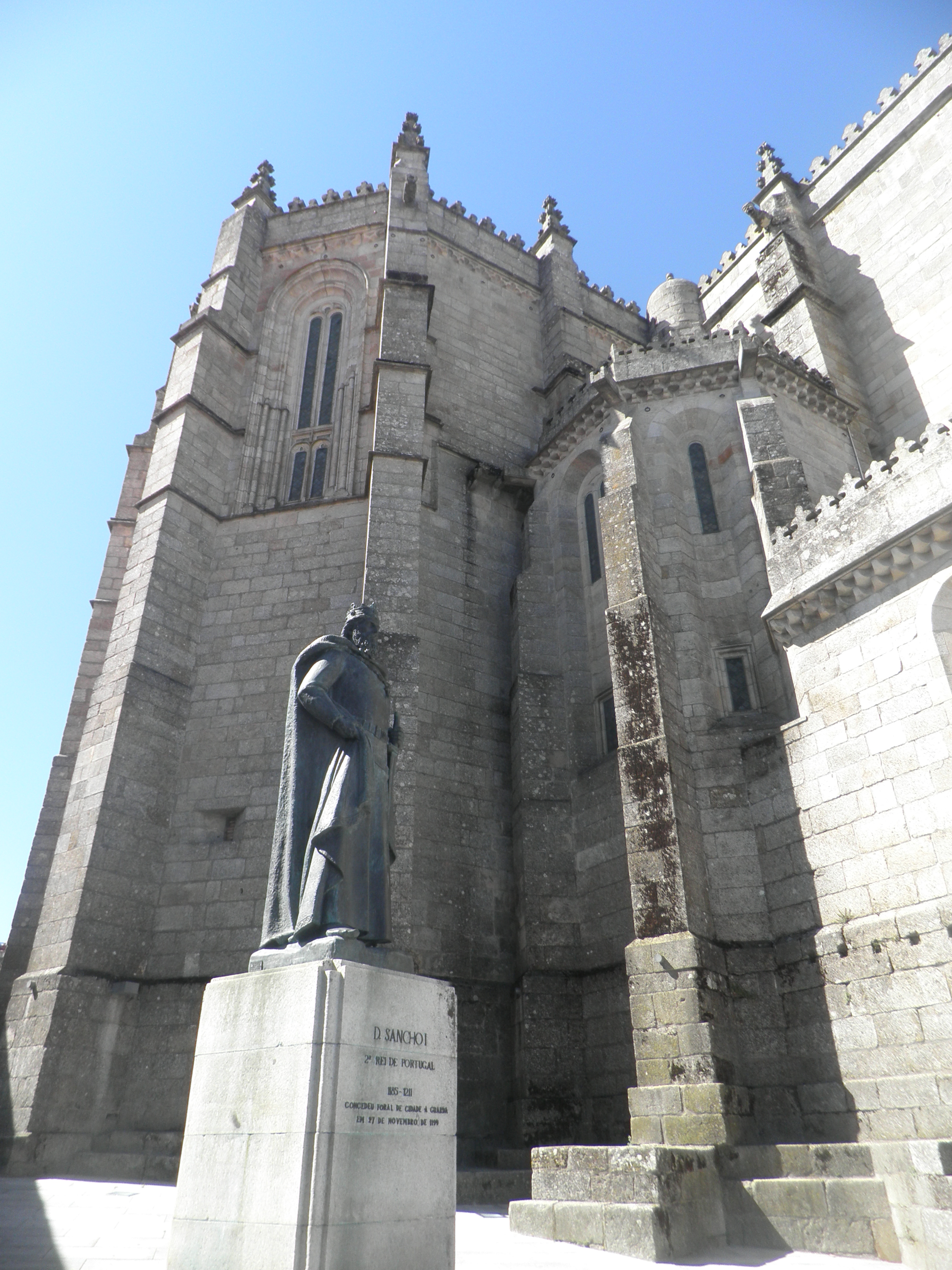
Sé Cathedral and the statue of Dom Sancho I.

For a long time historians believed that the civitas Igaeditanorum (Egitania) was located in Guarda, but more recently it has been established that this location was in Idanha-a-Velha, in Beira Baixa. It was from here that the gentile "egitanian", in relation to the natives of the city, took root. Bordering the lands of the igaeditani, north of Guarda, were the lands of the Lancians Oppidani whose capital, the civitas Lancia Oppidana, was referred to as being located a short distance from the current location of Guarda. This theory was fiercely defended by General João de Almeida (influential Portuguese military man, hero of the African campaigns, native of Guarda), which has led some critics to disparage it. However, all the following investigations indicate its veracity. The place name "Guarda" may have been a derivation of a fortress overlooking the Mondego River, the Castro Tintinolho, whose place was called "Ward" by the Visigoths.

== History ==
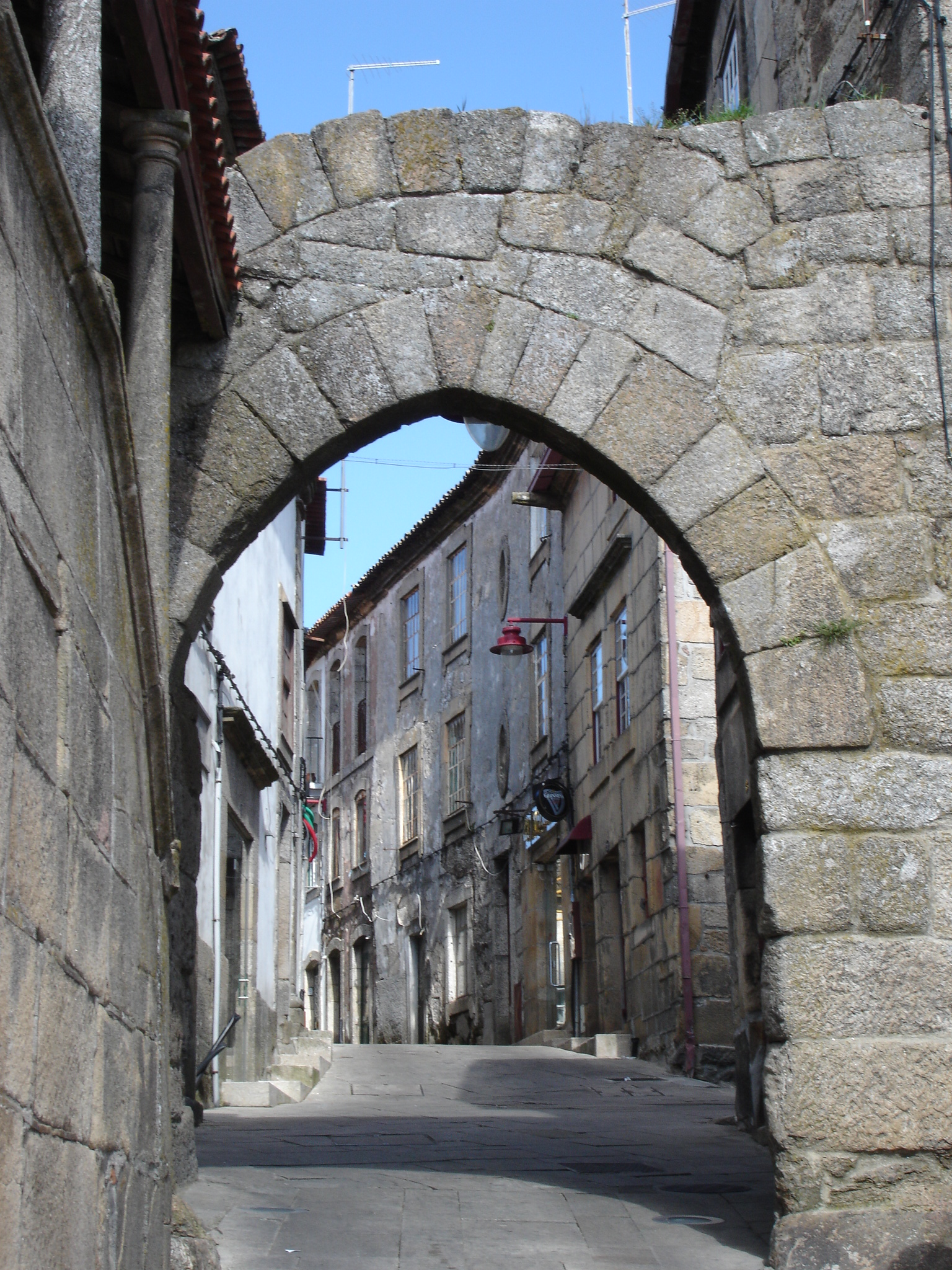
Porta do Sol.

=== Prehistory ===
There is evidence of a meteorite impact in the region, northeast of Guarda, with about 35 km in diameter. Some pre-Ordovician evidence (from the Cambrian period, the earliest Phanerozoic epoch) is present.

=== From the Neolithic to the Christian Reconquest ===
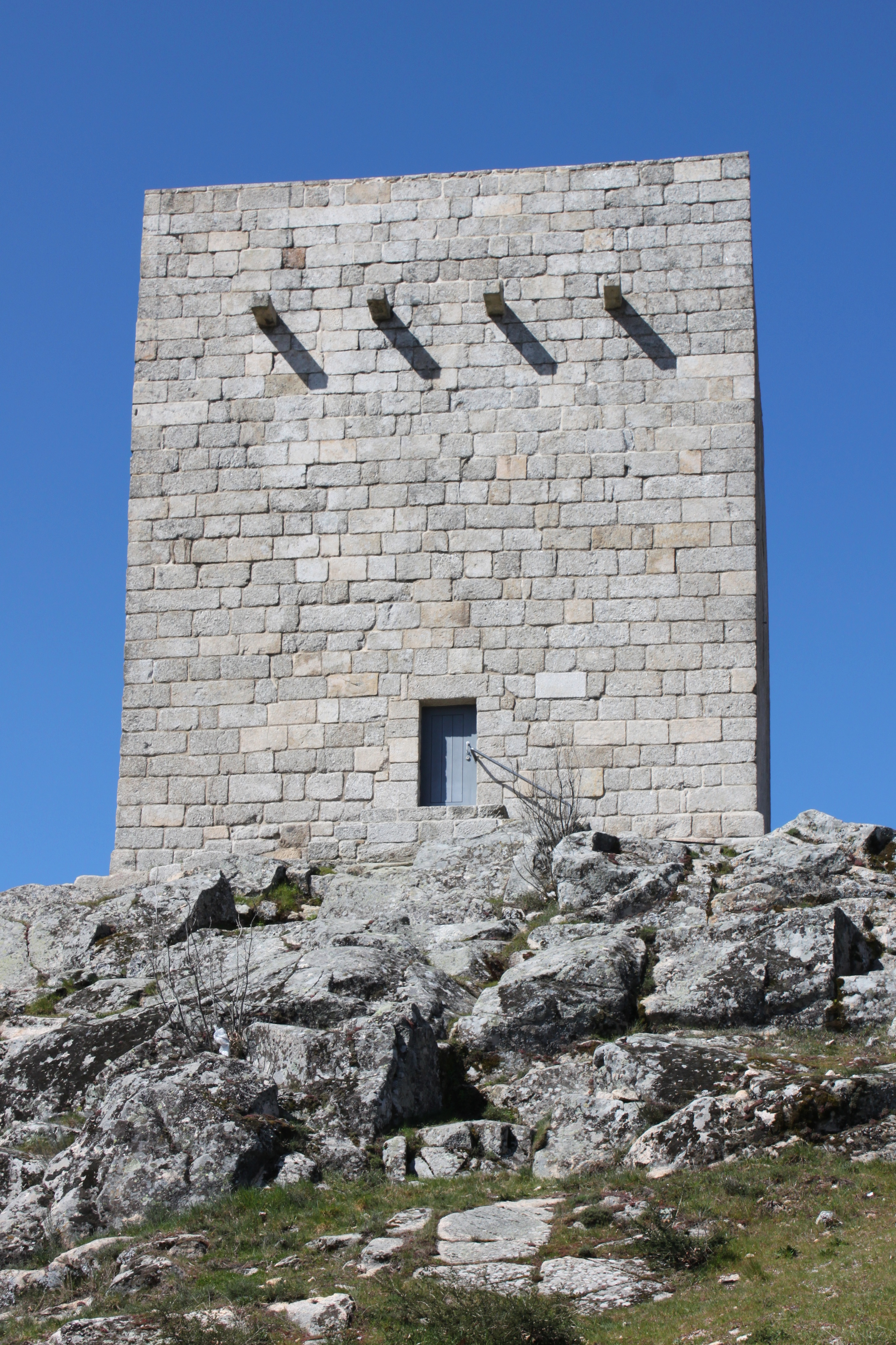
Main tower of the Castle of Guarda

In the first centuries of the Romanization of the Iberian Peninsula, Lusitanian tribes lived in the Guarda region. These tribes included, namely, the Igaeditani, the Lancienses Oppidani, and the Transcudani. These peoples, united under a true federation, resisted Romanization for two centuries. Unlike the Latinized towns, these towns did not consume wine, but instead, acorn beer. His weapon of choice was the falcata: a curved sword, which easily broke Roman swords due to its metallurgical superiority. Their pagan gods also differed from the Romans. Some Lusitanian religious inscriptions can still be found in some sanctuaries such as Cabeço de Fráguas. It is argued that the ancestral town of Castelos Velhos, from the Iron Age, was located in the current city of Guarda.

Although there are doubts about the place of birth, the Lusitanian warrior Viriathus (hero of Portuguese history to the present day) could have been born in the Guarda region in the "Herminios Mountains", corresponding to the current Serra da Estrela. Other historians suggest that he may have been born closer to the Portuguese coast. His death by murder by traitors paid by Caepio, Roman consul and military man who participated in the Lusitanian War, occurred in Cabeço de Fráguas, in the current municipality of Guarda, in 139 or 138 BC.

After Roman times, the period of occupation by the Visigoths followed. Later, the region was occupied by the Islamic civilization and by the Kingdom of Asturias. Only after the process of the Christian reconquest was its jurisdiction granted, which definitely confirmed the importance of the city and the region.

=== Burgundy dynasty ===
The city of Guarda was founded in 1199, in a location that was both difficult to reach and allowed as many as twenty leagues of the surrounding territory to be watched, and Sancho I of Portugal transferred the diocese of Egitania (modern day Idanha-a-Velha) to Guarda, while granting the city a charter that was based on the short charter of Salamanca. Situated high up, the city had a remarkable defensive and strategic importance. The Jewish quarter of the city, which already had some importance back in the 13th century among the communities of the kingdom of Portugal, was between 600 and 850 people in the 15th century, and hosted a significant number Jews expelled from Spain in 1492.

In 1202 the diocese of Guarda was created, transferred from Idanha, the ancient and important Egitanian Roman city, which was largely abandoned during the time of the invasions and wars against the Moors (Muslims), since, according to the legends, its situation on the border and its difficult location and defense exposed it to military attacks by Moors and Christians. The city of Guarda was founded in a place much easier to defend, which would allow it to be taken Idanha as the main post of Beira Interior.

The first Cathedral of Guarda was built in that same year, on the initiative of Bishop D. Martinho and with the support of King Sancho I. However, a few years later, it would be transferred to another place inside the city gates, between the years 1208 and 1214. Between 1390 and 1396 the current Cathedral of Guarda was built, at the initiative of Bishop D. Frei Vasco after the support granted by the king John I. The cathedral was later expanded between 1397 and 1426, between 1435 and 1458, and between 1504 and 1517.

King Denis and Queen Elizabeth were in the Guarda region after their marriage, held on February 11, 1281, at the Royal Palace of Barcelona. They were there between November 1281 and the end of July 1282, particularly in the town of Trancoso. The king signed the "Customs of Guarda" which consisted of letters from King Denis regarding the appeals of the residents of the villages and farms under the ecclesiastical jurisdiction of the bishop, on the income of 1,100 pounds that the county leased to Afonso, count of Boulogne, and also on the conflict that existed between the inhabitants of Vela and the inhabitants of Guarda (1311, 1315, 1321). There King Denis also prepared war with Castile, which would be resolved through the Treaty of Alcañices. In 1282, King Denis held the first Cortes de Guarda.

=== 1383–1385 Portuguese interregnum and House of Aviz ===
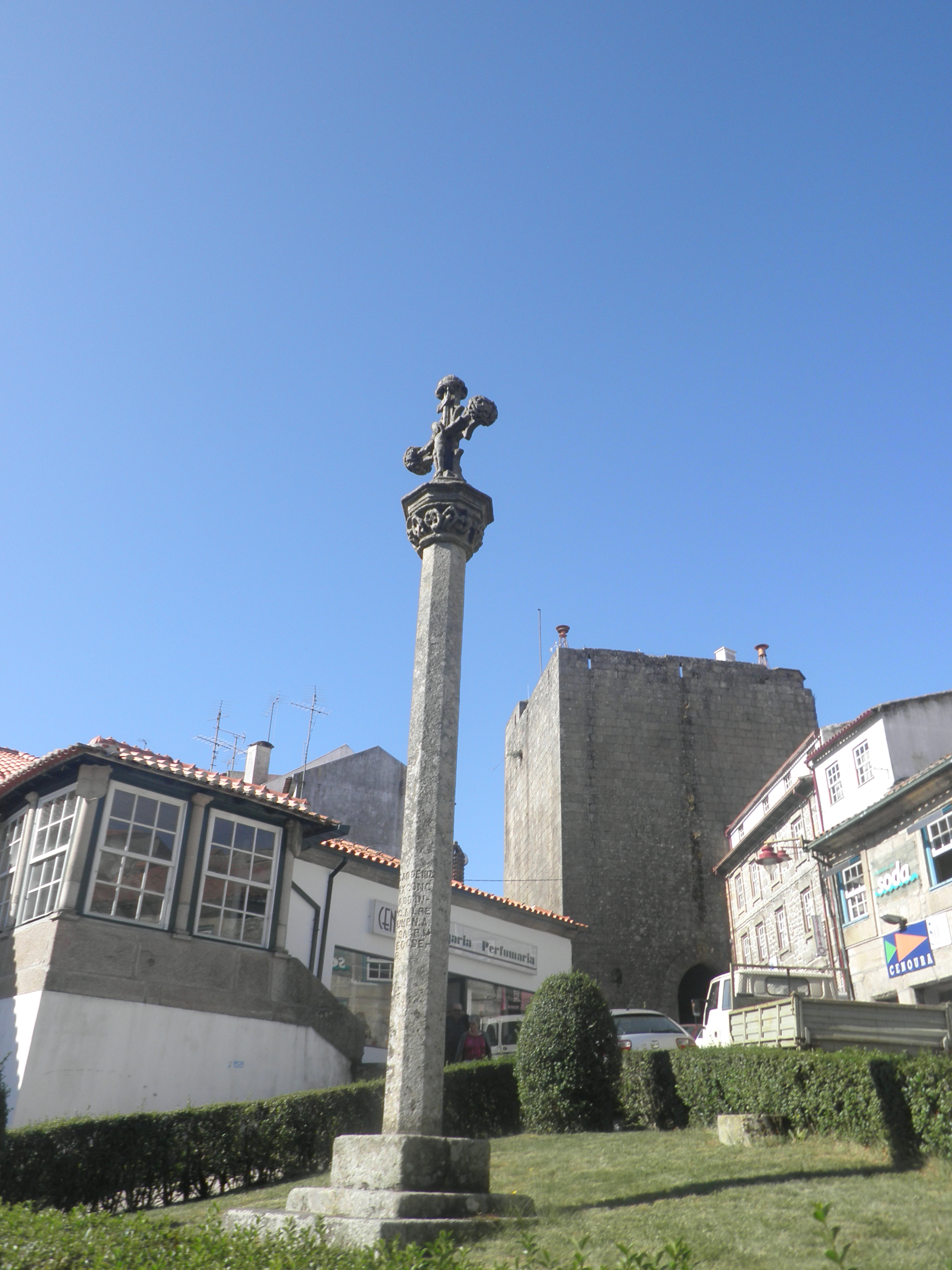
Cruise (or pillory) of Guarda.

In 1371, Denis granted in Guarda a "land of refuge" for the "humanized", who were the people convicted of murder, whom the king pardoned certain crimes or misdemeanors, with the aim that they would settle in the lands near borders. In 1383 a college for poor students was created in the city by Bishop Afonso Correia II, associated with the Episcopal school of Guarda, existing since (at least) the 13th century.

In 1465 King Afonso V made new Courts in Guarda, where the judges of the Civil Chamber were forbidden to disembark facts related to the city of Lisbon and whose resolutions were exclusive powers of the king. In 1475, Prince John (future King John II) led a Council in Guarda to gather the troops that would participate in the Battle of Toro, within the course of the War of the Castilian Succession. In the 1490s, when the expulsion of the Jews from Spain happened, Guarda received new inhabitants for its Jewish community, who would bring a new life to commerce in this border area. In 1493, the born and resident of Guarda, Rui de Pina, planned the Treaty of Tordesillas and set out on a diplomatic mission to Castile. In 1496 and 1497, during the reign of Manuel I, the conversion or expulsion of the Jews was ordered, which led to the appearance of the so-called New Christians (or Marranos), and as well as the expulsion of the moors, dand or place to the appearance of crypto-Judaism in the region. On October 22, 1536, the Inquisition began, and the persecution against Hindus (in Portuguese India), Muslims and Jews was launched. The persecutions were also launched in Guarda, particularly as of June 8, 1564, when authorization was given to D. Ambrosio Capelo, inquisitor of Guarda, to conduct the inquisition in the dioceses of Guarda and Lamego.

=== Portuguese succession crisis of 1580 ===
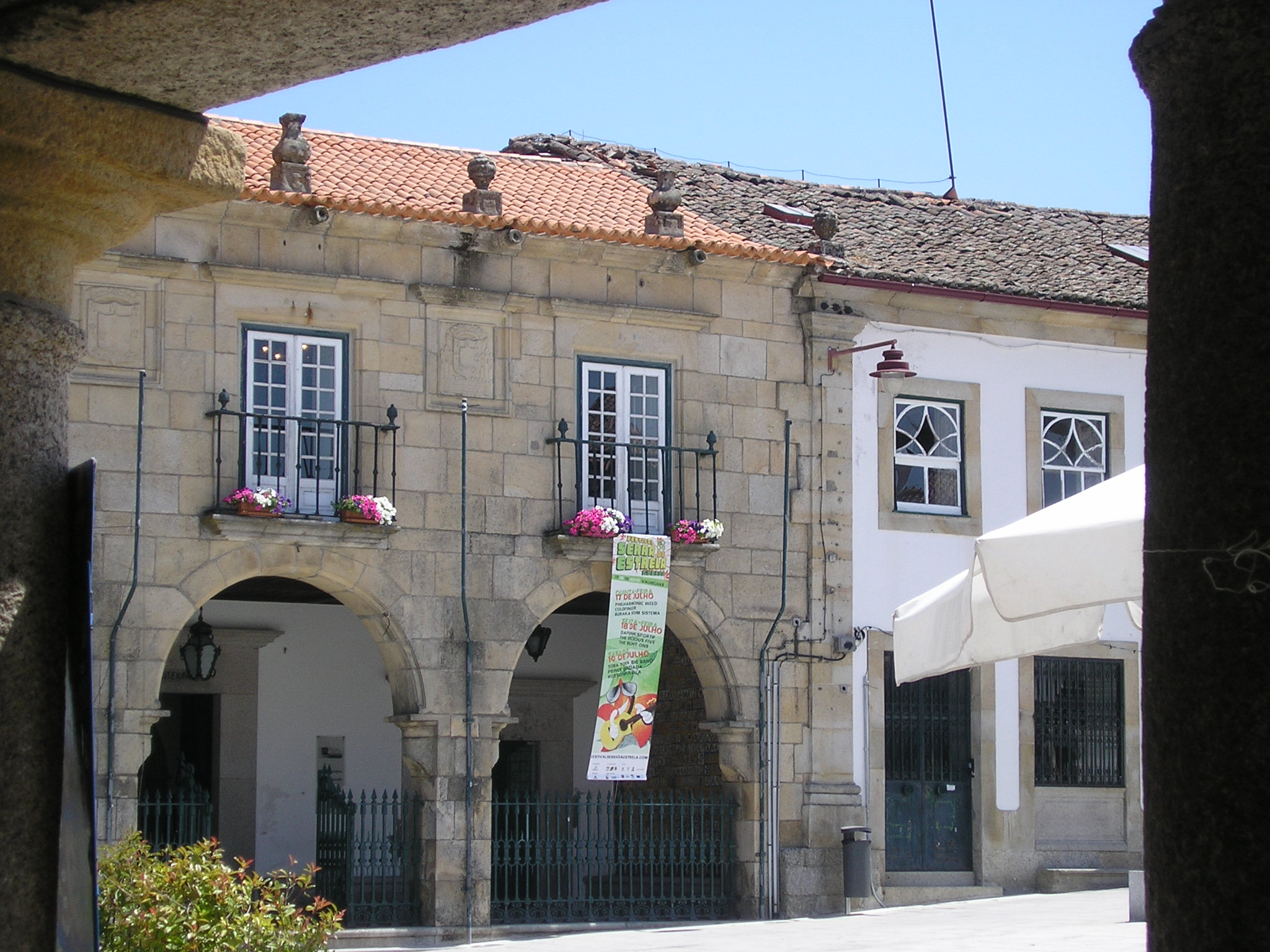
Old building of the city hall of the city of Guarda from the 17th century.

In 1580, during the course of the dynastic crisis of 1580, the Bishop of Guarda, D. João, took sides for the independence of Portugal and opposed Philippine rule. The bishop then resisted the outcome of the Battle of Alcântara and continued to side with António, Prior of Crato, contrary to all the other Portuguese bishops. On March 18, 1582, the Pope condemned the "excesses" committed by D. João, bishop of Guarda, and he died in 1592 under the rule of Philip II of Spain (Philip I of Portugal).

=== Iberian Union ===
On September 21, 1597, the synod was held in which new statutes or constitutions of the bishopric of the city began, in order to accommodate the decrees of the Council of Trent, in the context of the Counter-Reformation of the Catholic Church.

=== Braganza Dynasty ===
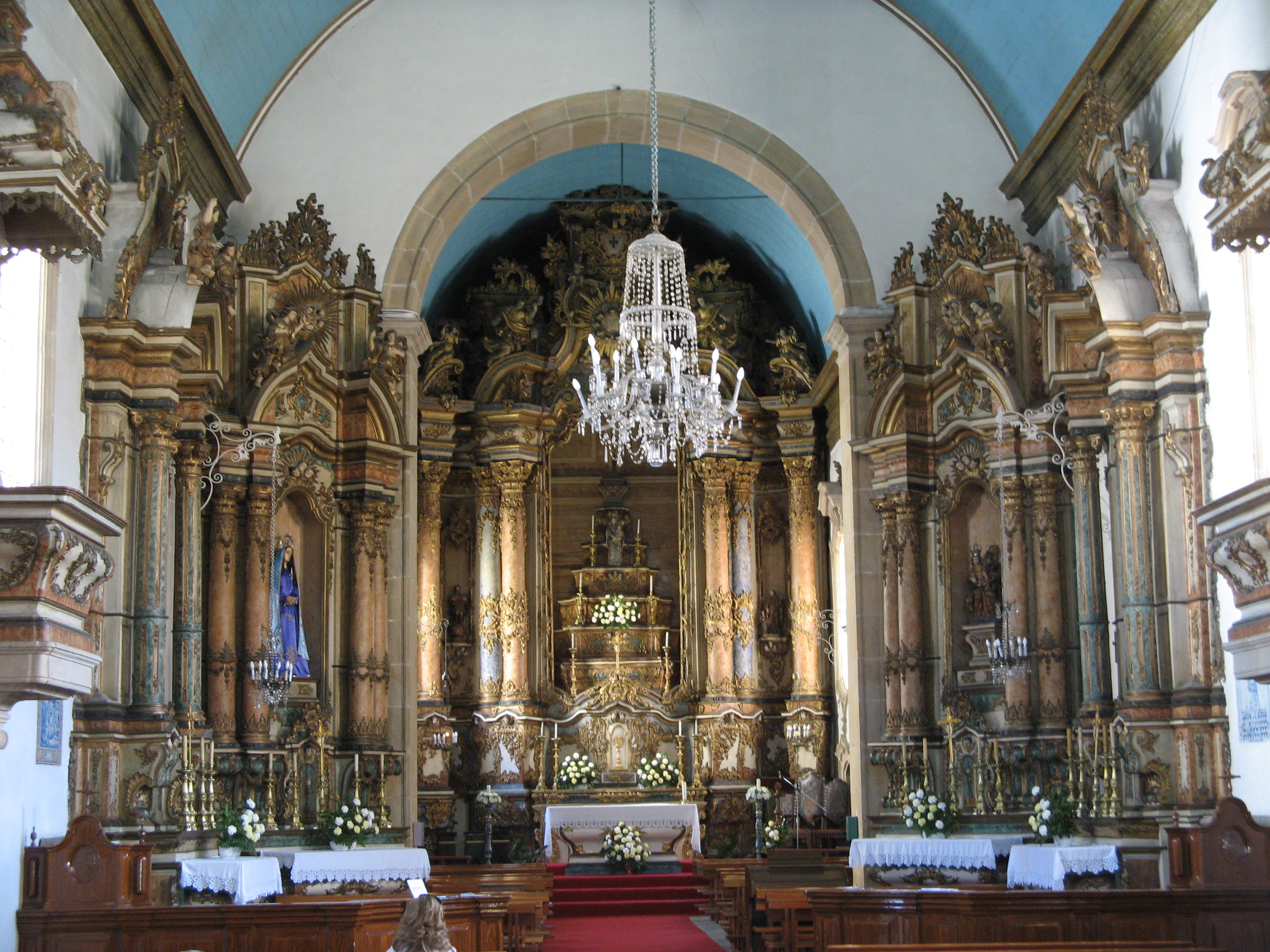
Interior of the Misericórdia Church.

In 1655 the exploitation of tin mines in Guarda was intensified. In 1674, the diocesan synod of Guarda took place, in order to regulate tithes. Between 1728 and 1730, the Guardense doctor Simão de Castro was convicted of the inquisition in the city, for accusations of Judaism. As a result, he took refuge in Portuguese India, where he settled from 1734.

In 1762-1763 the Guarda region was invaded by Spanish forces, during the Seven Years' War, and several towns in the area were occupied by Spain, including Almeida. This town was returned to Portugal in 1763, after the peace treaty signed in Paris. In 1801, the Marquis of Alorna built bunkers in Guarda, against bomb attacks, after the deterioration of diplomatic relations with Spain. That same year, the first section of the walls was demolished, on the orders of Alorna Marqués, in order to reuse its stone in the construction of a fort in the neighboring town of Vale de Estrela, to the west of the city. As a result of the Napoleonic invasion of Portugal, with troops commanded by the French general Loison, a revolt took place in Guarda on June 21, 1808, after the transfer of the Portuguese court to Brazil as a result of these invasions. The March 22, 1811, the French general André Masséna decided to concentrate the French army around Guarda and Belmonte, far from the fortresses of Ciudad Rodrigo and Almeida. On April 3 of the same year, at the Battle of Sabugal, the British General Wellington won against General Jean Reynier, and forced Masséna to leave Portugal. After the particularly severe devastations caused in the Diocese of Guarda and its neighboring Diocese of Pinhel (currently also in the district of Guarda), these two dioceses were, in Portugal, until August 1811, the third and fourth most benefited by donations to the victims of the third French invasion of Portugal led by Masséna, just behind Leiria and Lisbon.

In 1829, during a cold snap, it was reported in Guarda that temperatures had dropped to low enough to freeze eggs, brandy, and other things that only freeze in severe cold. In 1835, another section of the wall was destroyed, between the keep and Porta Nova (New Gate), and its stone was used in the construction of the new public cemetery. In 1855 the Lyceum of Guarda was founded. In this institution, famous people related to literature and other intellectual areas in Portugal studied, including Vergílio Ferreira (writer awarded the Camões Prize), Eduardo Lourenço (essayist and philosopher) and Augusto Gil (neo-romantic poet) In 1868, during the reign of Luis I, the publication of Guarda's O Egytaniense began, which was one of the first newspapers in Guarda and probably the first newspaper in the city. The Humanitarian Association of Egitanian Volunteer Firefighters (which, today, is better known as "Guarda Volunteer Firefighters"), was founded in 1876 at the initiative of a group of Guardenses concerned about the lack of a fire department in the city. In 1881, the Diocese of Pinhel (including, namely Almeida) was extinct and incorporated into the Diocese of Guarda. In 1882 the Beira Alta railway line was inaugurated (with the presence of King Louis I and the royal family), which linked the coastal city of Figueira da Foz and Vilar Formoso, on the border with Spain, stopping at the Guarda railway station. It is currently the main railway connection between Portugal and the rest of Europe. In 1893, a second railway line was completed with the terminal station in Guarda (the Beira Baixa line), connecting this city and Abrantes, in Ribatejo. On January 1, 1899, electric lighting was introduced in Guarda, making it one of the first Portuguese cities to be electrified. In 1897 the "Escola Normal" (Normal School) was founded in the city for the training of secondary school teachers. In May 1907, with the presence of King Carlos and Queen Amélia, the Sousa Martins Sanatorium was inaugurated in the city, the first of its kind that has been introduced by the National Assistance to tuberculosis victims.

=== First Portuguese Republic, Estado Novo, Third Portuguese Republic ===
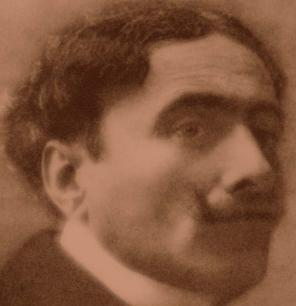
Guardense poet Augusto Gil.

After the implementation of the republic in Portugal, in 1910, newspapers would appear throughout the District of Guarda, with a special concentration in Guarda and Seia, that for the most part would clearly assume republican ideals for propaganda purposes. These constituted a source of extreme importance for the reconstruction of the recent history of the various communities of the District during the implementation of the republican regime.

The legendary Guardense poet Augusto Gil died on February 26, 1929, already at the time of the military dictatorship. After the political and military upheavals and the economic crisis, largely caused by the decision on Portugal's participation in the First World War, the military coup of May 28, 1926, occurred, which would lead to a 48-year dictatorship, military until the mid-1930s, and then civil, until 1974. Meanwhile, the only moment in which the dictatorship of Salazar (Franco's ally in Spain) was threatened, occurred in 1958 when General Humberto Delgado decided to run for the presidential elections, proposing the resignation of Salazar. On the night of April 24, 1974, Captain Augusto José Monteiro Valente, of the Guarda Infantry Regiment, arrested its commander and joined the Armed Forces Movement (MFA) that the following day was going to overthrow the dictatorial regime of Salazar and Caetano in the Carnation Revolution, being described as one of the brightest and most committed Portuguese military in this revolution.

In 1942 the first hotel was opened in the city of Guarda, the "Hotel Turismo" active to this day, and an iconic symbol of tourism in this city. In 1963, the Industrias Lusitanas Renault (automobile factory) began to work in Guarda, which would be active until 1987, producing 189,461 vehicles of the models Renault 4, Renault 5, Renault 6, Renault 8, Renault 10, Renault 12, Renault 16 and Renault Trafic. Then came "Delco Remy" and then "Delphi (Autopeças)", until the closure of this American multinational in December 2010. In 1965 the Guarda Nursing School (now known as the Escola Superior de Saúde) was created, which later, in 2001, would be integrated into the Guarda Polytechnic Institute. In 1980, the Guarda Polytechnic Institute was created, which began its academic activities in 1986 through the Higher School of Education and, the following year, the Higher School of Technology and Management. In 1999, the Higher School of Tourism and Telecommunications would also be created in this institute, in the neighboring city of Seia.

== Gastronomy ==
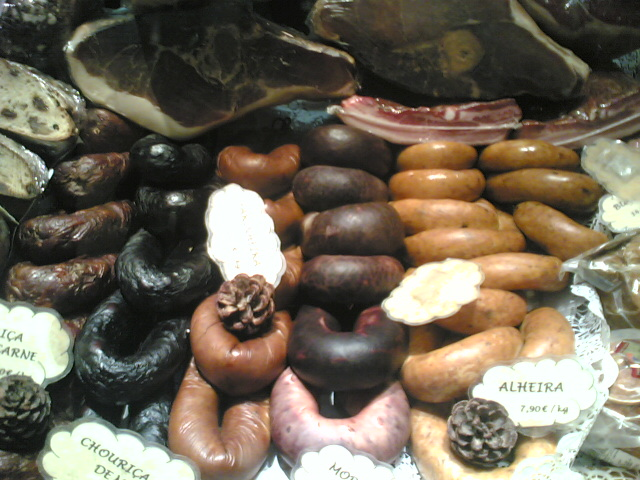
Traditional enchidos in the Guarda region.

The gastronomy of Guarda is associated with the gastronomy of the Serra da Estrela. Some of the most outstanding typical dishes are the following: roast lamb, rice with duck in the Guarda way, and Lagareiro cod, which can be easily found in regional cuisine restaurants. The gastronomy of the city includes a wide range of meat-based dishes, given the geographical location of the city, as well as the surrounding lands, which are conducive to grazing. There is also a wide variety of fish dishes from freshwater streams. Cod is the exception, since its conservation process (by drying) has always allowed its consumption in lands far from the sea. The pig occupies an important place in the local gastronomy, with countless dishes made with this type of meat. The ham cured in sea salt can be highlighted, as well as the typical local cured meats (black pudding, farinheira and chouriço), such as tripe with vegetables. Other common meats are lamb, goat, beef, and white meat. Carquesa (Genista tridentata) rice is also a very typical dish in the city and the region.

At the time of the hunting season, unique dishes, such as hare rice "malandrinho", or wild boar with beans are eaten.

In the fall, Trancoso's edible mushroom stew (champignons) and chestnut soup are popular (it can also be eaten cooked, boiled, or sweet).

== Heritage ==
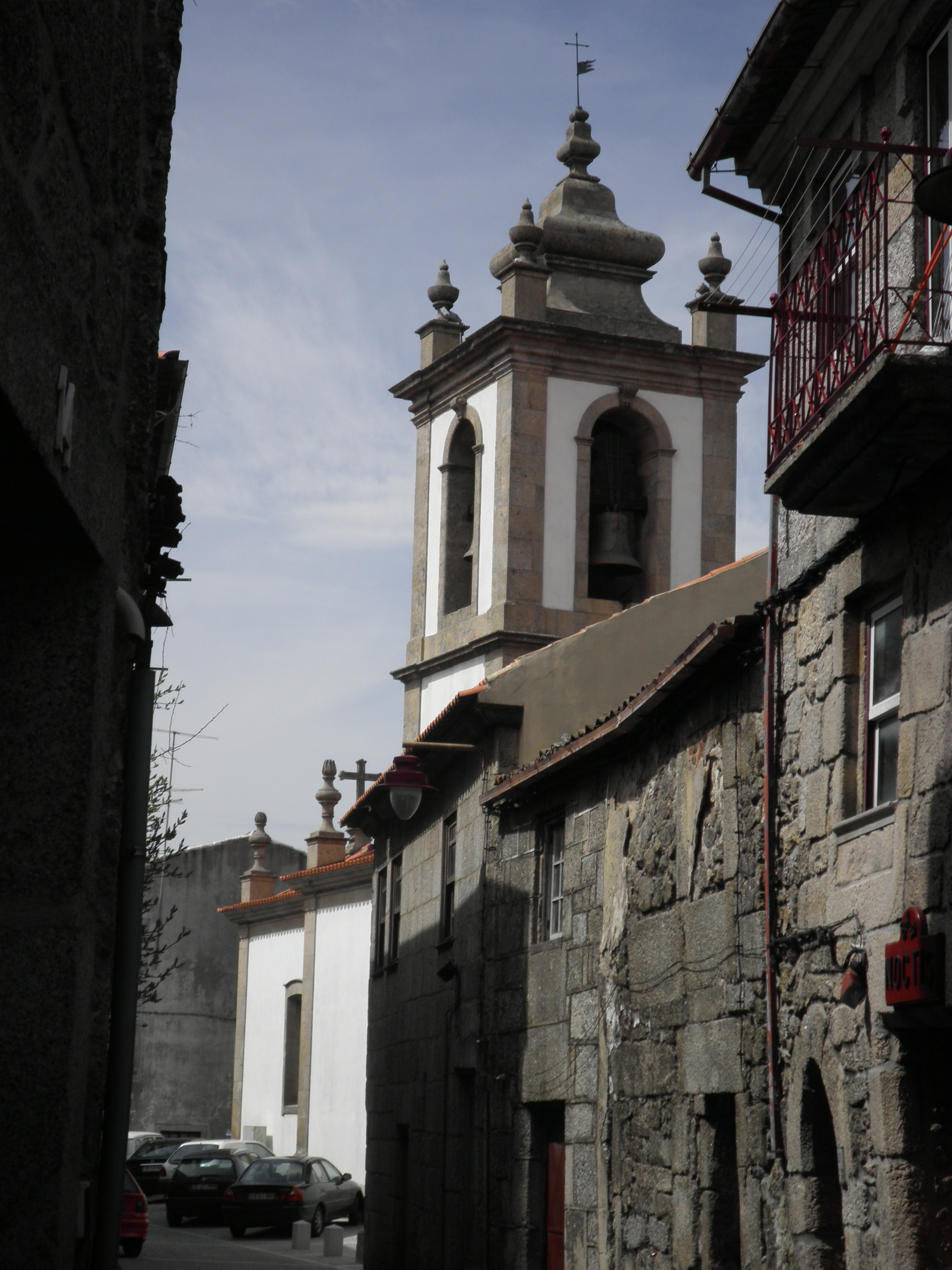
Medieval street with the Church of São Vicente in the background.

- Guarda Cathedral

A medieval temple built in Gothic and Manueline styles. Its restoration, carried out by the architect Rosendo Carvalheira, took place between 1899 and 1921.

- Castle of Guarda

The castle was declared a National Monument on June 16, 1910. Its construction, supposedly on a Roman-Lusitanian fort from the 1st century, took place between the 12th and 14th centuries.

- Old Episcopal Palace of Guarda
- Anta da Pêra do Moço
- Tower of the blacksmiths (ferreiros)
- Convent of São Francisco de Guarda or Convent of the Holy Spirit
- Chapel of Our Lady of Mileu
- Archaeological site of Póvoa do Mileu
- Fountain of Dorna
- Church of São Vicente
- Church of Misericórdia
- Cruise or pillory (pelourinho) from Guarda
- Castro do Jarmelo (place built in pre-Roman) times
- Paços do Concelho, (old town hall)
- Castro de Tintinolho, an important place in the wars between Lusitanians and Romans
- Solar na Rua do Encontro (house built in the 15th or 16th century, which at the end of the 17th century was enriched in its facade, with an innovative element that transformed the appearance of the room, which gave it a nobility status to the family that lived there.)
- Casa das Chaves Bandarra (House of the Keys Bandarra), on Calle Sancho I
- Fountain (Chafariz) of the Alameda de Santo André

== Economy ==
The main economic sectors of Guarda are: tourism, textiles, electric wire and cable industry for automobile manufacturing and for energy industries, wood, glass, marble and granite processing, metallurgy, aluminum manufacturing, chemical products, blinds, cold cuts, bakery and pastry, dairy industry, as well as construction companies. There are also handicraft activities and agricultural and agro-livestock activities in the rural environment of the municipality.

== Recreational and sports clubs ==
The main football club in the city is Guarda Unida, which participates in the first district division in the 2014-2015 season. Other clubs and associations of this type in the city include the Guarda Mountaineering Club, founded in 1981, The Pinheiro Center for Sport, Culture and Social Solidarity, integrated into the Guarda Athletics Association, the CSS - Associação de Desenvolvimento Carapito S. Salvador and the Lameirinhas Sports and Recreation Group, dedicated to futsal.

== Parishes ==
The municipality consists of the following 43 parishes:

- Adão
- Aldeia do Bispo
- Aldeia Viçosa
- Alvendre
- Arrifana
- Avelãs da Ribeira
- Avelãs de Ambom e Rocamondo
- Benespera
- Casal de Cinza
- Castanheira
- Cavadoude
- Codesseiro
- Corujeira e Trinta
- Faia
- Famalicão
- Fernão Joanes
- Gonçalo
- Gonçalo Bocas
- Guarda
- Jarmelo São Miguel
- Jarmelo São Pedro
- João Antão
- Maçainhas
- Marmeleiro
- Meios
- Mizarela, Pêro Soares e Vila Soeiro
- Panóias de Cima
- Pega
- Pêra do Moço
- Porto da Carne
- Pousade e Albardo
- Ramela
- Rochoso e Monte Margarida
- Santana da Azinha
- Sobral da Serra
- Vale de Estrela
- Valhelhas
- Vela
- Videmonte
- Vila Cortês do Mondego
- Vila Fernando
- Vila Franca do Deão
- Vila Garcia

== International relations ==
Guarda is twinned with:

- Béjar, Spain (since 1979)
- Safad, Israel (since 1982)
- Waterbury, United States (since 1984)
- Siegburg, Germany (since 1985)
- Wattrelos, France (since 1990)

== Notable people ==
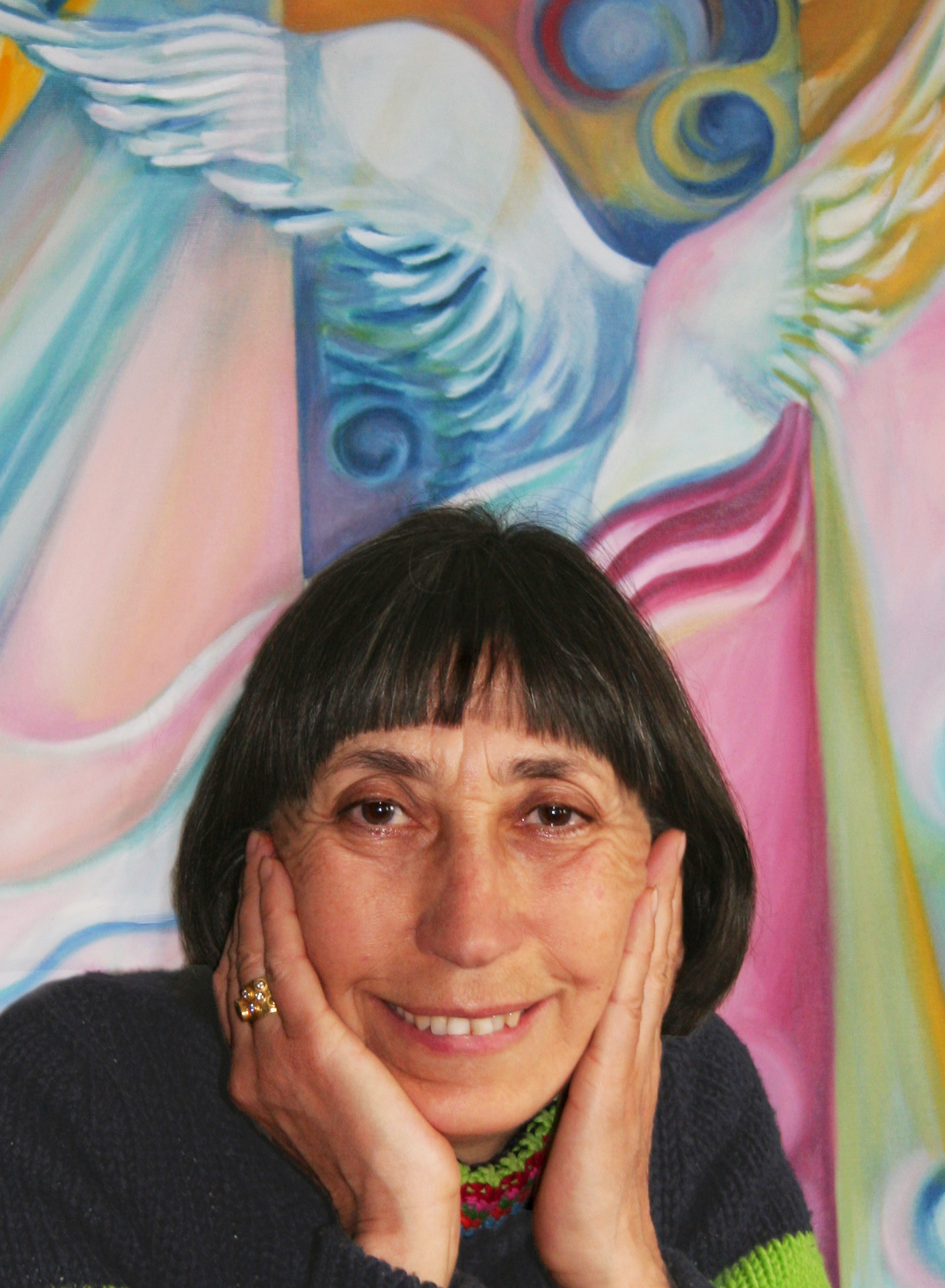
Evelina Coelho, 2013

- Rui de Pina (1440–1522) a Portuguese chronicler.
- Francisco Cabral (1529-1609) a Portuguese Jesuit priest and missionary in Japan.
- Francisco de Pina (1585–1625) a Portuguese Jesuit priest and missionary in Vietnam
- José de Castro (1868–1929) lawyer, journalist and 63rd Prime Minister of Portugal in 1915
- Augusto Gil (1873 - 1929 in Guarda) a lawyer and poet, combining Symbolist verse with satire and simple lyricism,
- Álvaro de Castro (1878-1928) 78th and 88th Prime Minister of Portugal in 1920 & 1923/4.
- Fausto Lopo de Carvalho (1890–1970) a pulmonologist specialising in phthisiology
- José Saraiva Martins (born 1932 in Gagos de Jarmelo) a Portuguese Cardinal of the Roman Catholic Church and the Prefect Emeritus of the Congregation for the Causes of Saints
- Lili Caneças (born 1944) a Portuguese socialite.
- Evelina Coelho (1945-2013) a Portuguese painter from Vila Fernando
- Carmen Yazalde (born 1950) a Portuguese Argentine model and actress.
- José Urbano (born 1966) a retired three-time Olympian race walker
- Inês Monteiro (born 1980) a middle and long distance track running athlete
- Pedro Carvalho (born 1985) a Portuguese actor.
