= Loriga =

- Civil parish
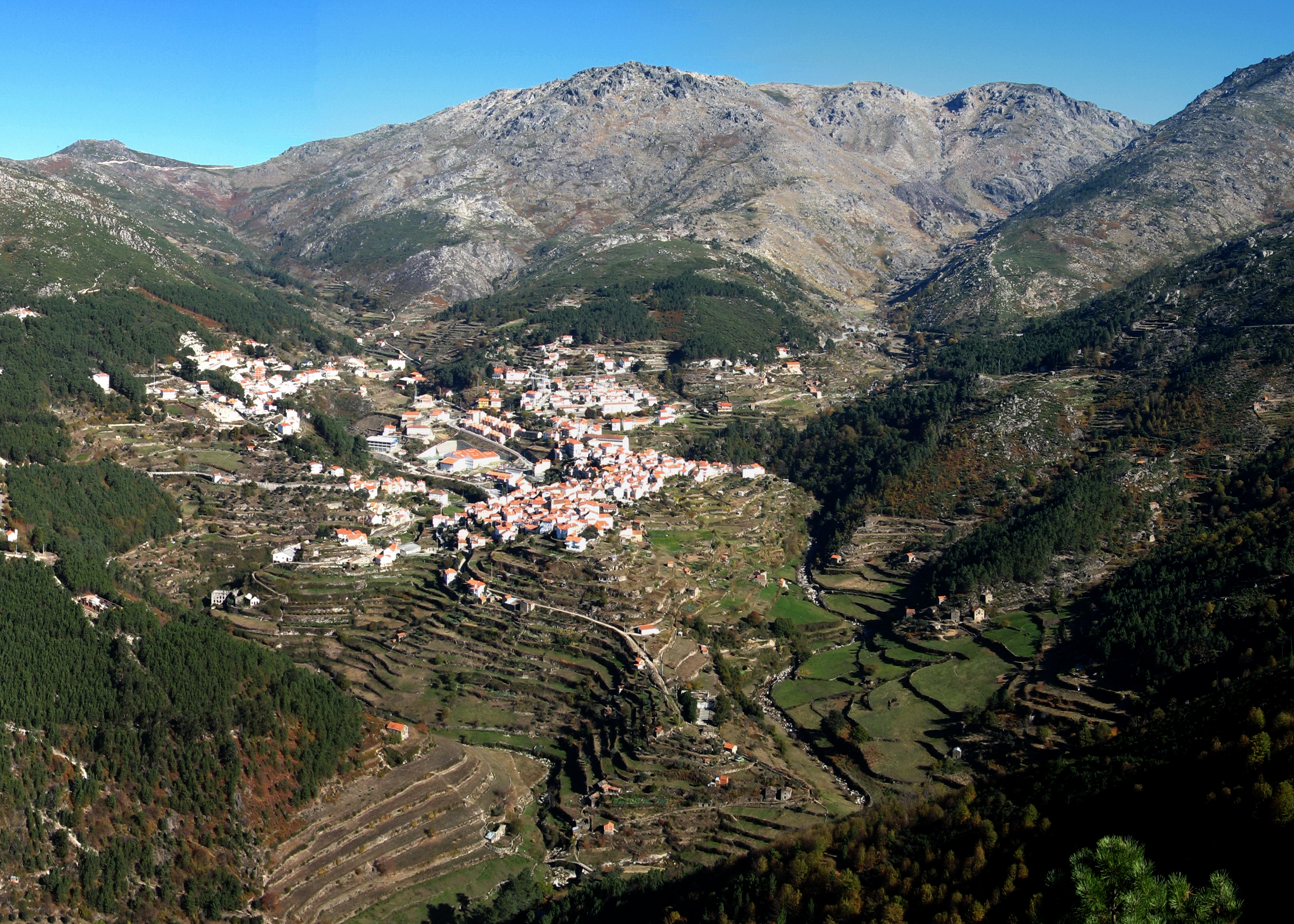

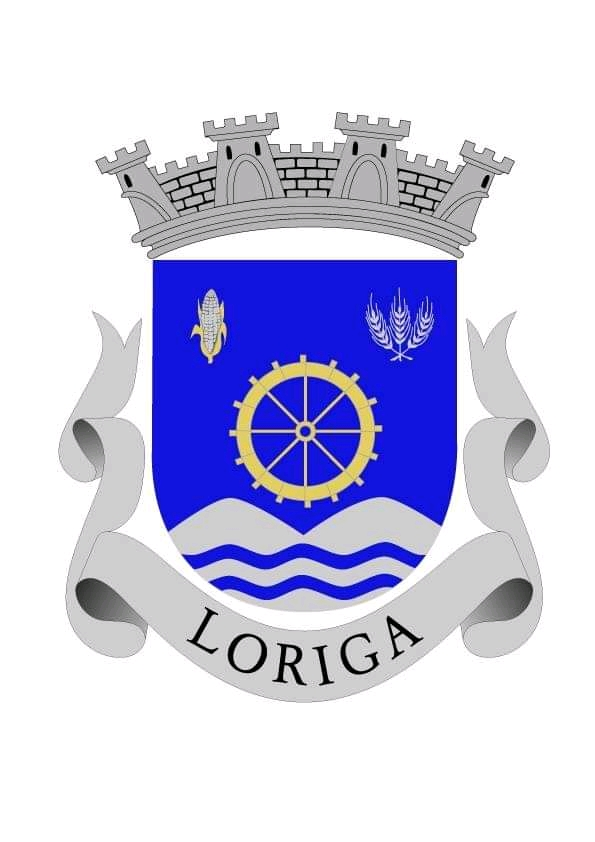
- Flag

- Location in Portugal
- Coordinates: 40.324°N 7.691°W
- Country: Portugal
- Region: Centro
- Intermunic. comm.: Beiras e Serra da Estrela
- District: Guarda
- Municipality: Seia

Area
  - Total: 36.25 km^{2} (14.00 sq mi)
- Elevation: 750 m (2,460 ft)

Population (2011)
  - Total: 1,053
  - Density: 29.05/km^{2} (75.23/sq mi)
- Time zone: UTC+00:00 (WET)
  - Summer (DST): UTC+01:00 (WEST)
- Postal code: 6270
- Area code: 238
- Patron: Santa Maria Maior

Loriga (Portuguese pronunciation: [luˈɾiɡɐ]) is a civil parish (Portuguese: freguesia) and town in south-central part of the municipality of Seia, in central Portugal. Part of the district of Guarda, it is 20 km away from the city of Seia, 40 km away from Viseu, 80 km away from Guarda and 320 km from Lisbon, nestled in the Serra da Estrela mountain range. The population in 2011 was 1,053, in an area of 36.25 km^{2}, including the two localities, the town of Loriga and the village of Fontão.

== History ==
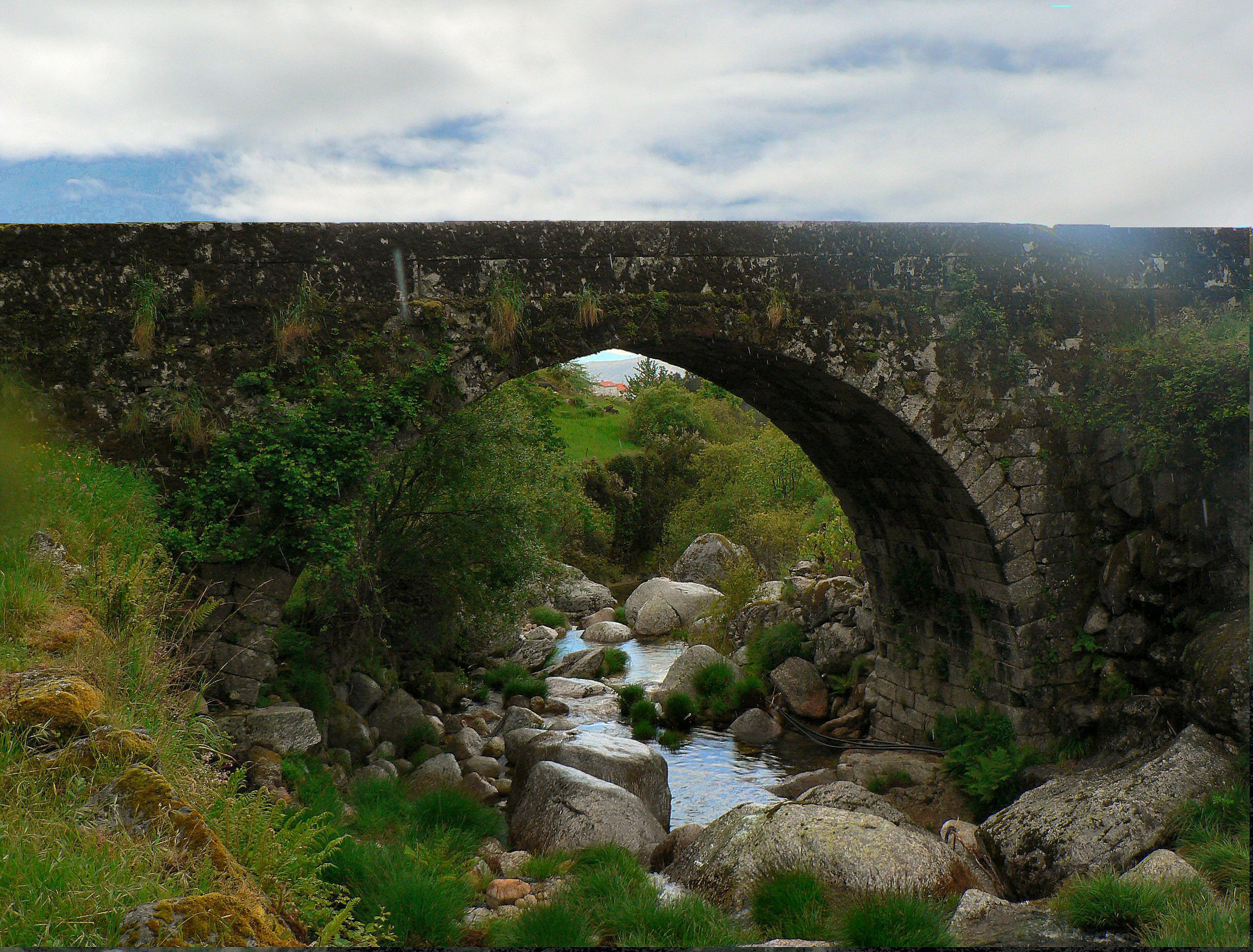
The remaining Roman-era bridge crossing the Ribeira de Loriga

Loriga was founded along a column between ravines where today the historic centre exists. The site was ostensibly selected more than 2000 years ago, owing to its defensibility, the abundance of potable water and pasturelands, and lowlands that provided conditions to practice both hunting and gathering/agriculture.

When the Romans arrived in the region, the settlement was concentrated into two areas. The larger, older and principal agglomeration was situated in the area of the main church and Rua de Viriato, fortified with a wall and palisade. The second group, in the Bairro de São Ginês, were some small homes constructed on the rocky promintory, which were later appropriated by the Visigoths in order to construct a chapel. The 1st-century Roman road and two bridges (the second was destroyed in the 16th century after flooding in the Ribeira de Loriga) connected the outpost of Lorica to the rest of their Lusitanian province. The São Ginês' neighbourhood (São Gens), a local ex-libris, is the location of the chapel of Nossa Senhora do Carmo, an ancient Visigothic chapel.

=== Middle Ages ===
Loriga was the municipal seat since the 12th century, receiving Forals in 1136 (João Rhânia, master of the Terras de Loriga for over two decades, during the reign of Afonso Henriques), 1249 (during the reign of Afonso III), 1474 (under King Afonso V) and finally in 1514 (by King Manuel I).

Loriga was an ecclesiastical parish of the vicarage of the Royal Padroado and its Matriz Church was ordered to construct in 1233, by King Sancho II. This church, was to the invocation of Santa Maria Maior, and constructed over the ancient small Visigothic chapel (there is a lateral block with Visigoth inscriptions visible). Constructed in the Romanesque-style it consists of a three-nave building, with hints of the Old Cathedral of Coimbra. This structure was destroyed during the 1755 earthquake, and only portions of the lateral walls were preserved.

=== Monarchy ===
The 1755 earthquake resulted in significant damage to the town of Loriga, destroying homes and the parochial residence, in addition to opening-up cracks and faults in the town's larger buildings, such as the historic municipal council hall (constructed in the 13th century). An emissary of the Marquess of Pombal visited Loriga to evaluate the damage (something that did not happen in other nearby biggest parishes, like Covilhã) and provide support.

The residents of Loriga supported the Asolutionist forces of the Infante Miguel of Portugal against the Liberals, during the Portuguese Liberal Wars. It ceased to be the seat of a municipality in 1855 after the application of a territorial planning carried out during the 19th century, interestingly the same plan that gave rise to the Districts.

At the time of its municipal demise (October 1855), the municipality of Loriga included the parishes of Alvoco da Serra, Cabeça, Sazes da Beira, Teixeira, Valezim and Vide, as well as thirty other disincorporated villages.

Loriga was an industrial centre for textile manufacturing during the 19th century. It was one of the few industrialized centres of the region, even supplanting Seia until the middle of the 20th century. Only Covilhã out-performed Loriga in terms of businesses operating from its lands; companies such as Regato, Redondinha, Fonte dos Amores, Tapadas, Fândega, Leitão & Irmãos, Augusto Luís Mendes, Lamas, Nunes Brito, Moura Cabral and Lorimalhas, among others. The main roadway in Loriga, Avenida Augusto Luís Mendes, is named for one of the villages most illustrious industrialists. The wool industry started to decline during the last decades of the 20th century, a factor that aggravated and accelerated the decline of the region.

== Geography ==
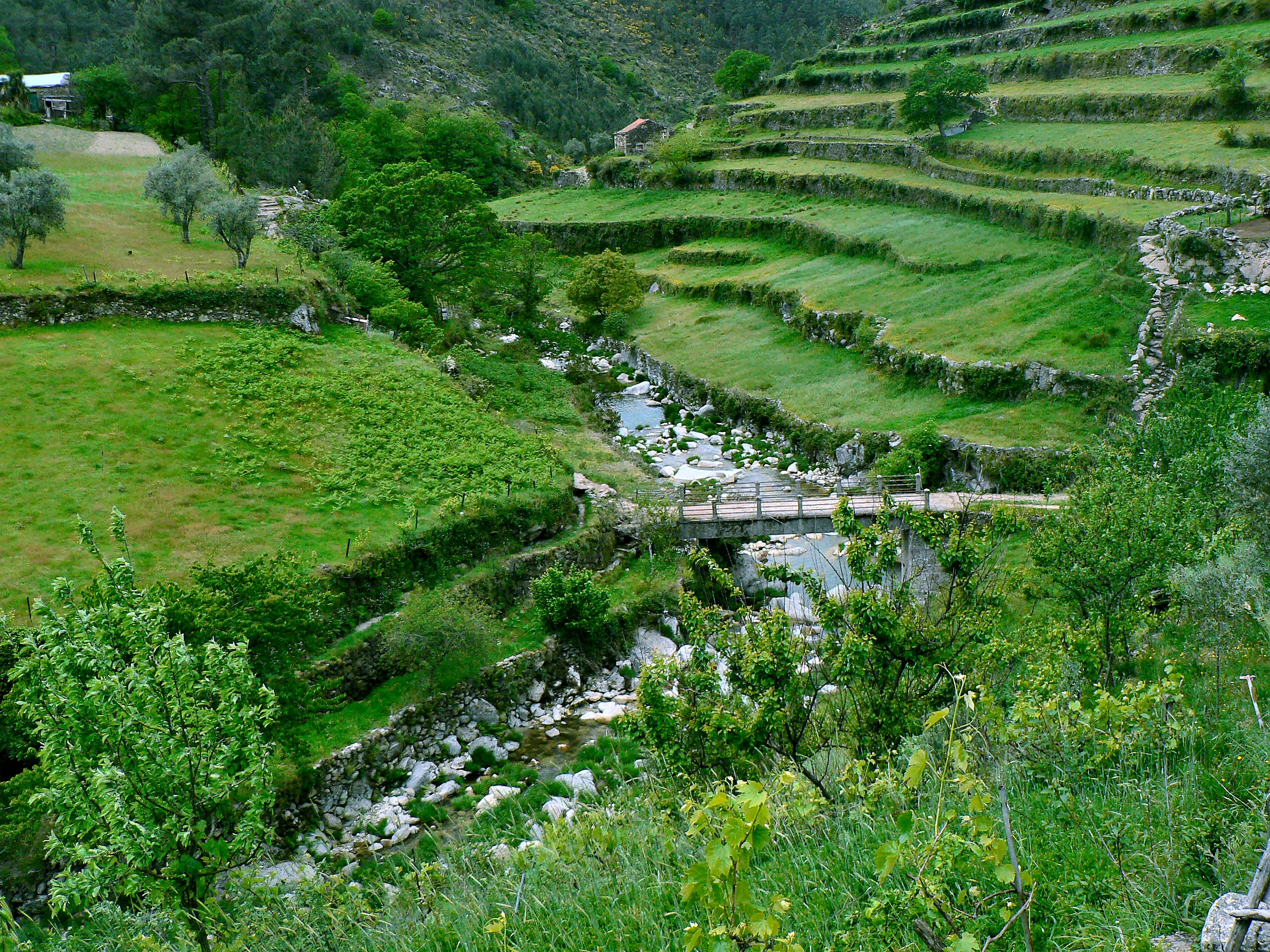
A bridge over a ravine in Loriga, with the pastures of the valley landscape

Known locally as the "Portuguese Switzerland" due to its landscape that includes a principal settlement nestled in the mountains of the Serra da Estrela Natural Park. It is located in the south-central part of the municipality of Seia, along the southeast part of the Serra, between several ravines, but specifically the Ribeira de São Bento and Ribeira da Nave; it is 20 kilometres from Seia, 80 kilometres from Guarda and 300 kilometres from the national capital (Lisbon). A main town is accessible by the national roadway E.N. 231, that connects directly to the region of the Serra da Estrela by way of E.N.338 (which was completed in 2006), or through the E.N.339, a 9.2 kilometre access that transits some of the main elevations (960 metres near Portela do Arão, and 1650 metres around the Lagoa Comprida).

The region is carved by U-shaped glacial valleys, modelled by the movement of ancient glaciers. The main valley, Vale de Loriga was carved by longitudinal abrasion that also created rounded pockets, where the glacial resistance was minor. Starting at an altitude of 1991 metres along the Serra da Estrela the valley descends abruptly until 290 metres above sea level (around Vide), passing villages such as Cabeça, Casal do Rei and Muro. The central town, Loriga, is seven kilometres from Torre (the highest point), but the parish is sculpted by cliffs, alluvial plains and glacial lakes deposited during millennia of glacial erosion, and surrounded by rare ancient forest that surrounded the lateral flanks of these glaciers.

== Economy ==
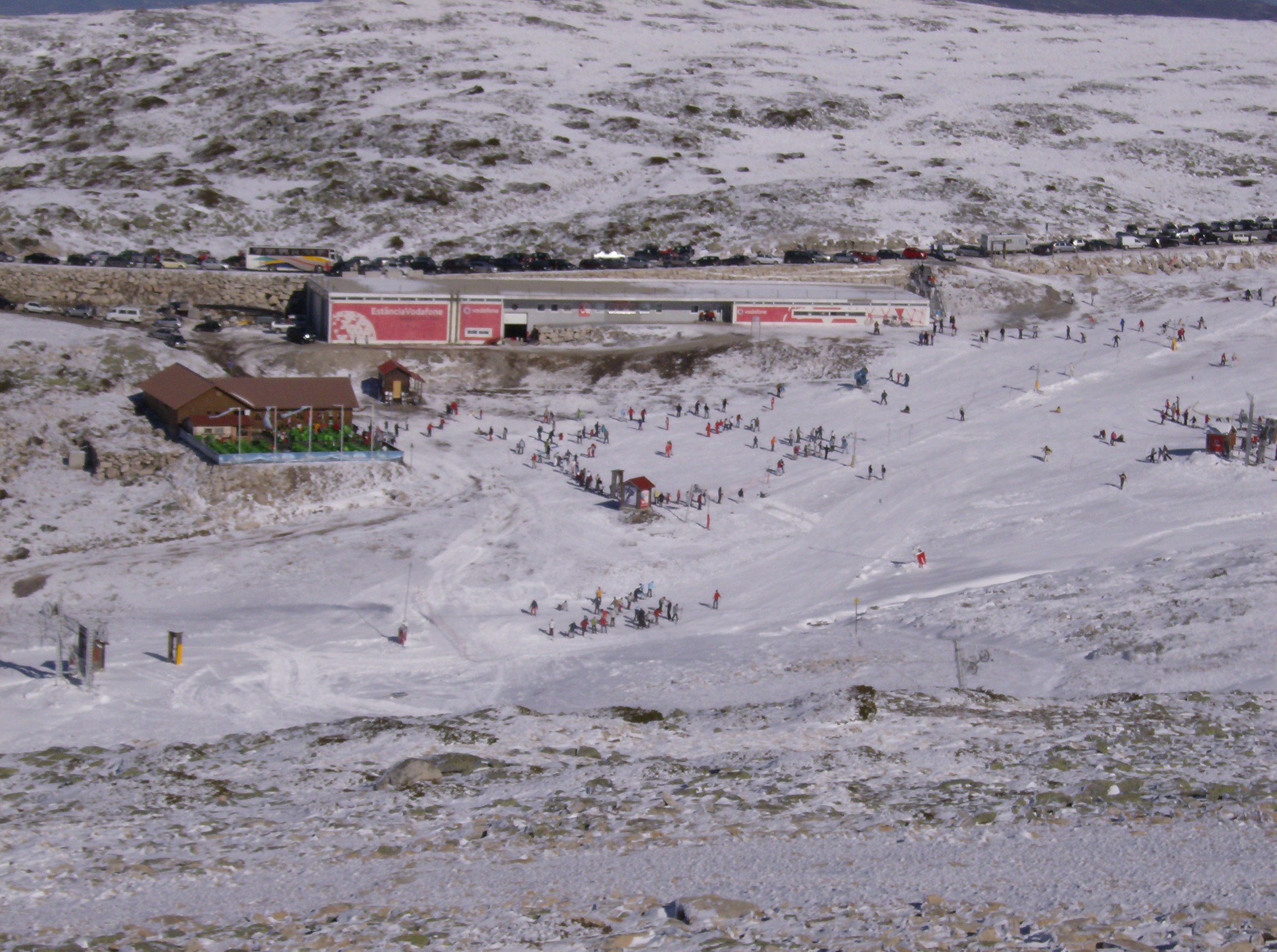
Vodafone Ski Resort, Serra da Estrela, in the town of Loriga.

Textiles are the principal local export; Loriga was a hub the textile and wool industries during the mid-19th century, in addition to being subsistence agriculture responsible for the cultivation of corn. The Loriguense economy is based on metallurgical industries, bread-making, commercial shops, restaurants and agricultural support services.

While that textile industry has since dissipated, the town began to attract a tourist trade due to its proximity to the Serra da Estrela and Vodafone Ski Resort (the only ski center in Portugal), which was constructed totally within the parish limits.
