= Estrela Mountain Dog =

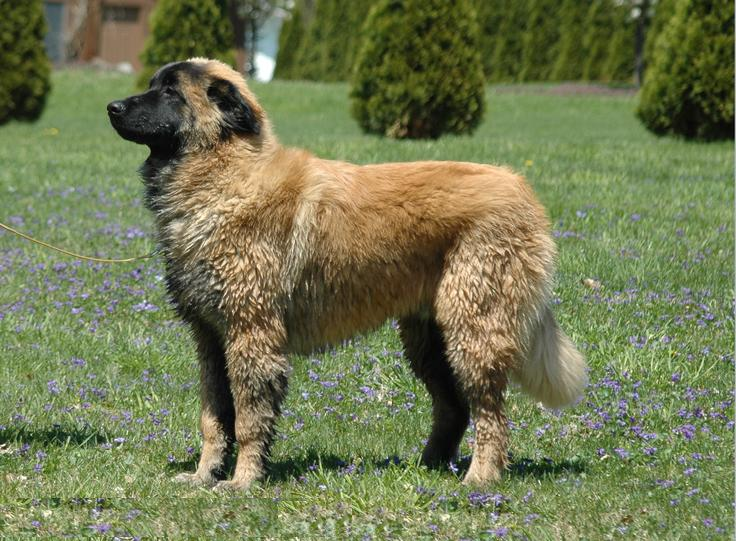
- A young dog

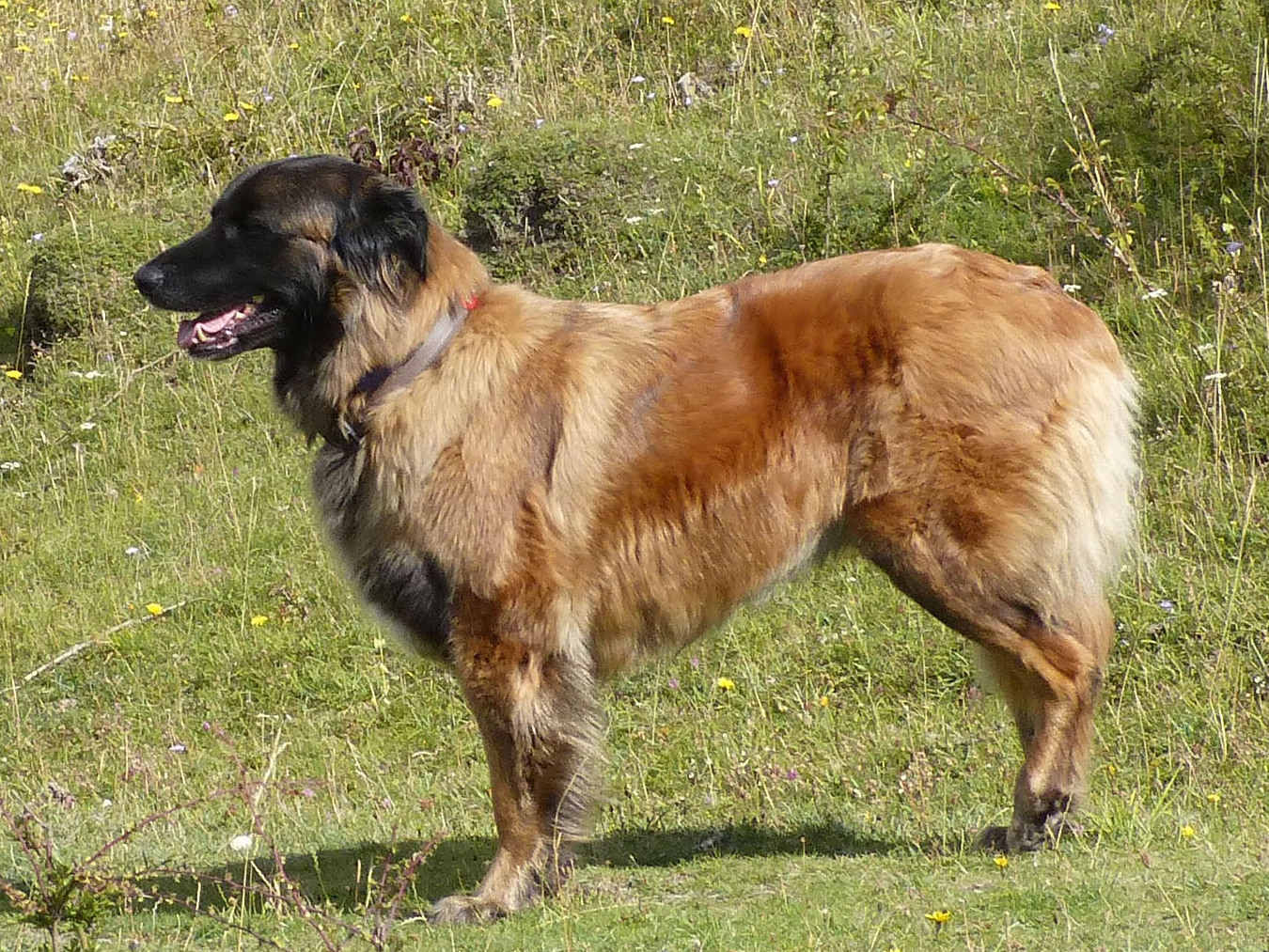
- Female
- Other names: Cão da Serra da Estrela
- Origin: Portugal
Traits
Height	Males	65–75 cm (26–30 in)
	Females	62–71 cm (24–28 in)
Weight	Males	45–60 kg (99–132 lb)
	Females	35–45 kg (77–99 lb)
- Coat: either long or short, with thick undercoat
- Colour: fawn, grey or yellow in any shade, either solid or brindled; wolf-grey with fawn, grey or yellow tones
Kennel club standards
- Clube Português de Canicultura: standard
- Associação Portuguesa do Cão da Serra da Estrela: standard
- Fédération Cynologique Internationale: standard

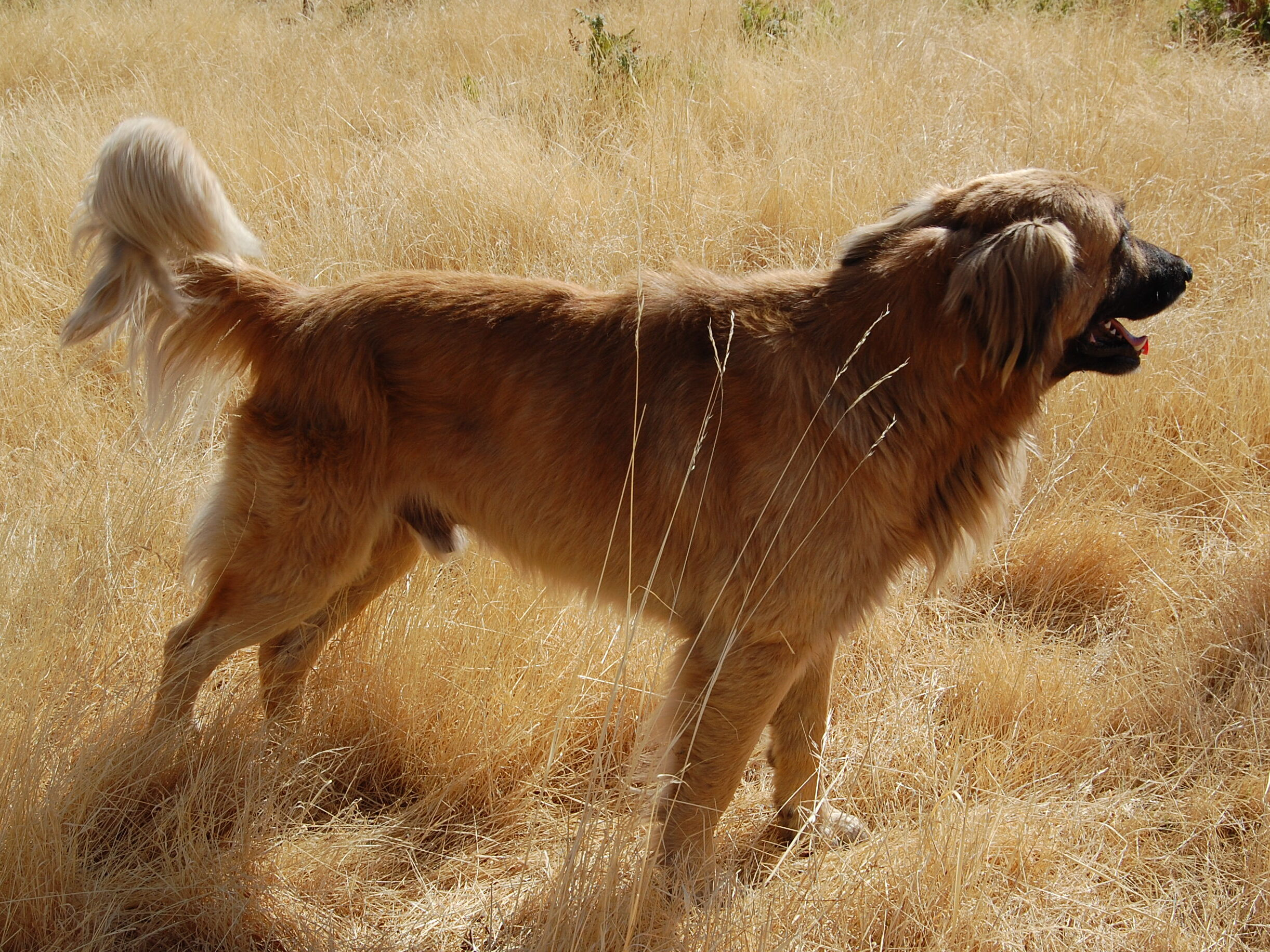
Flock guardian in the Parque Natural da Serra da Estrela

The Estrela Mountain Dog or Cão da Serra da Estrela is a Portuguese breed of large flock guardian dog indigenous to the Serra da Estrela mountain range in central Portugal.

== History ==
The breed has been developed in the mountains of Serra da Estrela, in what is now Portugal. A breed society, the Associação Portuguesa do Cão da Serra da Estrela, was established in Lisbon in December 1986; the statutes of the association were published early the next year in the Diário da República, the official gazette of the Republic.

== Use ==
In the twenty-first century, some of the dogs have been used to protect flocks from Iberian wolves – which are themselves a protected species.
