= Penhas da Saúde =

Village in Portugal

Coordinates: 40°18′N 7°33′W

- Village
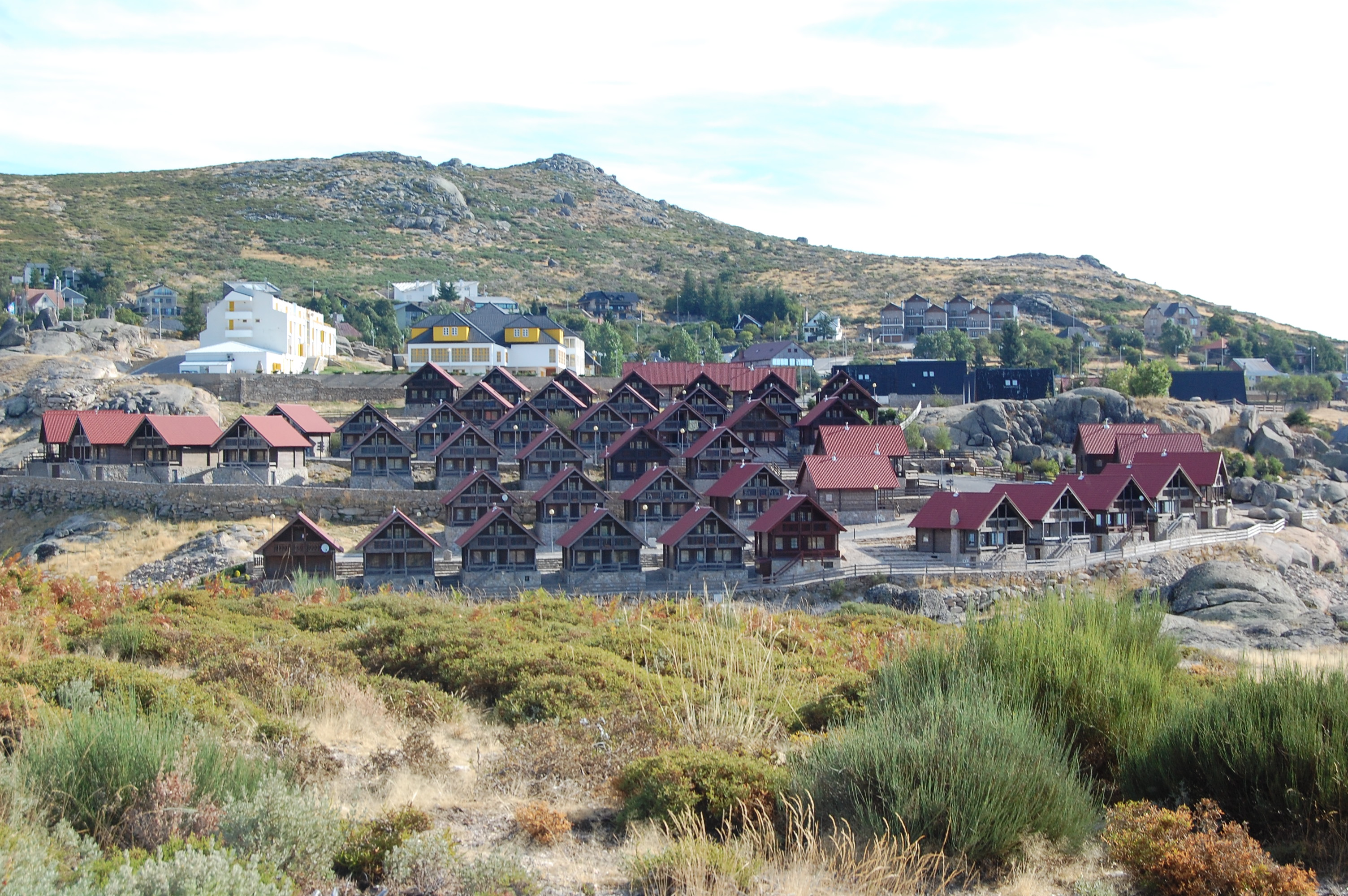
- Penhas da Saúde, September 2010
- Interactive map of Penhas da Saúde
- Country: Portugal
- Municipality: Covilhã
- District: Castelo Branco District
- Elevation: 1,500 m (4,900 ft)

Penhas da Saúde (Portuguese pronunciation: [ˈpeɲɐʒ ðɐ sɐˈuðɨ]) is a village in the municipality of Covilhã, Portugal. This mountain village sits right in the heart of Serra da Estrela, nestled within the scenic mountain range, at an altitude of 1,500 metres (4,900 ft). It is primarily a winter resort.

== Winter resort ==
The tourism facilities in Penhas da Saúde consists of the Serra da Estrela Hotel, a youth hostel and the Mountain Chalets, 10 minutes away from the Serra da Estrela Ski Resort. Slightly below the village, overlooking Cova da Beira, sits the typical Estalagem Varanda dos Carqueijais.

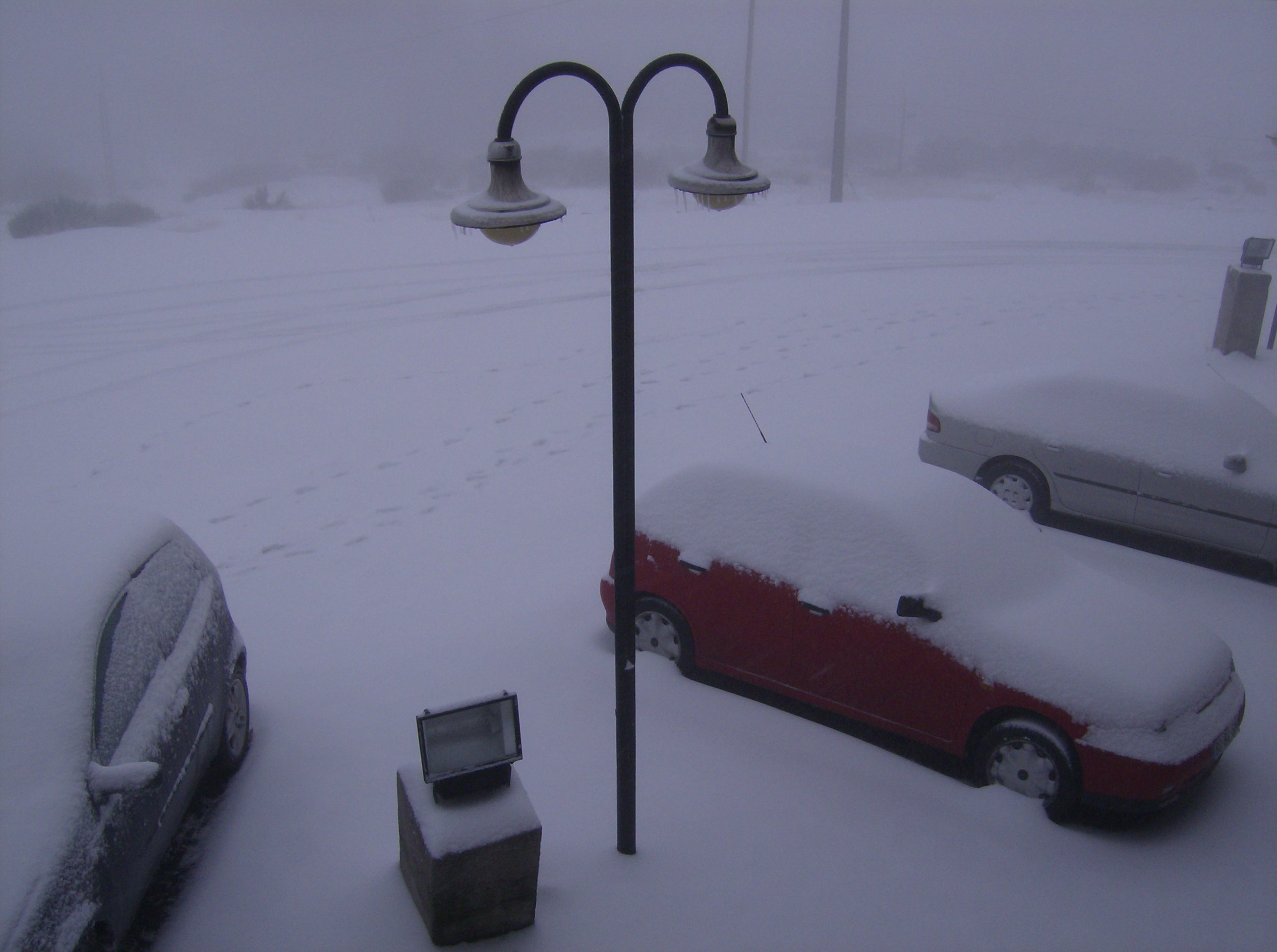
A blizzard in Penhas da Saúde

The ski resort is located at the Torre Plateau (the highest point of mainland Portugal), about 10 km away from Penhas da Saúde, in the neighbouring municipality of Seia, and at an altitude of approximately 2,000 metres. Covered in snow from December to April, also with the help of snow cannons, it houses support infrastructures for the practice of winter sports and provides facilities such as mechanical lifts and a pass identification system for the lifts; being the primary destination in Portugal for the practice of winter sports and entertainment.

Activities include dog sledding, sleighing and snowmobile rides. A range of equipment, such as alpine skis and snowboards can be rented locally.

== Geography ==
=== Climate ===
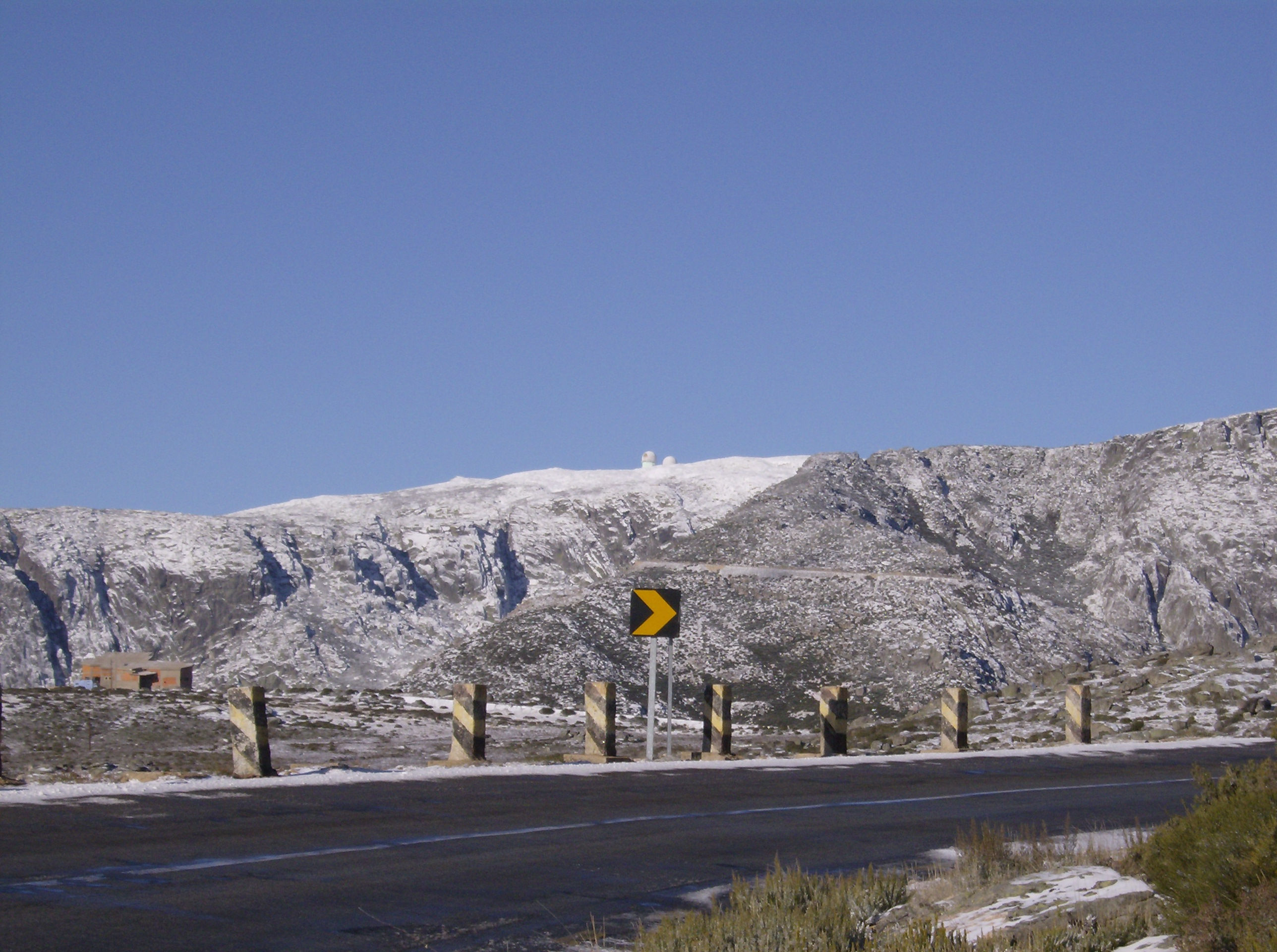
Torre, the highest point of Mainland Portugal, view from Penhas da Saúde

Penhas da Saúde (meaning Cliffs of the Health in English) has a cool-summer Mediterranean climate (Csb, according to the Köppen climate classification), with oceanic (Cfb) influences. There is a short dry season in summer, and high precipitation in the remaining of the year.

Summers are pleasant and winters are chilly, with frequent snowfalls, sometimes with very significant accumulations. The warmest month is August, with an average temperature of 16.5 °C (62 °F). In January, the coldest month, the average temperature is 1.6 °C (35 °F). The average yearly temperature in Penhas da Saúde is 7.8 °C (46 °F) and the average annual precipitation is close to 3,000 mm (118 in).

Climate data for Penhas da Saúde, precipitation 1951-1980, elevation: 1,560 m or 5,120 ft
| Month | Jan | Feb | Mar | Apr | May | Jun | Jul | Aug | Sep | Oct | Nov | Dec | Year |
|---|---|---|---|---|---|---|---|---|---|---|---|---|---|
| Mean daily maximum °C (°F) | 4.4 (39.9) | 5.0 (41.0) | 6.4 (43.5) | 8.8 (47.8) | 11.5 (52.7) | 17.2 (63.0) | 20.8 (69.4) | 21.1 (70.0) | 17.3 (63.1) | 12.1 (53.8) | 7.1 (44.8) | 4.8 (40.6) | 11.4 (52.5) |
| Daily mean °C (°F) | 1.6 (34.9) | 2.0 (35.6) | 3.2 (37.8) | 5.2 (41.4) | 7.8 (46.0) | 12.9 (55.2) | 16.1 (61.0) | 16.5 (61.7) | 13.3 (55.9) | 8.9 (48.0) | 4.3 (39.7) | 2.1 (35.8) | 7.8 (46.1) |
| Mean daily minimum °C (°F) | −1.1 (30.0) | −1.0 (30.2) | 0.1 (32.2) | 1.7 (35.1) | 4.1 (39.4) | 8.7 (47.7) | 11.4 (52.5) | 11.9 (53.4) | 9.4 (48.9) | 5.8 (42.4) | 1.5 (34.7) | −0.6 (30.9) | 4.3 (39.8) |
| Average precipitation mm (inches) | 436.3 (17.18) | 367.5 (14.47) | 336.9 (13.26) | 223.4 (8.80) | 222.4 (8.76) | 119.7 (4.71) | 27.8 (1.09) | 30.6 (1.20) | 110.9 (4.37) | 306.7 (12.07) | 391.3 (15.41) | 391.5 (15.41) | 2,965 (116.73) |
Source 1: INMG
Source 2: Climate-data.org

== Sources ==
- (in English and Portuguese) Câmara Municipal da Covilhã (Covilhã City Hall)
