= Covão dos Conchos =

Artificial lake in Portugal

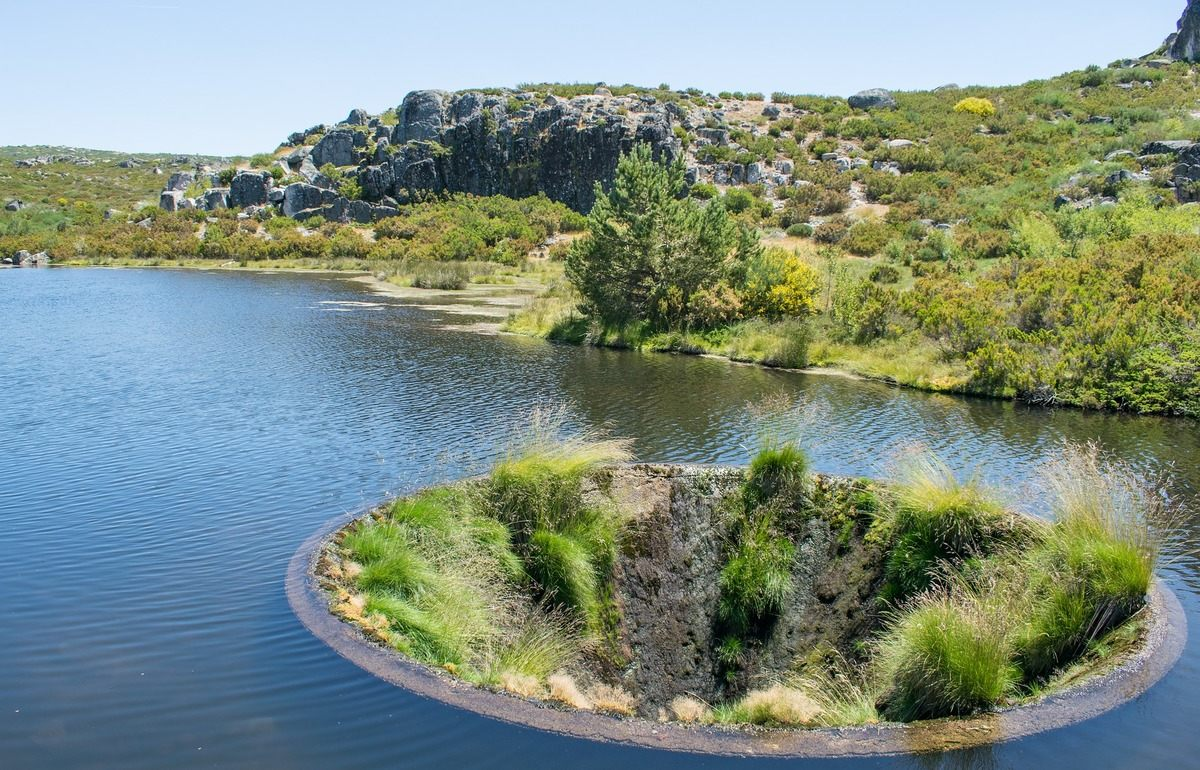
- Interactive map of Covão dos Conchos
- Country: Portugal
- Location: Serra da Estrela mountains
- Coordinates: 40.3639°N 7.6109°W
- Status: Non Operational
- Opening date: 1955

Dam and spillways
- Spillway type: Bell-Mouth

Covão dos Conchos is an artificial lake in the Serra da Estrela mountains in Portugal that is famous for its bell-mouth spillway.

The spillway was built in 1955 with the aim of diverting water from Ribeira das Naves to Lagoa Comprida. It is a part of a hydro-electric dam system of Serra da Estrela. The conical spillway was little-known until photos of the hole went viral in 2016. Over the last 60 years moss and foliage has grown onto the mouth of the funnel, creating an eye-catching sight. It has a height of 4.6 meters and has a circumference of 48 meters. The tunnel that collects the water is 1,519 meters long.
