= Serra da Estrela Natural Park =

Protected area in Portugal

- IUCN category V (protected landscape/seascape)
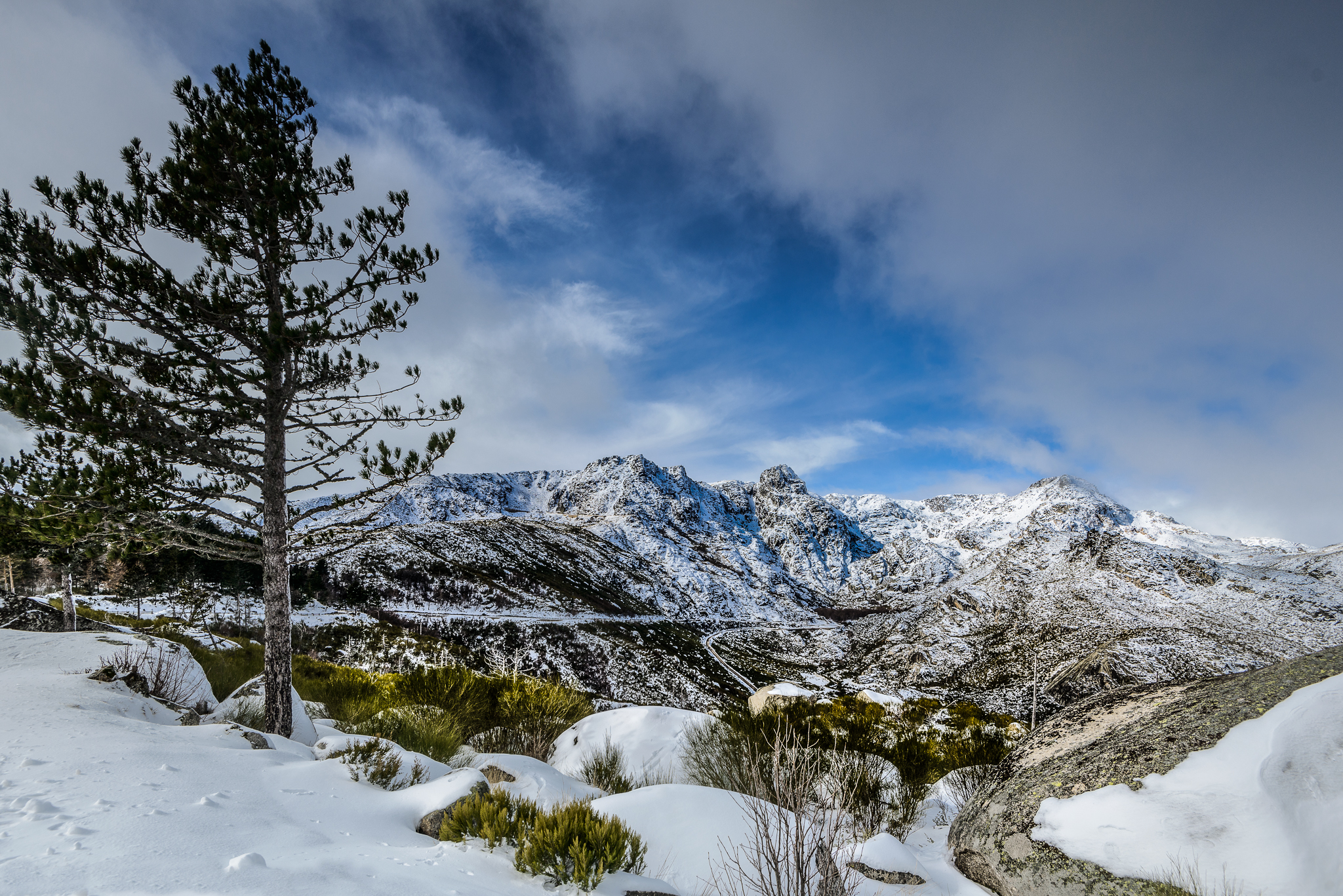

- Location within Portugal
- Location: Central Region, Portugal
- Coordinates: 40°24′21″N 7°32′15″W
- Area: 891.32 km^{2} (344.14 sq mi)
- Max. elevation: 1,991 m (6,532 ft)
- Min. elevation: 291 m (955 ft)
- Established: July 16, 1976
- Visitors: 7,596 (in 2017-2020 (average))
- Governing body: ICNF

Ramsar Wetland
- Official name: Estrela Mountain upper Plateau and upper Zêzere River
- Designated: 2 December 2005
- Reference no.: 1614

Serra da Estrela Natural Park or Parque Natural da Serra da Estrela is a nature reserve in the largest mountain range in Portugal - the Serra da Estrela – and is the source of the rivers Mondego, Zêzere (tributary of the Tagus), and Alva. The park is the largest natural conservation area in Portugal and occupies about 1,000 km^{2}. More than half of its area is located at altitudes higher than 700 m. At 1,993 m it contains the highest peak in Continental Portugal (named Torre) and a ski resort, the Serra da Estrela Ski Resort.

During the Quaternary period, the entire region was subjected to the action of ice and once this disappeared visible marks were left on the landscape. Valleys in the shape of horseshoes, ravines, polished rocks and lakes of glacial origin are just some of the formations that demonstrate the importance of the ice and snow in modelling the mountains.

== Geography ==
The central plateau, dominated by the 7 m Torre (Tower) and Cântaros, location of the glacial valley of the Zêzere, contrasts with another mountain, the Videmonte plateau, which is still in the initial bed of the Mondego, dotted with isolated farms among fields of rye and pastures where cattle are bred. In the valleys to the south west, decorated by terraces and surrounded by the Penha dos Abutres, are the villages of Loriga and Alvoco, which have developed on powerful rocky spurs. Finally, the north west slope stretches from below Seia to the land dominated by the castle of Linhares and the fields where maize is cultivated and vines are planted up the slopes to where the broom grows.

== Fauna ==
In terms of fauna, the presence of the bear is a thing of the past and even wolves only roam here sporadically. In addition to the wall lizard that is a feature of the region, other species include otters, genets, badgers, wild cats, water voles, red breasted bullfinches, Algerian wall lizards and midwife frogs.

== Flora ==
The natural vegetation appears in three separate sectors. Under 900 m, in very clearly defined areas. Between 800/900 m and 1600 m is the domain of the black oak. From 1600 m upwards, we find the juniper and the high pastures where the gentian, a plant in danger of extinction, can be found.

== Human occupation ==
The villages in the Serra da Estrela Natural Park area are mainly at the bottom of the mountains and date back to medieval times. However, before this other cultures left their mark on this area. One of the most notable examples of the Roman presence are the remains at Famalicão and Folgosinho, of the road that connected Mérida to Braga. The route by which it crosses the mountain would certainly have caused difficulties in construction. The Arab influence is seen in the irrigation system and the fruit orchards while the Visigothic culture organized all rural space by applying the Visigoth Code.

== Economy ==
Throughout the Natural Park, a traditional mountain economy is practised, centred on agriculture, shepherding of sheep and goats, particularly domestic sheep and the manufacture of Serra da Estrela cheese. The craftsmanship of the region is expressed in basket work using chestnut and wicker, weaving, embroidered cotton and smoked produce.

As the population of the Natural Park ages, locals have turned to other means, such as tourism, to preserve their economy and cultural traditions.

== Gallery ==
Serra da Estrela

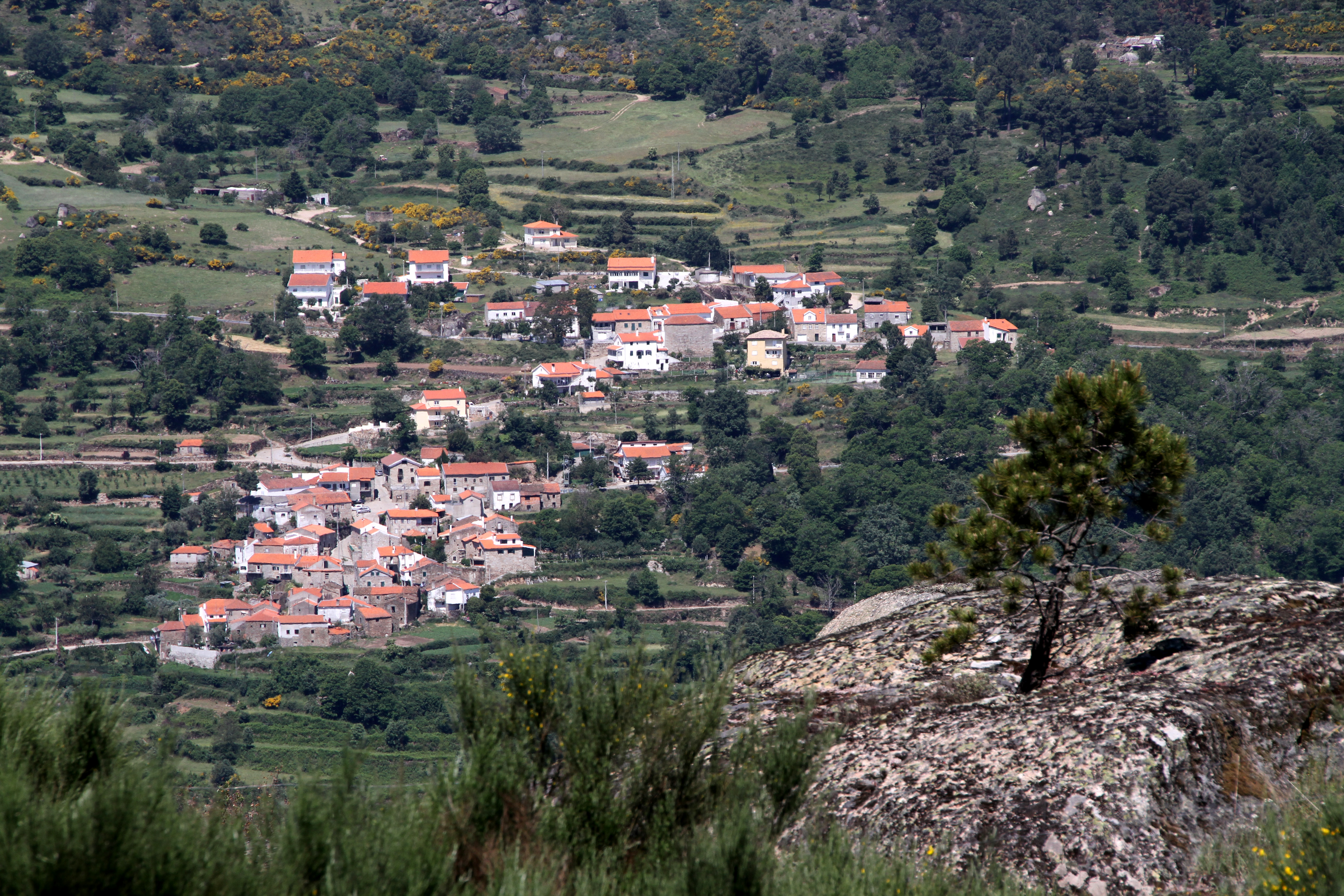

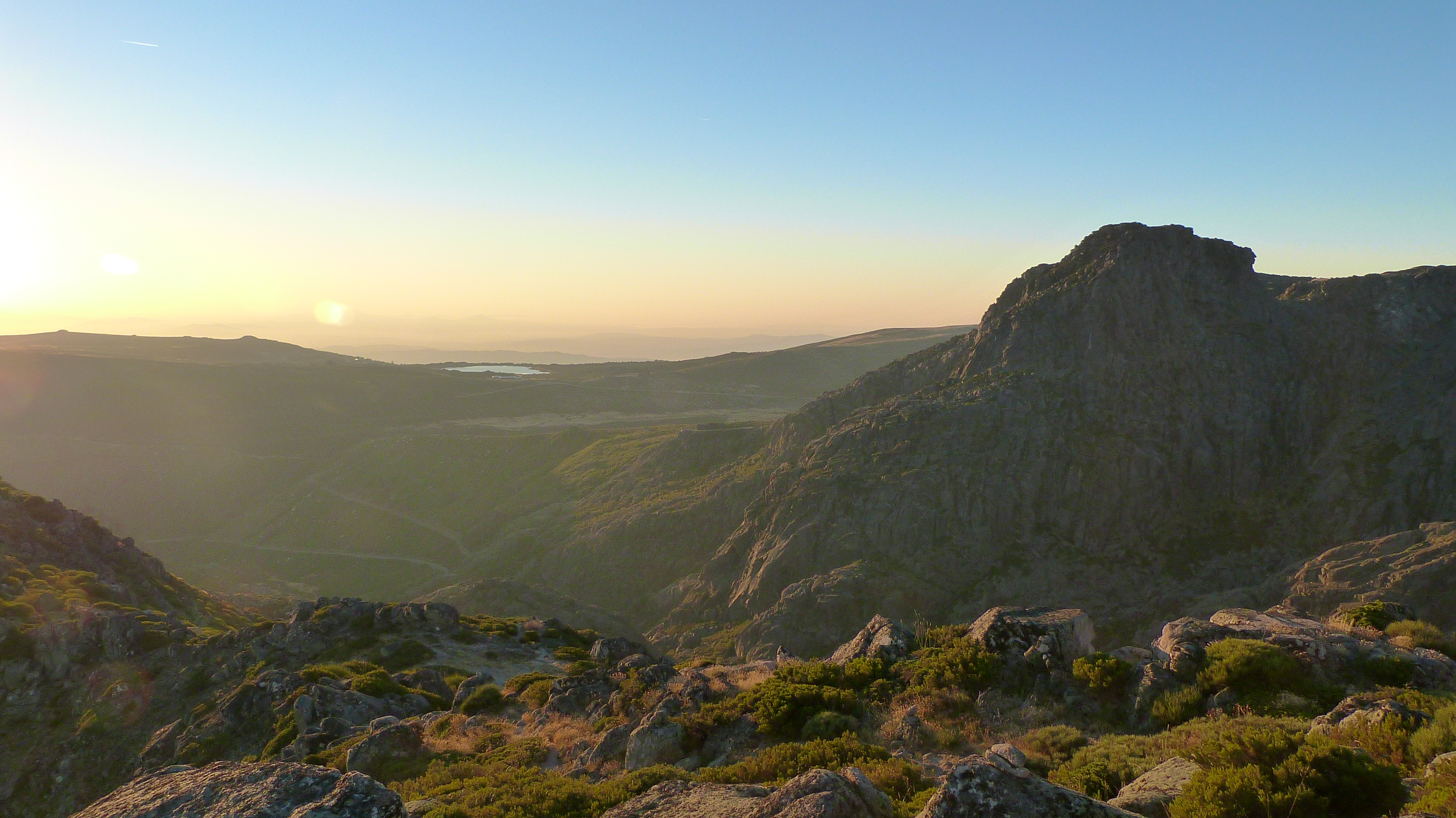

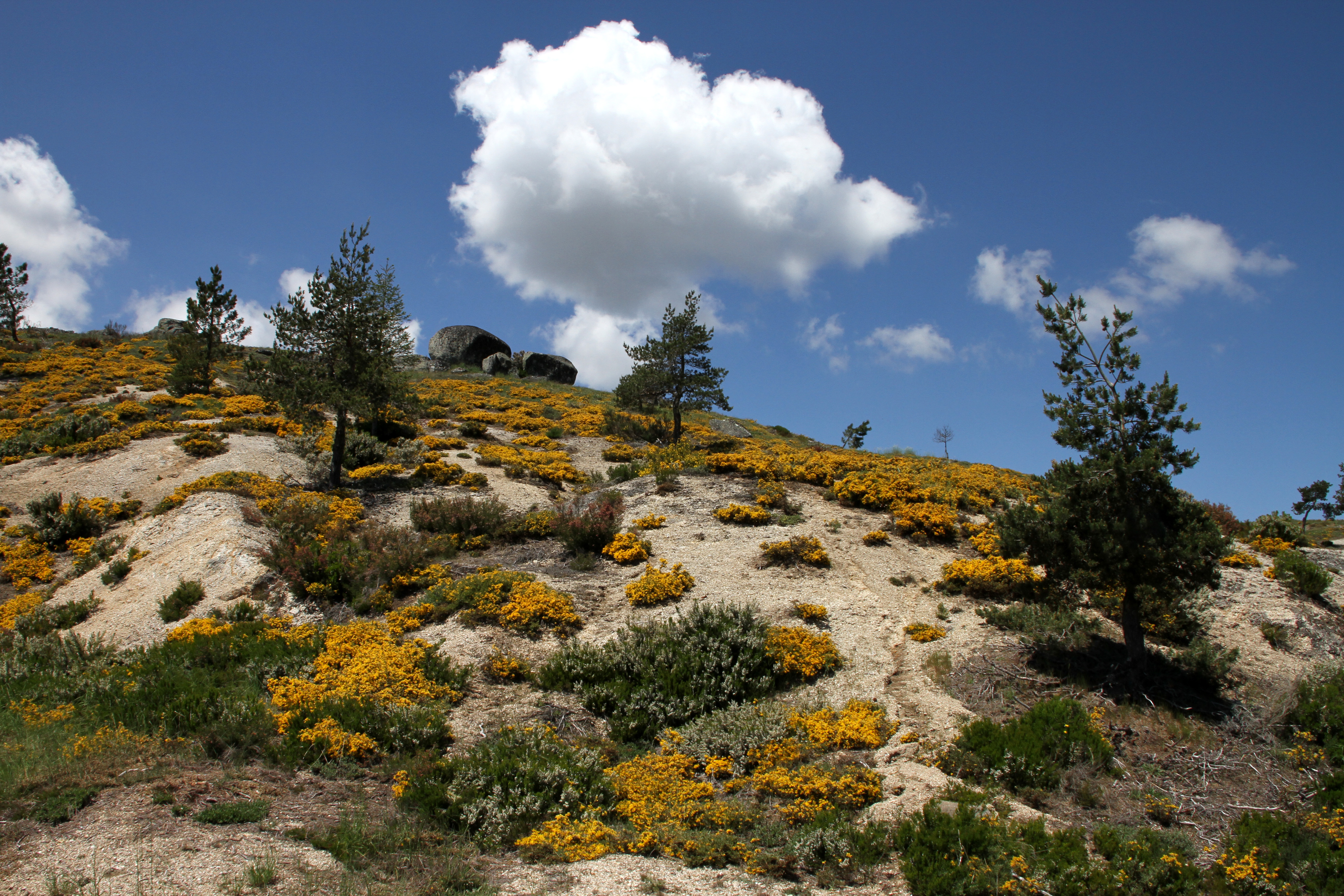

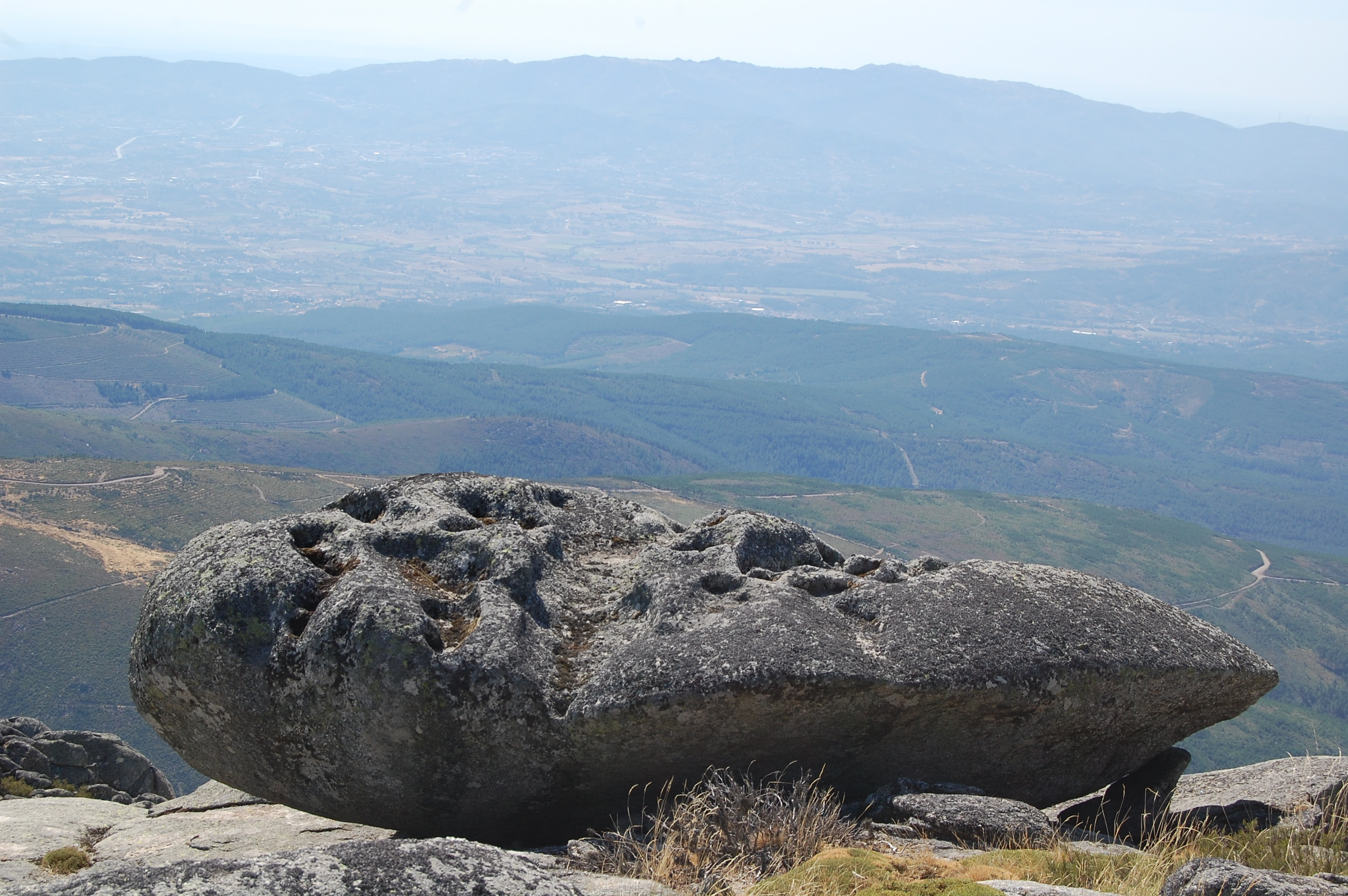

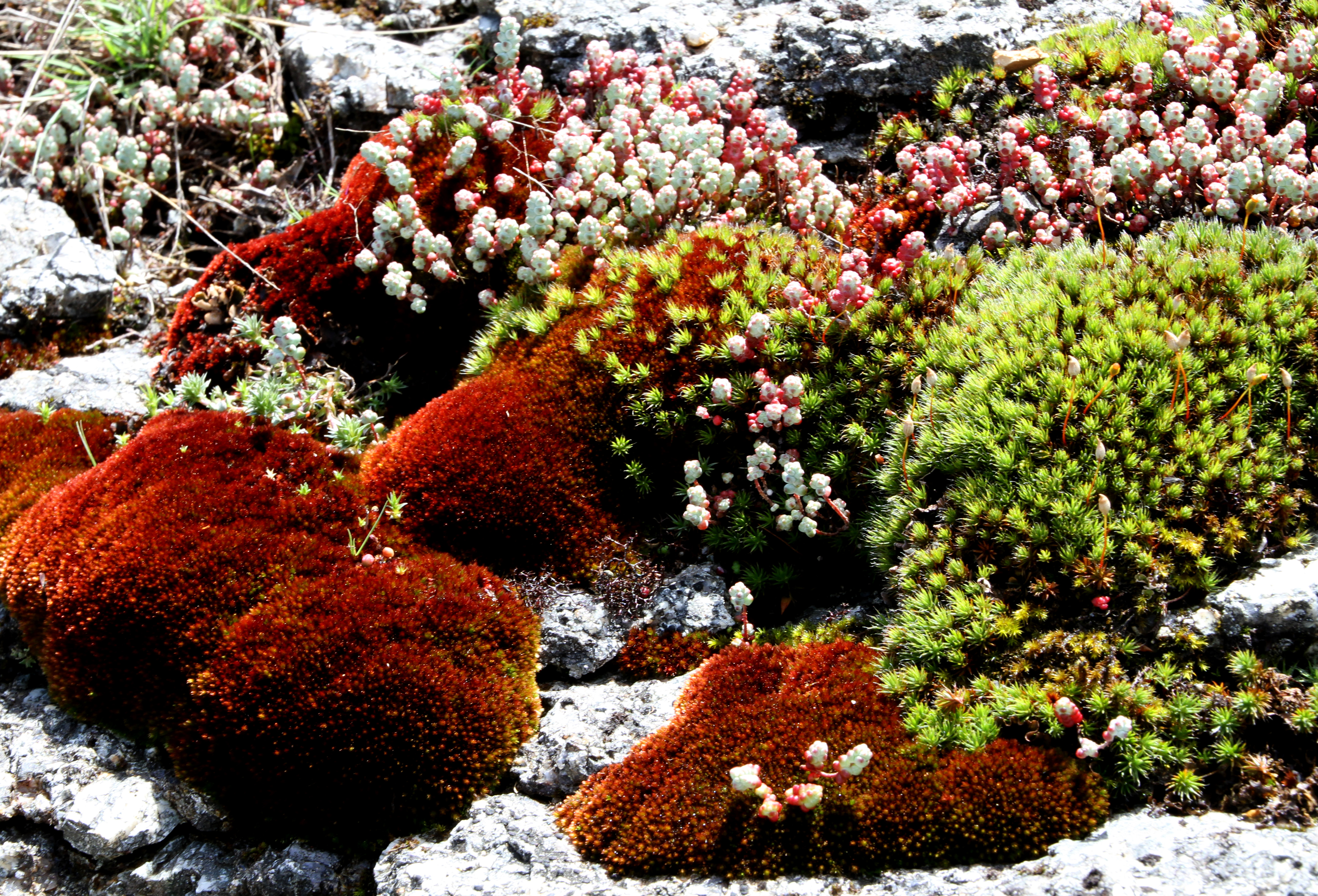

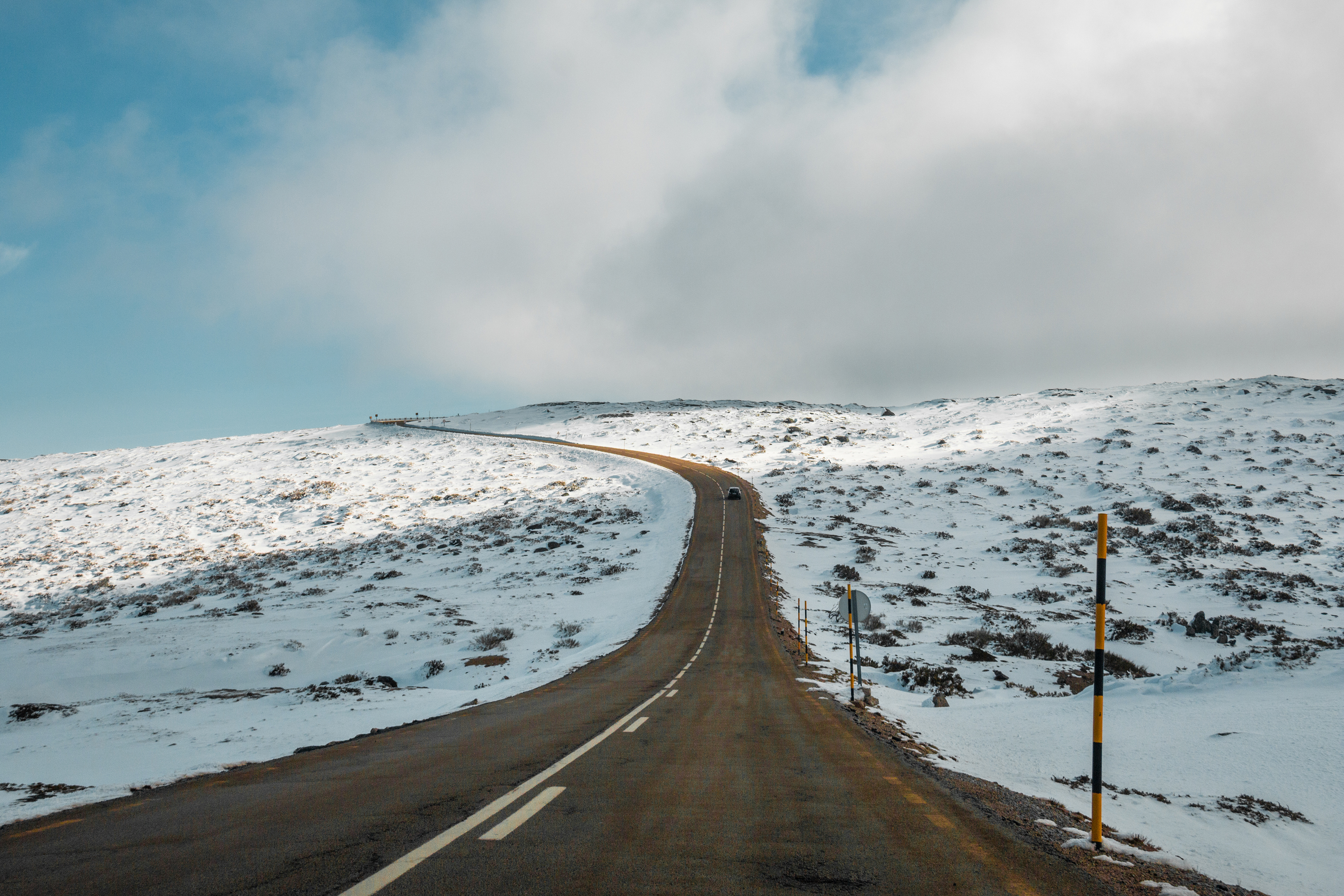

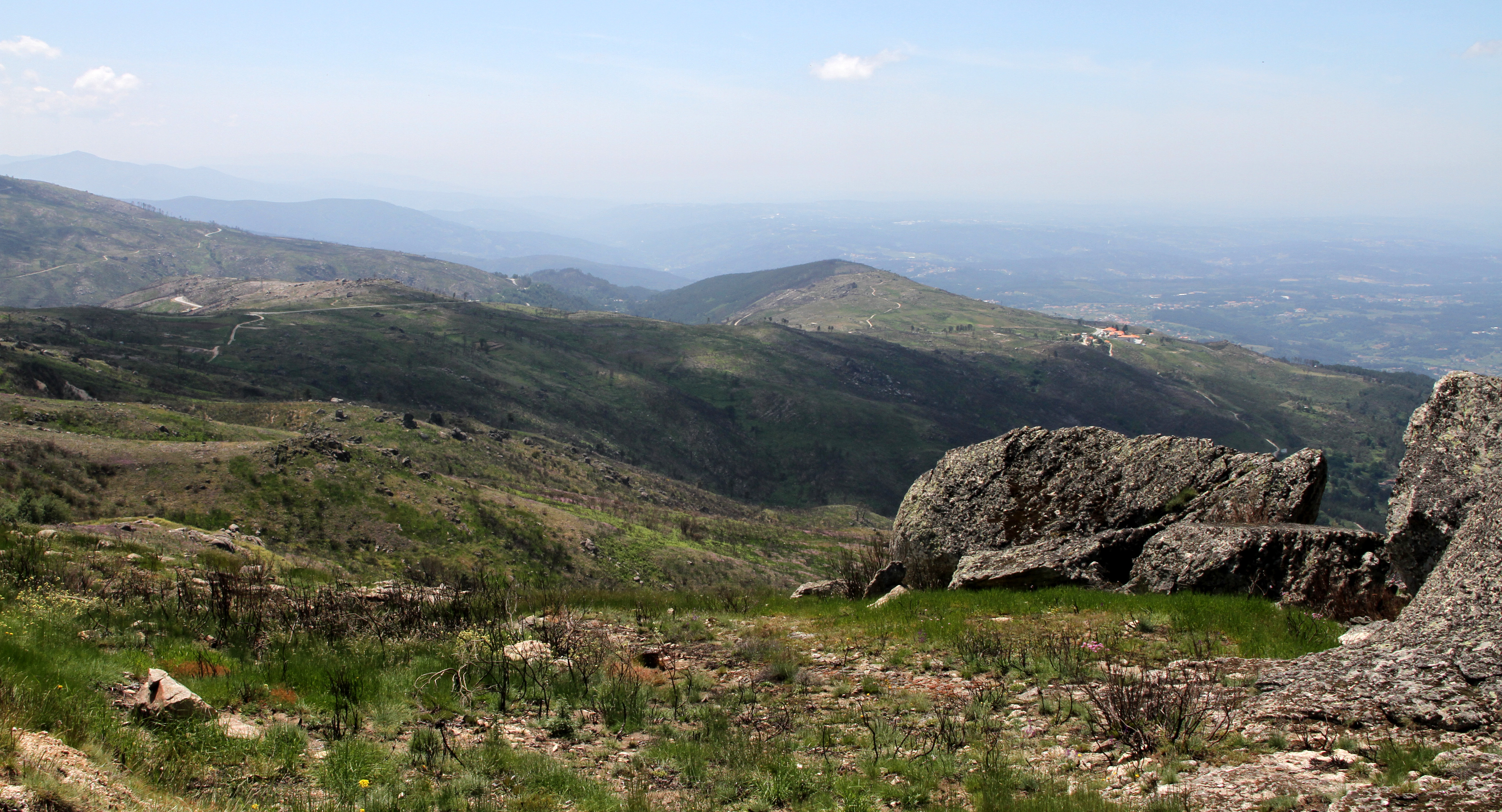

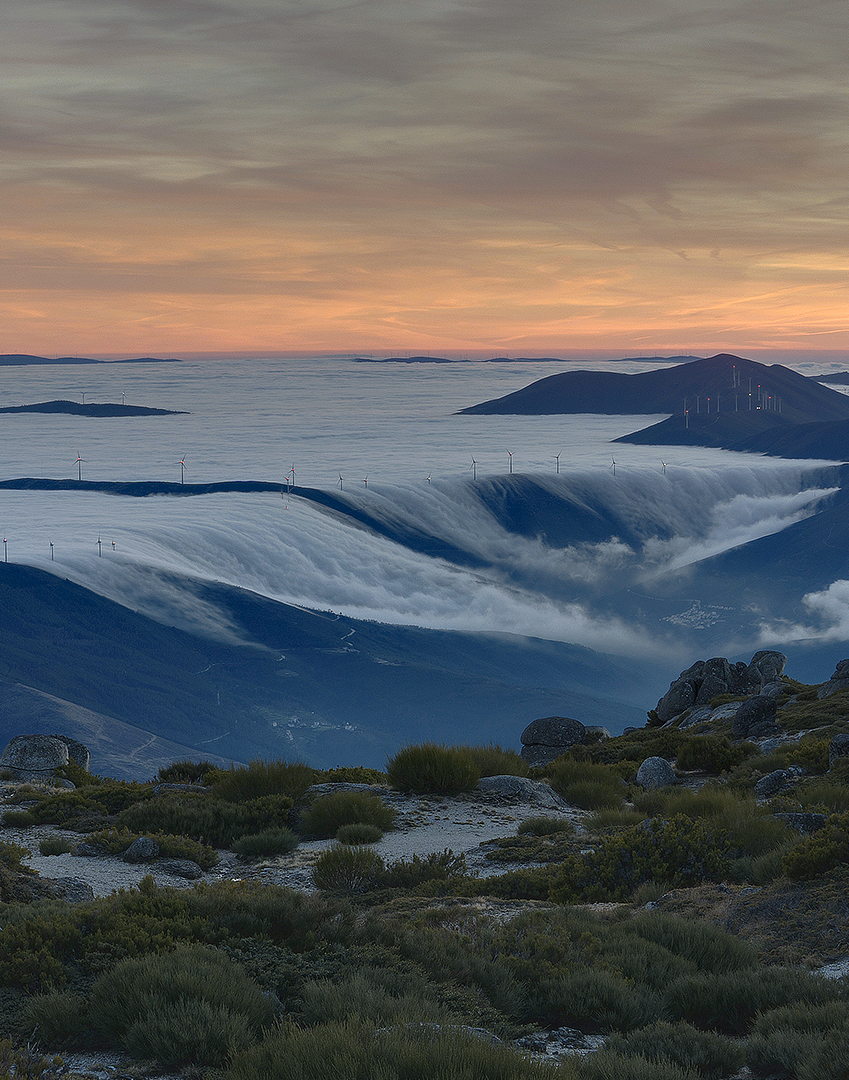

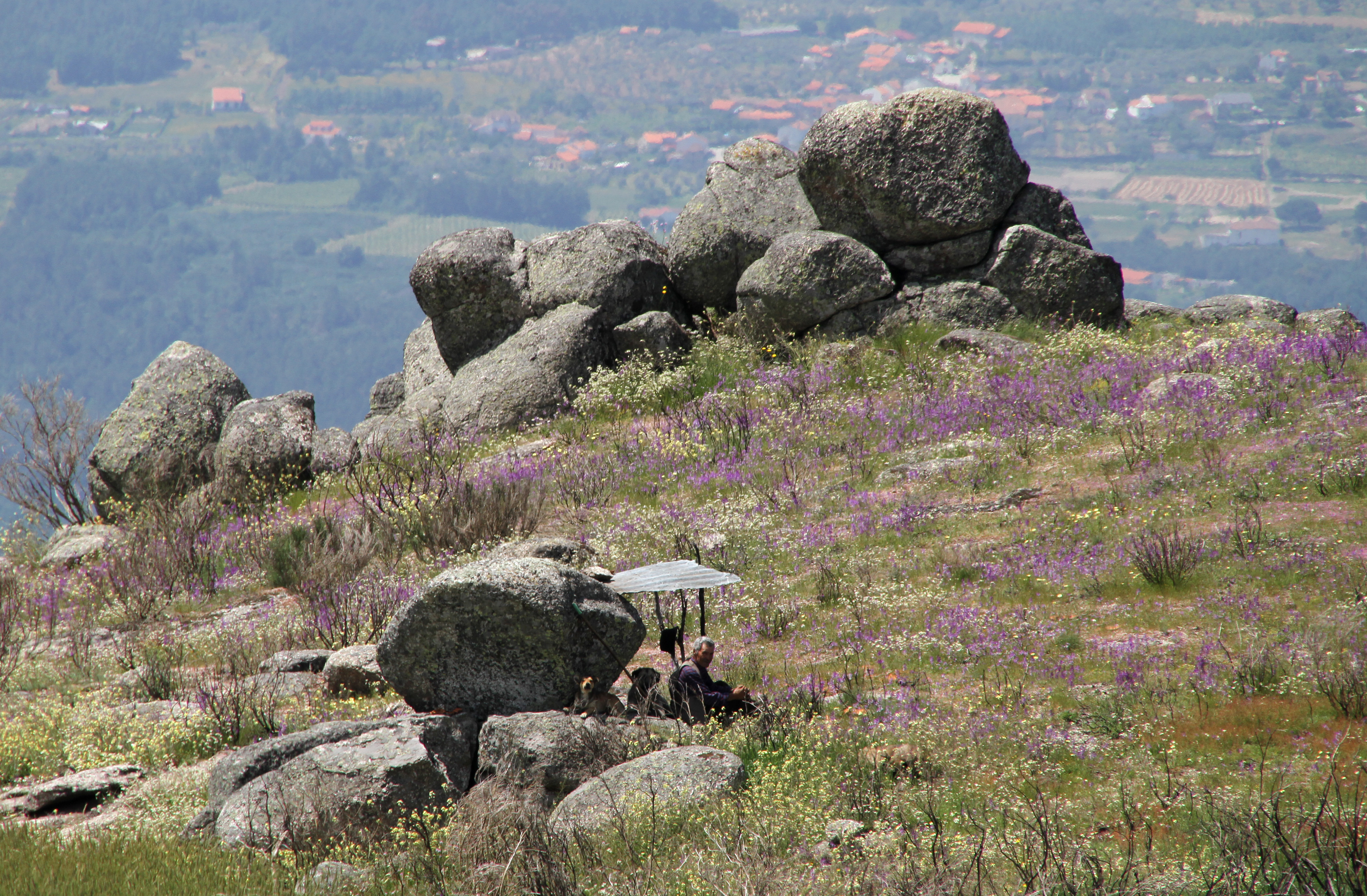

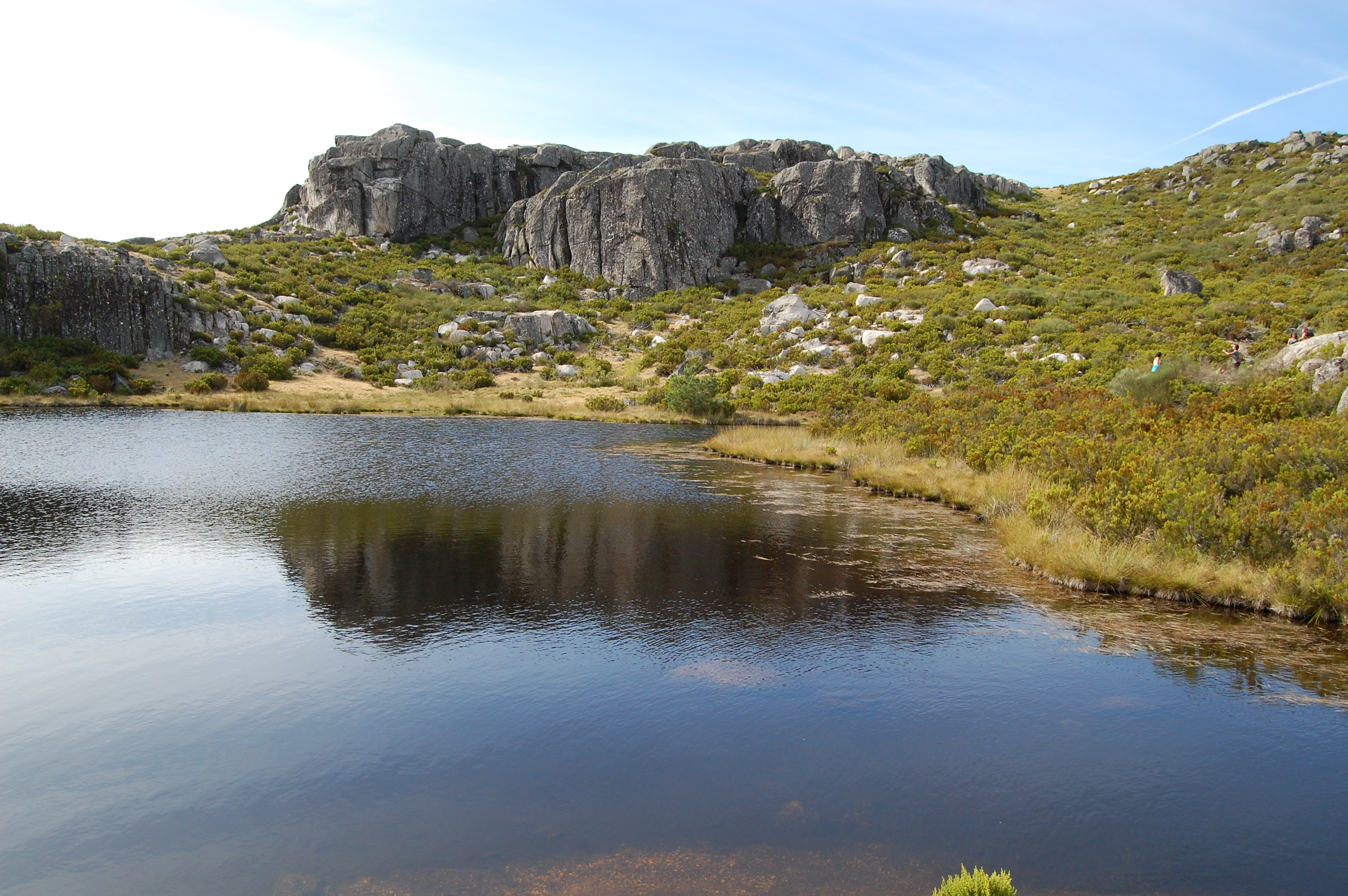

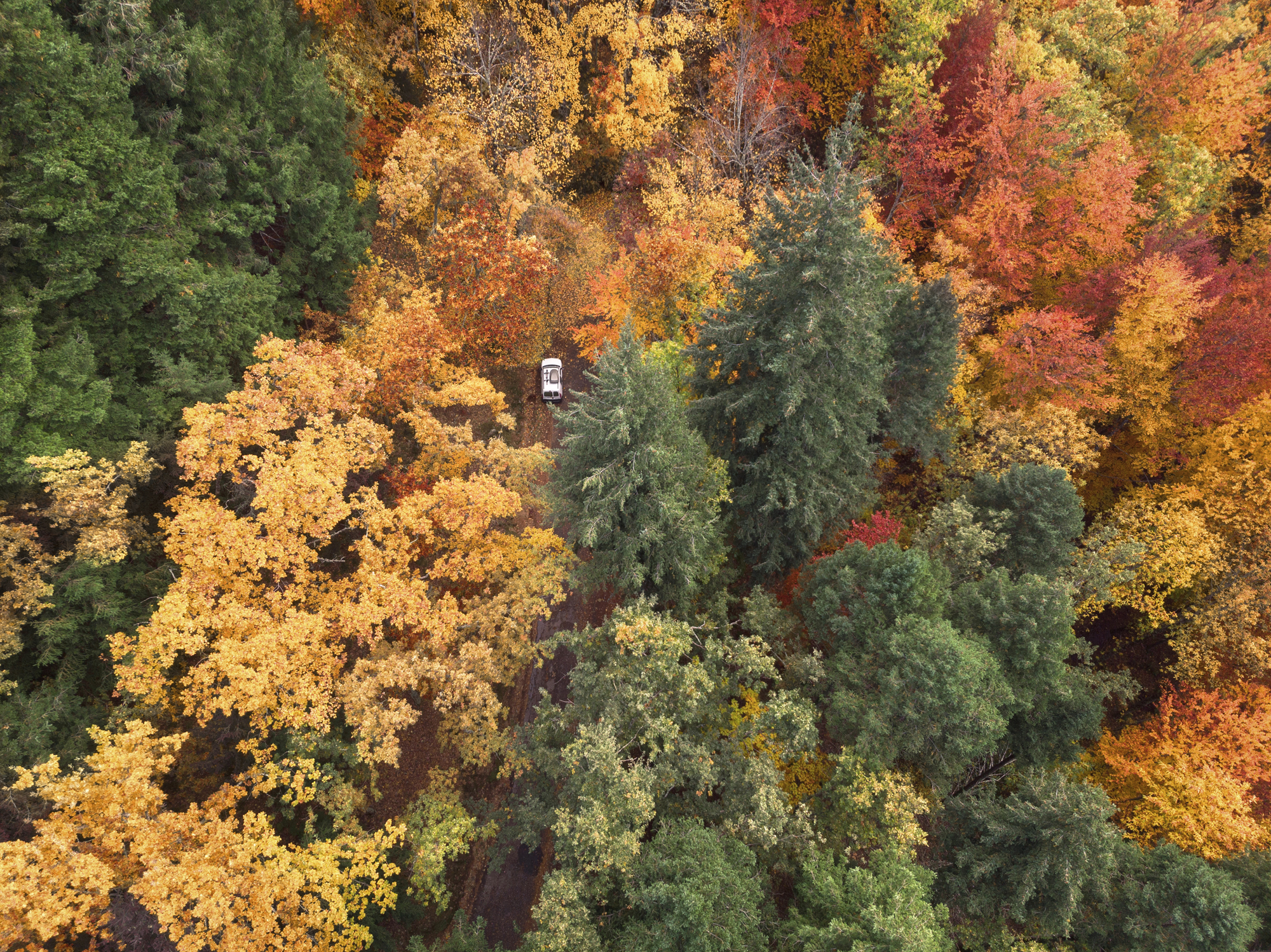

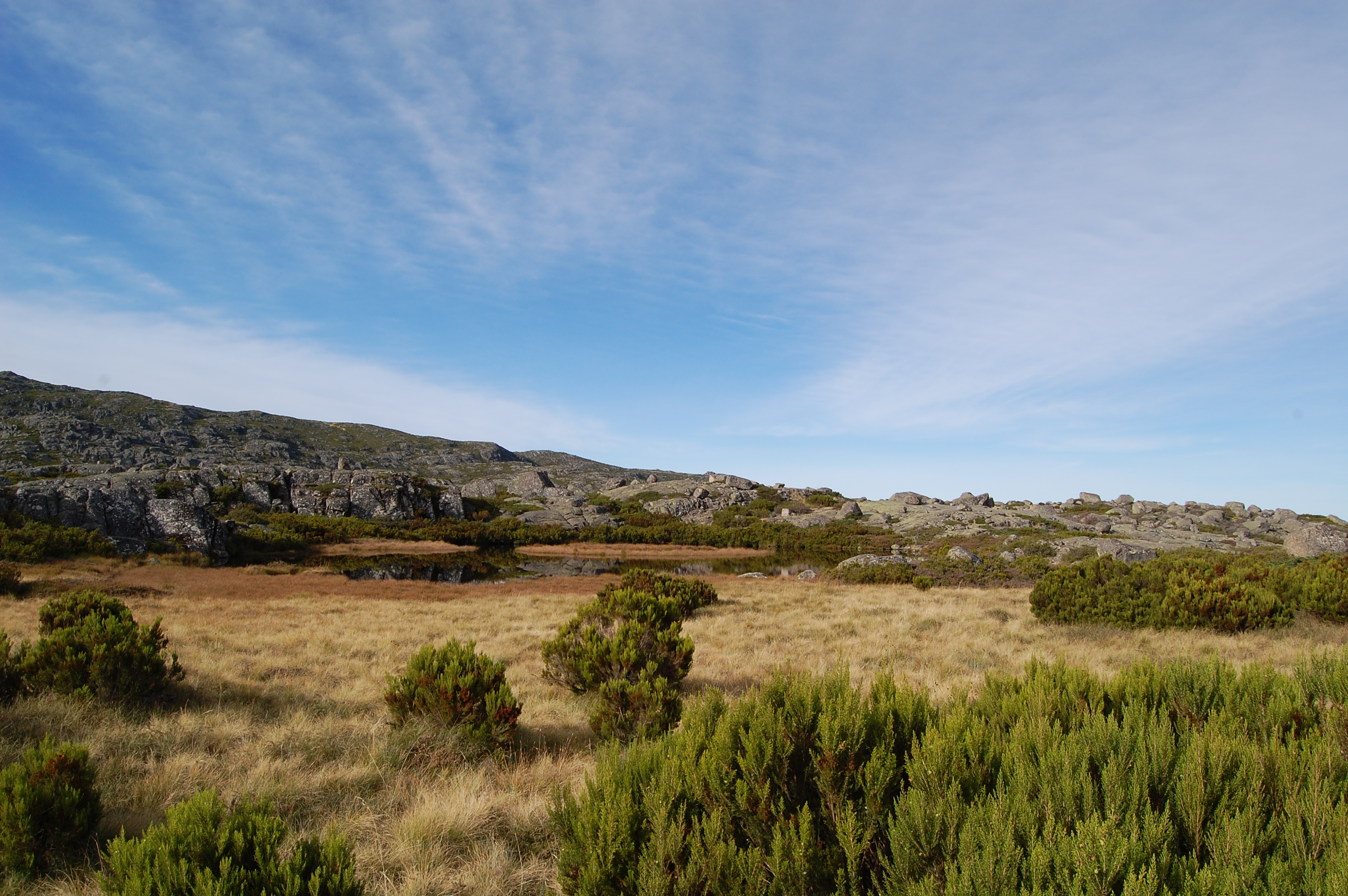

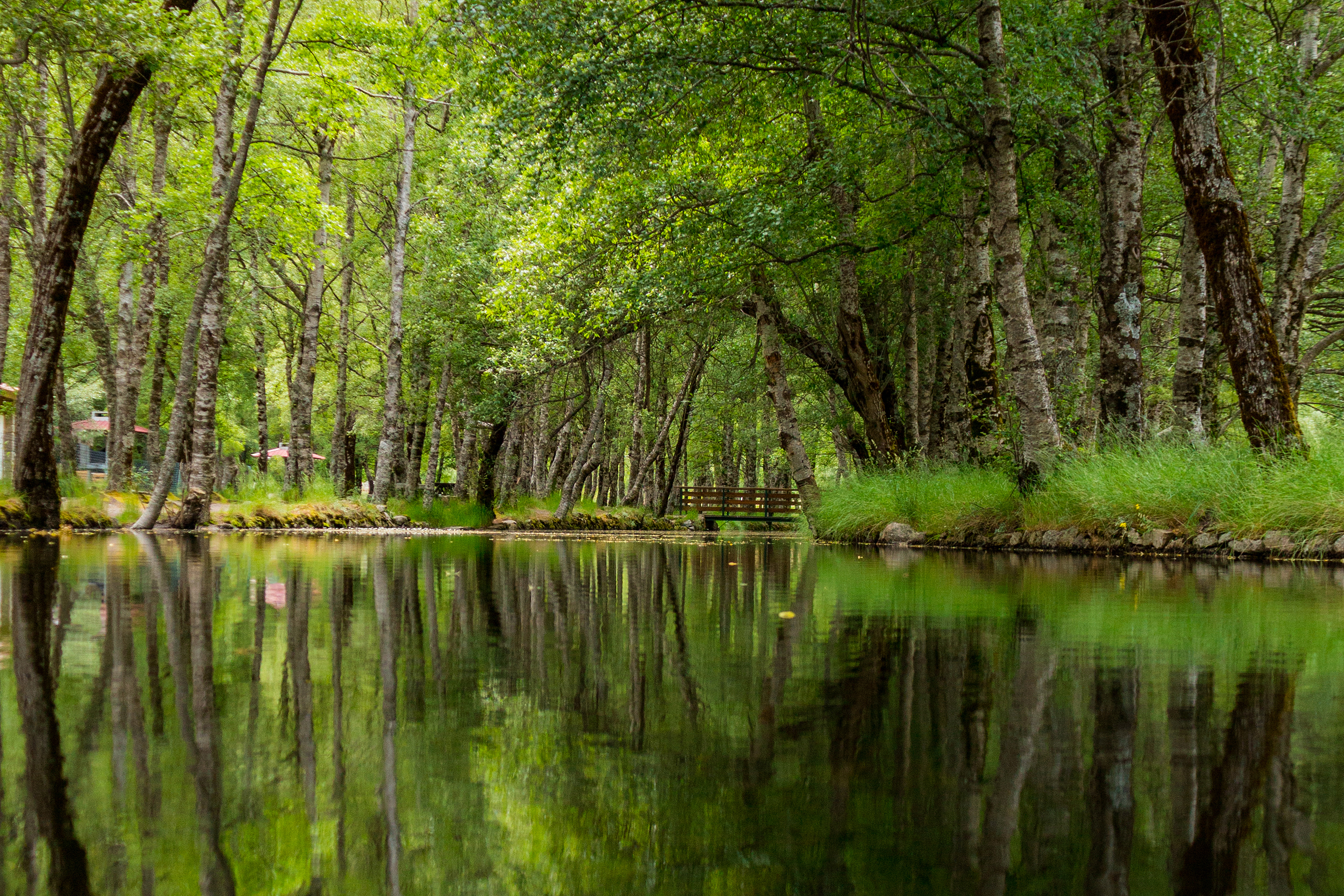

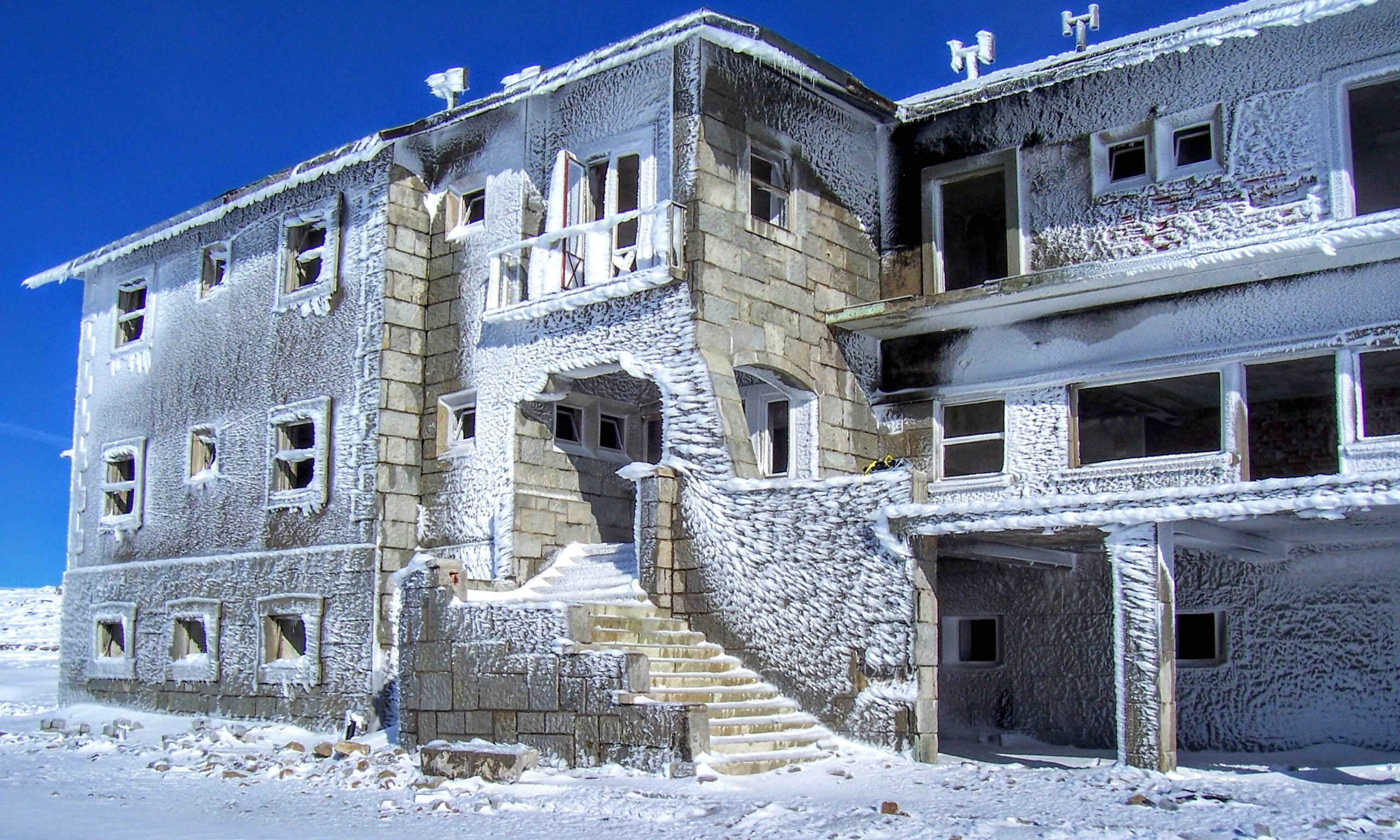

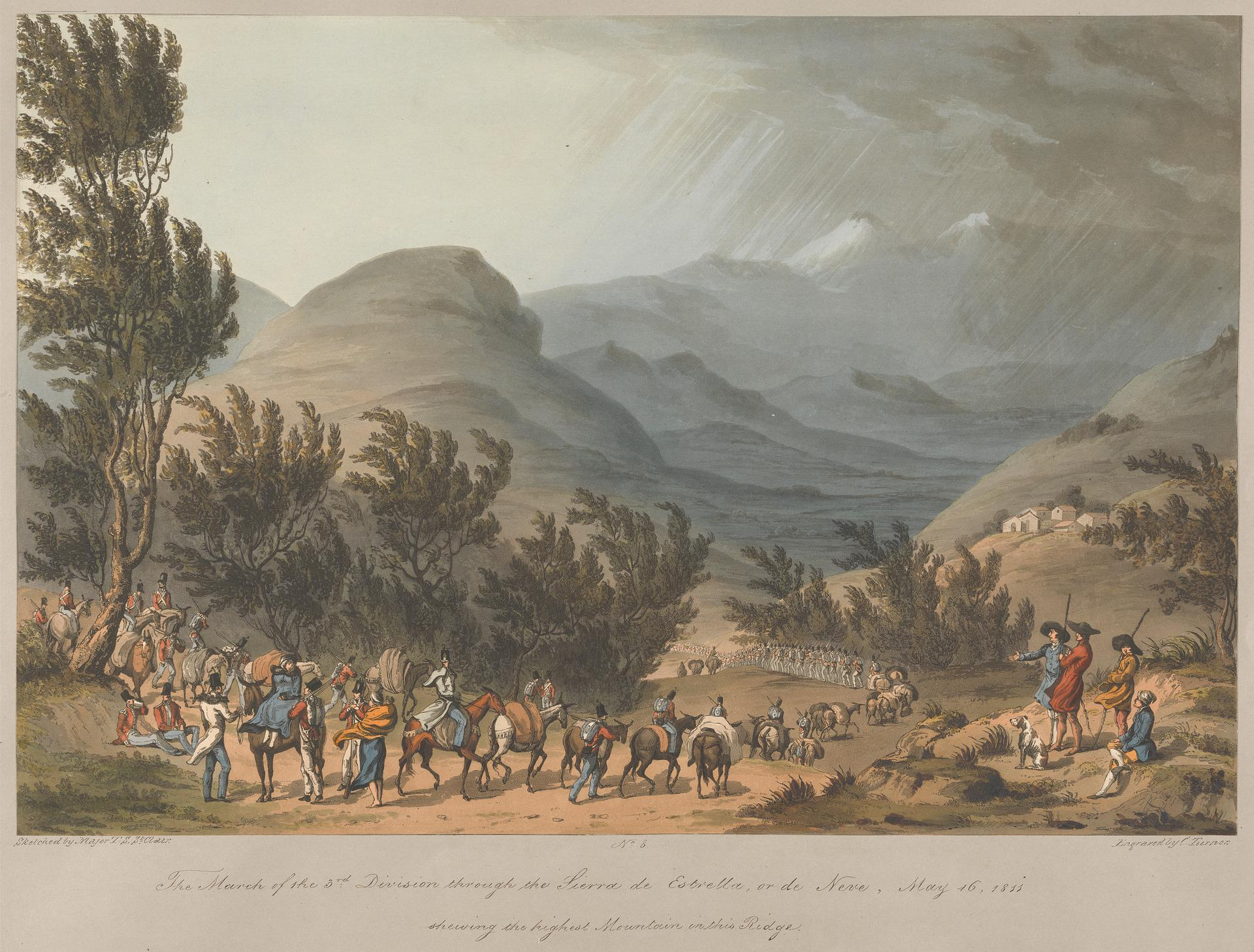
