= Serra da Estrela Ski Resort =

Ski resort in Portugal

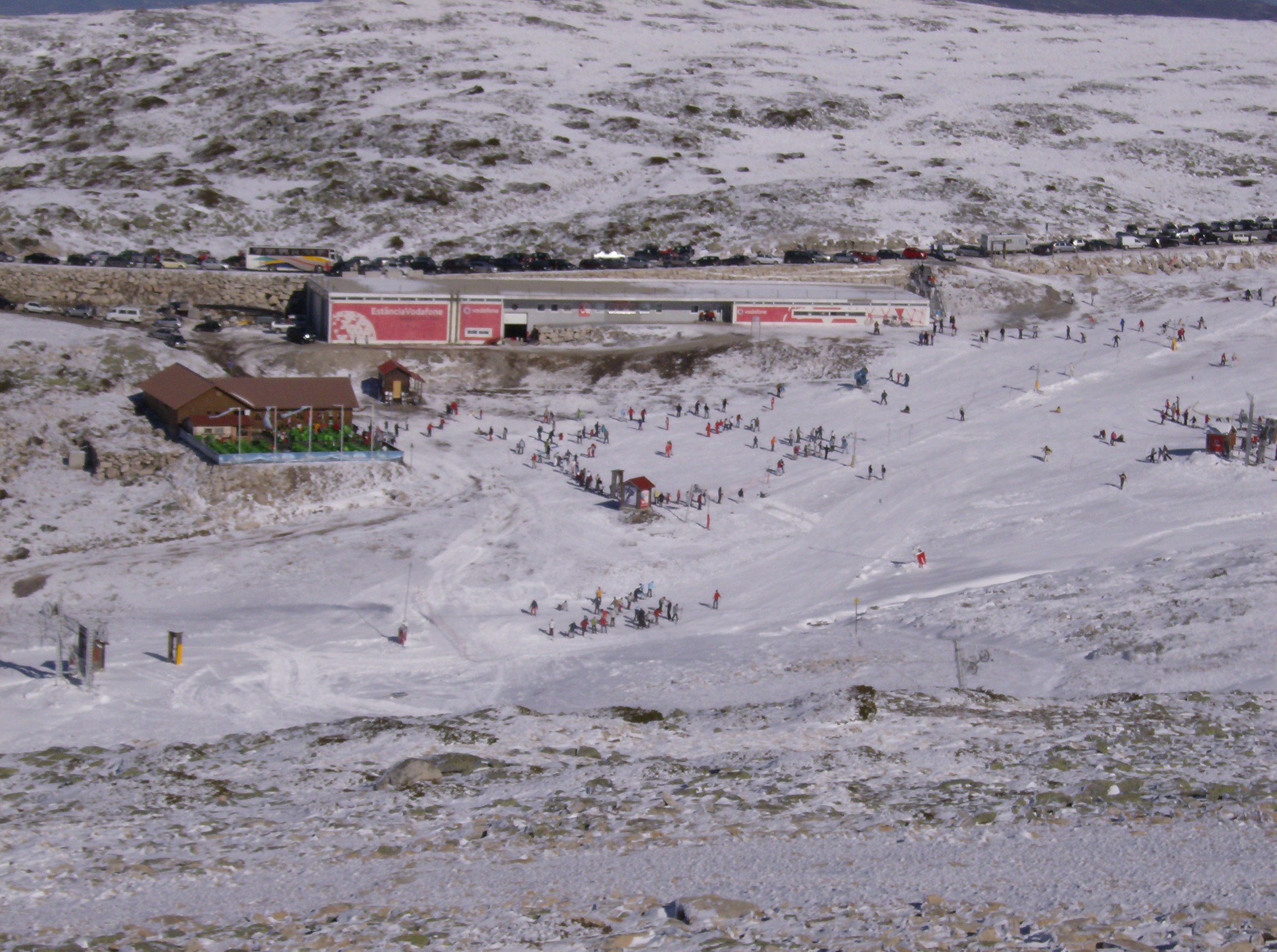
- Interactive map of Serra da Estrela Ski Resort
- Location: Serra da Estrela, Portugal
- Nearest city: Covilhã
- Coordinates: 40°19′25″N 7°36′47″W
- Vertical: 130 m (430 ft)
- Top elevation: 1,984 m (6,509 ft)
- Base elevation: 1,854 m (6,083 ft)
- Skiable area: 7.7 km (5 mi)
- Trails: 9
- Lift system: 4 platter lifts, 1 chairlift
- Terrain parks: 1
- Snowmaking: yes
- Website: https://www.skiserradaestrela.com/

Serra da Estrela Ski Resort (Portuguese: Estância de Esqui da Serra da Estrela) is a ski resort located in a mountain range named Serra da Estrela, in the municipality of Seia, parish (freguesia) of Loriga, Portugal.

== Description ==
This small ski resort is located in Serra da Estrela, close to Torre, the highest point in mainland Portugal, located in the municipality of Seia, within the Serra da Estrela Natural Park and the parish of Loriga, at an elevation of approximately 2,000 meters at the highest point. The nearest urban area to the resort is the city of Covilhã, about 20 km away, and the nearest accommodation is located in Penhas da Saúde, about 10 minutes away.

Covered by a blanket of snow from December to April, also aided by cannons that produce artificial snow, the ski resort has infrastructure for practicing winter sports and modern chair lifts. It is possible to rent equipment for skiing and snowboarding at this location.

This ski resort has 9 slopes, with a total length of 6.1 km, considered good for beginner skiers, but there are also slopes for more advanced skiers. Its minimum elevation is 1,854 meters in elevation, and the maximum is 1,984 m.

The resort is owned by tour operator Turistrela Hotels & Experiences. Currently, the group exclusively owns the tourist operation above the elevation of 800 meters, in Serra da Estrela.

Starting in 2005, the British telecommunications company Vodafone sponsored the ski resort for a number of years and was also responsible for improvements to it. During that sponsorship, the ski resort was officially called Vodafone Ski Resort (Estância de Esqui Vodafone).

== See also ==
- Torre, the highest point of Continental Portugal.
- Serra da Estrela Natural Park

== Sources ==
- (in English) Serra da Estrela Weather Forecast, Snow Report and Resort Information, Snow-forecast.com
