= Serra da Estrela =

Mountain range in north-central Portugal

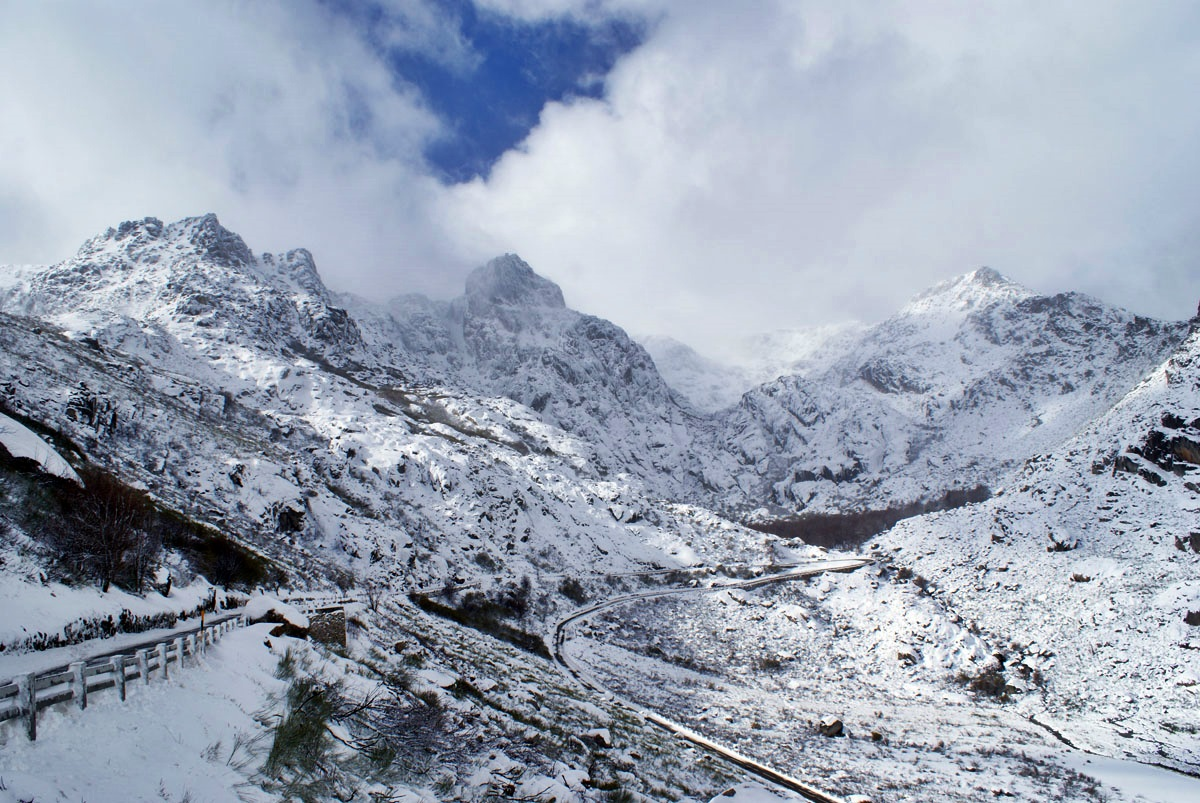
- A snow-covered Serra da Estrela in January

Highest point
- Peak: Torre
- Elevation: 1,993 m (6,539 ft)
- Prominence: 1,204 m (3,950 ft)
- Listing: Ribu
- Coordinates: 40°19′18.72″N 7°36′46.68″W

Geography
- Location within Portugal
- Country: Portugal
- Parent range: Sistema Central

Geology
- Rock type: Granite

Serra da Estrela (European Portuguese pronunciation: [ˈsɛʁɐ ðɐ (i)ʃˈtɾelɐ], lit. 'Star Mountain Range') is the highest mountain range in Continental Portugal. Together with the Serra da Lousã it is the westernmost constituent range of the Sistema Central and also one of the highest in the system. It includes mainland Portugal's highest point at 1,993 metres (6,539 feet) above mean sea level (although the summit of Mount Pico in the Portuguese Azores islands is higher). This point is not a distinctive mountain summit, but rather the highest point in a plateau, being known as Torre ("Tower" in English). Torre is an unusual summit in that it is accessible by a paved road. The peak has a topographic prominence of 1,204 m (3,950 ft) and its parent peak is Pico Almanzor, in Spain.

The mountain range, situated between the municipalities of Seia, Manteigas, Gouveia, Guarda and Covilhã, is about 100 kilometres (60 miles) long and is 30 km (19 mi) across at its widest point. It is formed from a huge granite ridge that once formed the southern frontier of the country.

== Rivers ==
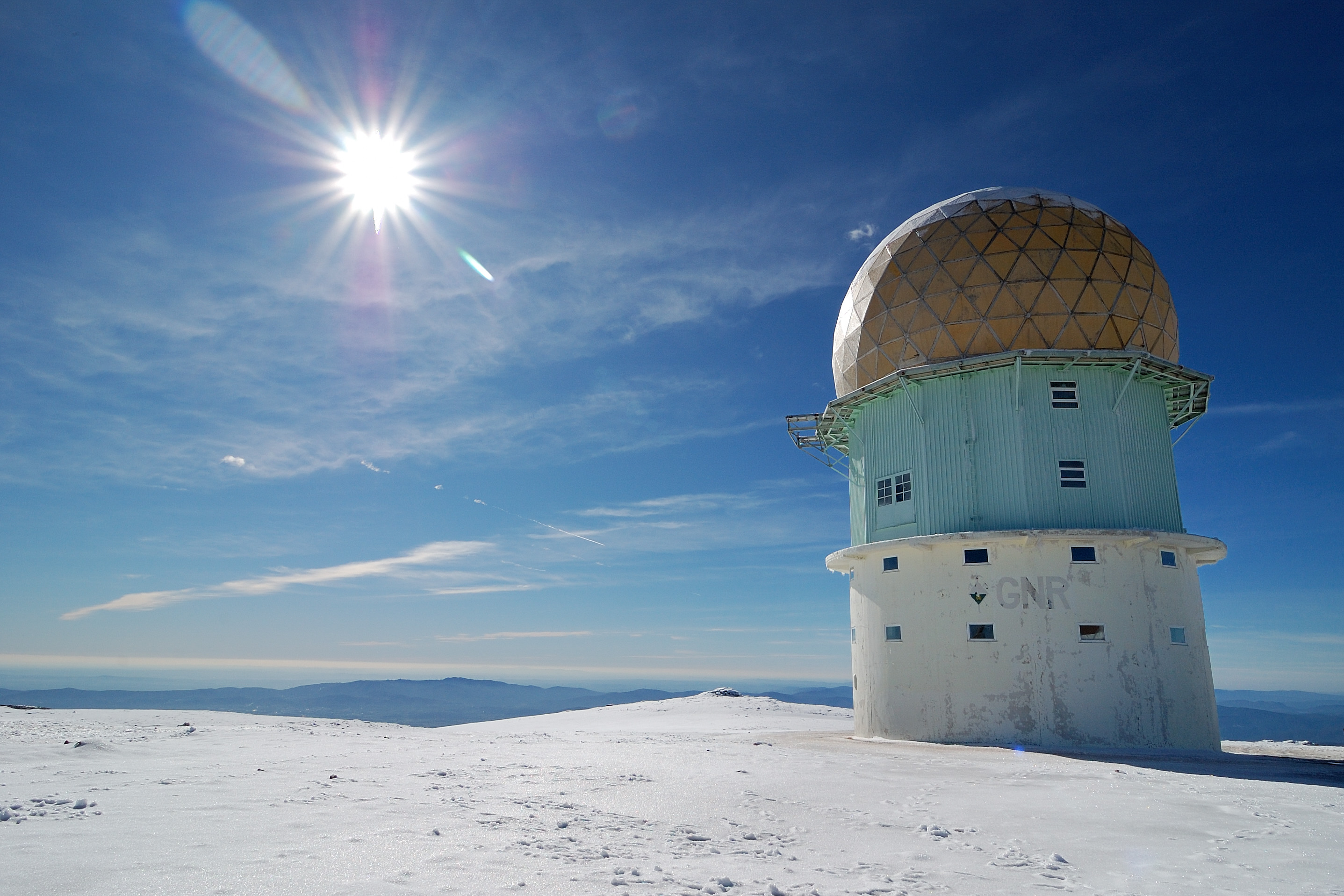
Dome of an old radar station in the highest point of Estrela Mountain on a winter's day.

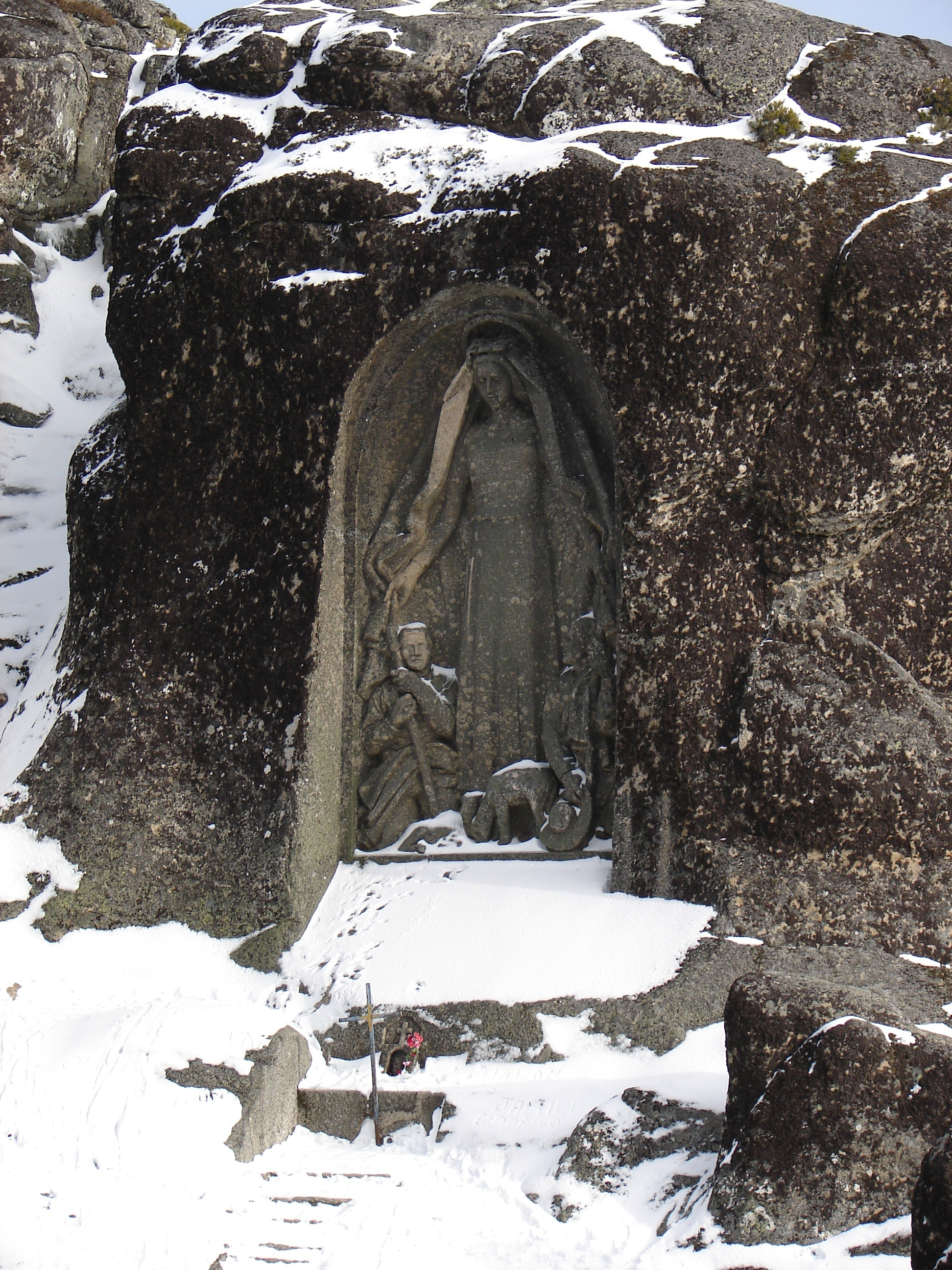
Image of Our Lady of the Good Star.

There are three rivers that have their headwaters in the Serra da Estrela: the Mondego, which is the longest river entirely within Portuguese territory; and the Zêzere, which is a tributary of the Tagus; a tributary of the Mondego, the Alva also has its headwaters in the range. It is 1,691 m (5,548 ft) high.

== Nature park ==
The mountain range is now part of the Serra da Estrela Natural Park and offers skiing opportunities in the ski resort of Loriga, Seia Municipality.

== Serra da Estrela dog ==
The Cão da Serra da Estrela (Estrela Mountain Dog) is a breed of livestock guardian dog that takes its name from this region.

== Serra da Estrela sheep and cheese ==
Queijo Serra da Estrela (Serra da Estrela cheese) is a soft cheese from the region of Serra da Estrela. The recipe is more than 2000 years old. It is made from cardoon thistle, raw sheep's milk and salt. The cheese is soft and gooey. The cheese becomes harder and chewier as time goes by. The region's ancient bordaleira sheep are also prized for their wool.

== Cuisine ==
The region's cuisine is well-regarded and includes dishes such as breaded sweet sardines and Juniper beef stew. Smoked meat (fumeiro) and traditional sausages (enchidos) are in abundance, the nettle sausage (alheira de urtiga) among them. Though the region has a very small local Jewish population, it has emerged as a center for Kosher food, with local producers launching kosher versions of their olive oil, wine and cheesemakers obtaining kosher certification for some products.

== Conchos dam ==
40°21′50.1″N 7°36′39.3″W

The Serra da Estrela is also home to a hydroelectric system of dams, part of which is the Covão dos Conchos. The Covão dos Conchos looks like a natural sinkhole within the lake at first glance, but it was constructed as a spillway in 1955 and acts as a water diversion from Ribeira das Naves to Lagoa Comprida.

== History, legends and myths ==
A legend associated with the mountain is mentioned in chapter 41 of the American literary classic, Moby-Dick:

"... the prodigies related in old times of the inland Strello mountain in Portugal (near whose top there was said to be a lake in which the wrecks of ships floated up to the surface)..."

Archaeological investigations have allowed a picture of life during the fifth millennium BC, the Early Neolithic to emerge, where small communities sustained themselves by small game hunting, the gathering of acorn and other winter fruits, and migratory pastoralism. The raising of sheep and goats, introduced to the region by the first Neolithic settlers - suggests that spring and summer were spent on high ground pastures and winter on the lower grounds of the river valleys. The significance of the Serra da Estrela in Neolithic culture can be seen in the discovery that megaliths in the Mondego River basin were predominantly built with an alignment that allowed the mountain range to be seen from within the inner chamber. At the same time the rise of Aldebaran, the brightest star of Taurus, behind the mountains could also be seen and its Heliacal rising in late April/early May could have been used as a temporal marker for the movement to the high pastures of Serra da Estrela. This archaeological narrative closely mirrors the local folklore that explains the name of the mountain range.

== See also ==
- Geography of Portugal
- Serra da Estrela Ski Resort
