= Torre (Serra da Estrela) =

Highest point of mainland Portugal

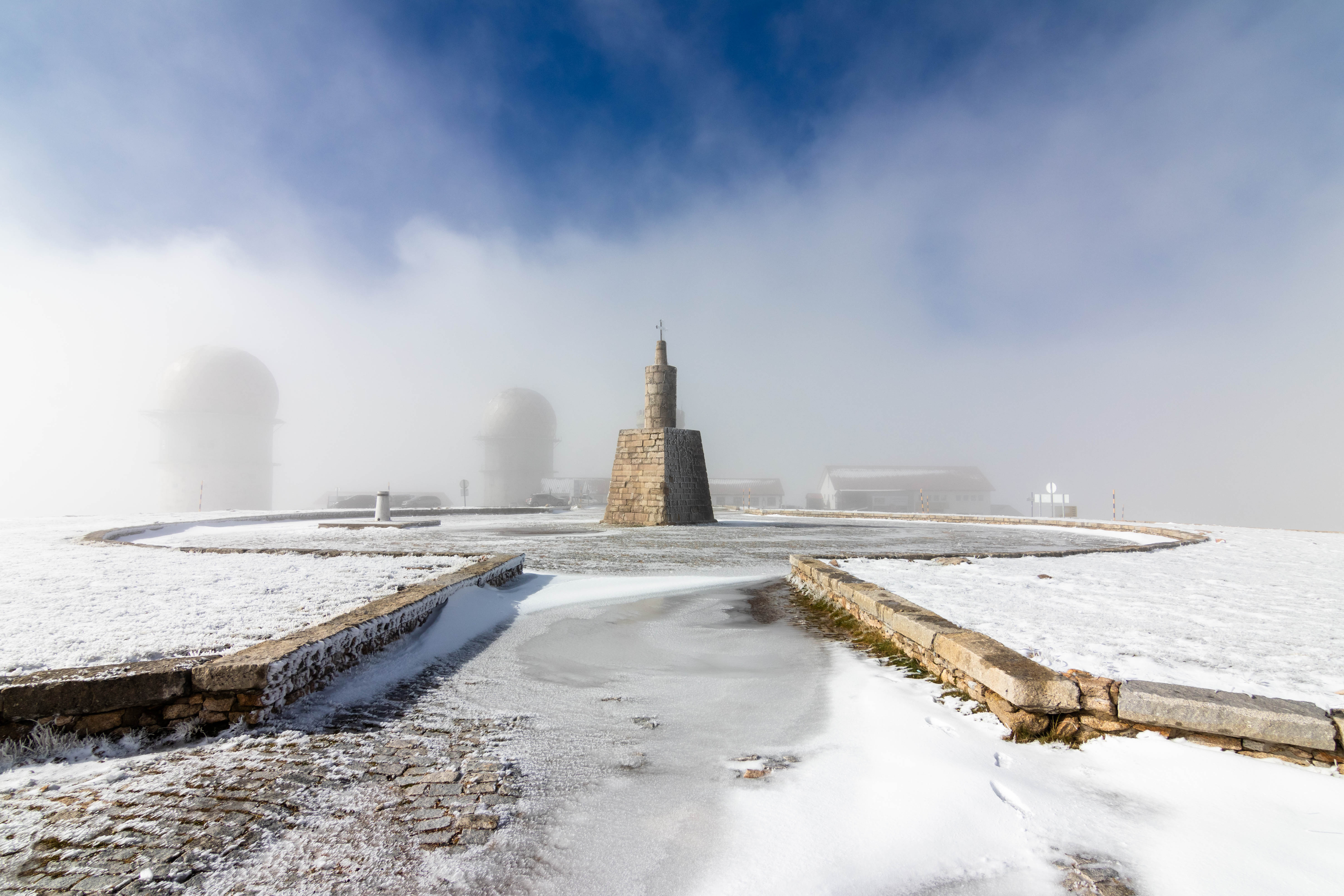
- Trig point that marks the highest point of Continental Portugal.

Highest point
- Elevation: 1,993 m (6,539 ft)
- Prominence: 1,204 m (3,950 ft)
- Parent peak: Torre Cerredo
- Listing: Extreme points of Portugal
- Coordinates: 40°19′18.8″N 07°36′46.6″W

Geography
- Location within Portugal
- Location: Seia, Guarda District, Portugal
- Parent range: Serra da Estrela (part of Sistema Central)

Climbing
- First ascent: Unknown
- Easiest route: Drive

Torre (English: Tower) is the highest point of mainland Portugal, and the second-highest of the country overall (after Mount Pico, in the Azores). This point is not a distinctive mountain summit, but rather the highest point in the Torre Plateau, in the central massif of the Estrela Mountains. Torre has an unusual feature of being a summit that is accessible by paved road, the Regional Road 339 (R 339), formerly National Road 339 (N 339). It is located on the border between the municipalities of Seia, District of Guarda and Covilhã, District of Castelo Branco.

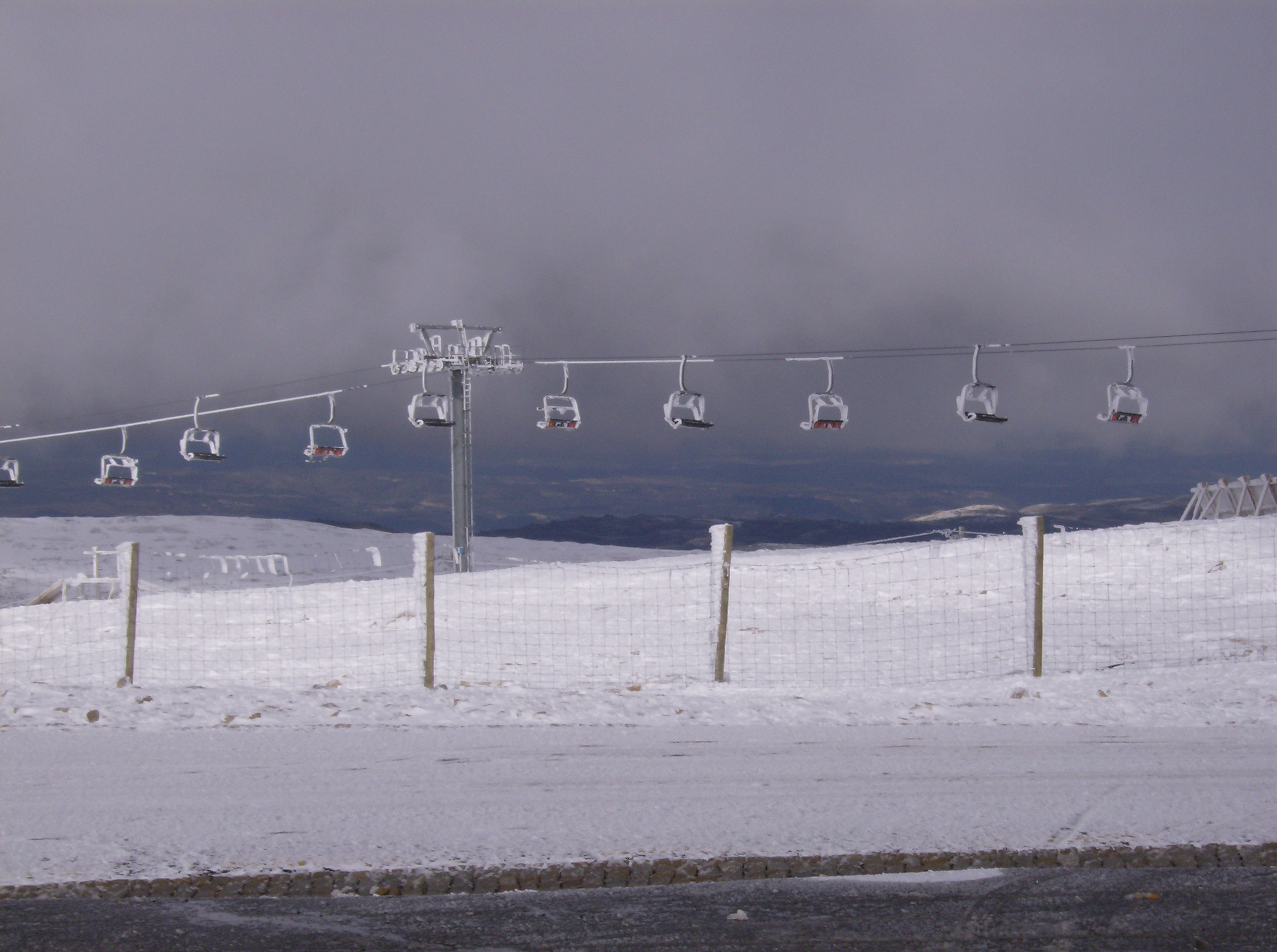
Ski lifts of the resort near Torre

The actual elevation of this area is 1,993 metres (6,537 feet), according to measures realized by the Instituto Geográfico do Exército (the military bureau for cartography). Right in the highest point of the mountain range, situated in the middle of a roundabout, near a road that connects the cities of Seia and Covilhã, a trig point that shows the highest point in Serra da Estrela was built.

Near Torre, there is a restaurant, stores with typical products of this region, like the Serra da Estrela cheese, and a ski center called Serra da Estrela Ski Resort. The nearest urban area is the city of Covilhã, 20 km (12 mi) away, and the nearest accommodations are situated in the village of Penhas da Saúde, 10 km (6 mi) away.

== Climate ==
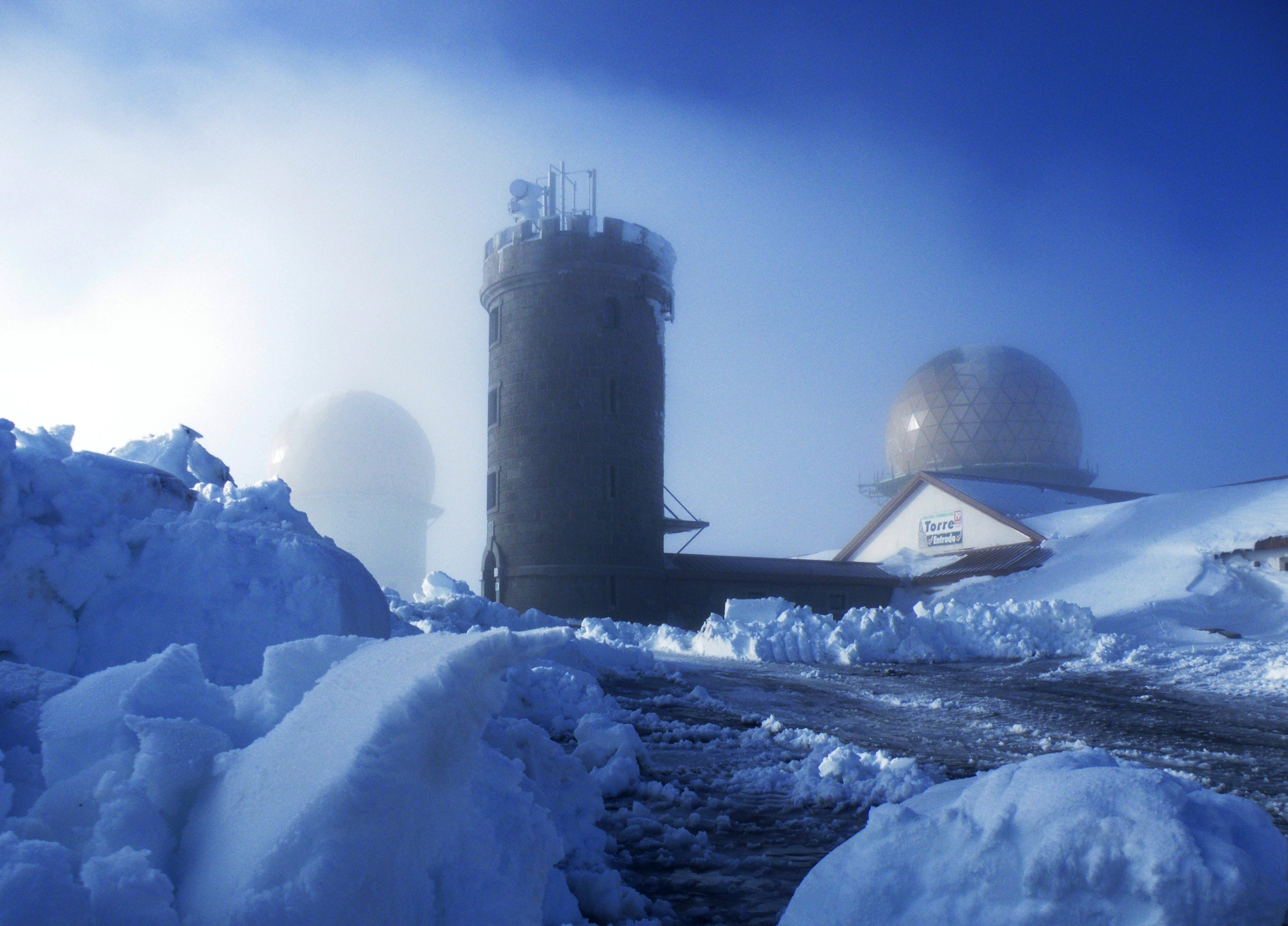
Air Force radar station built in 1957

Torre is the culminating point of the Serra da Estrela range and as such tends to present the lowest temperatures and highest precipitation levels. The climate is defined as a transition between areas of more typical Mediterranean climate seen south of the range, and more oceanic influenced climates to the north of the range. Precipitation is very high, with around 2,400 mm (94 in), but when compared to lower valley regions of the range, rain is rather weak and continuous. Snow can occur anywhere between October and April, mostly between December and February, but can be irregular.

Climate data for Torre, 1971-2000
Month	Jan	Feb	Mar	Apr	May	Jun	Jul	Aug	Sep	Oct	Nov	Dec	Year
Mean daily maximum °C (°F)	2.5 (36.5)	3.0 (37.4)	4.0 (39.2)	7.5 (45.5)	10.5 (50.9)	13.5 (56.3)	17.5 (63.5)	17.5 (63.5)	14.0 (57.2)	8.5 (47.3)	4.5 (40.1)	3.0 (37.4)	8.8 (47.9)
Daily mean °C (°F)	0.8 (33.4)	1.2 (34.2)	2.3 (36.1)	4.3 (39.7)	7.2 (45.0)	10.5 (50.9)	14.3 (57.7)	14.3 (57.7)	11.7 (53.1)	6.5 (43.7)	3.2 (37.8)	1.5 (34.7)	6.5 (43.7)
Mean daily minimum °C (°F)	−1.0 (30.2)	−0.5 (31.1)	0.5 (32.9)	1.0 (33.8)	4.0 (39.2)	7.5 (45.5)	11.0 (51.8)	11.0 (51.8)	9.5 (49.1)	4.5 (40.1)	2.0 (35.6)	0.0 (32.0)	4.1 (39.4)
Average rainfall mm (inches)	350 (13.8)	300 (11.8)	180 (7.1)	240 (9.4)	200 (7.9)	100 (3.9)	30 (1.2)	30 (1.2)	120 (4.7)	220 (8.7)	270 (10.6)	400 (15.7)	2,440 (96)
Source: IPMA

== Sources ==
- (in English) Serra da Estrela Forecast, Snow Report and Resort Information
- (in English and Portuguese) Região de Turismo da Serra da Estrela
- (in English and Portuguese) Câmara Municipal da Covilhã (Covilhã City Hall)
