= Algodres =

Algodres may refer to:

- Algodres, a civil parish in the municipality of Figueira de Castelo Rodrigo, Guarda, Portugal
- Algodres, a civil parish in the municipality of Fornos de Algodres, Guarda, Portugal

== See also ==
- Algodre
- Fornos de Algodres
