= Fornos de Algodres Municipal Chamber =

Legislative body of Fornos de Algodres

Coordinates: 40°37′13″N 7°32′21″W

Fornos de Algodres Municipal Chamber Câmara Municipal de Fornos de Algodres
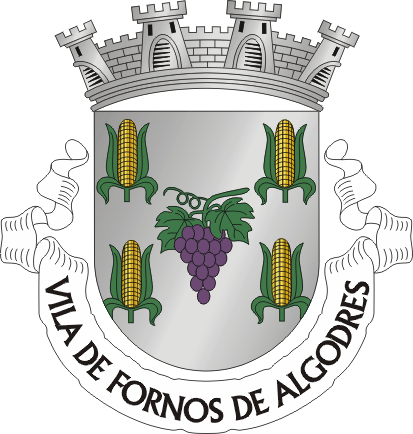
- Coat of arms of the town of Fornos de Algodres

Type
- Type: Câmara municipal
- Term limits: 3

History
- Founded: 1836; 189 years ago

Leadership
- President: António Manuel Pina Fonseca, PS since 20 October 2021
- Vice President: Alexandre Filipe Fernandes Lote, PS since 20 October 2021

Structure
- Seats: 5
- Political groups: Municipal Executive (3) PS (3) Opposition (2) PSD (2)
- Length of term: Four years

Elections
- Last election: 26 September 2021
- Next election: Sometime between 22 September and 14 October 2025

Meeting place
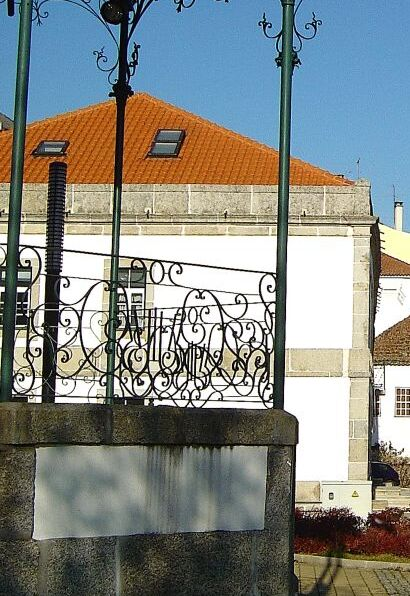
- Paços do Concelho de Fornos de Algodres

Website
- www.cm-fornosdealgodres.pt

The Fornos de Algodres Municipal Chamber (Portuguese: Câmara Municipal de Fornos de Algodres) is the administrative authority in the municipality of Fornos de Algodres. It has 12 freguesias in its jurisdiction and is based in the town of Fornos de Algodres, in the Guarda District. These freguesias are: Algodres; Casal Vasco; Cortiçô e Vila Chã; Figueiró da Granja; Fornos de Algodres; Infias; Juncais, Vila Ruiva e Vila Soeiro do Chão; Maceira; Matança; Muxagata; Queiriz and Sobral Pichorro e Fuinhas.

The Fornos de Algodres City Council consists of 5 councillors, currently representing two political forces. The first candidate on the list with the most votes in a municipal election or, in the event of a vacancy, the next candidate on the list, takes office as President of the Municipal Chamber.

== List of the Presidents of the Municipal Chamber of Fornos de Algodres ==
- António Rodrigues – (19??–19??) president by 1949

…

- António Pinheiro Marques Tavares – (19??–197?) president by 1962 and 1971

…

- Francisco Almeida Menano – (1974–1986)
- José da Costa Felício – (1986–1997)
- José Severino Miranda – (1997–2013)
- António Manuel Fonseca – (2013–2025)

(The list is incomplete)
