= Figueira de Castelo Rodrigo Municipal Chamber =

Legislative body of Figueira de Castelo Rodrigo

Coordinates: 40.89651°N 6.96309°W

Figueira de Castelo Rodrigo Municipal Chamber Câmara Municipal de Figueira de Castelo Rodrigo
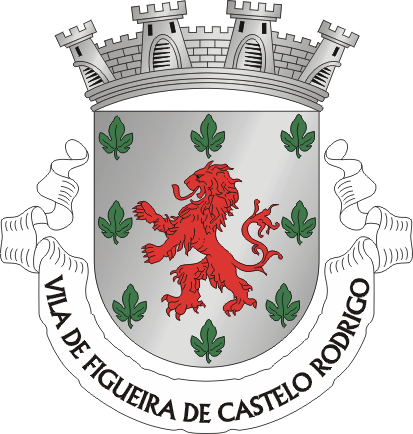
- Coat of arms of the town of Figueira de Castelo Rodrigo

Type
- Type: Câmara municipal
- Term limits: 3

History
- Founded: 1209; 816 years ago

Leadership
- President: Carlos Manuel Martins Condesso, PSD since 20 October 2021
- Vice President: Alfeu Miguel Ferreira Nascimento, PSD since 20 October 2021

Structure
- Seats: 5
- Political groups: Municipal Executive (3) PSD (3) Opposition (2) PS (2)
- Length of term: Four years

Elections
- Last election: 26 September 2021
- Next election: Sometime between 22 September and 14 October 2025

Meeting place
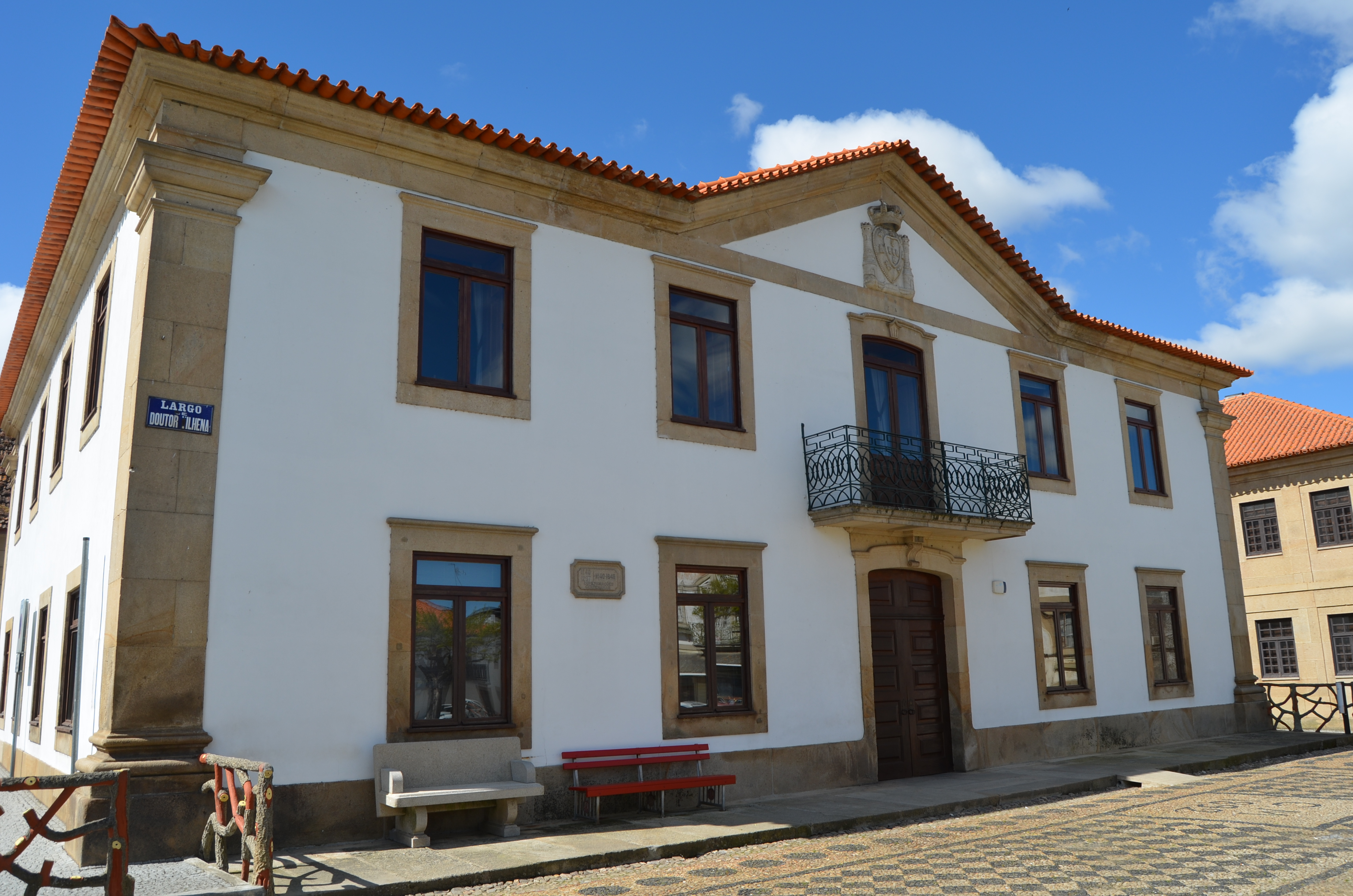
- Paços do Concelho de Figueira de Castelo Rodrigo

Website
- www.cm-fcr.pt

The Figueira de Castelo Rodrigo Municipal Chamber (Portuguese: Câmara Municipal de Figueira de Castelo Rodrigo) is the administrative authority in the municipality of Figueira de Castelo Rodrigo. It has 10 freguesias in its area of jurisdiction and is based in the town of Figueira de Castelo Rodrigo, on the Guarda District. These freguesias are: Algodres, Vale de Afonsinho e Vilar de Amargo; Almofala e Escarigo; Castelo Rodrigo; Cinco Vilas e Reigada; Colmeal e Vilar Torpim; Escalhão; Figueira de Castelo Rodrigo; Freixeda do Torrão, Quintã de Pêro Martins e Penha de Águia; Mata de Lobos and Vermiosa.

The Figueira de Castelo Rodrigo City Council is made up of 5 councillors, representing, currently, two different political forces. The first candidate on the list with the most votes in a municipal election or, in the event of a vacancy, the next candidate on the list, takes office as President of the Municipal Chamber.

== List of the Presidents of the Municipal Chamber of Figueira de Castelo Rodrigo ==
- José Pinto Lopes – (1976–1979)
- Adolfo Cabral Matos – (1979–1982)
- Fernando Carrilho Martins – (1982–1989)
- Fernando Madeira Bordalo – (1989–1997)
- Armando Pinto Lopes – (1997–2005)
- António Edmundo Ribeiro – (2005–2013)
- Paulo Langrouva – (2013–2021)
- Carlos Manuel Martins Condesso – (2021–2025)
