= Casal Vasco =

- Civil parish
- Location in Portugal
- Coordinates: 40.65°N 7.55°W
- Country: Portugal
- Region: Centro
- Intermunic. comm.: Beiras e Serra da Estrela
- District: Guarda
- Municipality: Fornos de Algodres

Area
  - Total: 6.73 km^{2} (2.60 sq mi)

Population (2011)
  - Total: 227
  - Density: 33.7/km^{2} (87.4/sq mi)
- Time zone: UTC+00:00 (WET)
  - Summer (DST): UTC+01:00 (WEST)
- Website: www.casalvasco.com

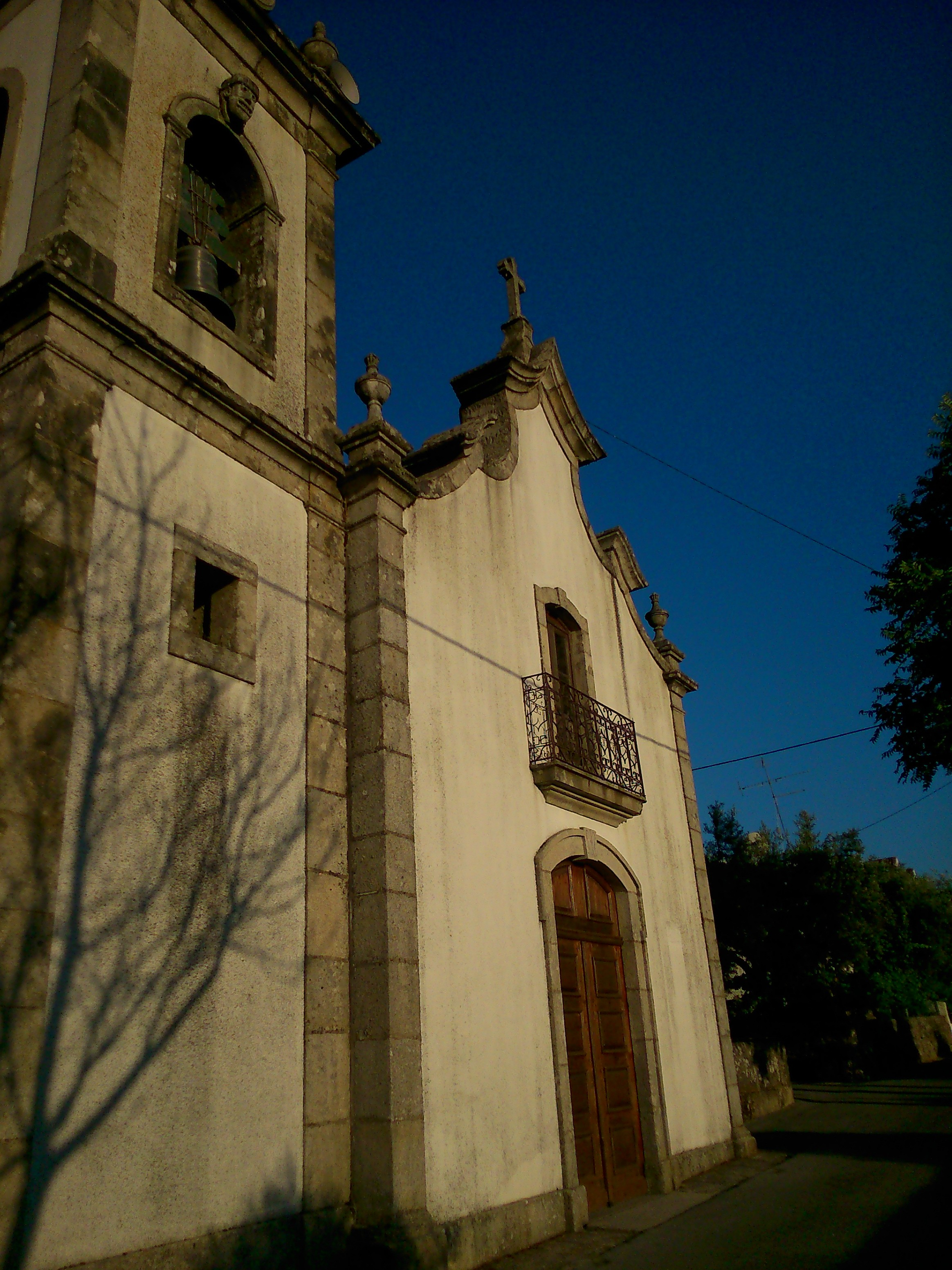
Church of Casal Vasco

Casal Vasco is a small village in Portugal. It belongs to the municipality of Fornos de Algodres, district of Guarda. It's also located in the former region of Beira Alta. The population in 2011 was 227, in an area of 6.73 km^{2}. Includes the place of Ramirão and the Quinta das Moitas.

No one really knows when Casal Vasco was founded, but the first documentation of the village's existence is a list of Portuguese villages from 1527. Ever since, Casal Vasco is a place where most of the people dedicated their lives to agriculture.

Casal Vasco has a rich heritage which includes:

- 1 church: Saint Antony - from the 18th century
- 4 chapels: Senhor dos Loureiros (16th century), Senhora da Encarnação (15th century), Senhora da Graça (18th century) and São Sebastião (16th century)
- alminhas
- Roman grave stone: from the 1st century
- anthropomorphic graves: from between the 7th and 12th centuries
- manor houses: both from the 15th century

It also has a big tradition of legends, theater, traditional games, gastronomy and crafts (pieces made in wood and embroidery).

The town of Fornos de Algodres is just 5 kilometers away. It has restaurants, supermarkets, and bars. This is a place hidden in the left side of the biggest mountain of continental Portugal, Serra da Estrela (almost 2000 m). The Mondego River passes 5 kilometers away. The cities of Viseu and Guarda are 35 kilometers from Casal Vasco.
