= Sobral Pichorro =

- Civil parish
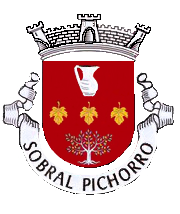
- Coat of arms

- Location in Portugal
- Coordinates: 40.68°N 7.47°W
- Country: Portugal
- Region: Centro
- District: Guarda
- Municipality: Fornos de Algodres
- Disbanded: 2013

Area
  - Total: 8.81 km^{2} (3.40 sq mi)

Population (2001)
  - Total: 227
  - Density: 26/km^{2} (67/sq mi)
- Time zone: UTC+00:00 (WET)
  - Summer (DST): UTC+01:00 (WEST)

Sobral Pichorro is a former civil parish in the municipality of Fornos de Algodres, district of Guarda, Portugal. In 2013, the parish merged into the new parish Sobral Pichorro e Fuinhas.

== Gallery ==
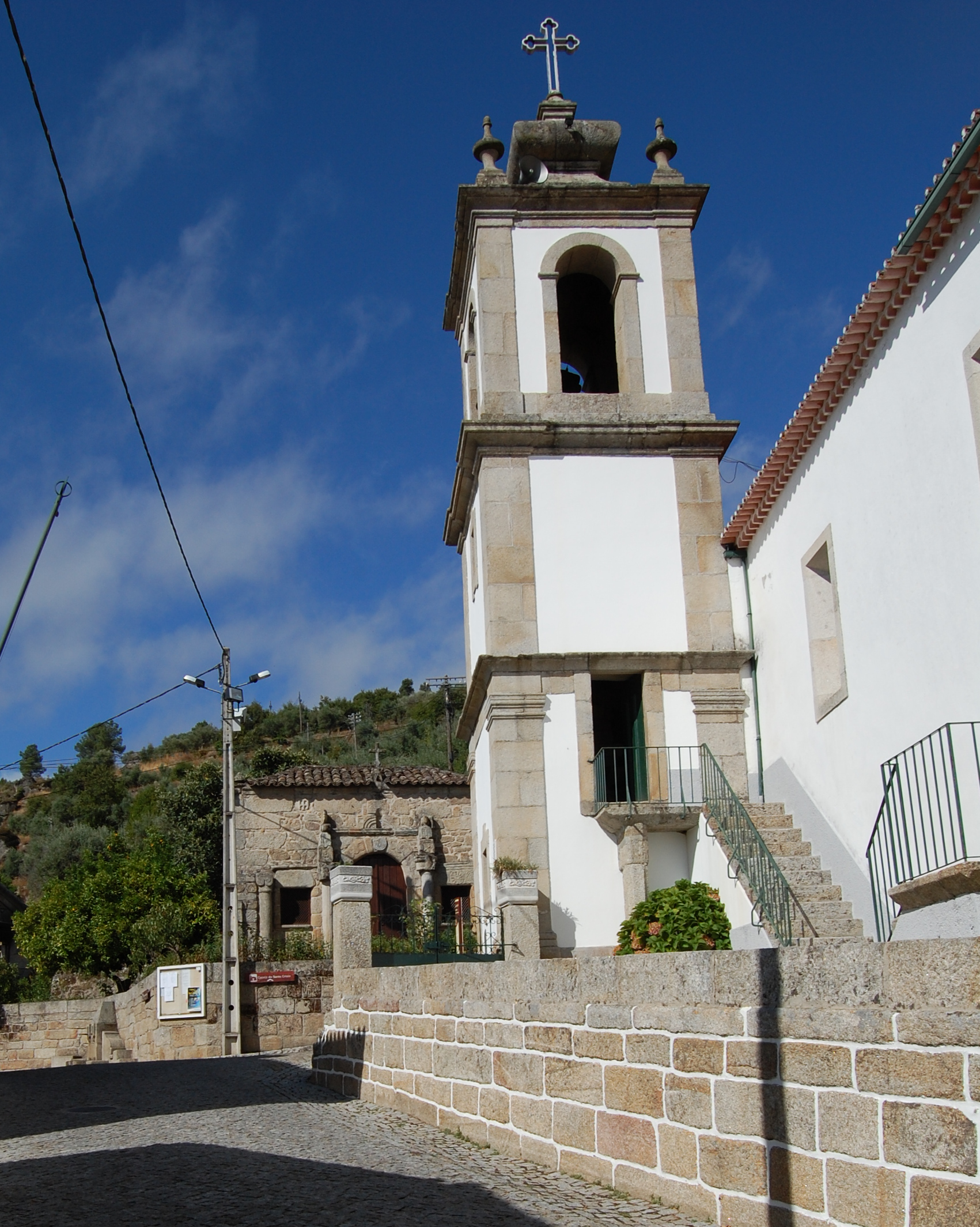
Santo Cristo & Nossa senhora da Graça

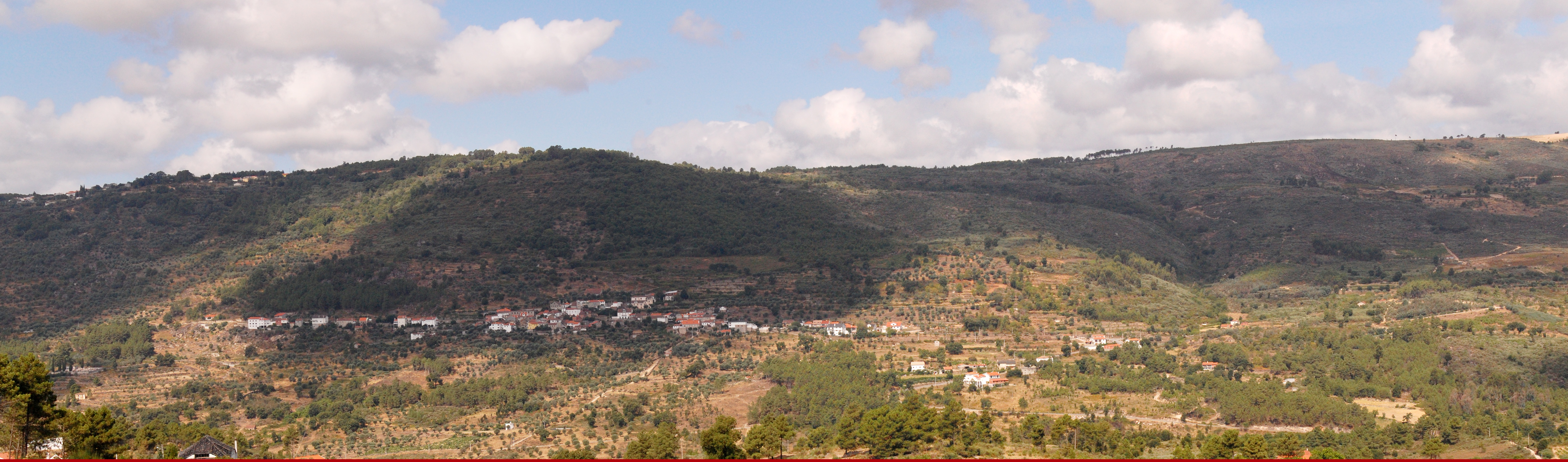
Panoramic view
