= Seia, São Romão e Lapa dos Dinheiros =

- Civil parish
- Location in Portugal
- Coordinates: 40.420°N 7.703°W
- Country: Portugal
- Region: Centro
- Intermunic. comm.: Beiras e Serra da Estrela
- District: Guarda
- Municipality: Seia

Area
  - Total: 53.80 km^{2} (20.77 sq mi)

Population (2021)
  - Total: 8,705
  - Density: 161.8/km^{2} (419.1/sq mi)
- Time zone: UTC+00:00 (WET)
  - Summer (DST): UTC+01:00 (WEST)

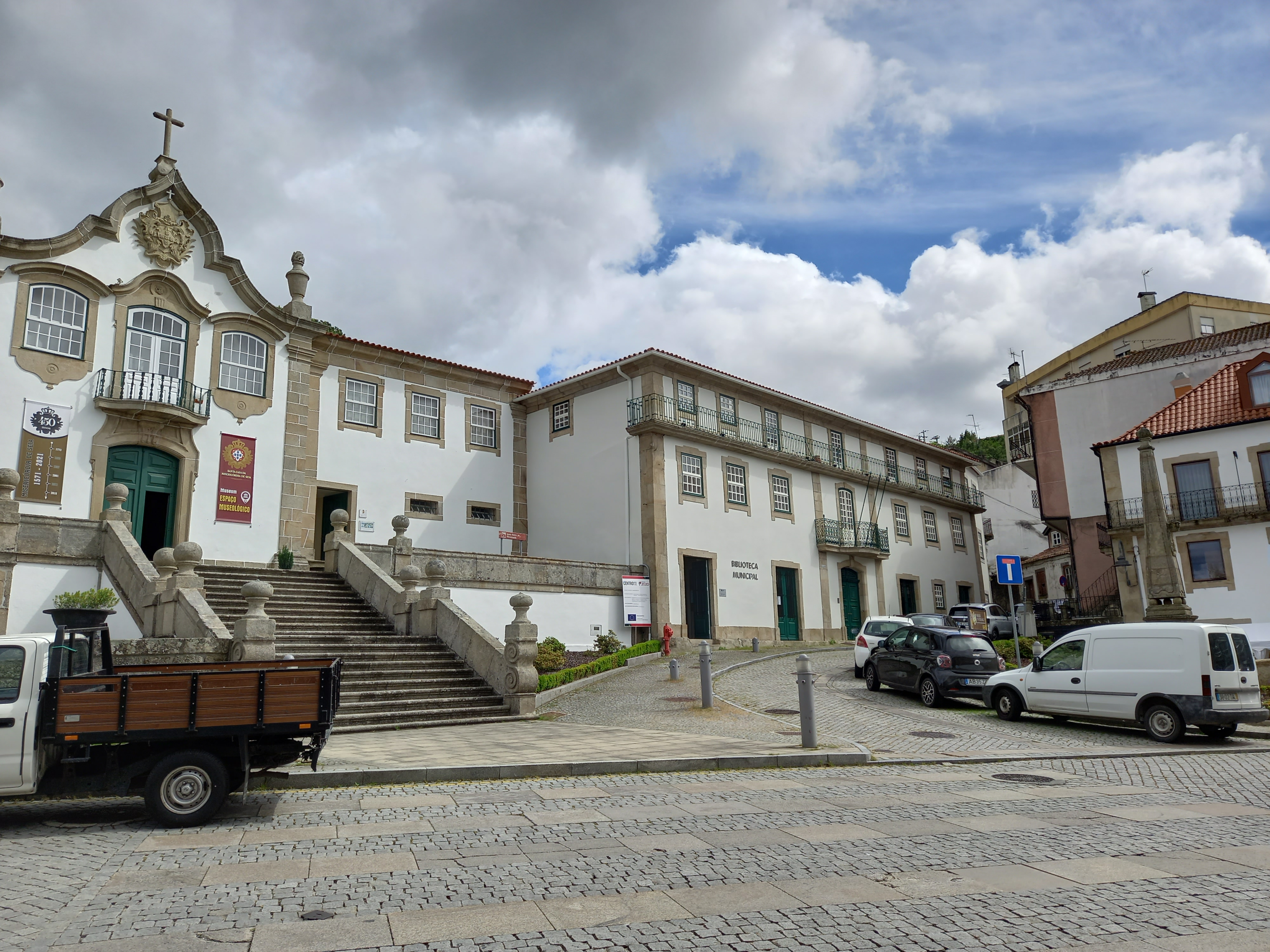
Municipal Library of Seia and Church of Mercy of Seia

Seia, São Romão e Lapa dos Dinheiros is a civil parish in the municipality of Seia, Portugal. It was formed in 2013 by the merger of the former parishes Seia, São Romão and Lapa dos Dinheiros. The population in 2021 was 8,705, in an area of 53.80 km^{2}.
