= Teixeira (Seia) =

- Civil parish
- Location in Portugal
- Coordinates: 40.254°N 7.742°W
- Country: Portugal
- Region: Centro
- Intermunic. comm.: Beiras e Serra da Estrela
- District: Guarda
- Municipality: Seia

Area
  - Total: 15.92 km^{2} (6.15 sq mi)

Population (2011)
  - Total: 187
  - Density: 12/km^{2} (30/sq mi)
- Time zone: UTC+00:00 (WET)
  - Summer (DST): UTC+01:00 (WEST)

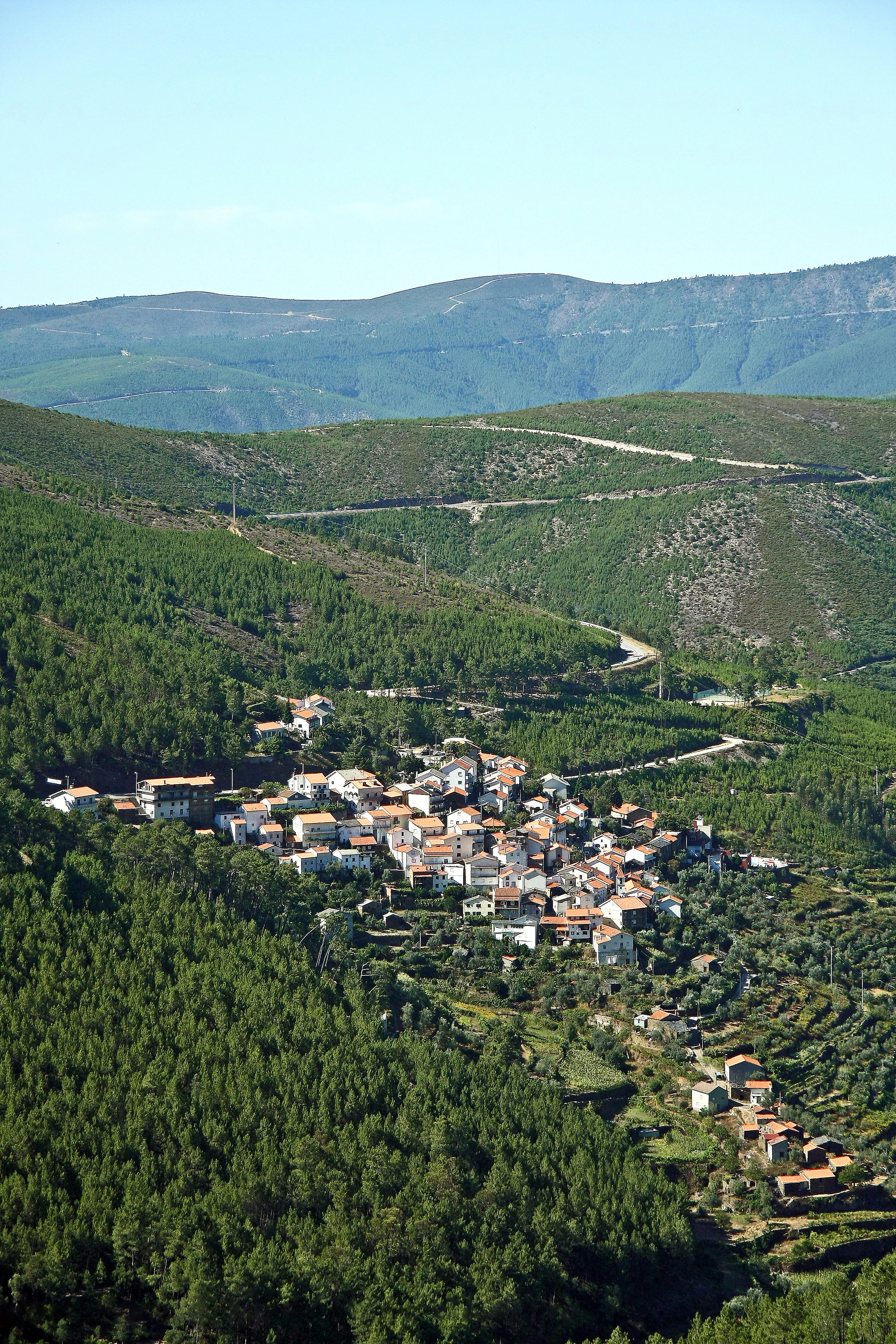

Teixeira is a Portuguese parish, located in the municipality of Seia. The population in 2011 was 187, in an area of 15.92 km^{2}.
