= Girabolhos =

- Civil parish
- Location in Portugal
- Coordinates: 40.509444°N 7.736667°W
- Country: Portugal
- Region: Centro
- Intermunic. comm.: Beiras e Serra da Estrela
- District: Guarda
- Municipality: Seia

Area
  - Total: 17.88 km^{2} (6.90 sq mi)

Population (2011)
  - Total: 317
  - Density: 17.7/km^{2} (45.9/sq mi)
- Time zone: UTC+00:00 (WET)
  - Summer (DST): UTC+01:00 (WEST)
- Postal code: 6270-051 / 6270-052
- Area code: 238
- Patron: Santa Justa

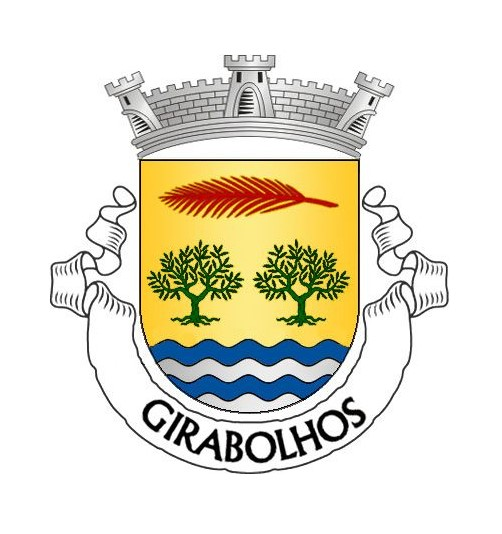
Coat of arms of Girabolhos

Girabolhos is a civil parish in the municipality of Seia, Portugal. The population in 2011 was 317, in an area of 17.88 km^{2} (6.90 sq mi).

== History ==
In 1882, Girabolhos became a part of the civil parish of Tourais and remained so until it was constituted as its own parish. It is home to several landmarks with local historical significance, namely, the Chapel of Nossa Senhora da Cabeça, the Mother Church, the Chapel of Saint Nicholas, Casa de Girabolhos and the building which serves as the seat of the junta, or parish government. For much of its history, Girabolhos belonged to the Roman Catholic Diocese of Coimbra, though it is today a part of the Diocese of Guarda, itself within the jurisdiction of the Patriarchate of Lisbon.

== Religion ==
The population of Girabolhos is predominately Roman Catholic. Among the primary annual religious feasts are those of Nossa Senhora da Cabeça (celebrated the Sunday after Ascension Thursday), Saint Anthony (celebrated the weekend nearest 13 June), and Saint Simon (celebrated the last Sunday in October).

== Population ==
Population of Girabolhos
1864	1878	1890	1900	1911	1920	1930	1940	1950	1960	1970	1981	1991	2001	2011
953	991	1,142	1,141	1,128	1,052	1,080	1,221	1,528	1,116	880	667	637	482	317

== Places ==
The civil parish of Girabolhos is made up of two main population centers: Girabolhos and Ortigueira.

== Mining ==
The Fontinha mine in Girabolhos was explored between 1989 and 1991. In 2015, it underwent environmental remediation.

== Climate ==
Climate data for Girabolhos
Month	Jan	Feb	Mar	Apr	May	Jun	Jul	Aug	Sep	Oct	Nov	Dec	Year
Mean daily maximum °C (°F)	5.8 (42.4)	5.9 (42.6)	7.8 (46.0)	9.4 (48.9)	13.2 (55.8)	17.9 (64.2)	22.0 (71.6)	22.1 (71.8)	19.1 (66.4)	13.3 (55.9)	8.7 (47.7)	6.5 (43.7)	12.7 (54.9)
Mean daily minimum °C (°F)	0.3 (32.5)	0.2 (32.4)	1.1 (34.0)	2.2 (36.0)	5.3 (41.5)	9.4 (48.9)	12.6 (54.7)	12.5 (54.5)	10.9 (51.6)	6.8 (44.2)	3.0 (37.4)	0.9 (33.6)	5.5 (41.9)
Average rainfall mm (inches)	241 (9.5)	226 (8.9)	147 (5.8)	142 (5.6)	114 (4.5)	79 (3.1)	25 (1.0)	15 (0.6)	61 (2.4)	183 (7.2)	239 (9.4)	241 (9.5)	1,713 (67.4)
Source: The Weather Channel
