= Sazes da Beira =

- Civil parish
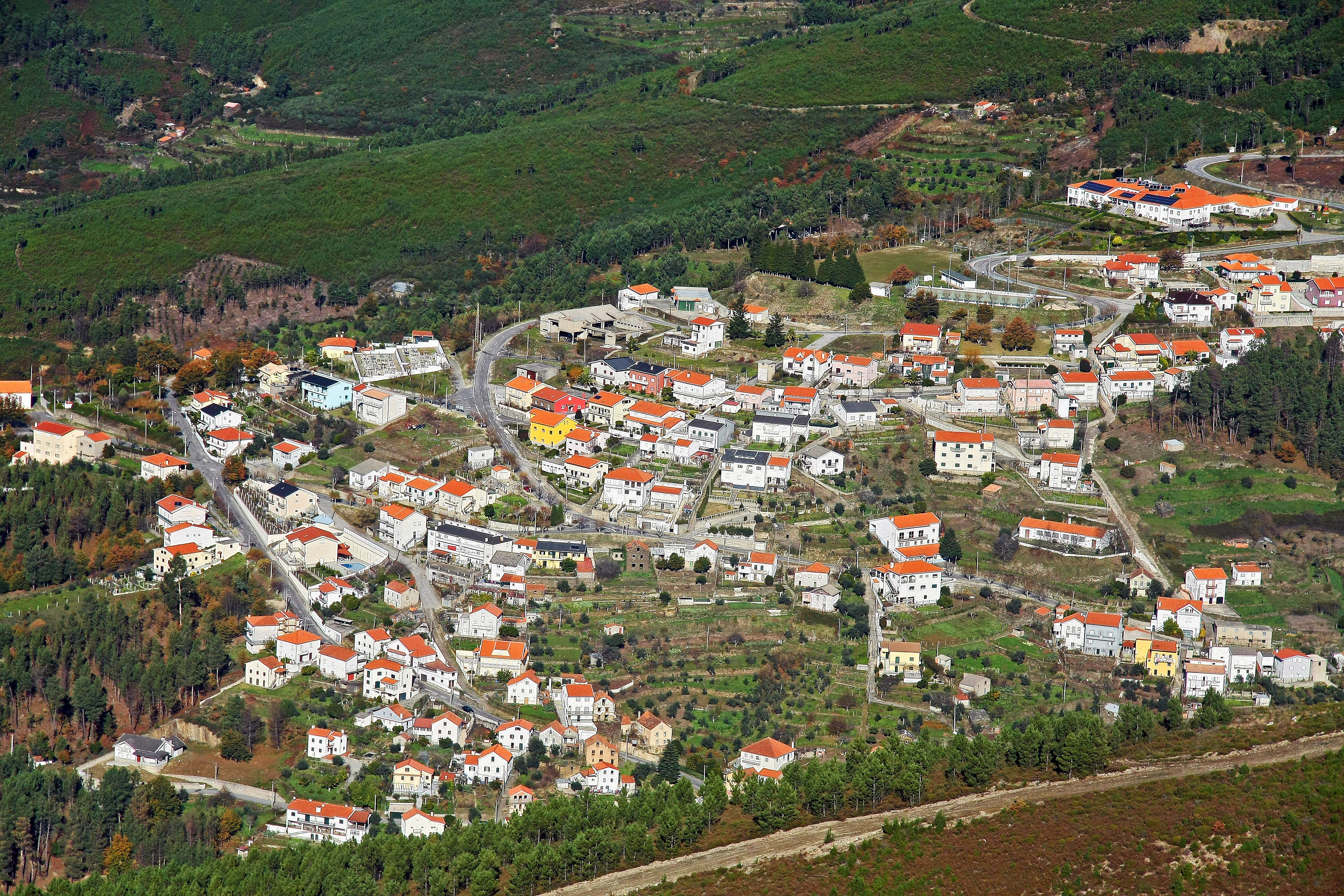

- Location in Portugal
- Coordinates: 40.349°N 7.735°W
- Country: Portugal
- Region: Centro
- Intermunic. comm.: Beiras e Serra da Estrela
- District: Guarda
- Municipality: Seia

Area
  - Total: 7.79 km^{2} (3.01 sq mi)

Population (2011)
  - Total: 283
  - Density: 36.3/km^{2} (94.1/sq mi)
- Time zone: UTC+00:00 (WET)
  - Summer (DST): UTC+01:00 (WEST)

Sazes da Beira is a Portuguese parish, located in the municipality of Seia. The population in 2011 was 283, in an area of 7.79 km^{2}.

Sazes’ mines were already explored by the Romans in V b.C. The village was founded by families of shepherds who come from Sandomil and Corgas (closest town and village respectively) looking for fertile territories near water. The first definitive fixation of people was in the 15th century, in the place known since the 18th century as Sazes Velho (“Old Sazes” literally). In 1527 the village had 65 inhabitants. However, in the pursue of lands more near the water, it was founded the village of Sazes da Beira. We can't know the date of the foundation of its freguesia, existing however parochial registers since 1612, that makes us suppose that the parish should have been created in the second half of the 16th century. In 1731 its church is edified. Since its foundation, Sazes belonged to the concelho of Sandomil until 1855, date when it was extinct and Sazes changed to the concelho of Seia. Only between 1836 and 1840 Sazes belonged to the concelho of Loriga. The biggest change in the village's social life come with the growing need of miners, especially for tungsten in the beginnings of the 20th century, which ended after World War II. The population was growing while the freguesia’s mines were explored. With the ending of the exportations of miners to Europe, the freguesia’s economy started to decline. In the 1960s, the freguesia had more than 670 inhabitants. As in the beginning of the 20th century, emigration returned as an alternative to the hard life of the fields and agriculture. But this time, neither Argentina nor Brazil were the destination of the people who left, but France, Germany and mainly, Luxembourg.
