= Algodres (Figueira de Castelo Rodrigo) =

Coordinates: 40°57′09″N 7°03′17″W

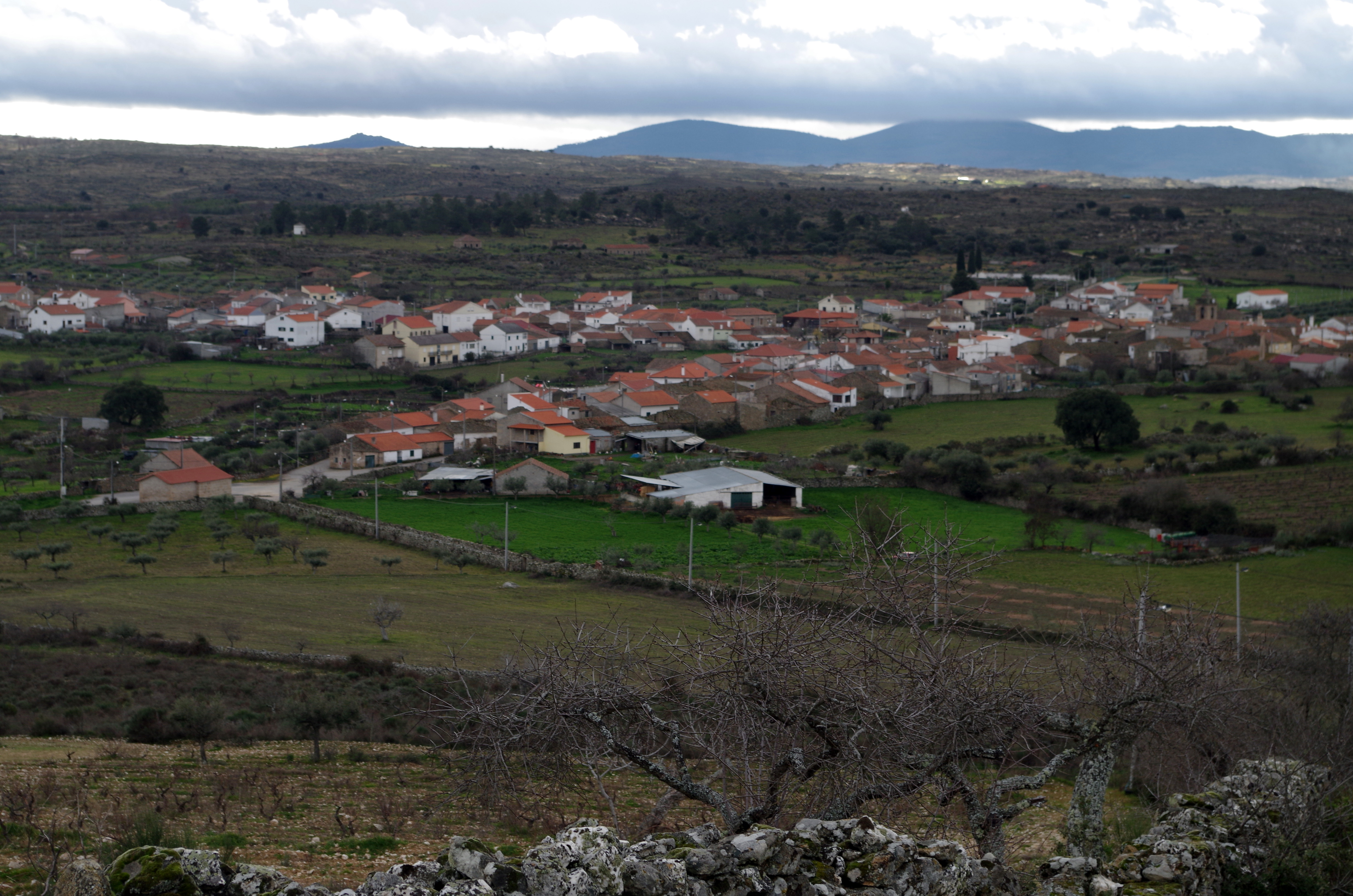
Algodres

Algodres is a former civil parish in the municipality of Figueira de Castelo Rodrigo, district of Guarda, Portugal. In 2013, the parish merged into the new parish Algodres, Vale de Alfonsinho e Vilar de Amargo. It has a population of 352 (2001) and an area of 32.16 km^{2}.
