= Serra da Marofa =

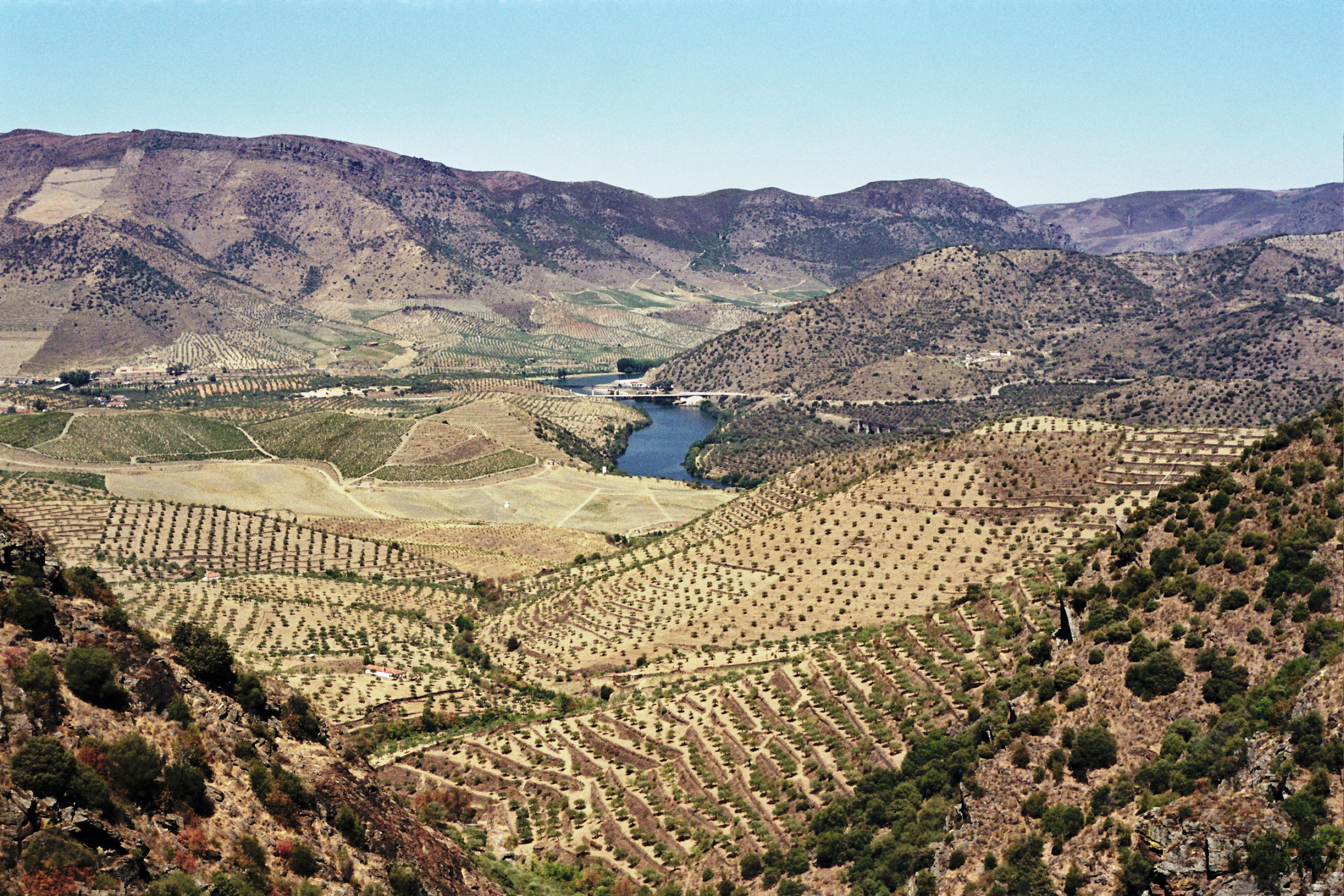

Highest point
- Elevation: 977 m (3,205 ft)
- Coordinates: 40°51′49.6″N 7°01′18″W

Geography
- Location within Portugal
- Country: Portugal
- Region: Centro

Serra da Marofa is a mountain ridge located in the municipality of Figueira de Castelo Rodrigo, Guarda district, Central Portugal reaching 977 m (3,205 ft) in altitude. In 1956, a statue of Christ the King was built on top of the mountain range.
