= Serra da Estrela Subregion =

Coordinates: 40°25′N 7°42′W

District of Serra da Estrela

Serra da Estrela (Portuguese pronunciation: [ˈsɛʁɐ ðɐ ɨʃˈtɾelɐ]) is a former NUTS3 statistical subregion of Portugal integrated in the NUTS2 Centro region that takes its name from the largest mountain range in Portugal - the Serra da Estrela. It was abolished at the January 2015 NUTS 3 revision.

Bordered to the north by Dão-Lafões, to the west by Beira Interior Norte, to south by Cova da Beira, and to the east by Pinhal Interior Norte the subregion contains the Serra da Estrela, the largest range and highest mountain in Portugal and much of the 1000 km^{2} Natural Park of Serra da Estrela. The subregion itself is only 867.8 km^{2}.

== Municipalities ==
It consists of 3 municipalities (Portuguese: concelhos) from the Guarda District:

- Fornos de Algodres
- Gouveia
- Seia
