= São Romão (Seia) =

Coordinates: 40°24′07″N 7°43′01″W

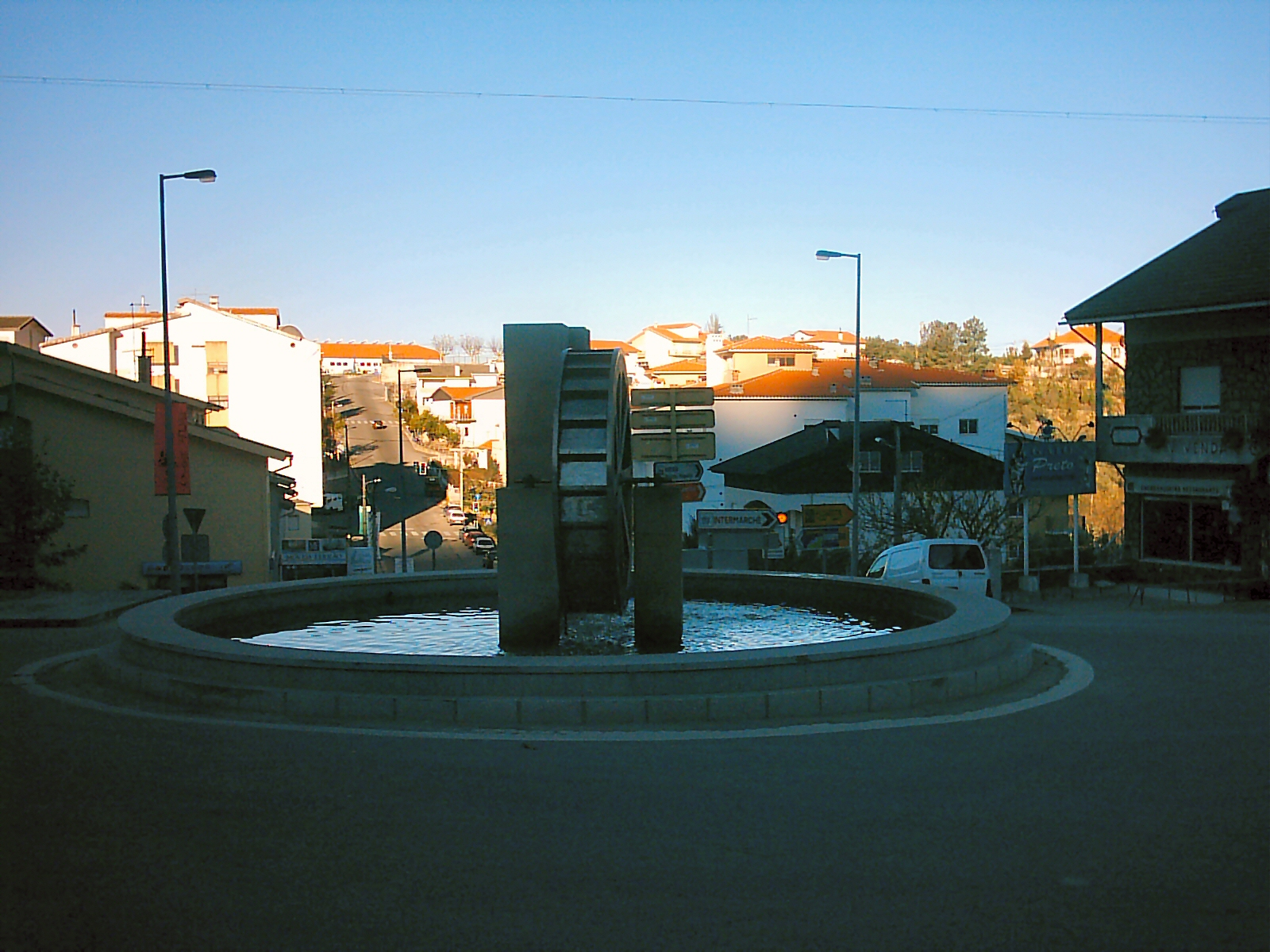

São Romão is a former civil parish in the municipality of Seia, Portugal. In 2013, the parish merged into the new parish Seia, São Romão e Lapa dos Dinheiros. It has a land area of 17.92 km^{2} and 6,500 inhabitants.

It was the county seat from the 13th century until 1836. It consisted of one parish and had, in 1801, 1426 inhabitants.

== Festivals and Fairs ==
- Festival of Saint Peter (last Sunday in June)
- Weekly Fair (Sunday)
- St. Silvester (January 1)
- St. Sebastian (April 20)
- Burial of the Lord (Friday of the Lord)
- St. Peter (last Sunday in June)
- São Romão (August 9)
- Our Lady of the Exile (August 15)

== Heritage ==
- Chapel of the eighteenth century
- Shrine of Our Lady of Exile
