= Algodres, Vale de Alfonsinho e Vilar de Amargo =

- Civil parish
- Location in Portugal
- Coordinates: 40.952°N 7.055°W
- Country: Portugal
- Region: Centro
- Intermunic. comm.: Beiras e Serra da Estrela
- District: Guarda
- Municipality: Figueira de Castelo Rodrigo

Area
  - Total: 72.36 km^{2} (27.94 sq mi)

Population (2011)
  - Total: 535
  - Density: 7.39/km^{2} (19.1/sq mi)
- Time zone: UTC+00:00 (WET)
  - Summer (DST): UTC+01:00 (WEST)

Algodres, Vale de Alfonsinho e Vilar de Amargo is a civil parish in the municipality of Figueira de Castelo Rodrigo, Portugal. It was formed in 2013 by the merger of the former parishes Algodres, Vale de Alfonsinho and Vilar de Amargo. The population in 2011 was 535, in an area of 72.36 km^{2}.
