= Sobral Pichorro e Fuinhas =

- Civil parish
- Location in Portugal
- Coordinates: 40.692°N 7.459°W
- Country: Portugal
- Region: Centro
- Intermunic. comm.: Beiras e Serra da Estrela
- District: Guarda
- Municipality: Fornos de Algodres

Area
  - Total: 15.17 km^{2} (5.86 sq mi)

Population (2011)
  - Total: 300
  - Density: 20/km^{2} (51/sq mi)
- Time zone: UTC+00:00 (WET)
  - Summer (DST): UTC+01:00 (WEST)

Sobral Pichorro e Fuinhas is a civil parish in the municipality of Fornos de Algodres, Portugal. It was formed in 2013 by the merger of the former parishes Sobral Pichorro and Fuinhas. The population in 2011 was 300, in an area of 15.17 km^{2}.
