= Castle of Castelo Rodrigo =

Castle in Guarda District, Portugal

Coordinates: 40.877374°N 6.964265°W

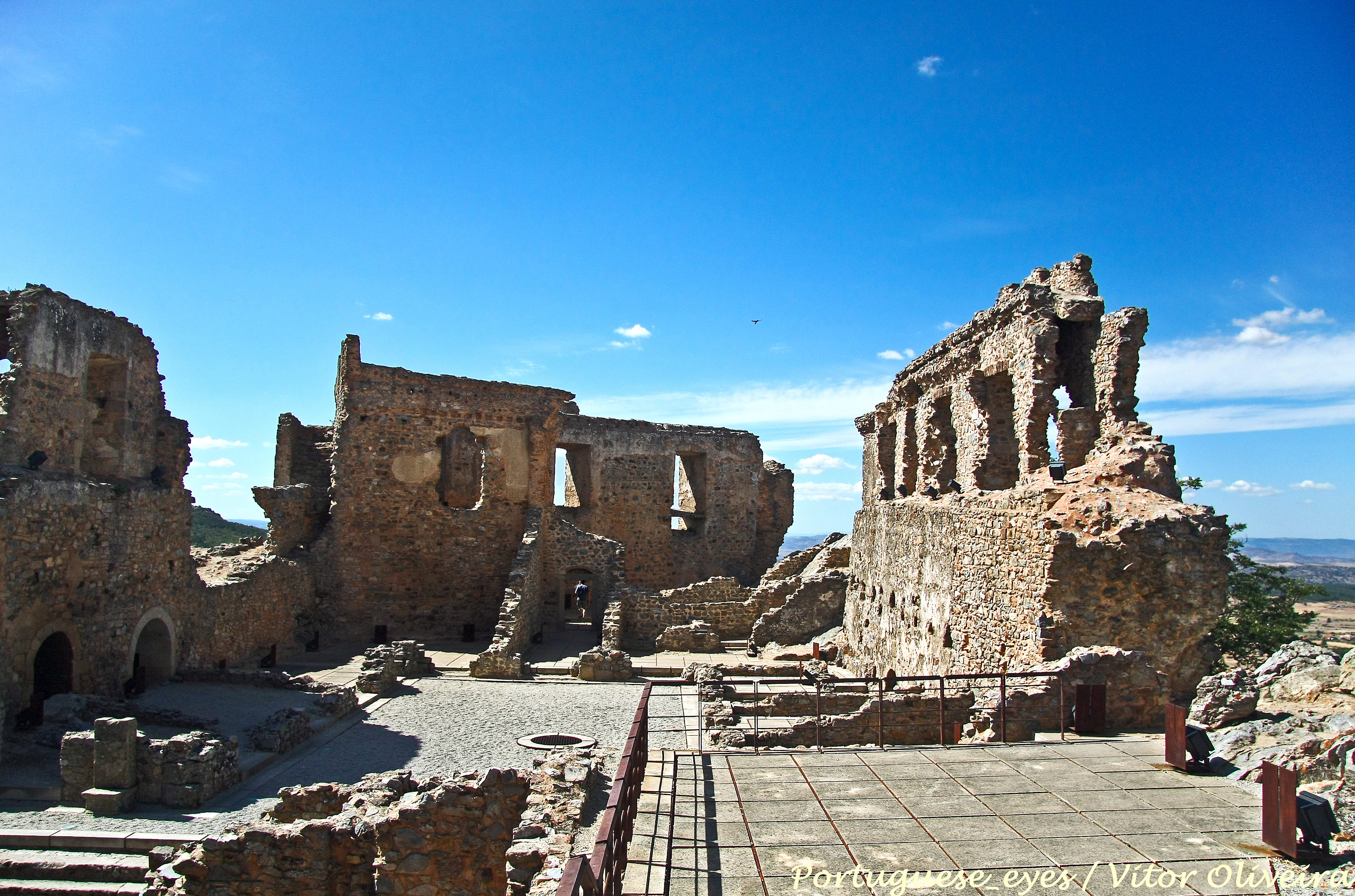
Ruins of the castle

The Castle of Castelo Rodrigo (Portuguese: Castelo de Castelo Rodrigo) is a medieval castle in the civil parish of Castelo Rodrigo in the municipality of Figueira de Castelo Rodrigo, district of Guarda in Portugal.

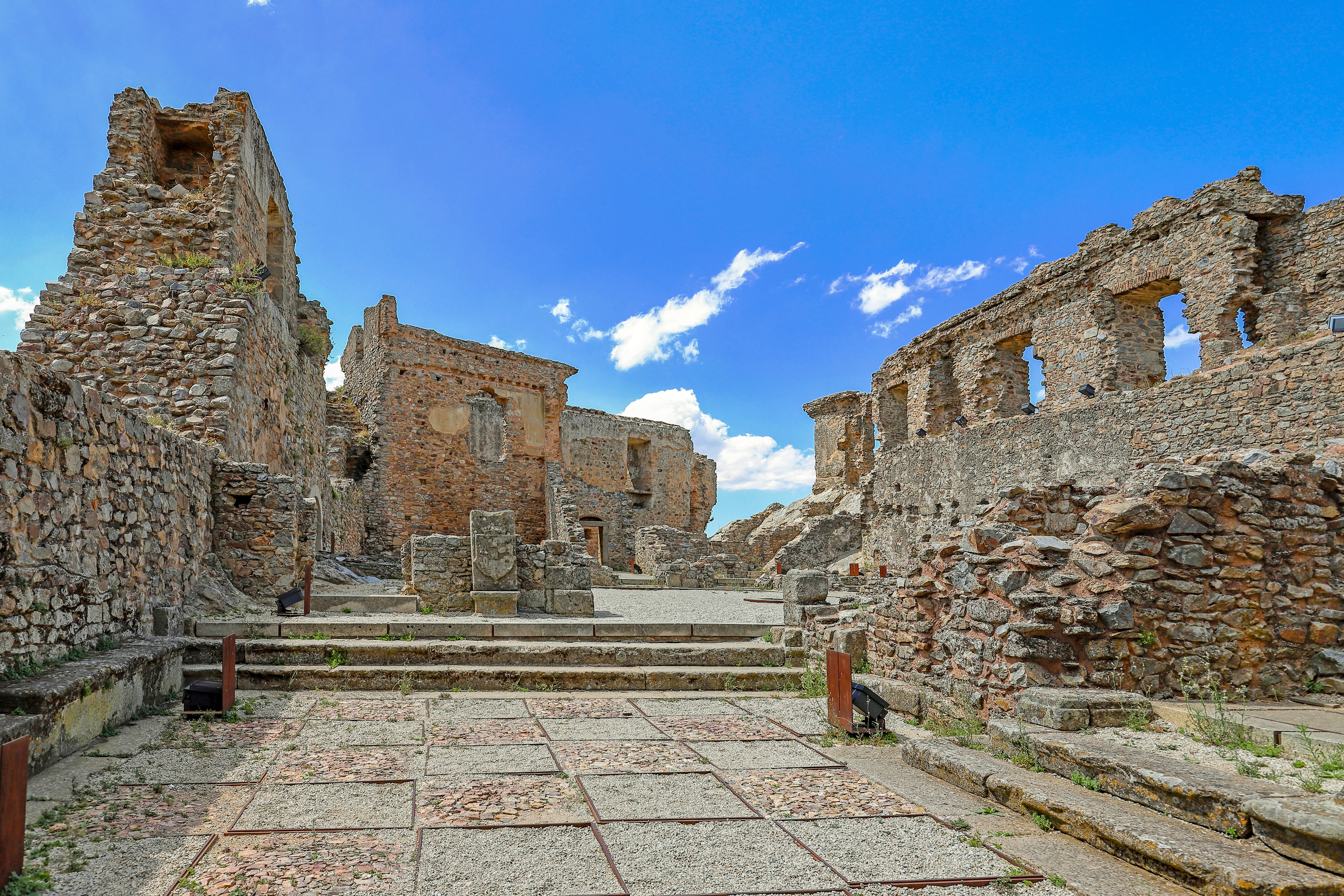
Ruinas interiores

== History ==
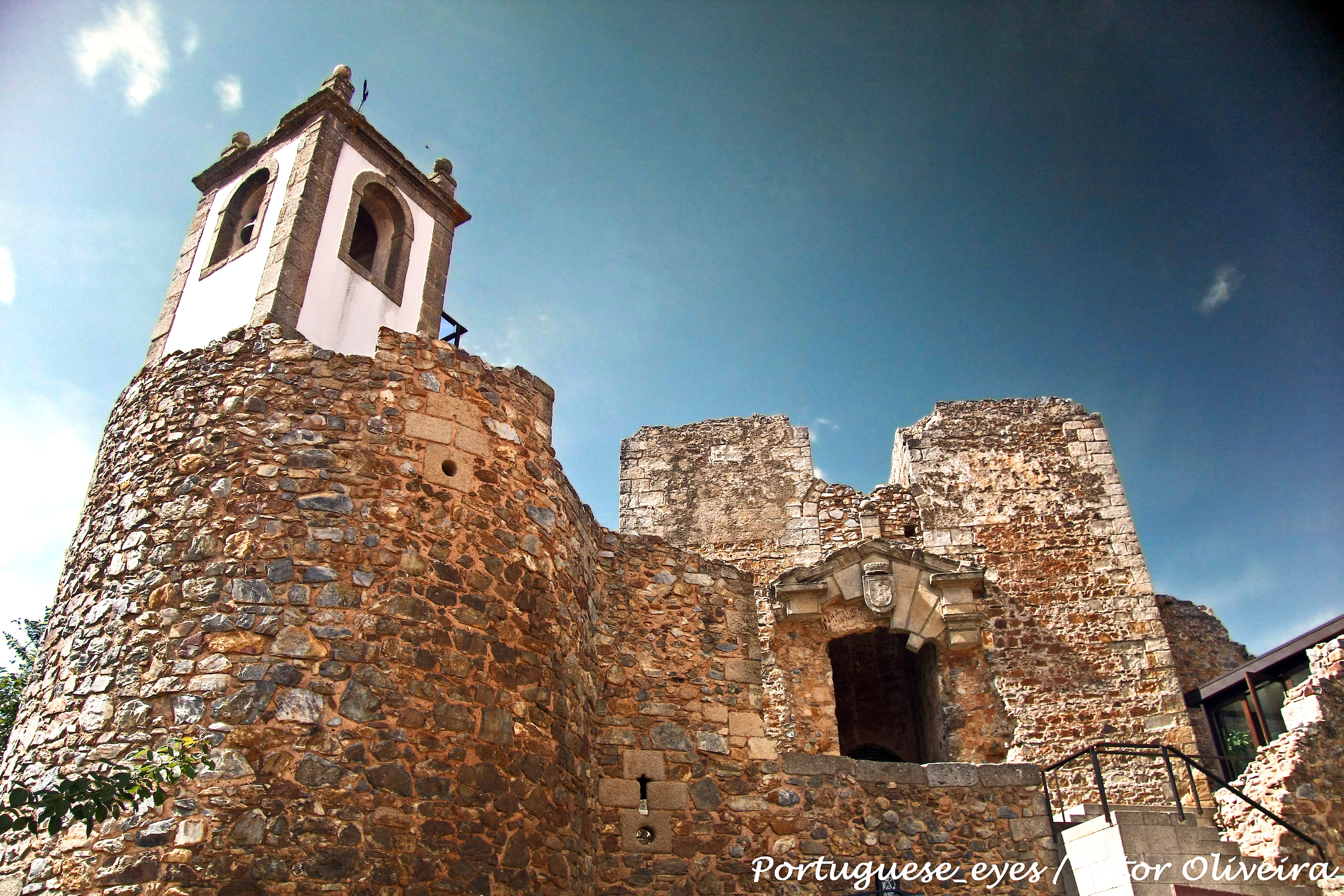

It is believed that the castle was founded in the 6th century based on legends. After the village was conquered by Alfonso IX of León in the late 11th/early 12th century, he ordered to build the castle and reinforce the defensive line. The name of the village, as well as the castle comes from the name of the Count Rodrigo Gonzalez de Girón who was responsible for the defense of the castle. The Castelo Rodrigo was incorporated into the Kingdom of Portugal in 1297 with the Treaty of Alcañices between King Denis of Portugal and King Fernando IV of Castile.

The fortress and walled fence were rebuilt, and 13 turrets, Menagem Tower (keep), a barbican and moats were constructed by D.Denis in the 14th century.

It has been listed as a National monument since 1922.

== Architecture ==
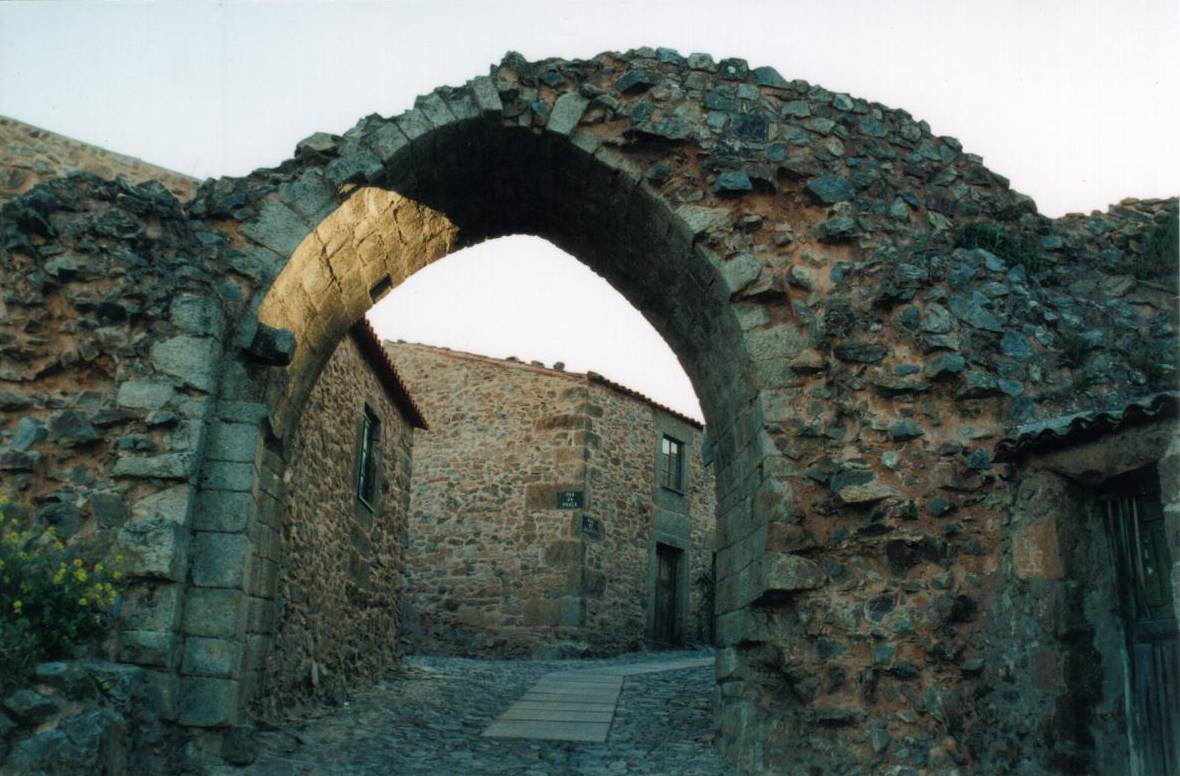
Arch

The configuration of the castle surrounding the village is oval. Existing sections of wall have attached constructions, with the exception in North and East sides. In the West and South sides of the castle there are towers or turrets in circular shape of which 4 are still standing with their collapsed tops.

On the East there is a quadrangular ledge, and on the North there is a partially crumbled square-shaped tower. Three doors are remaining: the Door of the Sun (turned to the East), the Door of the Alverca (turned to the North) and the Door of Betrayal.

== See also ==
- Castles in Portugal
