= Alminhas =

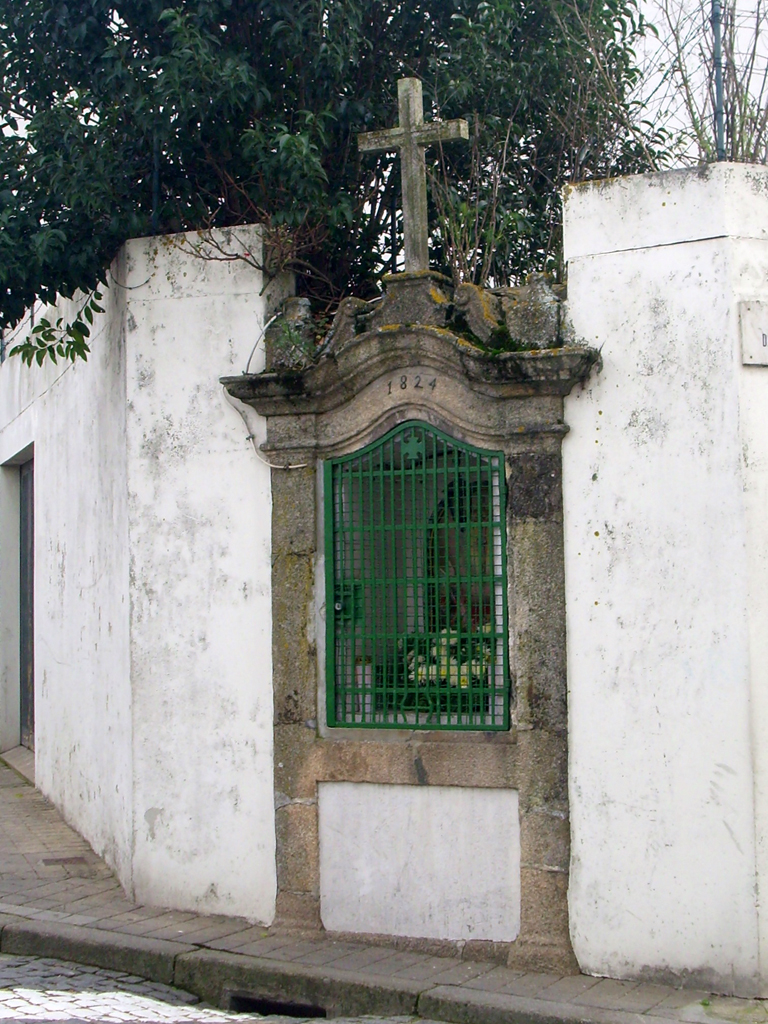
Alminha built in 1824. All alminhas shrines follow this stonework pattern, with some style changes through the years.

Alminhas or Nichos de Alminhas do Purgatório are a type of wayside shrine typical of Póvoa de Varzim, Portugal. These small shrines are mostly urban and represent souls in Purgatory.

Alminhas are located in several streets of the city, often at crossroads. They are generally stonework, with a small niche protected by an iron grid that is kept by the Confraria das Almas (Souls Brotherhood), with an azulejo panel invoking the souls of Purgatory. Older alminhas in the city center such as Rua da Conceição-Rua Primeiro de Maio Alminha or Rua dos Ferreiros-Praça do Almada Alminha have a more elaborate niche, resembling an altarpiece.

Traditionally, passers-by would pray and offer alms when passing one in the street. Candles, flowers and alms can be placed in the niche. The city's alminhas are well preserved and kept by the brotherhood. However, due to theft and damage of the shrines, some alminhas no longer accept alms.

== List ==
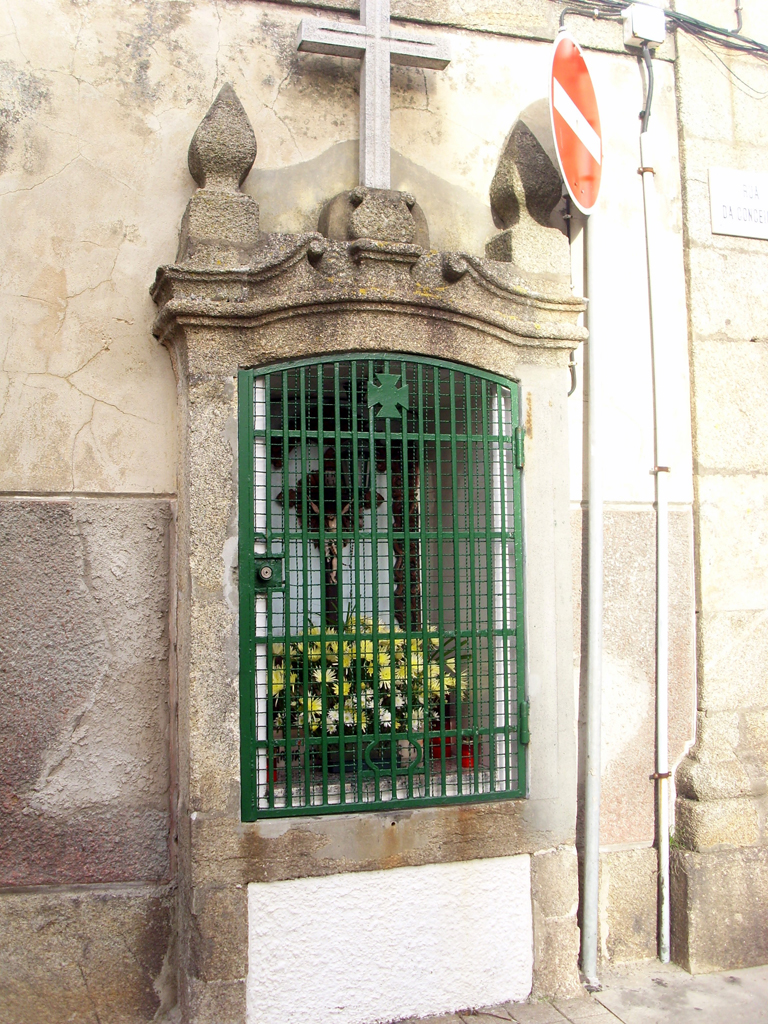
Baroque Alminha in an 18th-century house.

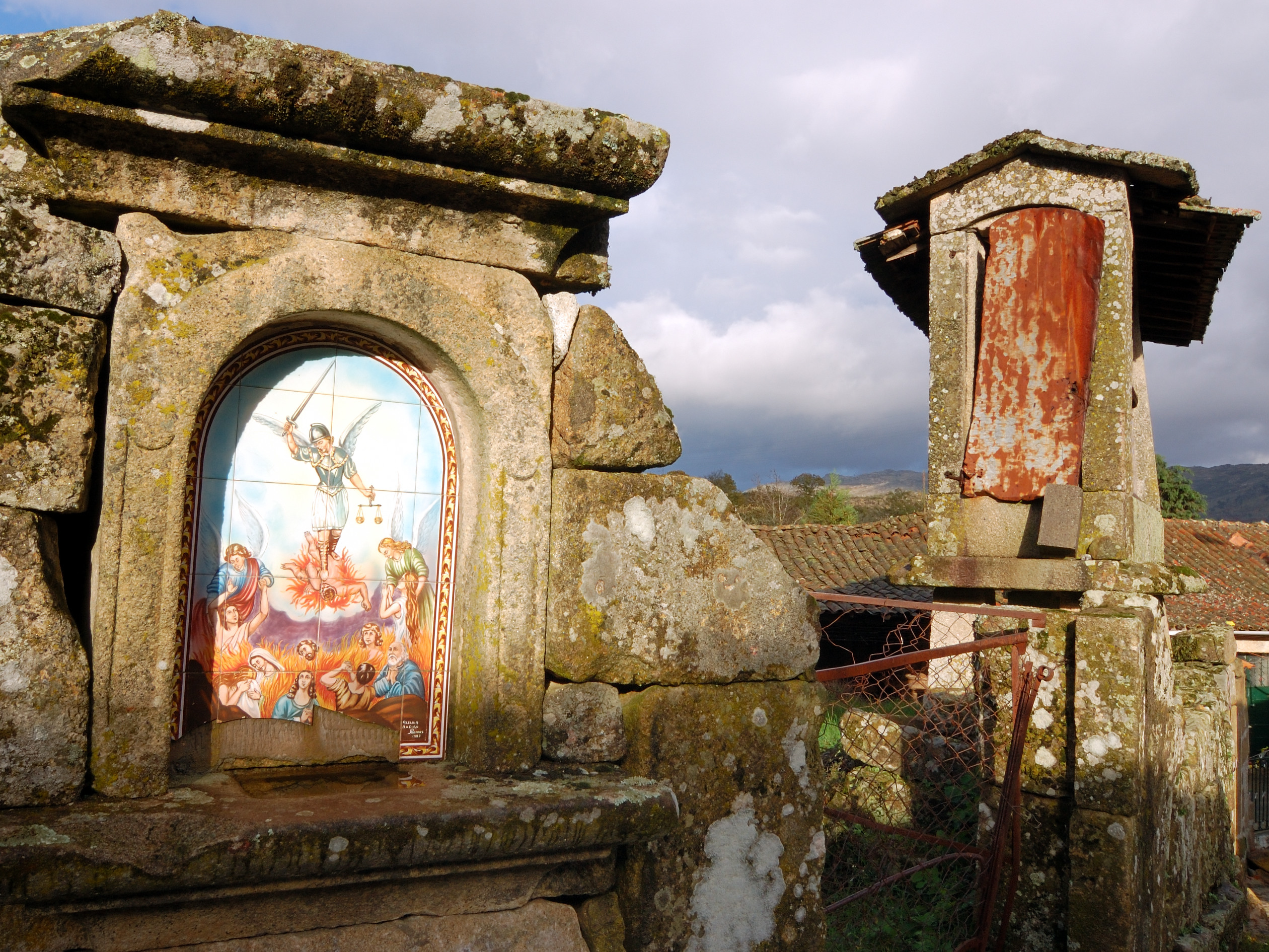
Alminhas e espigueiro em Vilarinho de Samardã, Vila Real.

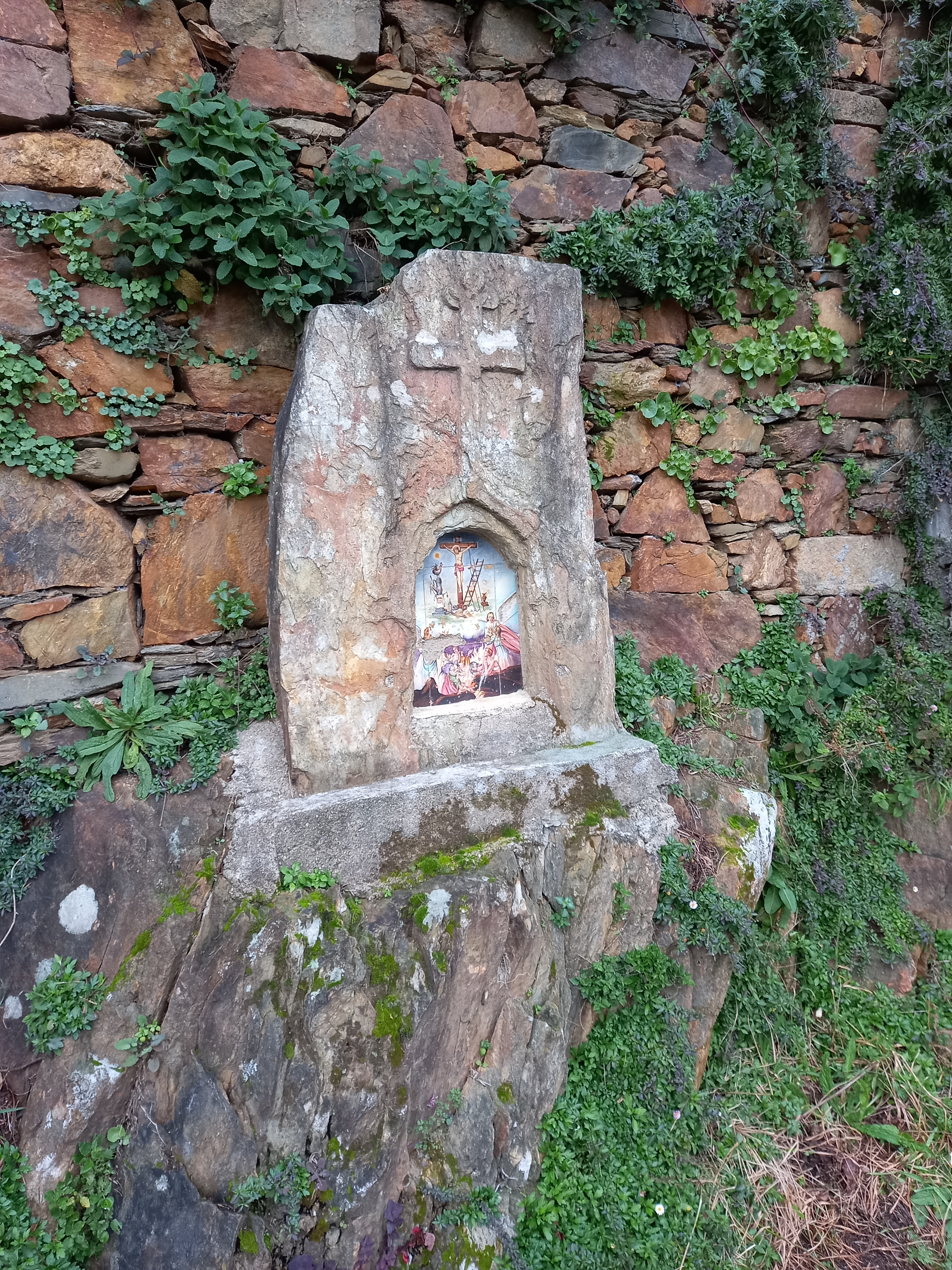
Alminha localizada na aldeia de Cabeça, Seia, Guarda.

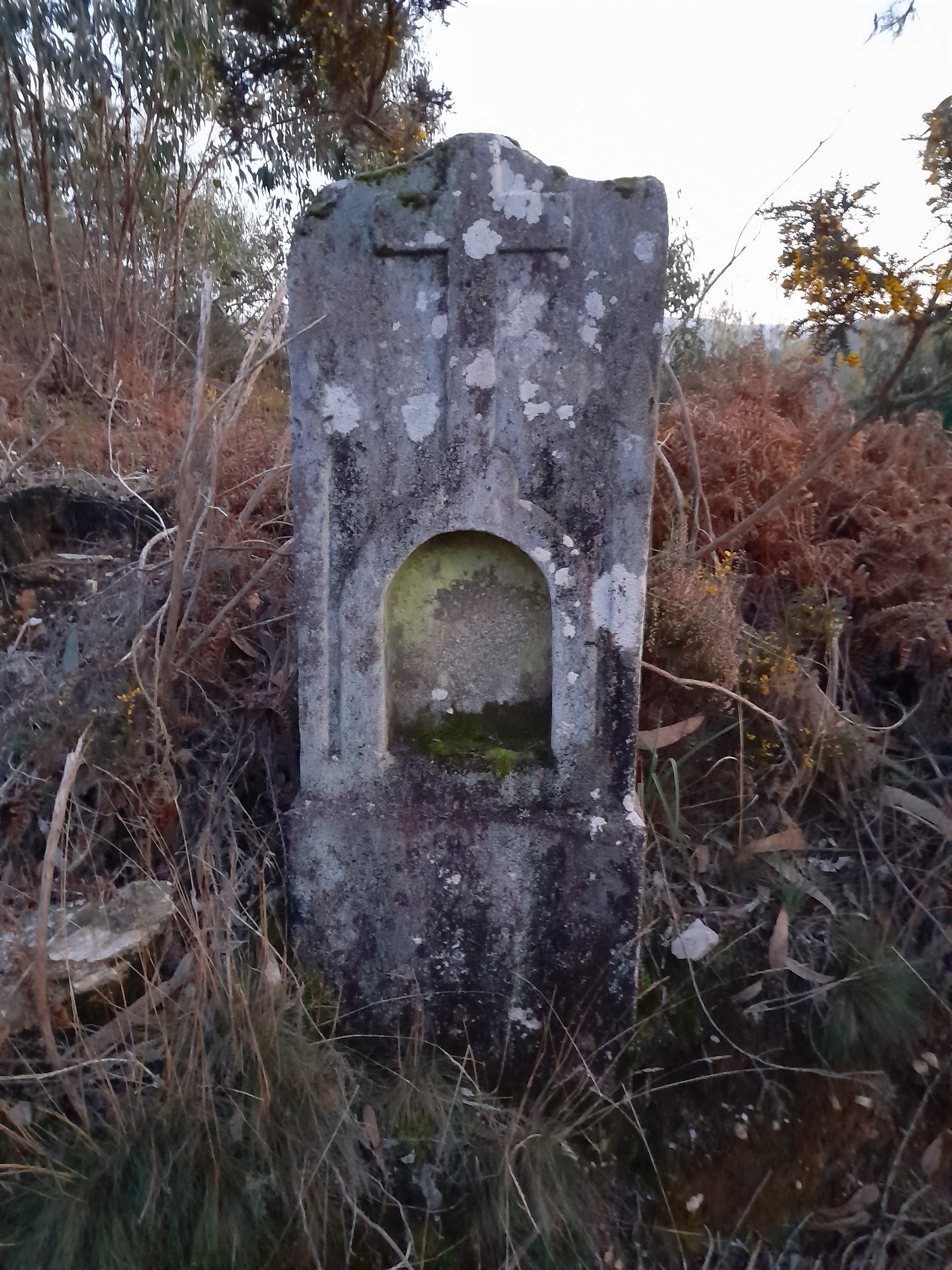
Alminhas na Serra da Ermida, Sever do Vouga, Aveiro.

Incomplete list, with year and crossroad location:

- Alminha: Rua da Conceição - Rua Primeiro de Maio;
- 1824 Alminha: Rua de São Pedro - Rua da Moita;
- 1874 Alminha: Rua Corregedor Gaspar Cardoso - Rua dos Muros Altos;
- Alminha: Rua Bonitos de Amorim - Largo das Dores;
- 1953 Alminha: Rua Gomes de Amorim - Praça Luís de Camões;
- 1966 Alminha: Rua Bonitos de Amorim - Rua Comendador Francisco Quintas;
- 1971 Alminha: Rua Leonardo Coimbra - Rua de Camilo;
- Alminha: Rua dos Ferreiros - Praça do Almada;
- Alminha: Avenida dos Pescadores - Rua das Flores;
- Alminha: Travessa de Regufe - Rua de São Brás;
- Niche: Rua António Silveira - Rua Tenente Veiga Leal.
