= Barregão =

Coordinates: 40°42′N 7°06′W

Barregão is a small Portuguese village located in the district of Guarda. It is located in the parish of Lameiras, municipality of Pinhel. It is the site of large old stone crucifix, the Cruzeiro do Barregão.
