= Algodre =

Place in Castile and León, Spain

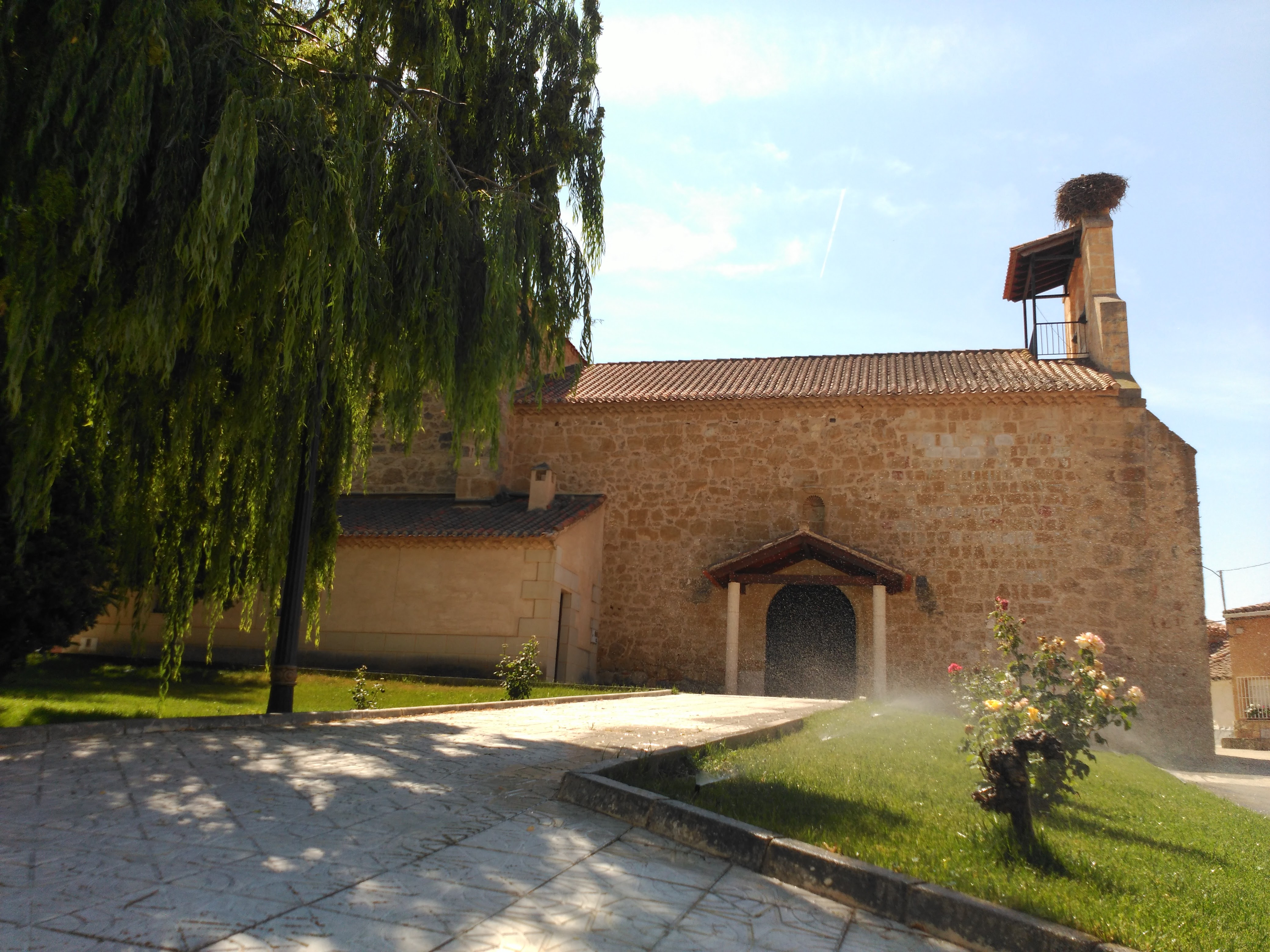

- Algadore
- Coordinates: 41.5655°N 5.6046°W
- Country: Spain
- Autonomous community: Castile and León
- Province: Zamora
- Municipality: Algodre

Area
  - Total: 18 km^{2} (6.9 sq mi)

Population (2025-01-01)
  - Total: 131
  - Density: 7.3/km^{2} (19/sq mi)
- Time zone: UTC+1 (CET)
  - Summer (DST): UTC+2 (CEST)
- Climate: BSk

Algodre is a municipality located in the province of Zamora, Castile and León, Spain. According to the 2004 census (INE), the municipality had a population of 181. It is north of Gallegos del Pan, south of Coreses and west of Molacillos.

== Geography ==
Relief is defined by the small valley formed by the stream of Algodre and the hilltops near the town, highlighting the Teso Mayo (784 m). The Algodres stream crosses part of Tierra de Campos and flows into the Douro.
