= Algodres (Fornos de Algodres) =

- Civil parish
- Location in Portugal
- Coordinates: 40.646°N 7.516°W
- Country: Portugal
- Region: Centro
- Intermunic. comm.: Beiras e Serra da Estrela
- District: Guarda
- Municipality: Fornos de Algodres

Area
  - Total: 10.15 km^{2} (3.92 sq mi)

Population (2011)
  - Total: 349
  - Density: 34/km^{2} (89/sq mi)
- Time zone: UTC+00:00 (WET)
  - Summer (DST): UTC+01:00 (WEST)

Algodres is a Portuguese civil parish (freguesia) in the municipality of Fornos de Algodres, district of Guarda. The population in 2011 was 349, in an area of 10.15 km^{2}.
