= Sebastião Fernandes da Costa =

Portuguese politician

- Born: 17 December 1842; Seia, Portugal
- Died: 27 August 1889 (aged 46); Portugal
- Occupations: Lawyer and politician

Sebastião Fernandes da Costa ([17 December 1842 – 27 August 1889) was a Portuguese lawyer and politician.

His parents were Manuel da Costa (b. Seia, Santa Marinha, – c. 1887), a small landowner who was remembered by his grandson as carrying his hoe at the end of the day, and wife Clara de Jesus (b. in Oliveira do Hospital, Lagares, –).

He was a Bachelor graduated in Law by the University of Coimbra and became a lawyer. He became the Conservator of the Predial Registration and Mayor of Seia, and also Judge of the Brotherhood of the Holy Sacrament of Seia.

He had three children who were exposed at birth at the wheel of the Santa Casa da Misericórdia (Holy House of Mercy) of Seia and registered as children of unknown parents. Their mother was Ana Augusta Pereira (Oliveira do Hospital, Lagos da Beira, 10 February 1838 – Lisbon, Rua Duque de Palmela, at her son Afonso's home, 23 May 1915), daughter of Tiago Ferrão (Oliveira do Hospital, Meruge, Nogueirinha, 1 August 1804 – died a victim as a consequence of the persecutions of the malefactor João Brandão) and wife Maria Pereira (Oliveira do Hospital, Lagos da Beira, 1 September 1809 –), a widow woman weaver at Gouveia precociously blind. Later he and their mother recognized them and they married at Seia, Seia on 13 April 1885. Their children were:

- Artur Augusto da Costa, born at Seia, Santa Marinha, on 13 February 1868, recognised by his father on 13 April 1881 and by his mother on 25 October 1884
- Maria Augusta da Costa, born at Seia, Santa Marinha, on 25 February 1870 and died in 1884, posthumously recognised by her father on 13 April 1881 and by her mother on 25 October 1884
- Afonso Augusto da Costa, born Afonso Maria de Ligório at Seia, Santa Marinha, 6 March 1871, recognised by his father on 13 April 1881 and by his mother on 25 October 1884
