= Escalhão =

Parish in Portugal

Escalhão Escalhão
- Parish in Portugal
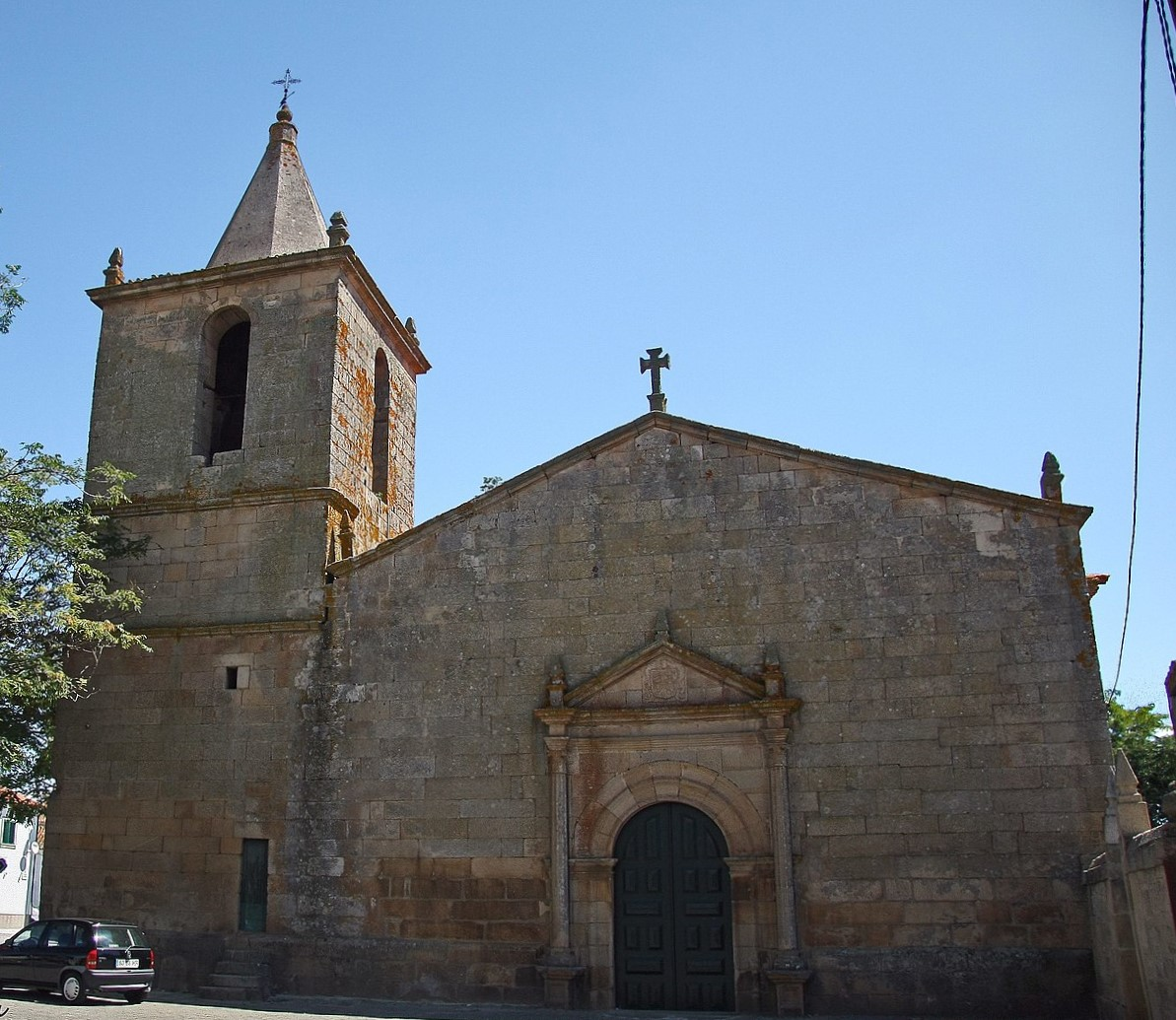
- Church of Escalhão, 2019

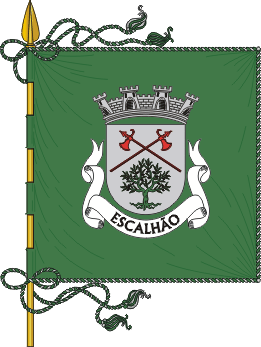
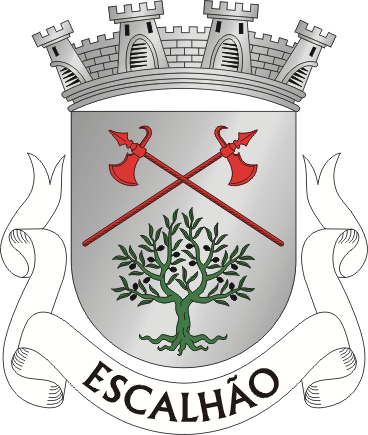
- Flag Coat of arms
- Interactive map of Escalhão
- Country: Portugal
- District: Guarda
- Municipality: Figueira de Castelo Rodrigo
- Parish: Escalhão

Government
  - Type: Junta de Freguesia

Area
  - Total: 78.81 km^{2} (30.43 sq mi)

Population (2021)
  - Total: 566
  - Density: 7.18/km^{2} (18.6/sq mi)
- Postal code: 6440
- Website: https://portalautarquico.dgal.gov.pt/pt-PT/entidades-locais/freguesias/escalhao--figueira-de-castelo-rodrigo-/

Escalhão is a Portuguese parish and village in the municipality of Figueira de Castelo Rodrigo, Guarda district with 566 inhabitants (2021 census).
