= Fornos de Algodres =

- Municipality
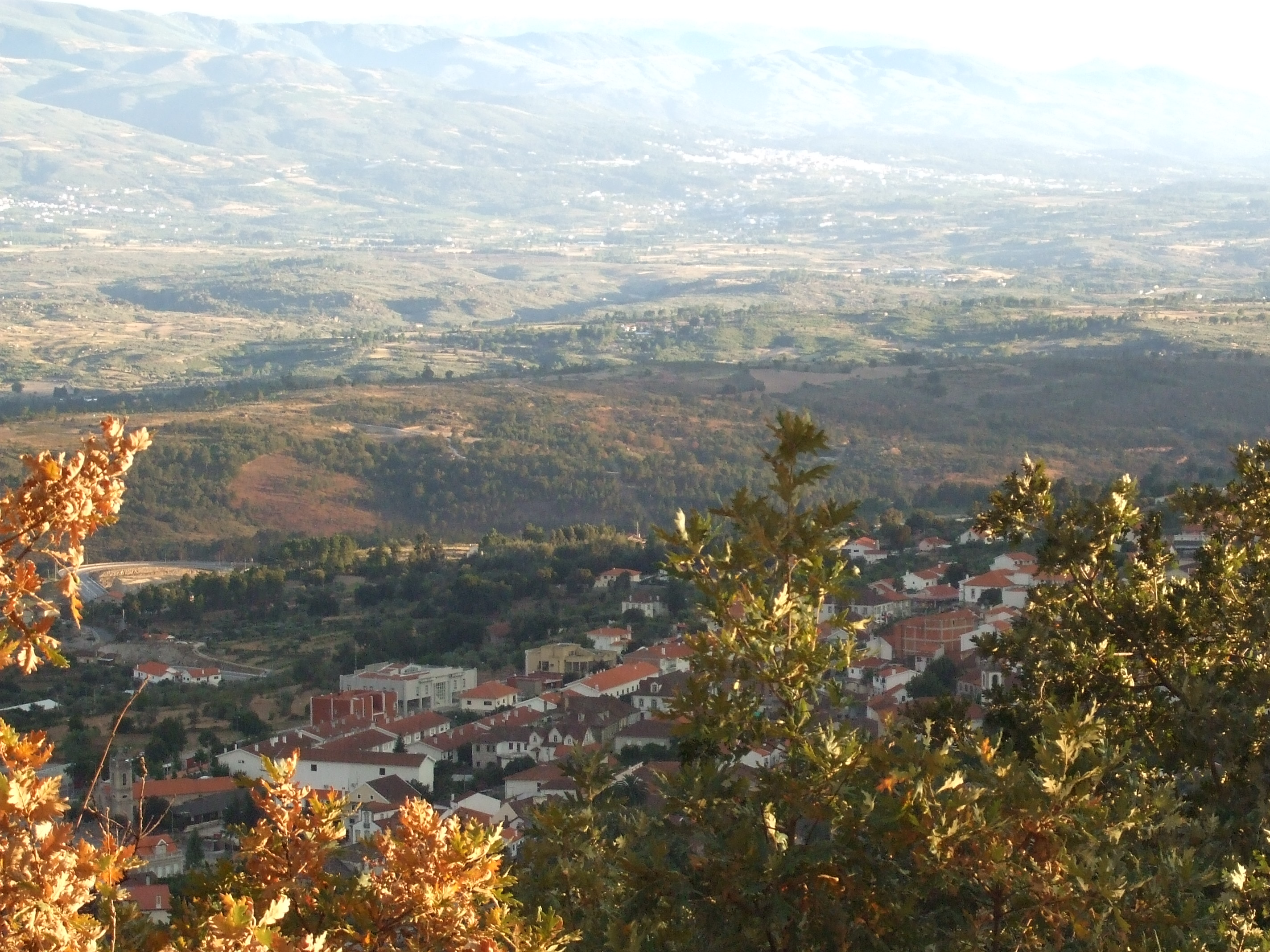

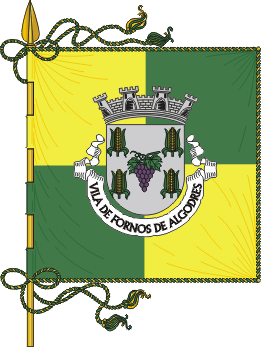
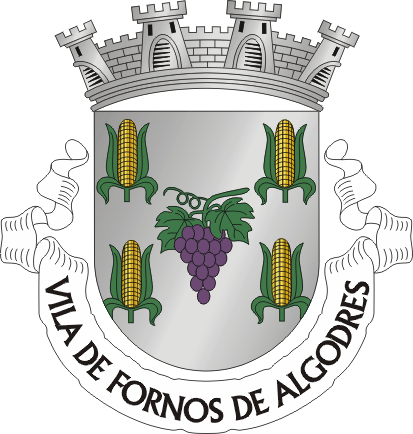
- Flag Coat of arms
- Interactive map of Fornos de Algodres
- Location in Portugal
- Coordinates: 40°37′N 7°32′W
- Country: Portugal
- Region: Centro
- Intermunic. comm.: Beiras e Serra da Estrela
- District: Guarda
- Seat: Fornos de Algodres Municipal Chamber
- Parishes: 12

Government
  - President: Manuel Fonseca (PS)

Area
  - Total: 131.45 km^{2} (50.75 sq mi)

Population (2011)
  - Total: 4,989
  - Density: 37.95/km^{2} (98.30/sq mi)
- Time zone: UTC+00:00 (WET)
  - Summer (DST): UTC+01:00 (WEST)
- Local holiday: Saint Michael; September 29
- Website: http://www.cm-fornosdealgodres.pt

Fornos de Algodres (pronounced [ˈfɔɾnuʒ ð(ɨ) alˈɣoðɾɨʃ]) is a municipality and a town in Portugal. The population in 2011 was 4,989, in an area of 131.45 km^{2}. The municipality is located in Guarda District, Centro Region, Serra da Estrela Subregion. The present Mayor is Manuel Fonseca, elected by the Social Democratic Party. The municipal holiday is September 29.

The seat of the municipality, Fornos de Algodres, is a historic town boasting panoramic views of the upper Mondego River Valley and a nineteenth-century market with nearby winding cobbled streets. It also offers views of the Serra da Estrela, the highest mountain range in mainland Portugal. Cities nearby: Mangualde, Gouveia, Seia, Guarda, Viseu, Trancoso, Pinhel.

Gastronomy: Queijo da Serra (hard cheese); requeijões (soft cheese). Train station: Fornos de Algodres Linha da Beira Alta.

== Parishes ==
Administratively, the municipality is divided into 12 civil parishes (freguesias):

- Algodres
- Casal Vasco
- Cortiçô e Vila Chã
- Figueiró da Granja
- Fornos de Algodres (Town/Vila)
- Infias
- Juncais, Vila Ruiva e Vila Soeiro do Chão
- Maceira
- Matança
- Muxagata
- Queiriz
- Sobral Pichorro e Fuinhas

== Notable people ==
- António Bernardo da Costa Cabral, 1st Marquis of Tomar (1803–1889) a Portuguese statesman.
- António Borges (1898–1959) equestrian, bronze medallist in the 1924 Summer Olympics.
- Daniel Candeias (born 1988) a footballer with over 380 club caps
- Luisinho (born 1990) a footballer with over 350 club caps
