= Gallegos del Pan =

Coordinates: 41°36′N 5°34′W

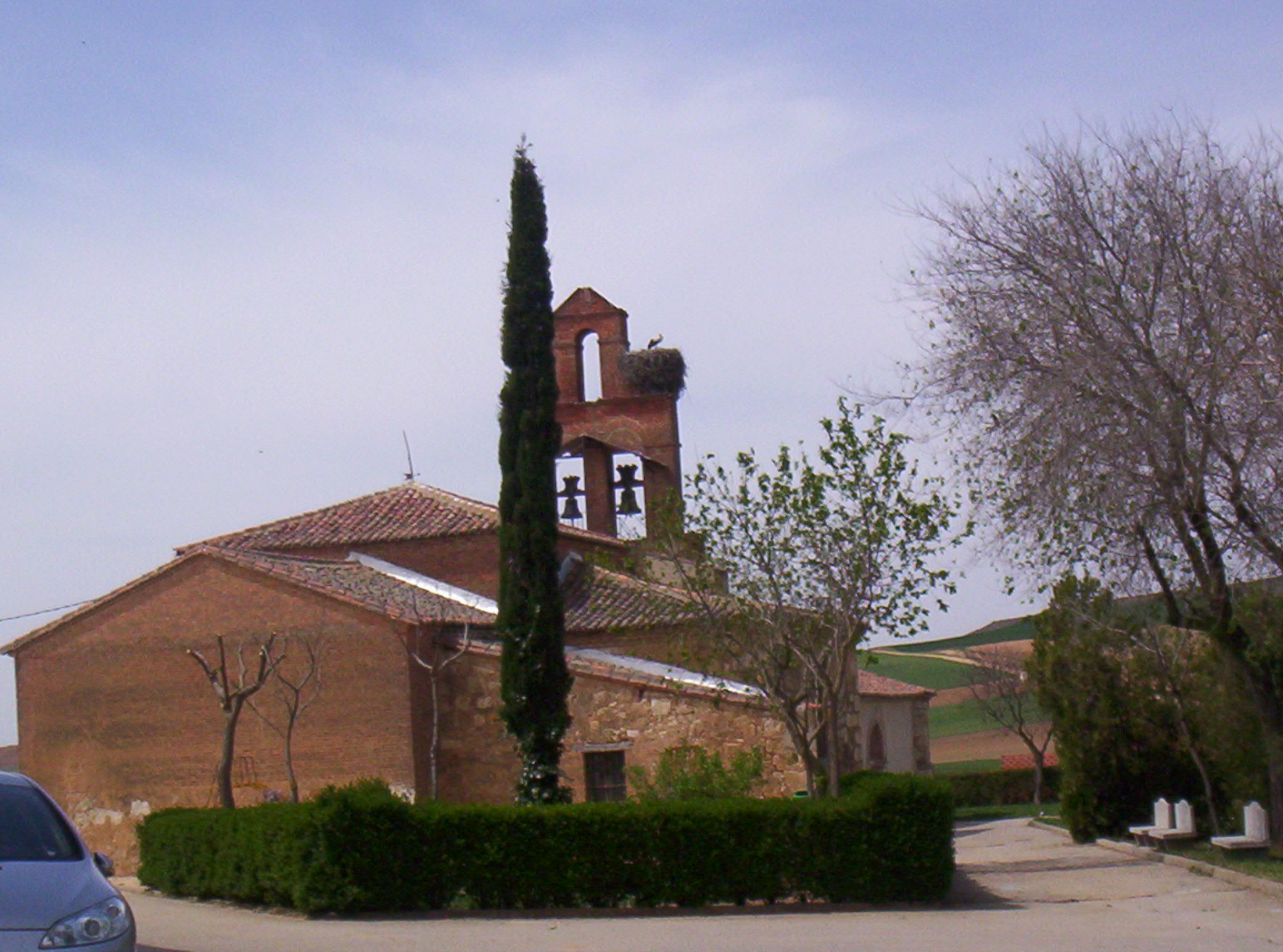

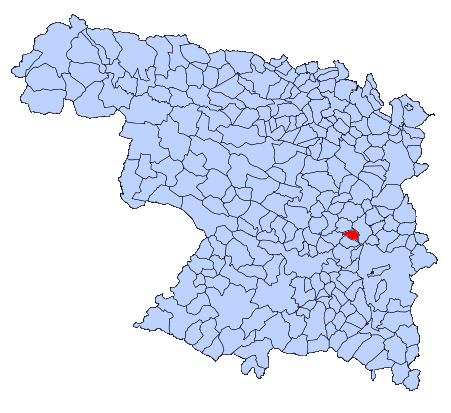
- Country: Spain
- Autonomous community: Castile and León
- Province: Zamora
- Municipality: Gallegos del Pan

Area
  - Total: 15 km^{2} (5.8 sq mi)

Population (2025-01-01)
  - Total: 118
  - Density: 7.9/km^{2} (20/sq mi)
- Time zone: UTC+1 (CET)
  - Summer (DST): UTC+2 (CEST)

Gallegos del Pan is a municipality located in the province of Zamora, Castile and León, Spain. According to the 2009 census (INE), the municipality has a population of 139 inhabitants.
