= Figueira de Castelo Rodrigo =

- Municipality
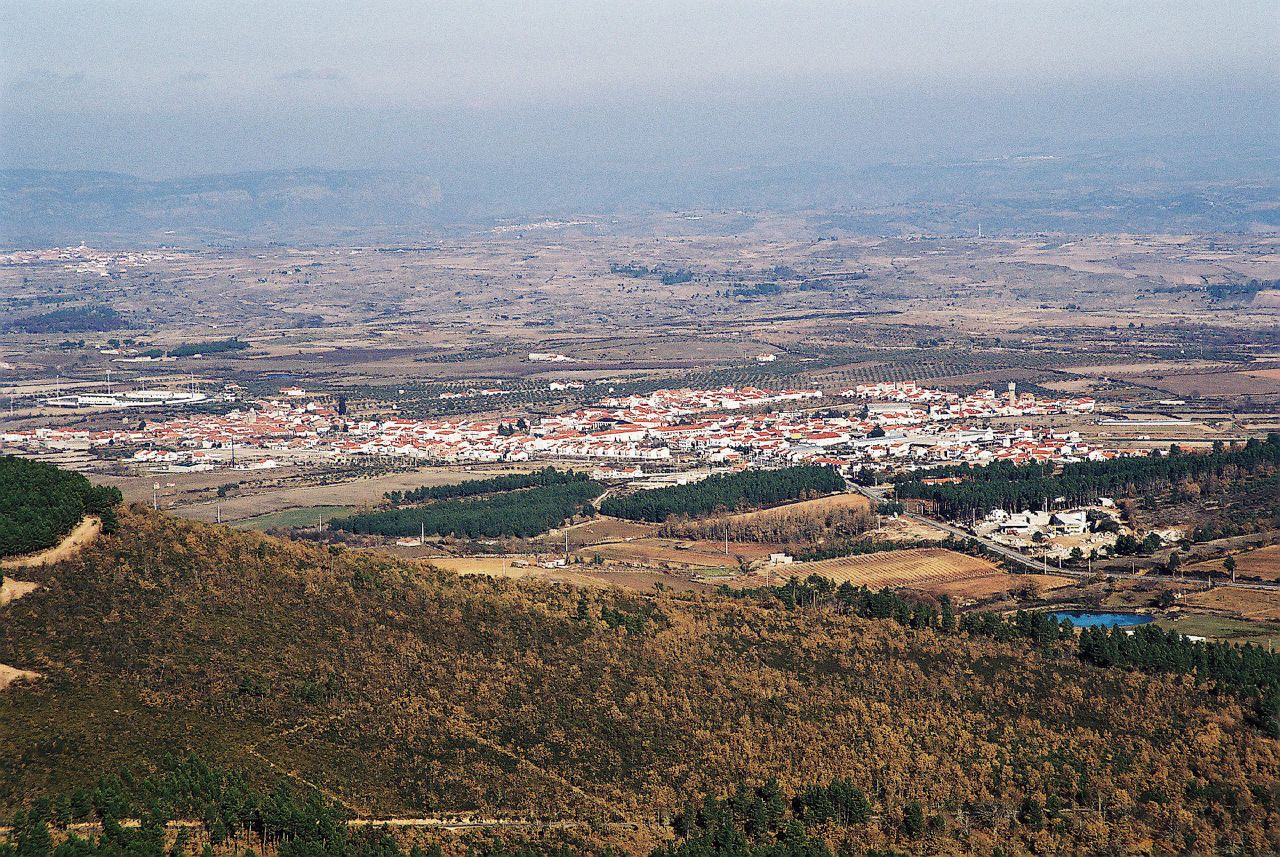

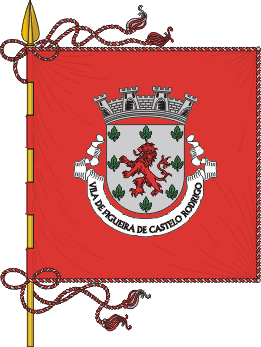
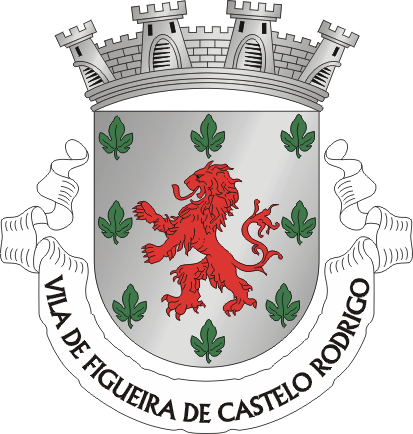
- Flag Coat of arms
- Interactive map of Figueira de Castelo Rodrigo
- Location in Portugal
- Coordinates: 40°53′N 6°57′W
- Country: Portugal
- Region: Centro
- Intermunic. comm.: Beiras e Serra da Estrela
- District: Guarda
- Seat: Figueira de Castelo Rodrigo Municipal Chamber
- Parishes: 10

Government
  - President: Carlos Condesso (PSD)

Area
  - Total: 508.57 km^{2} (196.36 sq mi)

Population (2021)
  - Total: 5,150
  - Density: 10.1/km^{2} (26.2/sq mi)
- Time zone: UTC+00:00 (WET)
  - Summer (DST): UTC+01:00 (WEST)
- Local holiday: July 7
- Website: http://www.cm-fcr.pt

Figueira de Castelo Rodrigo (European Portuguese pronunciation: [fiˈɣɐjɾɐ ðɨ kɐʃˈtɛlu ʁuˈðɾiɣu]) is a municipality in the District of Guarda in Portugal. The population in 2011 was 5,150, in an area of 508.57 km^{2}. Located in the Riba Coa (near the River Coa), just like other municipalities around Riba Coa, such as Almeida, Meda, Pinhel and Sabugal. Known for its castle which is a listed National monument, as well as pine-wood forests and rolling hills.

The municipality borders the frontier with Spain, formed by the Águeda River, a tributary of the Douro, which it joins at Barca D'Alva, approximately 18 km north of Figueira de Castelo Rodrigo town.

The present Mayor is Carlos Condesso, elected by the Social Democratic Party. The municipal holiday is July 7.

Figueira de Castelo Rodrigo figures in José Saramago's 2008 novel The Elephant's Journey.

== Climate ==
Figueira de Castelo Rodrigo has a Mediterranean climate with cool, wet winters and hot, dry summers. Temperatures can easily surpass 35 °C (95 °F) in the summer and go below 0 °C (32 °F) in the winter. It is one of the coldest towns in Portugal in the winter. It registered a record low temperature of −12.6 °C (9.3 °F) on January 12, 1967, making it the fifth coldest temperature ever recorded in the country and the third coldest since 1960.

Climate data for Figueira de Castelo Rodrigo, 1961-1990, altitude: 635 m (2,083 ft)
Month	Jan	Feb	Mar	Apr	May	Jun	Jul	Aug	Sep	Oct	Nov	Dec	Year
Record high °C (°F)	22.6 (72.7)	24.8 (76.6)	29.4 (84.9)	32.2 (90.0)	34.8 (94.6)	41.5 (106.7)	40.6 (105.1)	44.0 (111.2)	41.4 (106.5)	32.6 (90.7)	25.3 (77.5)	23.2 (73.8)	44.0 (111.2)
Mean daily maximum °C (°F)	8.8 (47.8)	10.9 (51.6)	13.6 (56.5)	15.8 (60.4)	20.2 (68.4)	25.4 (77.7)	29.6 (85.3)	29.3 (84.7)	25.9 (78.6)	19.2 (66.6)	12.8 (55.0)	9.0 (48.2)	18.4 (65.1)
Daily mean °C (°F)	4.5 (40.1)	6.2 (43.2)	8.1 (46.6)	10.2 (50.4)	13.7 (56.7)	18.1 (64.6)	21.3 (70.3)	20.9 (69.6)	18.4 (65.1)	13.2 (55.8)	7.9 (46.2)	4.9 (40.8)	12.3 (54.1)
Mean daily minimum °C (°F)	0.2 (32.4)	1.5 (34.7)	2.6 (36.7)	4.6 (40.3)	7.2 (45.0)	10.8 (51.4)	13.0 (55.4)	12.5 (54.5)	10.9 (51.6)	7.2 (45.0)	3.0 (37.4)	0.8 (33.4)	6.2 (43.2)
Record low °C (°F)	−12.6 (9.3)	−12.0 (10.4)	−9.6 (14.7)	−5.6 (21.9)	−4.1 (24.6)	2.1 (35.8)	4.5 (40.1)	5.5 (41.9)	1.6 (34.9)	−7.6 (18.3)	−8.1 (17.4)	−9.6 (14.7)	−12.6 (9.3)
Average rainfall mm (inches)	67.3 (2.65)	71.5 (2.81)	44.4 (1.75)	54.0 (2.13)	48.6 (1.91)	39.5 (1.56)	21.8 (0.86)	10.7 (0.42)	36.6 (1.44)	61.8 (2.43)	70.2 (2.76)	57.6 (2.27)	584 (22.99)
Average relative humidity (%)	86	83	77	75	70	65	61	62	64	76	83	86	74
Mean monthly sunshine hours	107	132	185	199	261	296	352	330	230	187	135	101	2,515
Source: Instituto de Meteorologia

== Parishes ==
Administratively, the municipality is divided into 10 civil parishes (freguesias):

- Algodres, Vale de Alfonsinho e Vilar de Amargo
- Almofala e Escarigo
- Castelo Rodrigo
- Cinco Vilas e Reigada
- Colmeal e Vilar Torpim
- Escalhão
- Figueira de Castelo Rodrigo
- Freixeda do Torrão, Quintã de Pêro Martins e Penha da Águia
- Mata de Lobos
- Vermiosa

== Notable people ==
- João Pedro (born 1986) a retired professional footballer with over 470 club caps

== See also ==
- Castelo Rodrigo IPR
- Castelo Rodrigo Castle
