= Seia =

- Municipality
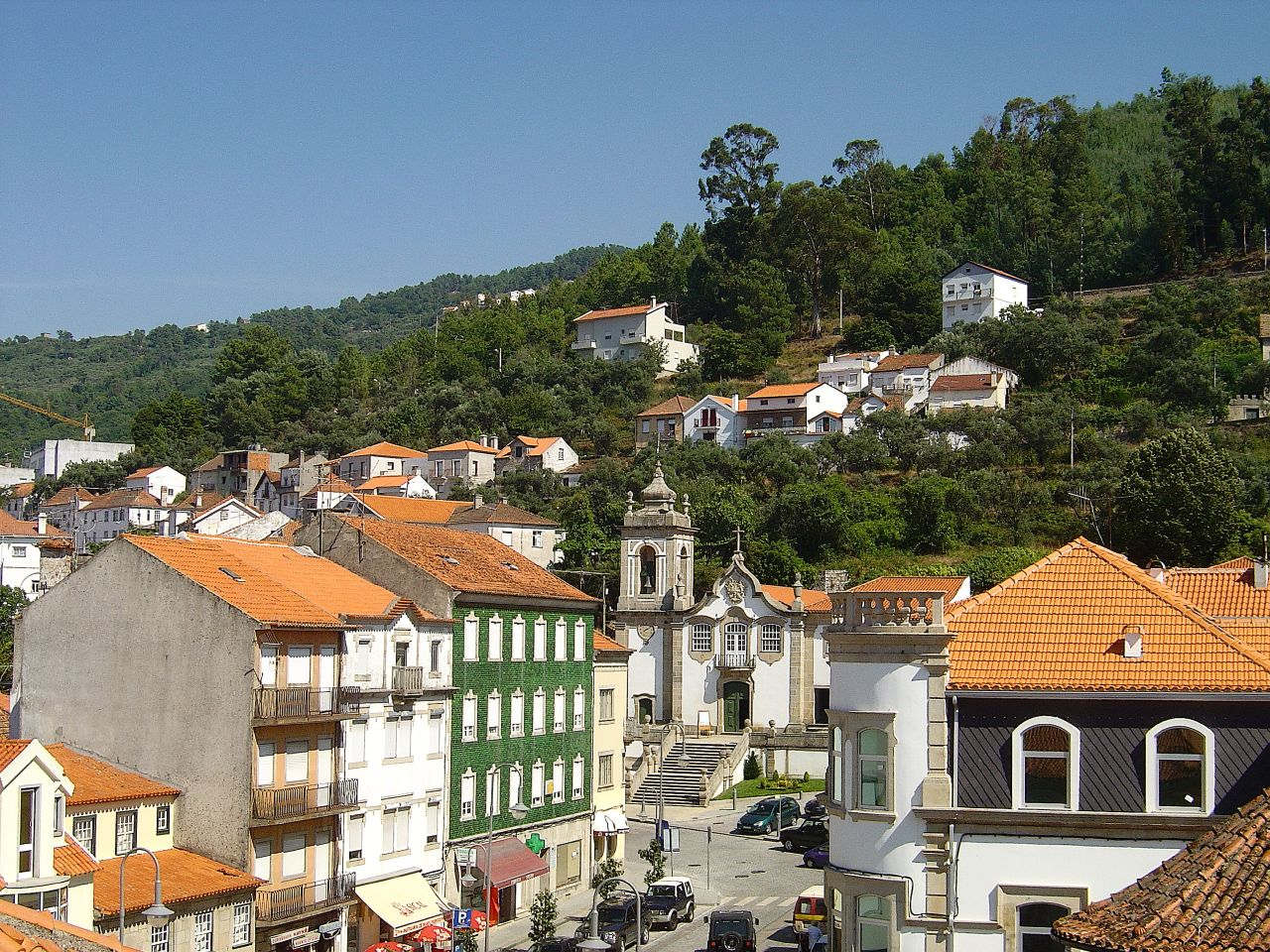
- Urban area of Seia

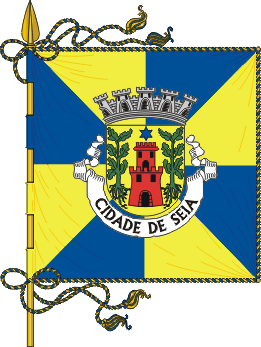
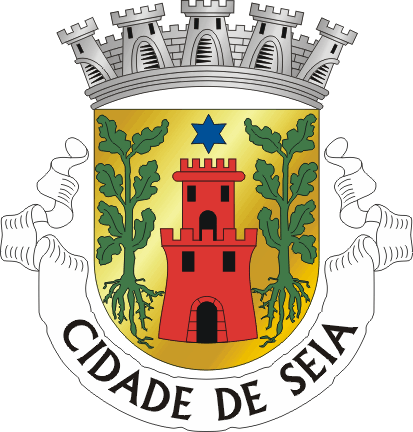
- Flag Coat of arms
- Interactive map of Seia
- Coordinates: 40°25′N 7°42′W
- Country: Portugal
- Region: Centro
- Intermunic. comm.: Beiras e Serra da Estrela
- District: Guarda
- Parishes: 21

Government
  - President: António Luciano Silva Ribeiro (PS)

Area
  - Total: 453.69 km^{2} (175.17 sq mi)

Population (2021)
  - Total: 21,755
  - Density: 47.951/km^{2} (124.19/sq mi)
- Time zone: UTC+00:00 (WET)
  - Summer (DST): UTC+01:00 (WEST)
- Local holiday: July 3
- Website: http://www.cm-seia.pt

Seia (European Portuguese pronunciation: [ˈsɐjɐ]) is a municipality in Guarda District in Portugal. The population in 2021 was 21,755, in an area of 453.69 square kilometres (175.17 mi^{2}). Its urban population is about 7,000. Seia was elevated to city status on 3 July 1986. The municipality is situated on the northwestern slope of Serra da Estrela, the highest mountain range in mainland Portugal, with a top height of 1993 meters. The present Mayor is António Luciano Silva Ribeiro, elected by the Socialist Party. The municipal holiday is July 3. Seia has an annual cinema festival called CineEco that focuses on films with ecological and natural themes.

== Geography ==
The municipality is limited to the north by the municipalities of Nelas and Mangualde, to the northeast by Gouveia, to the east by Manteigas, to the southeast by Covilhã, to the southwest by Arganil and to the west by Oliveira do Hospital. In this municipality is located the highest point in mainland Portugal, Torre, in Serra da Estrela, with 1,993 meters of altitude. The municipality of Seia covers a large part of Serra da Estrela and is also the only one in Portugal where there is a natural ski resort, Vodafone Ski Resort, located within the limits of the parish of Loriga.

Located on the western slope of Serra da Estrela, the city of Seia is at an altitude of 550 m. The climate of the municipality is temperate, with moderate temperatures in summer and cold in winter; with very low temperatures and frequent, sometimes significant snowfalls in the higher altitudes of the Serra da Estrela. As for the rainfall regime, there is a short dry season, which comprises the summer months of July and August.

It is 98 km from Coimbra, 67 km from Guarda, 45 km from Viseu, 298 km from Lisbon and 163 km from Porto. It is mainly served by the Nacional 17 and Nacional 231, which allow a connection to the A25, A24 and IP3.

The Lagoa Comprida dam, built from a natural lagoon, is the main water reservoir in Serra da Estrela. It is the largest of the lakes in the upper massif and its high hydroelectric potential led to the construction of the dam in 1911, being one of the first engineering works of this nature carried out in Portugal.

== History ==
The primitive human presence on where Seia lies today dates back to pre-Roman times, when a settlement was founded by the Turduli, around the 4th century BC, under the name Senna. The Turduli built a castro in the place of Nogueira, between the hills of Santana and Carvalha do Outeiro. Three smaller castros strategically defended it, one in São Romão, another in Crestelo and a third in what is now Seia. There are still remains of castros in Travancinha, Loriga and São Romão.

When the Roman invasion of the Iberian Peninsula took place, the Lusitanians made the mountain range, then called Montes Hermínios, their headquarters, which became a strong hurdle for the invaders. This did not, however, prevent General Galba from massacring 30,000 Lusitanian mountaineers.

When the Romans became lords of the land, they then transformed the Iberian castro of Nogueira into the Roman "Civitas Sena", which was fortified when it became an Ópido with the same name. It was later occupied by the Visigoths and the Moors, the latter from the 8th century onwards.

At the time of the Christian Reconquest of the Iberian Peninsula, the town was definitively conquered from the Moors by Fernando Magno, who rebuilt its fortification. About this episode, the chronicle of monk Silas recounts the violence of the attack and how the Christians forced the occupants of Ópido Sena to flee towards Viseu.

During the time of formation of the Portuguese nationality, Bermudo Peres, Teresa of León's brother-in-law, started a revolt in the castle of Seia. He was unsuccessful, as Afonso I, having learned of this, went to meet him with his forces and expelled him from the castle. In the following year, he donated the domains of Seia and its castle to his servant João Viegas in recognition of services rendered. A few years later, the sovereign granted the first charter to the village in 1136, designating it Civitatem Senam.

Other charters followed, such as the one granted by Afonso II, in December 1217, that of Duarte of Portugal, in December 1433, that of Afonso V, in August 1479, and, finally, that of Manuel I, on 1 June 1510.

It was in Seia that the last republican rally was held before the establishment of the Portuguese Republic in 1910. This rally took place on the 25th of September and was chaired by Afonso Costa, a local of Seia.

== Population ==
Population of Seia Municipality (1801–2021)
1801	1849	1900	1930	1960	1981	1991	2001	2004	2011	2021
9993	14557	31929	31283	34436	31352	30362	28144	27574	24702	21755

== Parishes ==
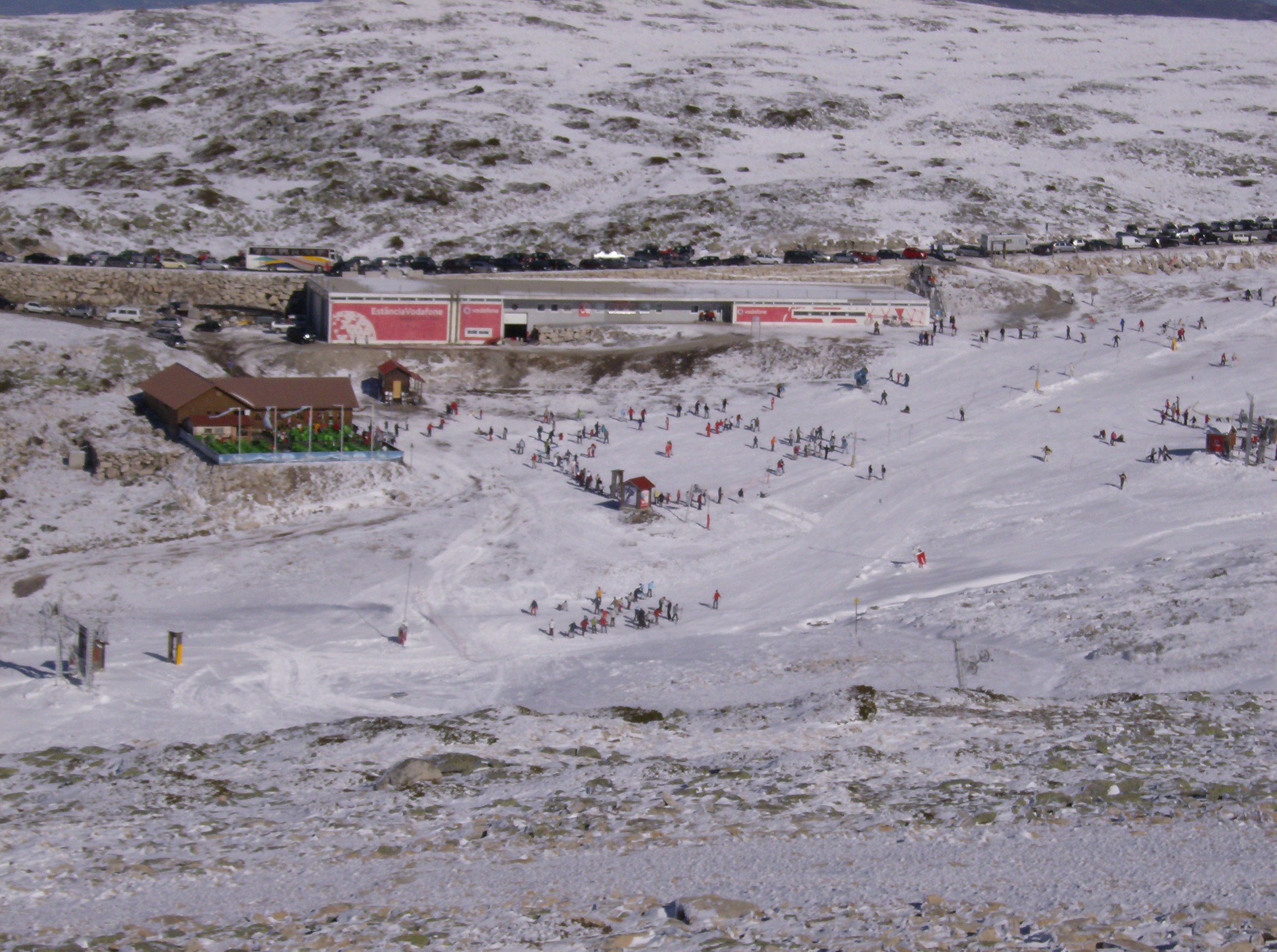
Serra da Estrela Ski Resort, in Loriga.

Administratively, the municipality is divided into 21 civil parishes (freguesias):

- Alvoco da Serra
- Carragozela e Várzea de Meruge
- Girabolhos
- Loriga
- Paranhos
- Pinhanços
- Sabugueiro
- Sameice e Santa Eulália
- Sandomil
- Santa Comba
- Santa Marinha e São Martinho
- Santiago
- Sazes da Beira
- Seia, São Romão e Lapa dos Dinheiros
- Teixeira
- Torrozelo e Folhadosa
- Tourais e Lajes
- Travancinha
- Valezim
- Vide e Cabeça
- Vila Cova à Coelheira

== Notable people ==
- Sebastião Fernandes da Costa (1842 in Santa Marinha – 1889) a lawyer and politician.
- Afonso Augusto da Costa (1871-1937) a lawyer, professor and republican politician.
- Theodorico de Sacadura Botte (1902 in Quinta da Bica - 1987) a colonial administrator and entrepreneur.
- António de Almeida Santos (1926–2016) a lawyer, politician and government minister
- Joaquim Pina Moura (1952 in Loriga – 2020) a Portuguese politician and economist.

=== Sport ===
- Fernando Mendes (born 1937) a footballer and manager with 177 club caps and 21 for Portugal.
- André Lopes (born 1982) a Portuguese volleyball player
- José Bosingwa (born 1982) a former footballer with 334 club caps and 27 with Portugal.
- Cícero Semedo (born 1986) a footballer with over 260 club caps and 14 for Guinea-Bissau
- Alexandre Ferreira (born 1991) a Portuguese volleyball player

== Twin towns – sister cities ==
Seia is twinned with:

- Domfront en Poiraie, France
