= Beiras e Serra da Estrela =

- Intermunicipal community
- Logo

- Coordinates: 40.55°N 7.26°W
- Country: Portugal
- Region: Centro
- Established: 2013
- Seat: Guarda
- Municipalities: 15

Area
  - Total: 6,304.95 km^{2} (2,434.35 sq mi)

Population (2011)
  - Total: 236,023
  - Density: 37.4346/km^{2} (96.9551/sq mi)
- Time zone: UTC+00:00 (WET)
  - Summer (DST): UTC+01:00 (WEST)
- Website: CIMRBSE

The Comunidade Intermunicipal das Beiras e Serra da Estrela (Portuguese pronunciation: [ˈbɐjɾɐz i ˈsɛʁɐ ðɐ ɨʃˈtɾelɐ]) is an administrative division in eastern Portugal. It was created in 2013. Since January 2015, Beiras e Serra da Estrela is also a NUTS3 subregion of Centro Region, that covers the same area as the intermunicipal community. The seat of the intermunicipal community is Guarda. Beiras e Serra da Estrela comprises parts of the former districts of Guarda and Castelo Branco. The population in 2011 was 236,023, in an area of 6,304.95 square kilometres (2,434.35 mi^{2}).

== Municipalities ==
The intermunicipal community of Beiras e Serra da Estrela {CIM} consists of 15 municipalities:

Municipality	Population (2011)	Area (km^{2})
Almeida	7,242	517.98
Belmonte	6,859	118.76
Celorico da Beira	7,693	247.22
Covilhã	51,797	555.60
Figueira de Castelo Rodrigo	6,260	508.57
Fornos de Algodres	4,989	131.45
Fundão	29,213	700.20
Gouveia	14,046	300.61
Guarda	42,541	712.10
Manteigas	3,430	121.98
Mêda	5,202	286.05
Pinhel	9,627	484.52
Sabugal	12,544	822.70
Seia	24,702	435.69
Trancoso	9,878	361.52
Total	236,023	6,304.95

== Cities ==
The following localities are cities (cidades): Covilhã, Fundão, Gouveia, Guarda [seat capital of the CIM], Mêda, Trancoso, Sabugal and Seia.
