= Guarda District =

District of Portugal

Coordinates: 40°32′13″N 7°16′05″W

District of Guarda Distrito de Guarda (Portuguese)
- District
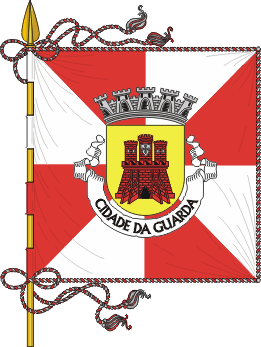
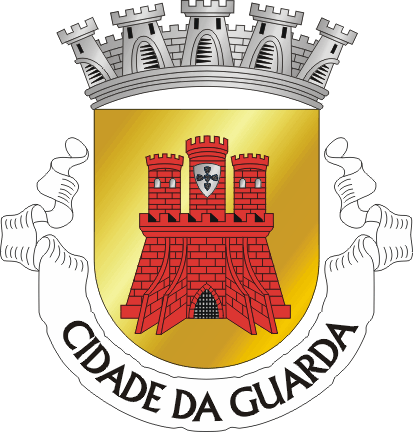
- Flag Coat of arms

- Country: Portugal
- Region: Centro (partly Norte, only Foz Coa)
- Historical province: Beira Alta Province (partly Trás-os-Montes e Alto Douro Province)
- No. of municipalities: 14
- No. of parishes: 245
- Capital: Guarda

Area
  - Total: 5,518 km^{2} (2,131 sq mi)

Population
  - Total: 173,716
  - Density: 31.48/km^{2} (81.54/sq mi)
- ISO 3166 code: PT-09
- No. of parliamentary representatives: 3

The District of Guarda (Portuguese: Distrito de Guarda [ˈɡwaɾðɐ]) is located in the Centro Region of Portugal, except Vila Nova de Foz Côa, which is in the Norte Region. The district capital and most populous city is Guarda. It borders Castile and León, Spain.

== Municipalities ==
The district contains 14 municipalities:

- Aguiar da Beira
- Almeida
- Celorico da Beira
- Figueira de Castelo Rodrigo
- Fornos de Algodres
- Gouveia
- Guarda
- Manteigas
- Mêda
- Pinhel
- Sabugal
- Seia
- Trancoso
- Vila Nova de Foz Côa

== Cities ==
The following seat of municipalities have city (cidade)status: Gouveia, Guarda, Meda, Pinhel, Sabugal, Trancoso.

== Subregions Included within the District of Guarda ==
Beira Interior Norte, Serra da Estrela, Douro and Dão-Lafões.

== Geography ==
The main mountain ranges are the Serra da Estrela and Serra da Marofa. The main rivers are the Mondego, Côa, and Douro.

== Main Monuments/Castles ==
- Guarda Sé/ Cathedral of Guarda.
- Castles:(Castelos de) Pinhel, Sabugal, Sortelha, Marialva, Celorico, Rodrigo, Almeida, Trancoso.
- Pelourinhos de Pinhel and Alverca da Beira.

== Summary of votes and seats won 1976-2022 ==
Summary of election results from Guarda district, 1976-2022
Parties	%	S	%	S	%	S	%	S	%	S	%	S	%	S	%	S	%	S	%	S	%	S	%	S	%	S	%	S	%	S	%	S
Parties	1976		1979		1980		1983		1985		1987		1991		1995		1999		2002		2005		2009		2011		2015		2019		2022	
PS	25.2	2	26.3	1	26.3	1	33.5	2	23.3	2	21.8	1	26.8	1	43.7	2	43.4	2	34.7	2	46.8	2	36.0	2	28.3	1	33.8	2	37.6	2	45.1	2
PSD	25.7	2	In AD				31.5	2	33.6	2	60.0	4	58.6	3	39.9	2	39.2	2	48.5	2	34.7	2	35.6	2	46.3	3	In PàF		34.3	1	33.5	1
CDS-PP	32.1	2	In AD				23.8	1	19.5	1	6.6		5.9		9.9		9.8		9.6		7.0		11.2		11.2		In PàF		5.0		2.2	
AD			60.6	4	60.6	4																										
PàF																											45.6	2				
Total seats	6		5										4																3			
Source: Comissão Nacional de Eleições

== See also ==
- Barregão, a village located in the district of Guarda
