= Outline of Portugal =

Country in the Iberian Peninsula in Southern Europe

The Flag of Portugal

The Coat of arms of Portugal

The location of Portugal

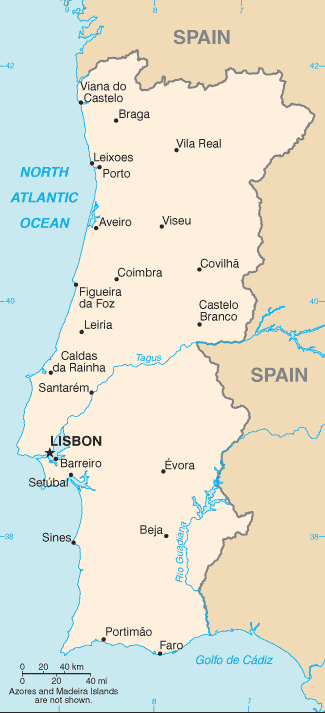
An enlargeable basic map of Continental Portugal.

The following outline is provided as an overview of and topical guide to Portugal:

Portugal is a sovereign country principally located on the Iberian Peninsula in Southern Europe. It is the westernmost country of continental Europe and is bordered by the Atlantic Ocean to the west and south and by Spain to the north and east. The Atlantic archipelagos of the Azores and Madeira (including the Savage Islands) are also part of Portugal.

The land within the borders of today's Portuguese Republic has been continuously settled since prehistoric times. Some of the earliest civilizations include Lusitanians and Celtic societies. Incorporation into the Roman Republic dominions took place in the 2nd century BC. The region was ruled and colonized by Germanic peoples, such as the Suebi and the Visigoths, from the 5th to the 8th century. From this era, some vestiges of the Alans were also found. The Muslim Moors arrived in the early 8th century and conquered the Christian Germanic kingdoms, eventually occupying most of the Iberian Peninsula. In the early 12th century, during the Christian Reconquista, Portugal appeared as a kingdom independent of its neighbour, the Kingdom of León and Galicia. In a little over a century, in 1249, Portugal would establish almost its entire modern-day borders.

During the 15th and 16th centuries, with a global empire that included possessions in Africa, Asia and South America, Portugal was one of the world's major economic, political, and cultural powers. In the 17th century, the Portuguese Restoration War between Portugal and Spain ended the sixty-year period of the Iberian Union (1580–1640). In the 19th century, armed conflict with French and Spanish invading forces and the loss of its largest territorial possession abroad, Brazil, disrupted political stability and potential economic growth. In 1910, the last Portuguese king was overthrown and a republic was proclaimed. In 1926, a coup d'état established a military dictatorship that would be replaced by a fascist regime called Estado Novo in 1933. After the Portuguese Colonial War (1961–1974) and the Carnation Revolution coup d'état in 1974, the ruling regime was deposed in Lisbon, a democracy was established and the country handed over its last overseas provinces in Africa. Portugal was accepted as a member of the European Economic Community in 1986. Portugal's last overseas territory, Macau, was handed over to China in 1999.

== General reference ==
- Pronunciation: UK: /ˈpɔːrtjʊɡəl/, US: /ˈpɔːrtʃəɡəl/, Portuguese: [puɾtuˈɣal]
- Common English country name: Portugal
- Official English country name: (The) Portuguese Republic
- Common endonym(s): Portugal
- Official endonym(s): República Portuguesa
- Adjectival(s): Portuguese
- Demonym(s): Portuguese
- Etymology: Name of Portugal
- International rankings of Portugal
- ISO country codes: PT, PRT, 620
- ISO region codes: See ISO 3166-2:PT
- Internet country code top-level domain: .pt

== Geography of Portugal ==
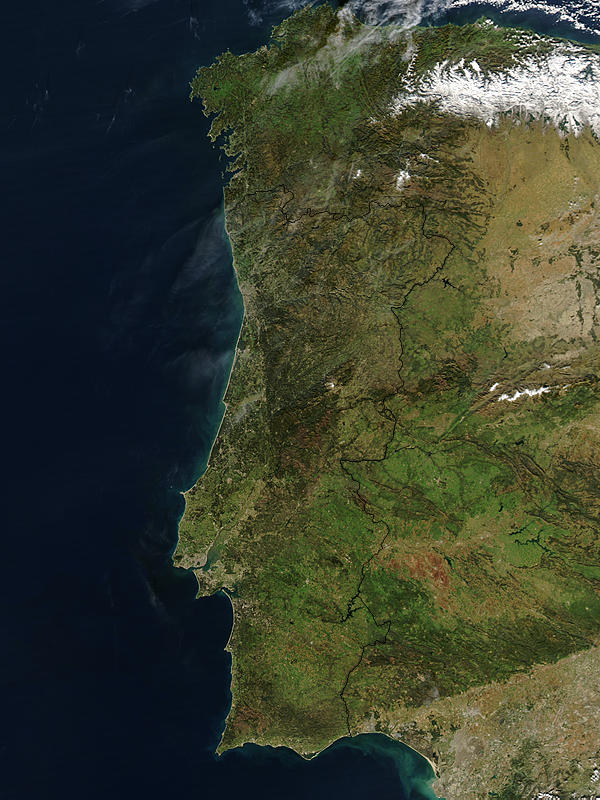
An enlargeable satellite image of Continental Portugal

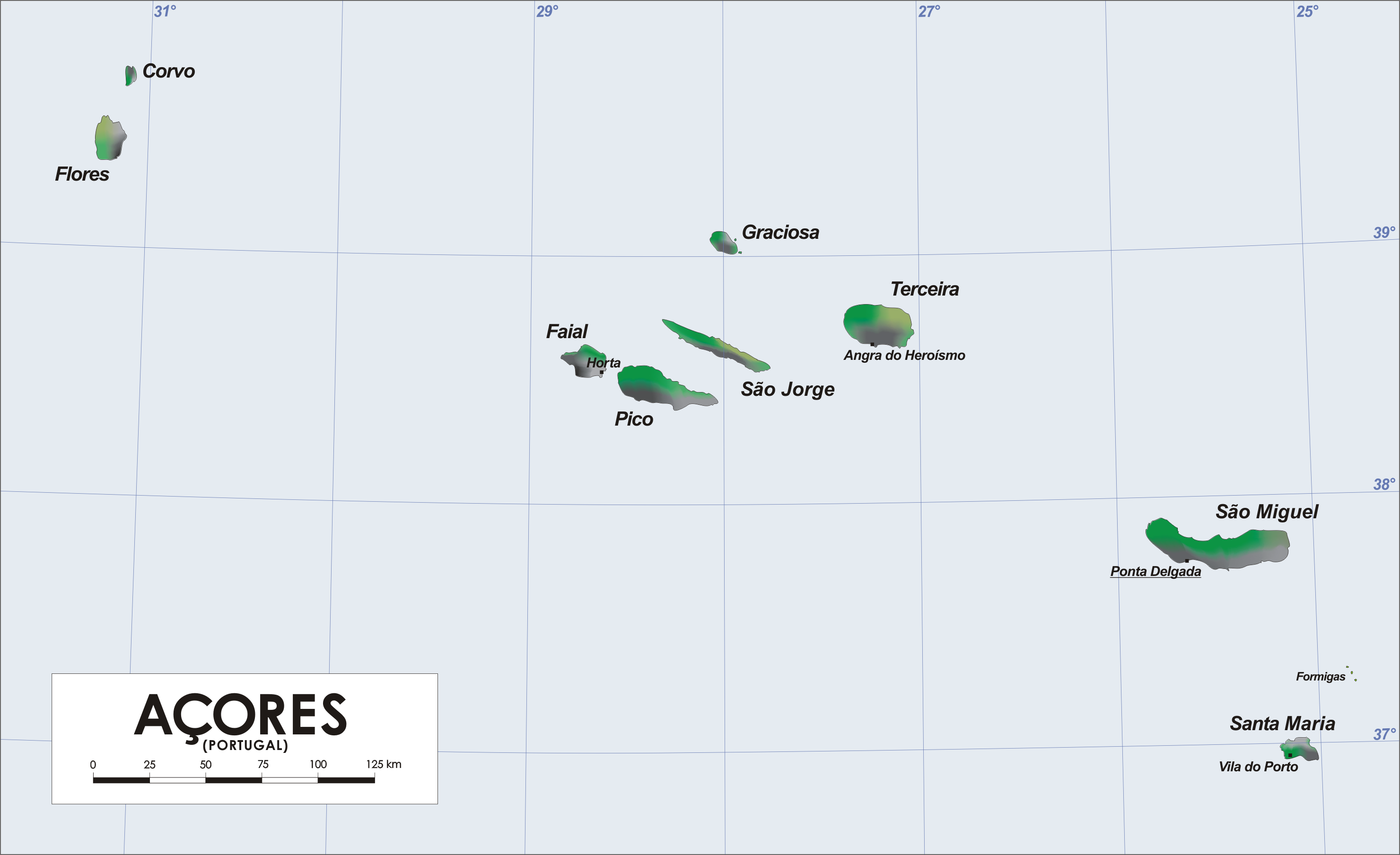
The Azores archipelago (including the islands of Flores, Corvo, Terceira, Graciosa, São Jorge, Pico, Faial, Santa Maria and São Miguel).

The Madeira archipelago (including Madeira, Porto Santo and the Desertas).

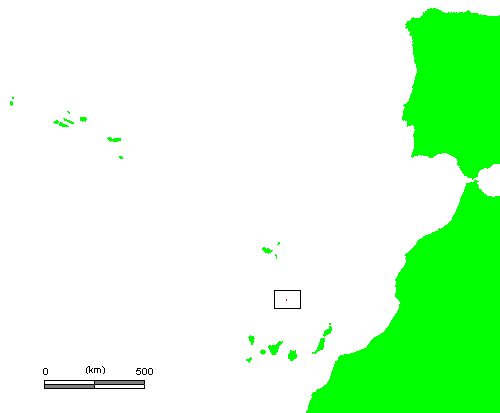
Location of the Savage islands.

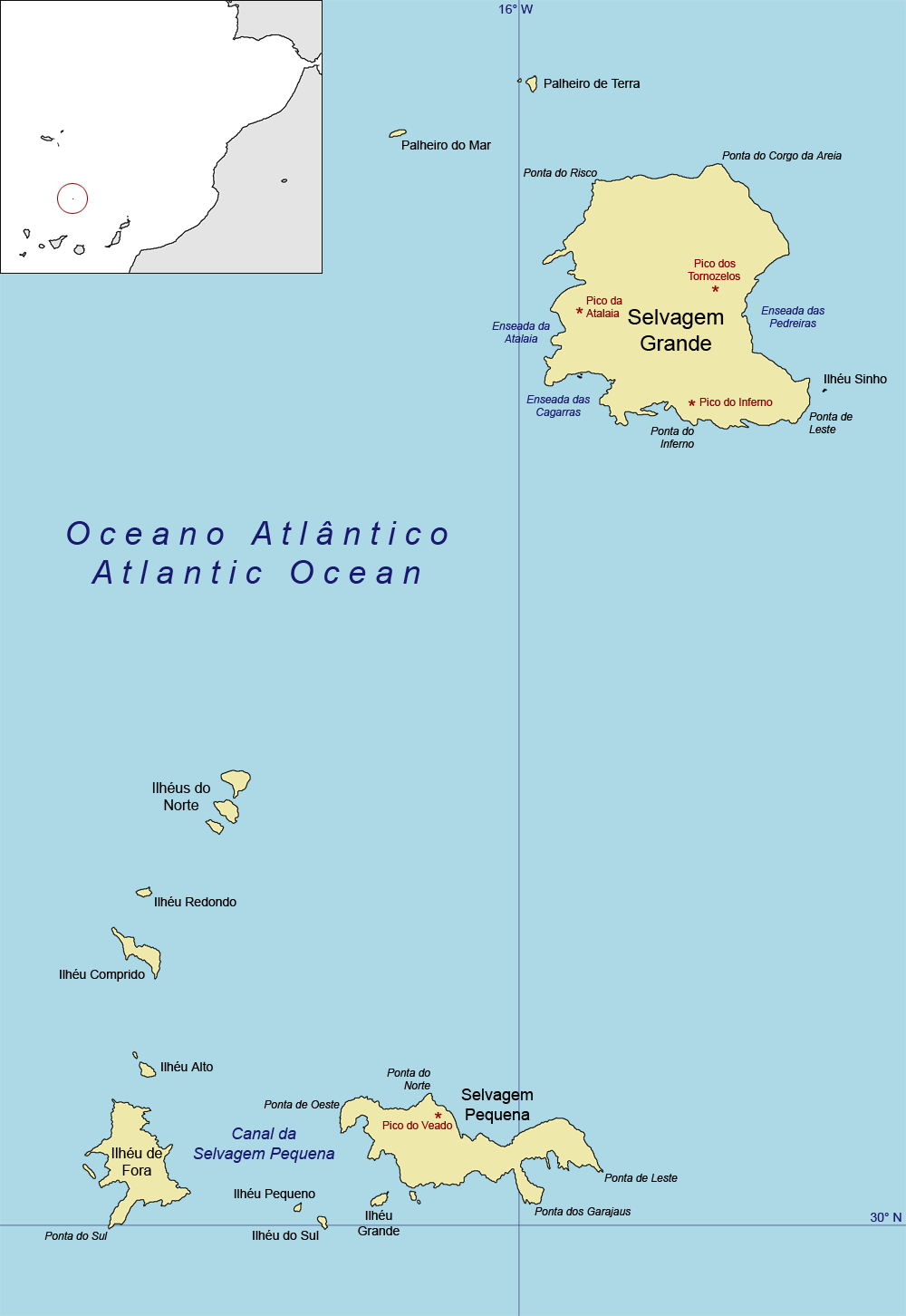
Map of the Savage islands

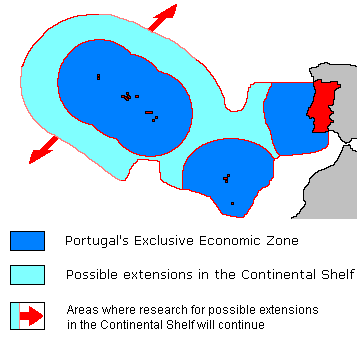
Portugal's Exclusive Economic Zone.

Geography of Portugal

- Portugal is a:
  - Country
    - Developed country
  - Nation state
    - Sovereign state
    - Member State of the European Union
    - Member state of NATO
- Location:
  - Northern and Western Hemisphere
  - Eurasia
    - Europe
      - Western and Southern Europe
        - Iberian Peninsula
  - Time zones:
    - Azores – UTC-01, summer UTC+00
    - Rest of Portugal – Western European Time (UTC+00), Western European Summer Time (UTC+01)
  - Extreme points of Portugal
    - High: Ponta do Pico on Pico Island 2,351 m (7,713 ft) - highest point in the Azores
      Torre 1,993 m (6,539 ft) - highest point in continental Portugal
    - Low: North Atlantic Ocean 0 m
  - Land boundaries: Spain 1,214 km
  - Coastline: North Atlantic Ocean 1,793 km
- Population of Portugal: 10,749,635 (December 31, 2024) - 87th most populous country
- Area of Portugal: 92,345 km^{2}
- Atlas of Portugal
- Islands of Portugal

=== Environment of Portugal ===
- Climate of Portugal
- Ecoregions in Portugal
- Renewable energy in Portugal
- Geology of Portugal
- Protected areas of Portugal
  - Biosphere reserves in Portugal
  - National parks of Portugal
- Wildlife of Portugal
  - Fauna of Portugal
    - Birds of Portugal
    - Mammals of Portugal

==== Natural geographic features of Portugal ====
- Glaciers of Portugal
- Islands of Portugal
- Lakes of Portugal
- Mountains of Portugal
  - Volcanoes in Portugal
- Rivers of Portugal
  - Waterfalls of Portugal
- Valleys of Portugal
- World Heritage Sites in Portugal

=== Regions of Portugal ===
Regions of Portugal

==== Ecoregions of Portugal ====
List of ecoregions in Portugal

- Ecoregions in Portugal

==== Administrative divisions of Portugal ====
Administrative divisions of Portugal

- Autonomous regions of Portugal
- Districts of Portugal
  - Municipalities of Portugal
    - Parishes of Portugal

Autonomous regions of Portugal

- Azores
- Madeira
- Capital of Portugal: Lisbon
- Cities of Portugal
- Towns of Portugal

=== Demography of Portugal ===
Demographics of Portugal

Portuguese people

== Government and politics of Portugal ==
- Politics of Portugal
- Form of government: unitary semi-presidential representative democratic republic
- Capital of Portugal: Lisbon
- Elections in Portugal
- Political parties in Portugal

=== Branches of the government of Portugal ===
- Government of Portugal

==== Executive branch of the government of Portugal ====
- Head of state: President of Portugal, Marcelo Rebelo de Sousa
- Head of government: Prime Minister of Portugal, Luís Montenegro
- Cabinet of Portugal

==== Legislative branch of the government of Portugal ====
- Parliament of Portugal: Assembly of the Republic (unicameral)

==== Judicial branch of the government of Portugal ====
- Court system of Portugal
- Supreme Court of Portugal

=== Foreign relations of Portugal ===
- Foreign relations of Portugal
- Diplomatic missions in Portugal
- Diplomatic missions of Portugal

==== International organization membership ====
The Portuguese Republic is a member of:

- African Development Bank Group (AfDB) (nonregional member)
- Asian Development Bank (ADB) (nonregional member)
- Australia Group
- Bank for International Settlements (BIS)
- Community of Portuguese Language Countries (CPLP)
- Confederation of European Paper Industries (CEPI)
- Council of Europe (CE)
- Economic and Monetary Union (EMU)
- Euro-Atlantic Partnership Council (EAPC)
- European Bank for Reconstruction and Development (EBRD)
- European Investment Bank (EIB)
- European Organization for Nuclear Research (CERN)
- European Space Agency (ESA)
- European Union (EU)
- Food and Agriculture Organization (FAO)
- Inter-American Development Bank (IADB)
- International Atomic Energy Agency (IAEA)
- International Bank for Reconstruction and Development (IBRD)
- International Chamber of Commerce (ICC)
- International Civil Aviation Organization (ICAO)
- International Criminal Court (ICCt)
- International Criminal Police Organization (Interpol)
- International Development Association (IDA)
- International Energy Agency (IEA)
- International Federation of Red Cross and Red Crescent Societies (IFRCS)
- International Finance Corporation (IFC)
- International Fund for Agricultural Development (IFAD)
- International Hydrographic Organization (IHO)
- International Labour Organization (ILO)
- International Maritime Organization (IMO)
- International Mobile Satellite Organization (IMSO)
- International Monetary Fund (IMF)
- International Olympic Committee (IOC)
- International Organization for Migration (IOM)
- International Organization for Standardization (ISO)
- International Red Cross and Red Crescent Movement (ICRM)
- International Telecommunication Union (ITU)
- International Telecommunications Satellite Organization (ITSO)
- International Trade Union Confederation (ITUC)
- Inter-Parliamentary Union (IPU)
- Latin American Integration Association (LAIA) (observer)
- Multilateral Investment Guarantee Agency (MIGA)
- Nonaligned Movement (NAM) (guest)
- North Atlantic Treaty Organization (NATO)
- Nuclear Energy Agency (NEA)
- Nuclear Suppliers Group (NSG)
- Organisation for Economic Co-operation and Development (OECD)
- Organization for Security and Co-operation in Europe (OSCE)
- Organisation for the Prohibition of Chemical Weapons (OPCW)
- Organization of American States (OAS) (observer)
- Permanent Court of Arbitration (PCA)
- Schengen Convention
- Southeast European Cooperative Initiative (SECI) (observer)
- União Latina
- United Nations (UN)
- United Nations Conference on Trade and Development (UNCTAD)
- United Nations Educational, Scientific, and Cultural Organization (UNESCO)
- United Nations High Commissioner for Refugees (UNHCR)
- United Nations Industrial Development Organization (UNIDO)
- United Nations Integrated Mission in Timor-Leste (UNMIT)
- United Nations Interim Force in Lebanon (UNIFIL)
- United Nations Mission in the Central African Republic and Chad (MINURCAT)
- Universal Postal Union (UPU)
- Western European Union (WEU)
- World Confederation of Labour (WCL)
- World Customs Organization (WCO)
- World Federation of Trade Unions (WFTU)
- World Health Organization (WHO)
- World Intellectual Property Organization (WIPO)
- World Meteorological Organization (WMO)
- World Tourism Organization (UNWTO)
- World Trade Organization (WTO)
- Zangger Committee (ZC)

=== Law and order in Portugal ===
- Law of Portugal
- Cannabis in Portugal
- Capital punishment in Portugal
- Constitution of Portugal
- Crime in Portugal
- Human rights in Portugal
  - LGBT rights in Portugal
  - Freedom of religion in Portugal
- Law enforcement in Portugal

=== Military of Portugal ===
- Military of Portugal
- Command
  - Commander-in-chief:
    - Ministry of Defence of Portugal
- Forces
  - Army of Portugal
  - Navy of Portugal
  - Air Force of Portugal
  - Special forces of Portugal
- Military history of Portugal
- Military ranks of Portugal

=== Local government in Portugal ===
- Local government in Portugal

== History of Portugal ==
History of Portugal

- Timeline of the history of Portugal
- Current events of Portugal
- Economic history of Portugal
- Military history of Portugal
- Historiography of Portugal

== Culture of Portugal ==
Culture of Portugal

- Architecture of Portugal
  - Baroque architecture in Portugal
  - Portuguese colonial architecture
  - Portuguese Gothic architecture
  - Portuguese Romanesque architecture
  - Rococo architecture in Portugal
- Cuisine of Portugal
- Festivals in Portugal
- Languages of Portugal
  - Portuguese language
  - Mirandese language
- Media in Portugal
- Museums in Portugal
- National symbols of Portugal
  - Coat of arms of Portugal
  - Flag of Portugal
  - National anthem of Portugal
- People of Portugal
- Prostitution in Portugal
- Public holidays in Portugal
- Records of Portugal
- Religion in Portugal
  - Christianity in Portugal
    - Roman Catholicism in Portugal
    - Protestantism in Portugal
  - Hinduism in Portugal
  - Islam in Portugal
  - Judaism in Portugal
- World Heritage Sites in Portugal

=== Art in Portugal ===
- Art in Portugal
- Cinema of Portugal
- Literature of Portugal
- Music of Portugal
- Television in Portugal
- Theatre in Portugal

=== Sports in Portugal ===
Sports in Portugal

- Football in Portugal
- Portugal at the Olympics

== Economy and infrastructure of Portugal ==
Economy of Portugal

- Economic rank, by nominal GDP (2026): 44th (forty-fourth)
- Agriculture in Portugal
- Banking in Portugal
  - National Bank of Portugal
- Communications in Portugal
  - Internet in Portugal
- Companies of Portugal
- Currency of Portugal: Euro (see also: Euro topics)
  - ISO 4217: EUR
- Economic history of Portugal
- Energy in Portugal
  - Energy policy of Portugal
  - Oil industry in Portugal
- Health care in Portugal
- Mining in Portugal
- Portugal Stock Exchange
- Tourism in Portugal
- Transport in Portugal
  - Airports in Portugal
  - Rail transport in Portugal
  - Roads in Portugal
- Water supply and sanitation in Portugal

== Education in Portugal ==
Education in Portugal

- List of higher education institutions in Portugal
- List of schools in Portugal
- List of universities and colleges in Portugal

== Health in Portugal ==
Health in Portugal

== See also ==
Portugal

- List of international rankings
- List of Portugal-related topics
- Member state of the European Union
- Member state of the North Atlantic Treaty Organization
- Member state of the United Nations
- Outline of Europe
- Outline of geography
