= List of lakes of Portugal =

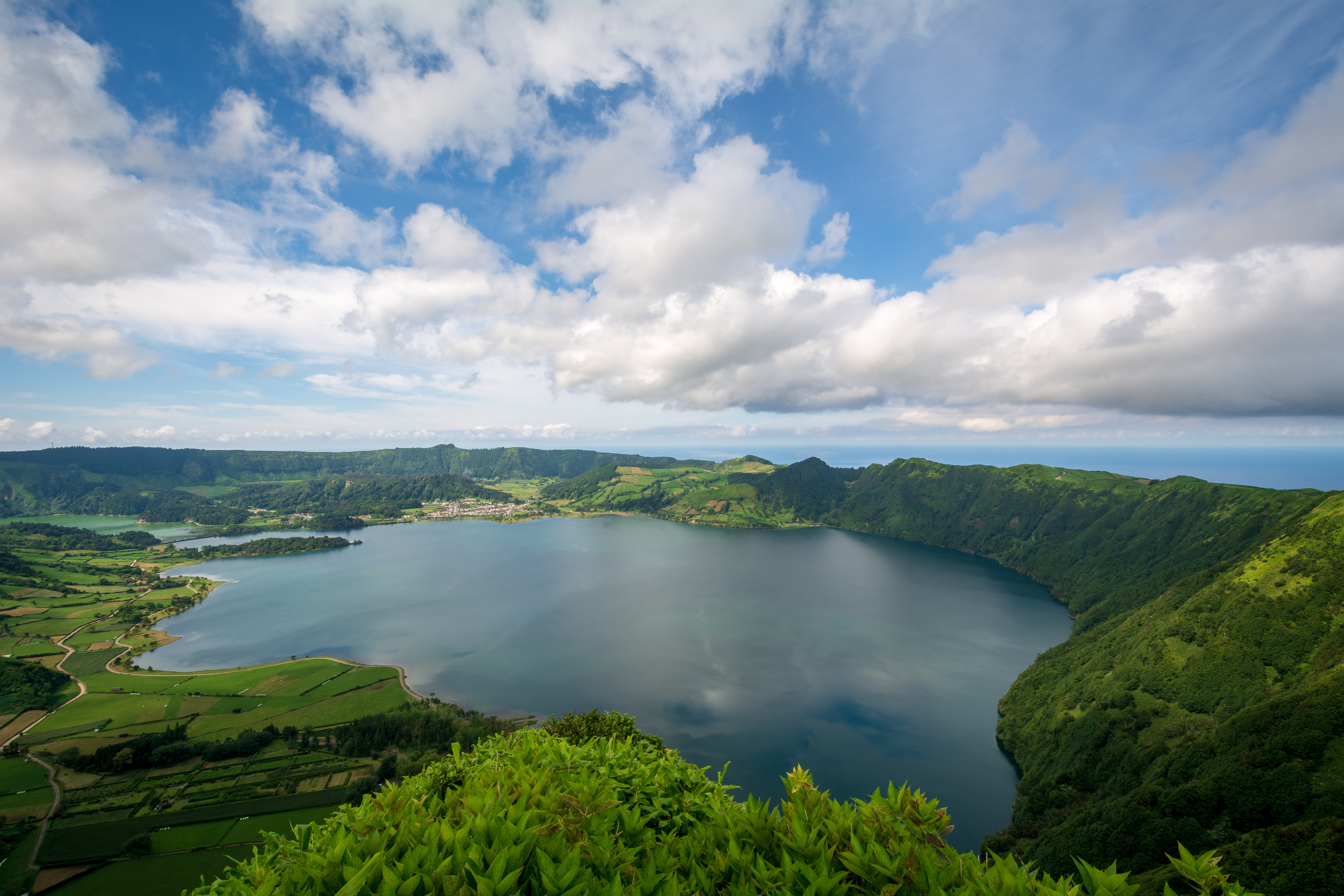
Lagoa das Sete Cidades, São Miguel Island, Azores

Although some lakes occur in mainland Portugal, most of these bodies of water are native to the archipelago of the Azores. A large part of the lakes present in mainland Portugal are artificial and the result of damming. Most natural lakes in the mainland can be found in Serra da Estrela. Madeira has small bodies of water (ponds), an thus does not meet the criteria for inclusion in this list.

The word lake can be directly translated into the Portuguese language word lago, but these bodies of water are most commonly classified as lagoas (singular: lagoa), which is semi-equivalent to the word pond and is not to be confused with a lagoon (lagoons are bodies of water close or connected to an ocean whereas lakes or ponds are surrounded entirely by land).

== Azores ==
=== Corvo Island ===
- Lagoa do Caldeirão

=== Flores Island ===
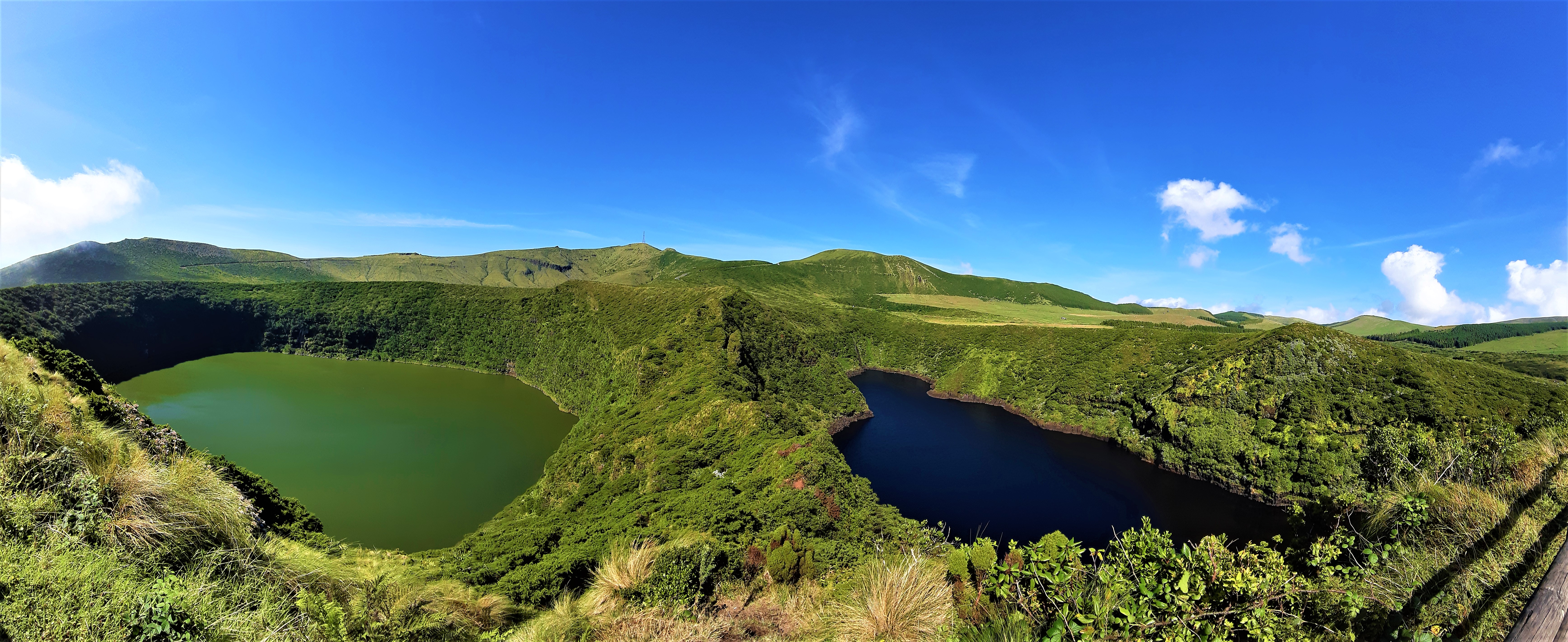
Lagoa Funda & Rasa

- Lagoa Fundy
- Lagoa Funda das Lajes
- Lagoa Branca
- Lagoa Comprida
- Lagoa Negra
- Lagoa Seca
- Lagoa da Lomba
- Lagoa Rasa

=== Faial Island ===
- Lagoa da Caldeira
- Lagoa das Patas

=== Pico Island ===
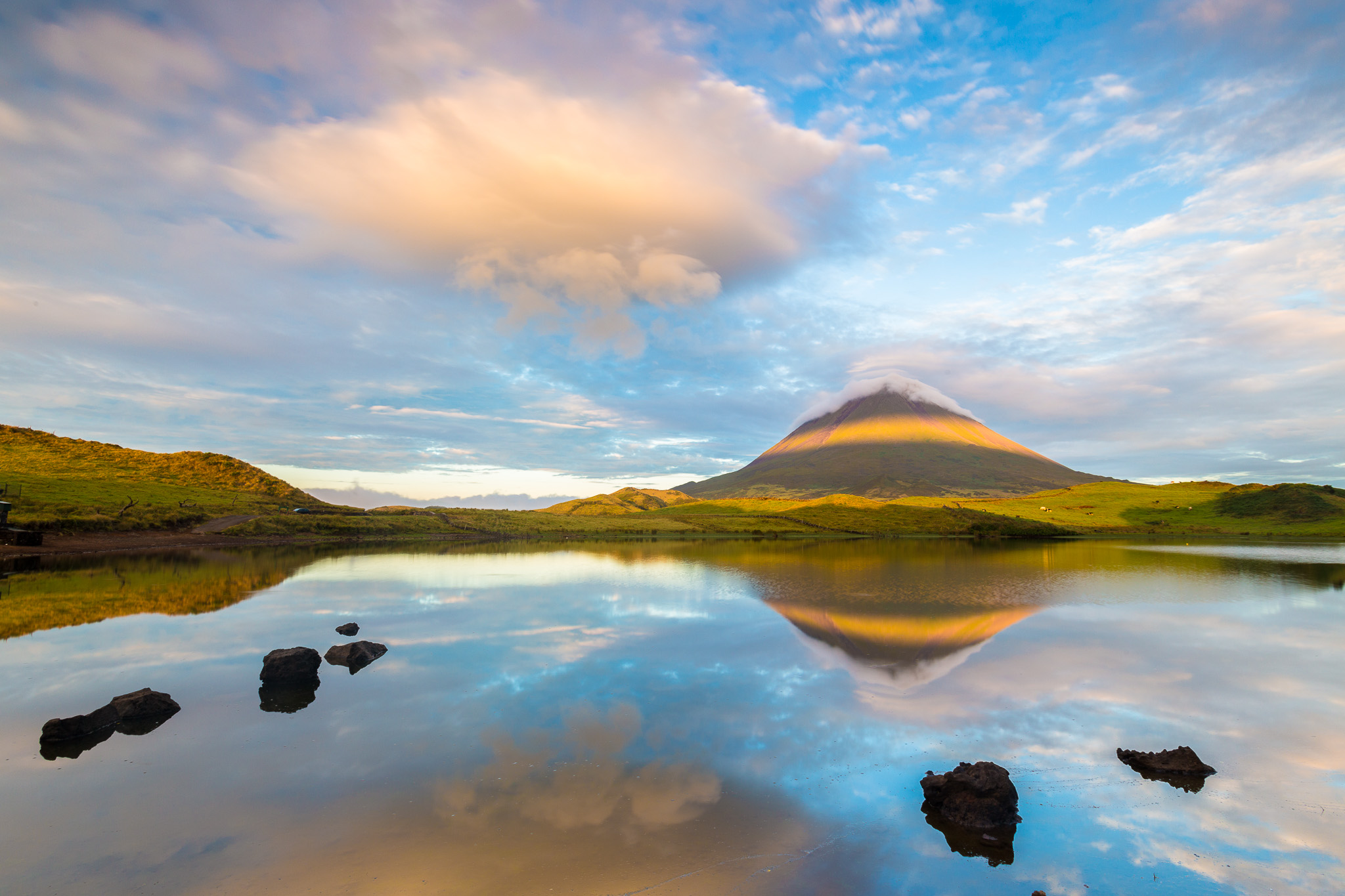
Lagoa do Capitão

- Lagoa da Prainha
- Lagoa do Capitão
- Lagoa do Paul
- Lagoa Corre Água
- Lagoa do Landroal
- Lagoa do Caiado
- Lagoa Seca
- Lagoa dos Grotões
- Lagoa da Rosada
- Lagoa Negra
- Lagoa do Peixinho
- Lagoa do Ilhéu
- Lagoa do Paúl
- Lagoa da Barreira

=== Graciosa ===
- Lagoa da Vila

=== Terceira Island ===
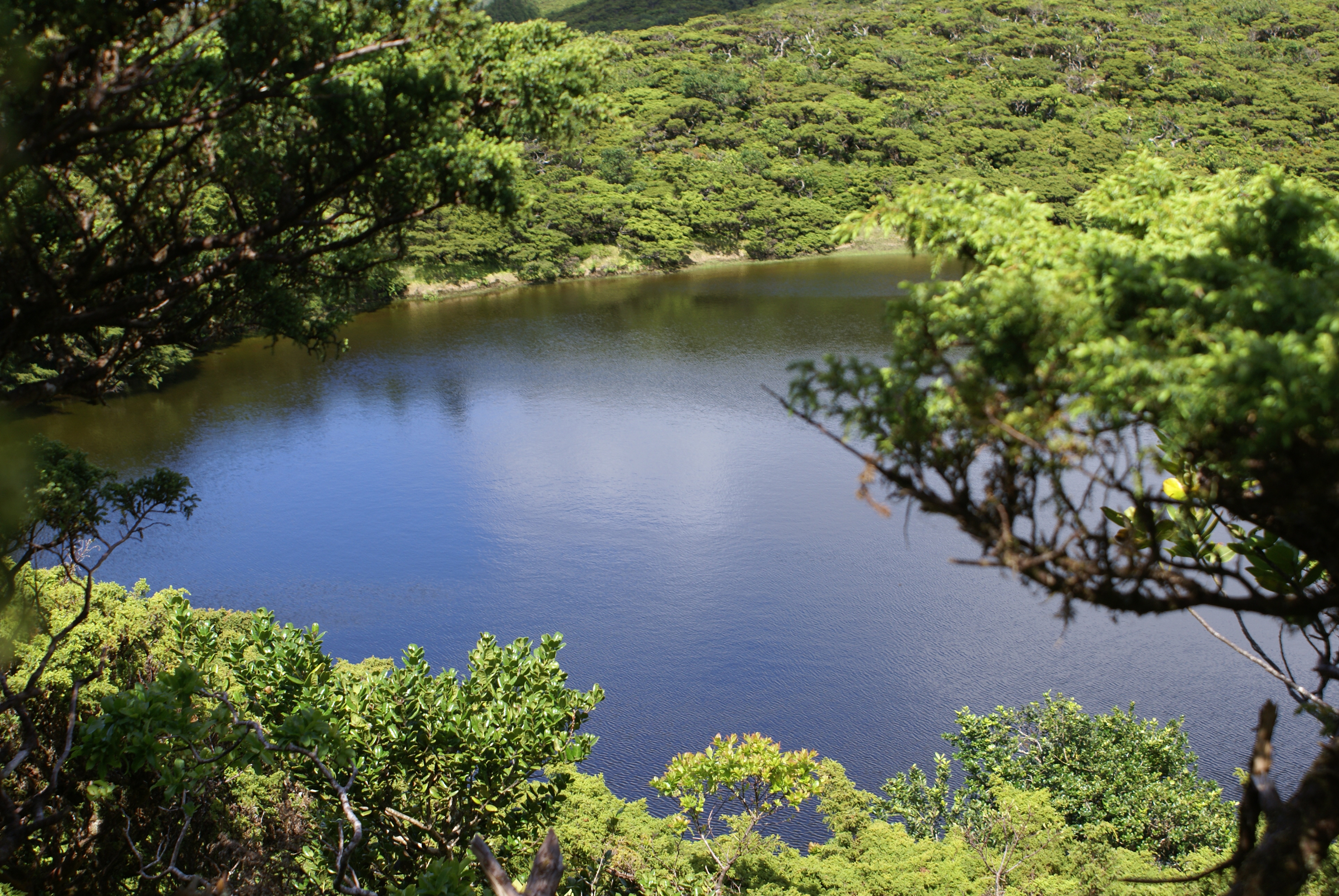
Chã das Lagoinhas

- Lagoa Negra
- Lagoa do Negro
- Chã das Lagoinhas
- Lagoa das Patas (ou lagoa da Falca)
- Lagoa do Ginjal
- Lagoinha
- Lagoa Funda
- Lagoa do Pico do Alpanaque
- Lagoa do Pico do Areeiro
- Lagoa do Escampadouro
- Lagoa do Junco
- Lagoa do Labaçal

=== São Miguel Island ===
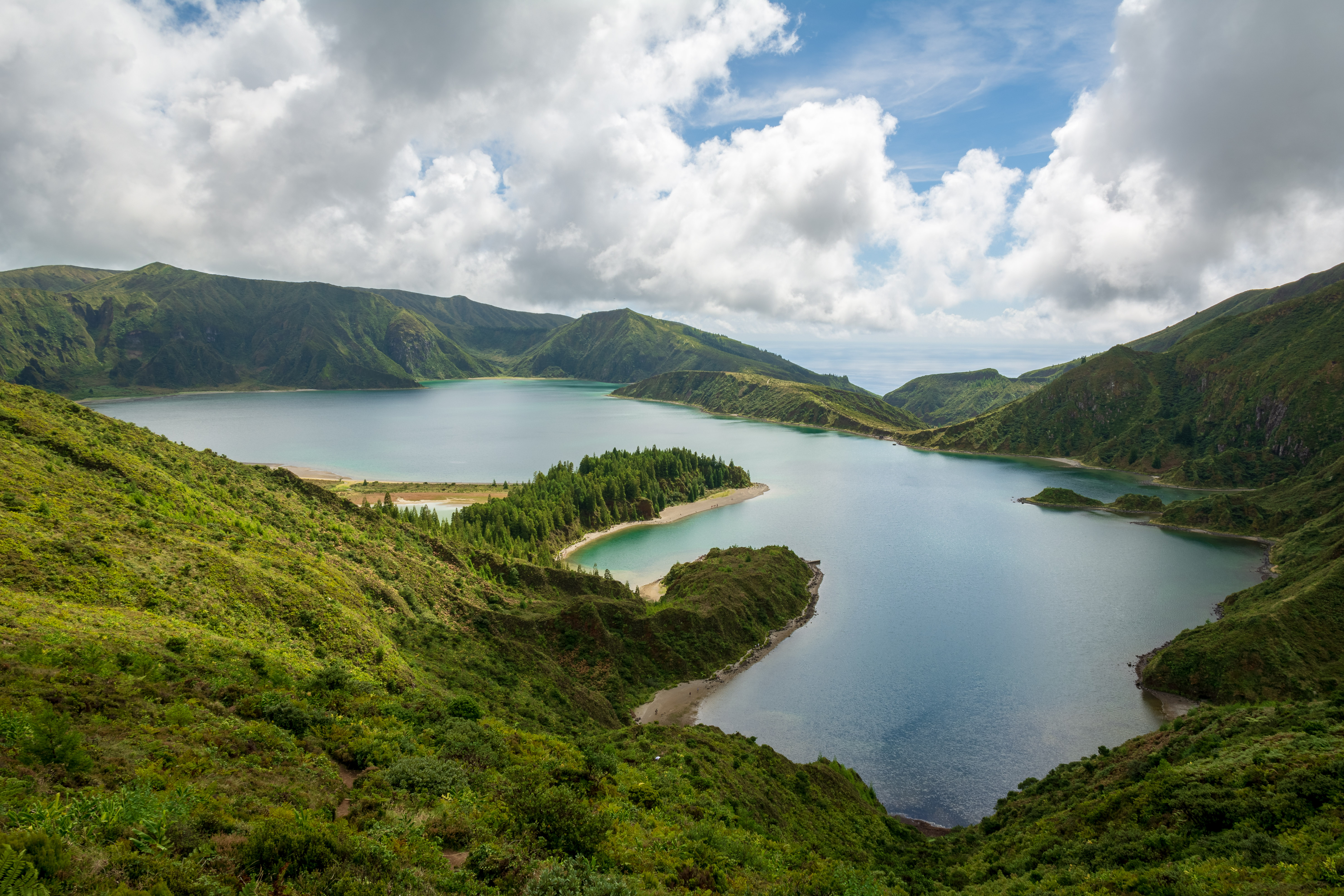
Lagoa do Fogo

- Lagoa da caldeira das Sete Cidades
- Lagoa de Santiago
- Lagoa Rasa
- Lagoa do Fogo
- Lagoa do Ilhéu de Vila Franca do Campo
- Lagoa das Furnas
- Lagoa das Éguas
- Lagoa do Congro
- Lagoa do Canário
- Lagoa Empadadas
- Lagoa de Pau Pique
- Lagoa do Carvão
- Lagoa de São Brás
- Lagoa do Areeiro
- Lagoa dos Nenúfares
- Lagoa do Peixe
- Lagoa do Charco da Madeira
- Lagoa das Canas
- Lagoa da Prata
- Lagoa das Achadas
- Lagoa do Caldeirão Grande
- Lagoa do Caldeirão Norte
- Lagoa do Junco

=== São Jorge Island ===
- Lagoa da Fajã de Santo Cristo
- Lagoa da Fajã dos Cubres
- Lagoa do Pico do Bernardino
- Lagoa do Pico Alto
- Lagoa do Pico da Esperança
- Lagoa do Pico Pinheiro

== Mainland ==
=== Alentejo ===
- Barragem de Alqueva

=== Serra da Estrela ===
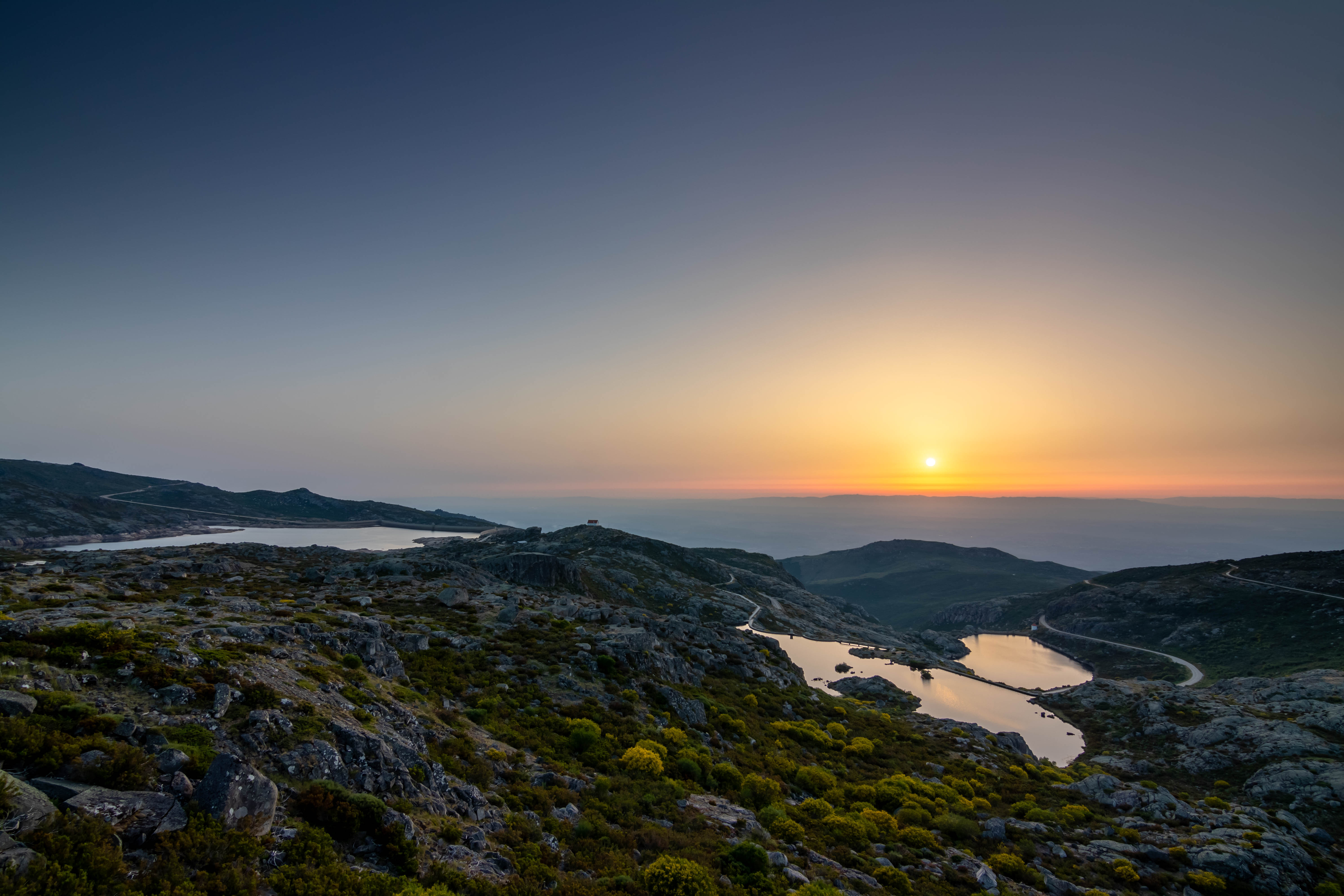
Small lakes in Serra da Estrela

- Lagoa dos Cântaros
- Lagoa Comprida
- Covão dos Conchos
- Lagoa do Covão do Quelhas
- Lagoa da Francelha
- Covão do Meio
- Lagoa do Peixão
- Lagoa Serrano
- Lago do Viriato

=== Peneda-Gerês ===
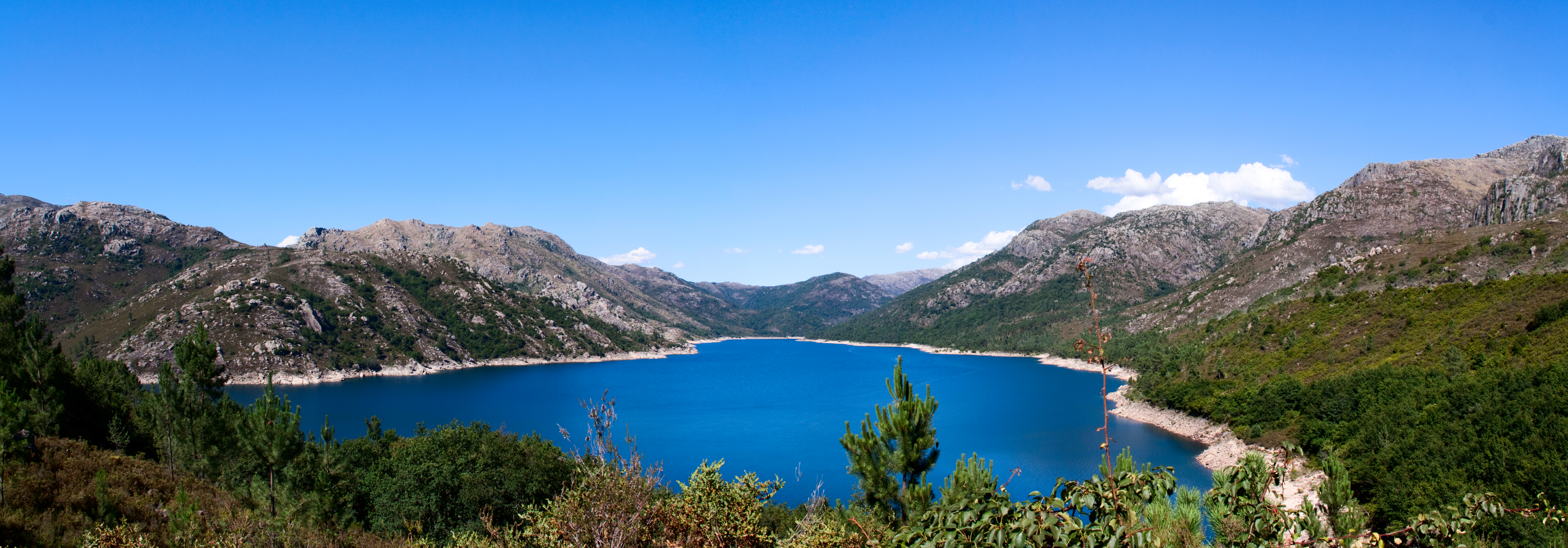
Vilarinho das Furnas Dam

- Vilarinho das Furnas Dam
