= Mação (parish) =

- Civil parish
- Location in Portugal
- Coordinates: 39°33′12″N 7°59′55″W
- Country: Portugal
- Region: Oeste e Vale do Tejo
- Intermunic. comm.: Médio Tejo
- District: Santarém
- Municipality: Mação
- Disbanded: 28 January 2013

Area
  - Total: 67.27 km^{2} (25.97 sq mi)

Population (2011)
  - Total: 2,228
  - Density: 33/km^{2} (86/sq mi)
- Time zone: UTC+00:00 (WET)
  - Summer (DST): UTC+01:00 (WEST)

Mação is a former parish in the municipality of Mação, Portugal. The population in 2011 was 2,228, in an area of 67.27 km^{2}. In 2013, the parish merged with Penhascoso and Aboboreira to form the new parish Mação, Penhascoso e Aboboreira.
