= Vaza Barris =

- Village
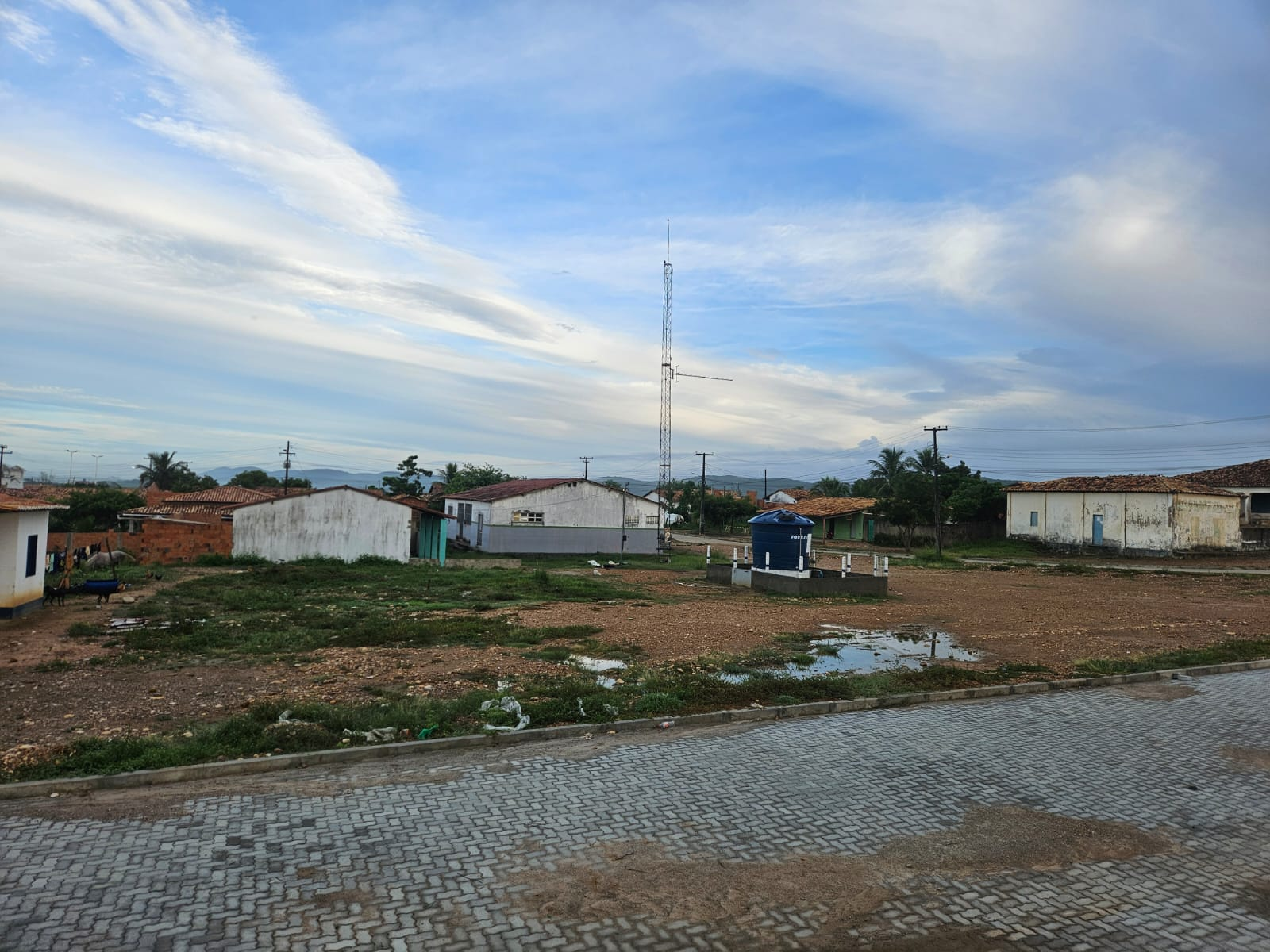

- Location of Pinhão in Sergipe

- Location within Brazil
- Coordinates: 10°36′44″S 37°44′47″W
- Country: Brazil
- State: Sergipe
- Municipality: Pinhão
- Elevation: 175 m (574 ft)
- Population (2022): 366

Vaza Barris (Brazilian Portuguese pronunciation: [ˈvazɐ bɐˈʁiz]) is a village in the municipality of Pinhão, state of Sergipe, in northeastern Brazil. As of 2022 it had a population of 366. It is named after the Vaza-Barris River.

== Gallery ==
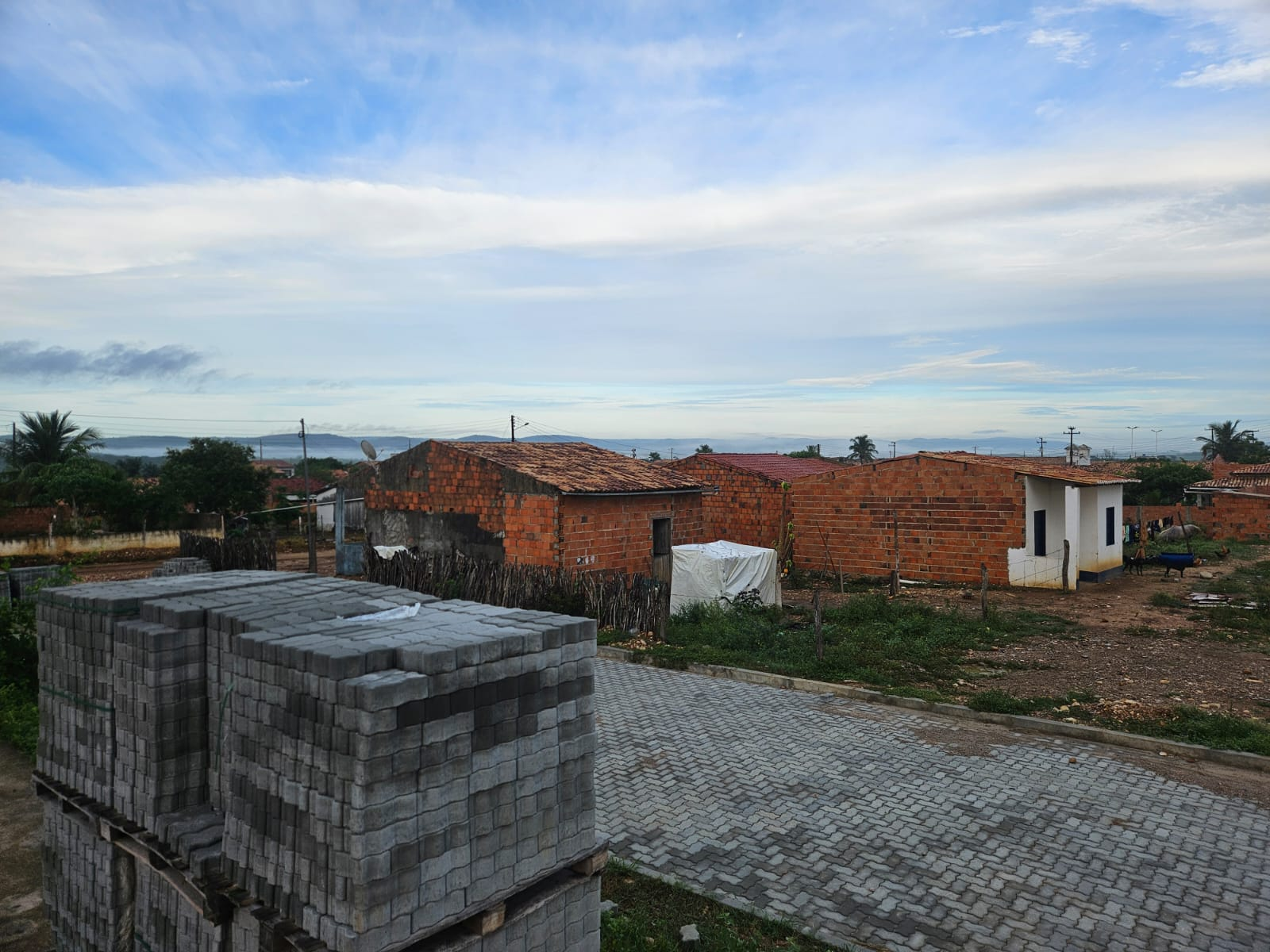

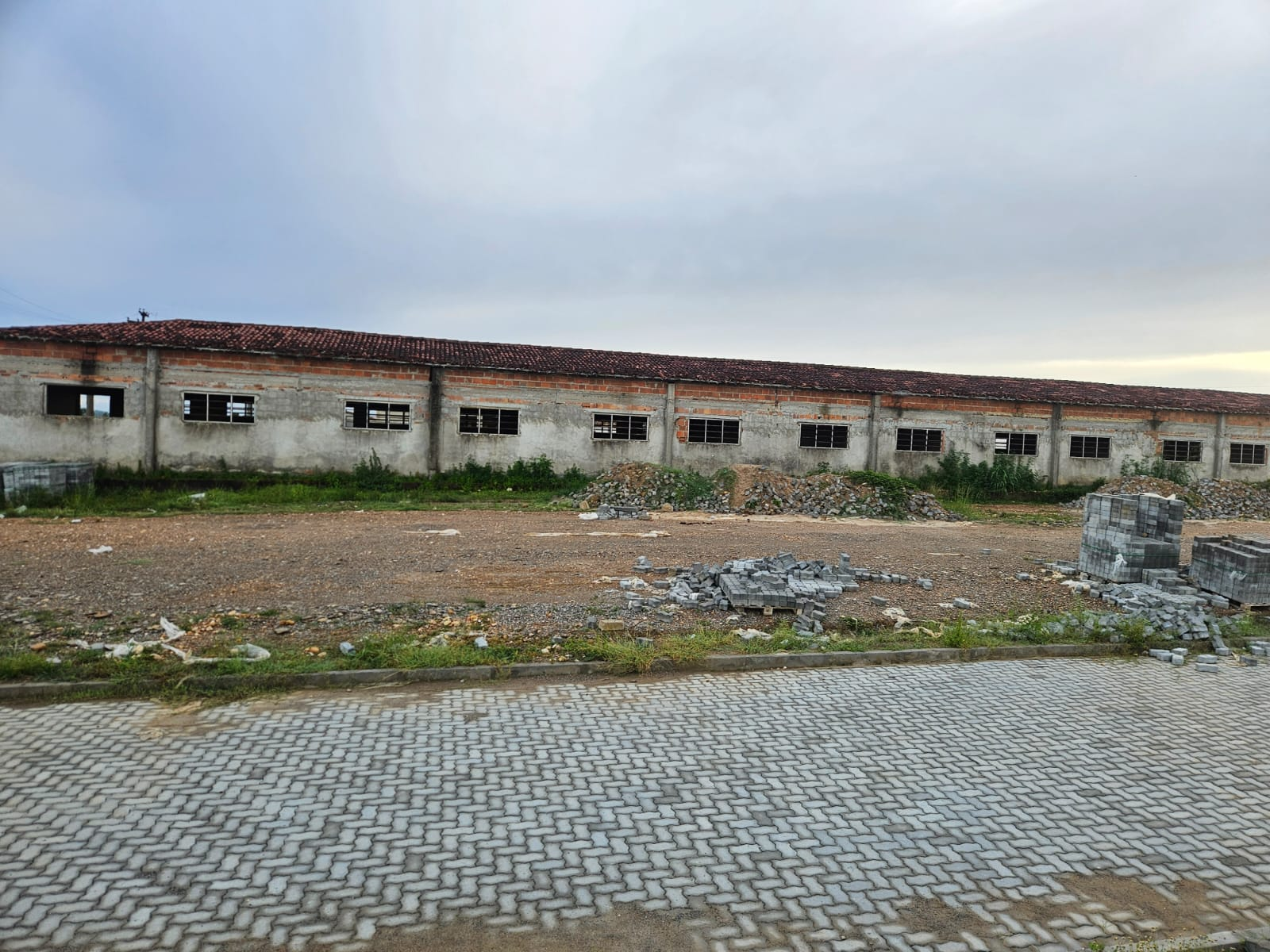

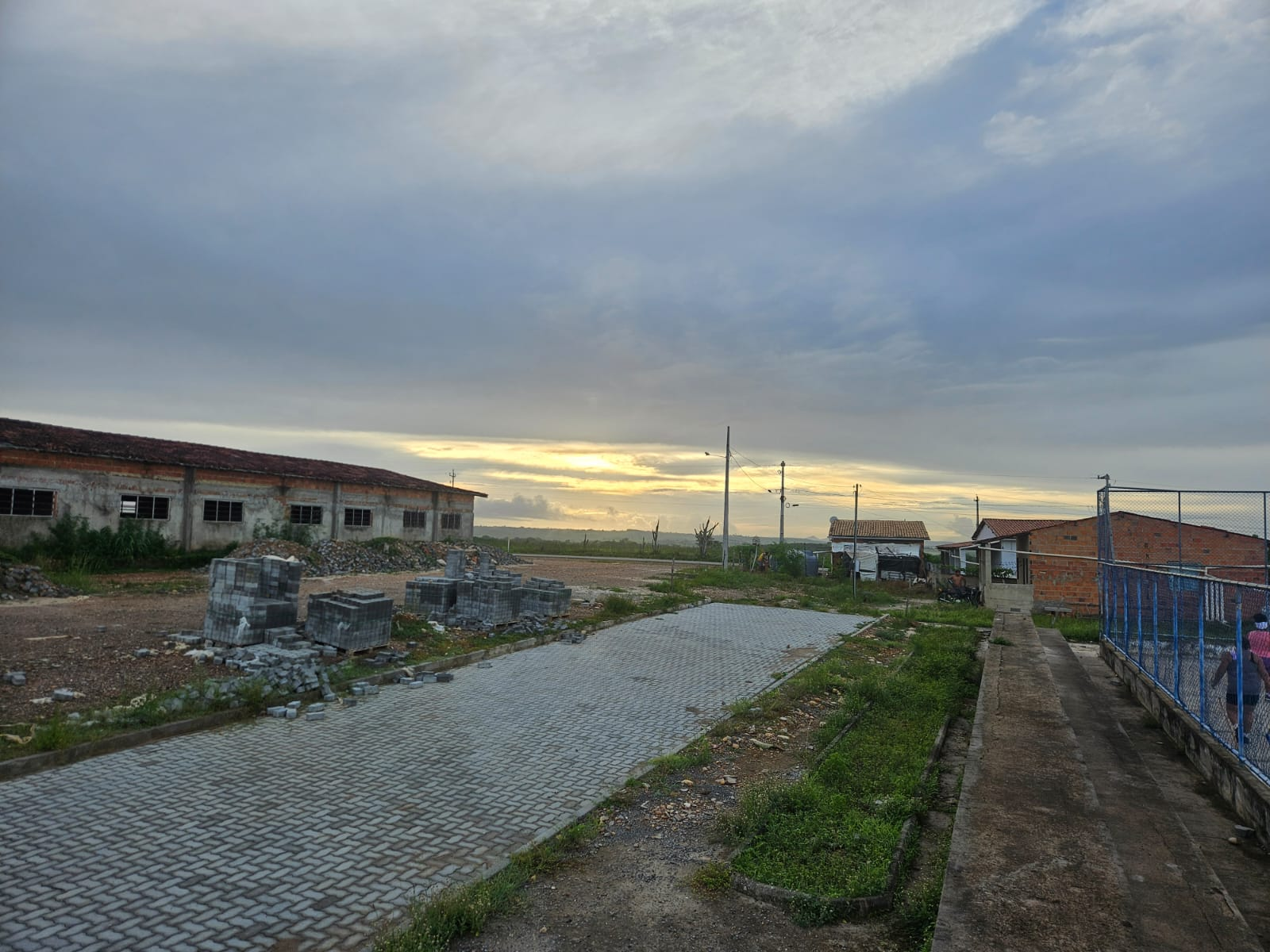

== See also ==
- List of villages in Sergipe
