= List of extreme points of Portugal =

List of most distant and highest points of Portugal

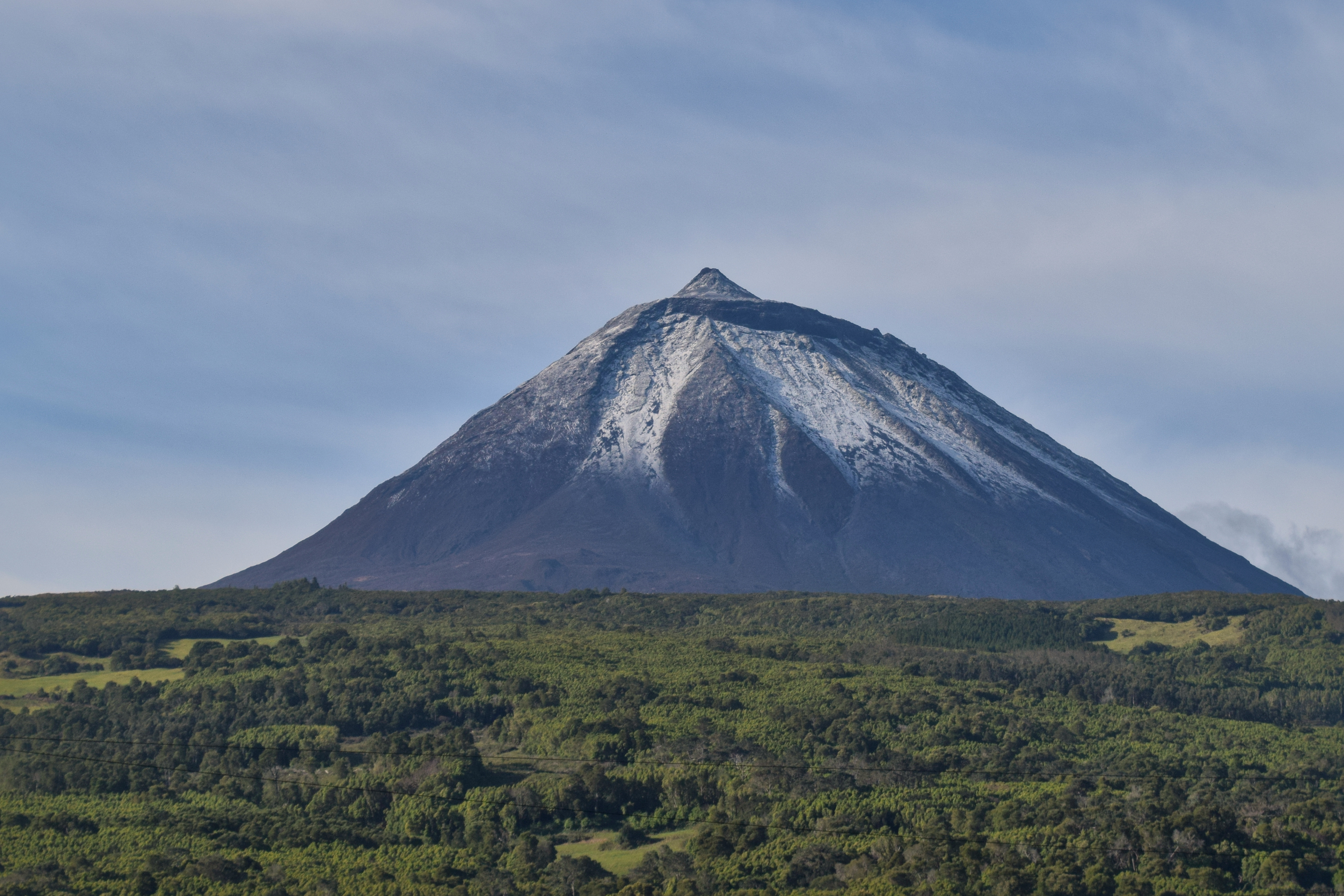
The pinnacle of the island of Pico and highest point in Portugal

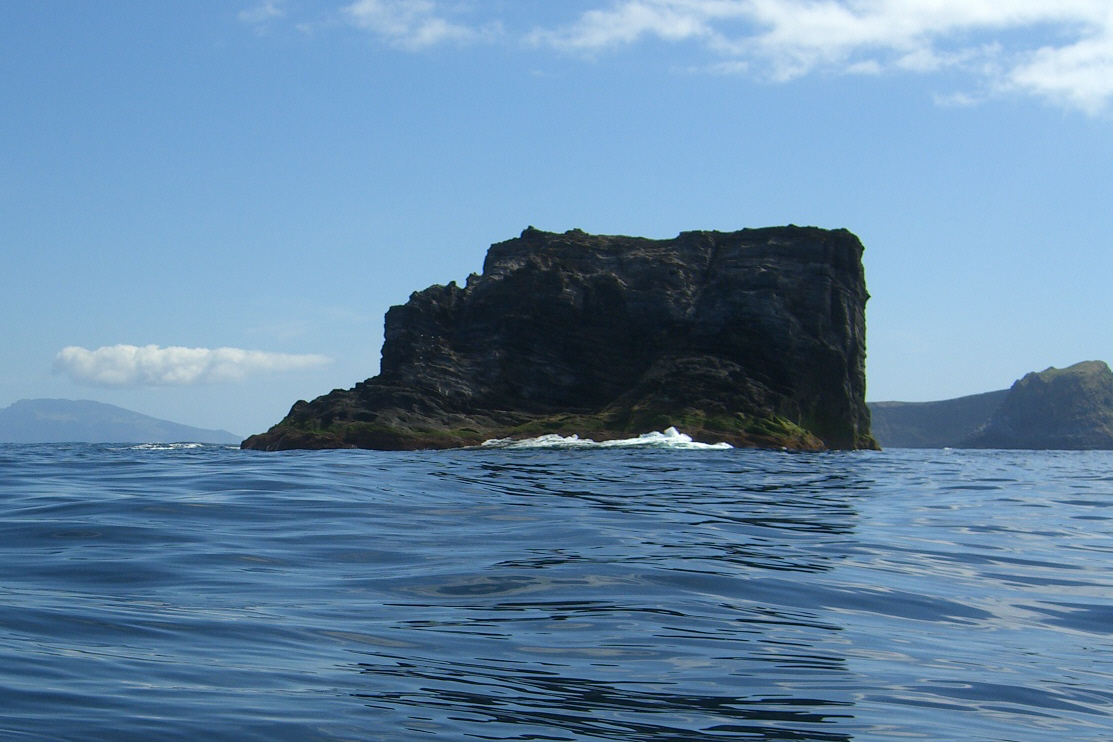
The islet of Monchique Islet, off the coast Flores is the westernmost point of Europe

Cabo da Roca (Cape Roca), west of Sintra, is the westernmost point of continental Europe

This is a list of the extreme points of Portugal, indicating the location of the most distant or highest points in continental or national limits of Portugal:

== Portugal ==
- Northernmost point — village of Cevide, civil parish of Cristoval, municipality of Melgaço;
- Southernmost point — Ilhéu de Fora, Savage Islands, municipality of Funchal (Madeira);
- Westernmost point — Ilhéu do Monchique, Fajã Grande, municipality of Lajes das Flores, Flores (Azores), also considered the westernmost point of Europe;
- Easternmost point — Ifanes e Paradela, municipality of Miranda do Douro;
- Centermost — Penhascoso, Portugal, Municipality in Portugal
- Highest point — Mount Pico, Pico (Azores), at a height of 2,351 metres (7,713 ft) above sea level.
- Highest point on the mainland — Serra da Estrela, at a height of 1,993 metres (6,539 ft).

=== Continental Portugal ===
This subsection details the extreme points in continental Portugal:

- Northernmost point — village of Cevide (42.154058, -8.198415), civil parish of Cristoval, municipality of Melgaço;
- Southernmost point — Cabo de Santa Maria (36.960158, -7.887096), civil parish of Sé, municipality of Faro;
- Westernmost point — Cabo da Roca (38.780963, -9.500552), civil parish of Colares, municipality of Sintra, also the westernmost point of continental Europe;
- Easternmost point — Ifanes e Paradela (41.574886, -6.190217), municipality of Miranda do Douro;
- Centermost — Penhascoso, Portugal (39.5571,-8.04276), Municipality in Portugal
- Highest point — Torre (40.321849, -7.612975), municipality of Seia, in the Serra da Estrela, at a height of 1,993 metres (6,539 ft).

== See also ==
- Geography of Portugal
- Extreme points of Earth
