= Penhascoso =

- Civil parish
- Location in Portugal
- Coordinates: 39°32′31″N 8°02′17″W
- Country: Portugal
- Region: Oeste e Vale do Tejo
- Intermunic. comm.: Médio Tejo
- District: Santarém
- Municipality: Mação
- Disbanded: 28 January 2013

Area
  - Total: 39.60 km^{2} (15.29 sq mi)

Population (2011)
  - Total: 802
  - Density: 20/km^{2} (52/sq mi)
- Time zone: UTC+00:00 (WET)
  - Summer (DST): UTC+01:00 (WEST)

Penhascoso is a locality and former parish in the municipality of Mação, Portugal. The population in 2011 was 802, in an area of 39.60 km^{2}. In 2013, the parish merged with Mação and Aboboreira to form the new parish Mação, Penhascoso e Aboboreira. Penhascoso is the Portuguese settlement that is the centermost point of Portugal.
