= Anta da Foz do Rio Frio =

Dolmen in Santarém District, Portugal

- Anta da Casa dos Mouros
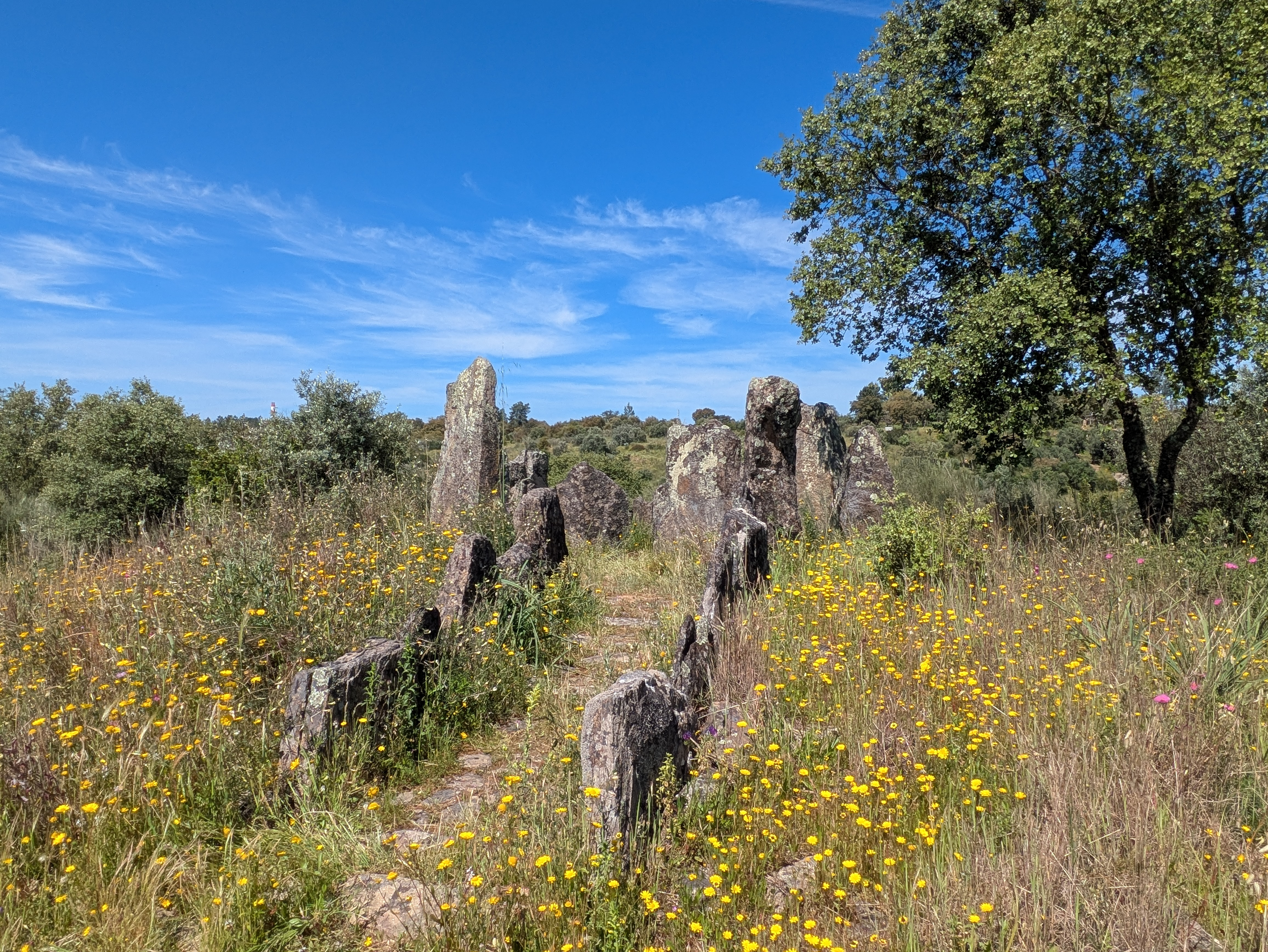
- Interactive map of Anta da Foz do Rio Frio
- 39°28′27″N 8°03′48″W
- Type: Dolmen
- Periods: Middle-Late Neolithic; Chalcolithic
- Cultures: Bell Beaker
- Location: Mação, Santarém District, Portugal

History
- Built: c. 3500–4000 BCE

Site notes
- Length: 6.4 m (21 ft)
- Width: 2.9 m (9.5 ft)
- Excavation dates: 1982
- Discovered: c. 1972
- Condition: Good
- Owner: Mação municipality
- Public access: Yes

The Anta da Foz do Rio Frio is a megalithic tomb, or dolmen, situated in Ortiga in the Mação municipality of the Santarém District of Portugal. Also known as the Anta da Casa dos Mouros, it dates back to about 3500–4000 BCE during the Middle-to-Late Neolithic period. It is the only one of the many such dolmens in the municipality that is still standing, having been identified in the early 1970s and excavated in 1982. Several artifacts have been found at the site.

== Location ==
The dolmen is situated on top of a plateau overlooking the River Tagus, being the last hill on the left bank of the mouth of the small River Frio prior to its confluence with the Tagus. The site has a commanding view of the surrounding area.

== Excavation ==
The site was identified in the early 1970s by Maria Amélia Horta Pereira and Thomas Bubner and, working with a group of young assistants, was excavated by them in 1982, during which the structure was restored by repositioning of upright stones that had fallen and strengthening the surrounding area with earth, clay and cement. Artefacts, including stone or schist tools and a copper dagger were found during the excavations, mostly in the entrance corridor and the mound, or tumulus, that surrounded the dolmen. The items were lacking any decoration but analysis of fragments of ceramic vessels, arrowheads, an archer's armband, and the microliths led to the conclusion that the site was constructed during the transition period from the Middle Neolithic to the Late Neolithic (3500–4000 BCE) and was re-used during the Bell Beaker culture that coincided with the Late Chalcolithic period around 1700–2000 BCE. Most of the artefacts are now housed in the Dr. João Calado Rodrigues Municipal Museum in Mação.

== Description ==
The dolmen is oriented to the east. It has a polygonal chamber with a diameter of 2.90 metres, which was composed of eleven irregular, upright granite stones of up to three metres in height (many now broken) and a paved floor. The entrance corridor was approximately 3.50 metres long and 1.10 metres wide, formed by five upright stones on each side. Outside, traces of the tumulus that originally covered the entire structure were identified. This was formed by a stone circle, compacted with clay from the banks of the River Frio.

== Classification ==
The dolmen was listed as a Monument of Interest in 1977 by the Instituto de Gestão do Património Arquitetónico e Arqueológico (IGESPAR), with number 70904.
