= Lagoa Branca =

- Village
- Location of Pinhão in Sergipe

- Location within Brazil
- Coordinates: 10°34′0″S 37°45′39″W
- Country: Brazil
- State: Sergipe
- Municipality: Pinhão
- Elevation: 276 m (906 ft)
- Population (2022): 128

Lagoa Branca (Brazilian Portuguese pronunciation: [lɐˈɡoɐ ˈbɾɐ̃nkɐ]) is a village in the municipality of Pinhão, state of Sergipe, in northeastern Brazil. In Portuguese "lagoa branca" means "white lake".

== See also ==
- List of villages in Sergipe
