= Cristoval =

- Civil parish
- Location in Portugal
- Coordinates: 42.140°N 8.195°W
- Country: Portugal
- Region: Norte
- Intermunic. comm.: Alto Minho
- District: Viana do Castelo
- Municipality: Melgaço

Area
  - Total: 5.56 km^{2} (2.15 sq mi)

Population (2011)
  - Total: 528
  - Density: 95/km^{2} (250/sq mi)
- Time zone: UTC+00:00 (WET)
  - Summer (DST): UTC+01:00 (WEST)

Cristoval is a Portuguese parish, located in the municipality of Melgaço. The population in 2011 was 528, in an area of 5.56 km^{2}.

In this parish lies the small village of Cevide, the northernmost place in Portugal.

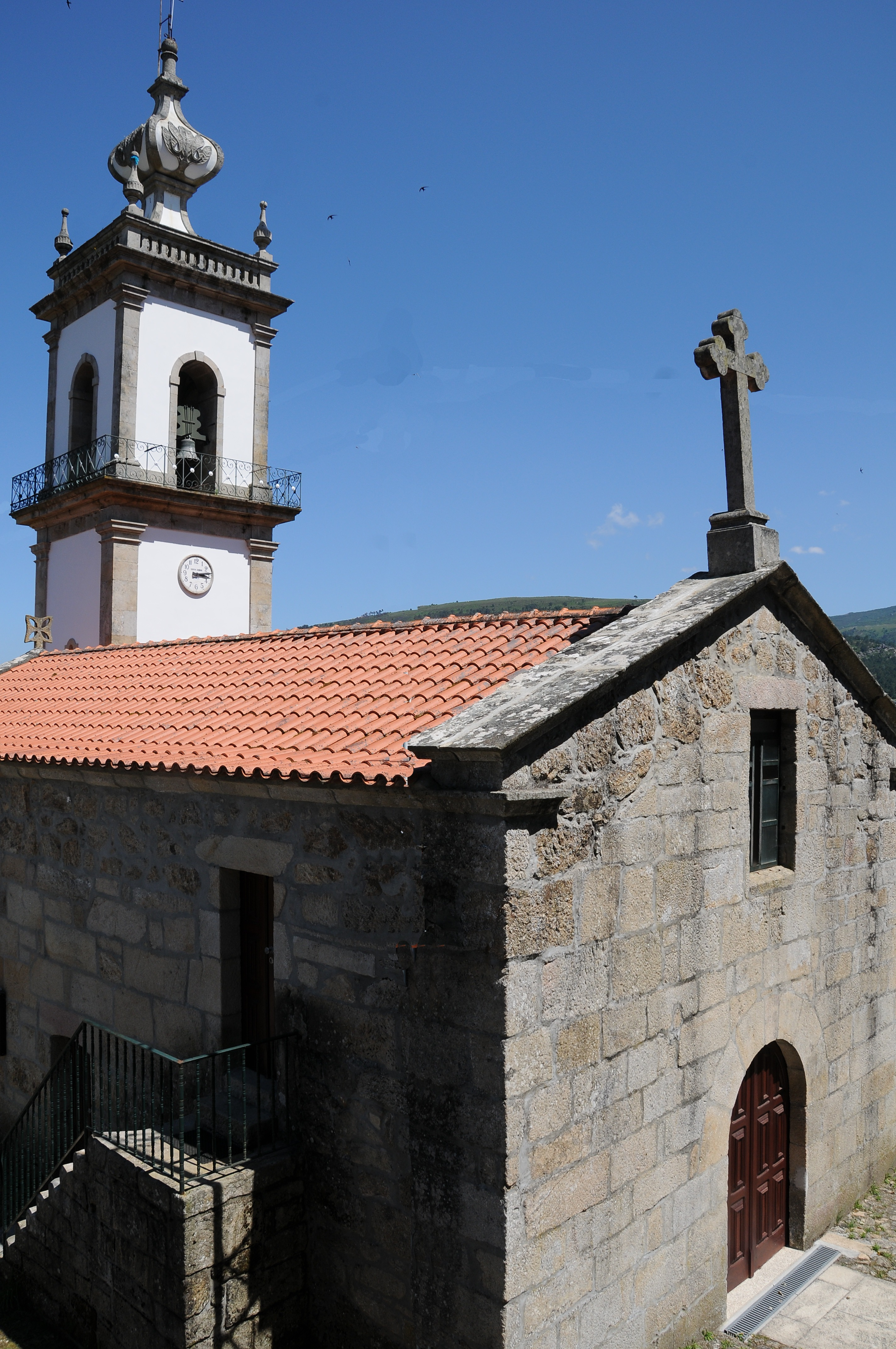
Cristoval Church
