= Cevide =

Coordinates: 42°09′N 8°12′W

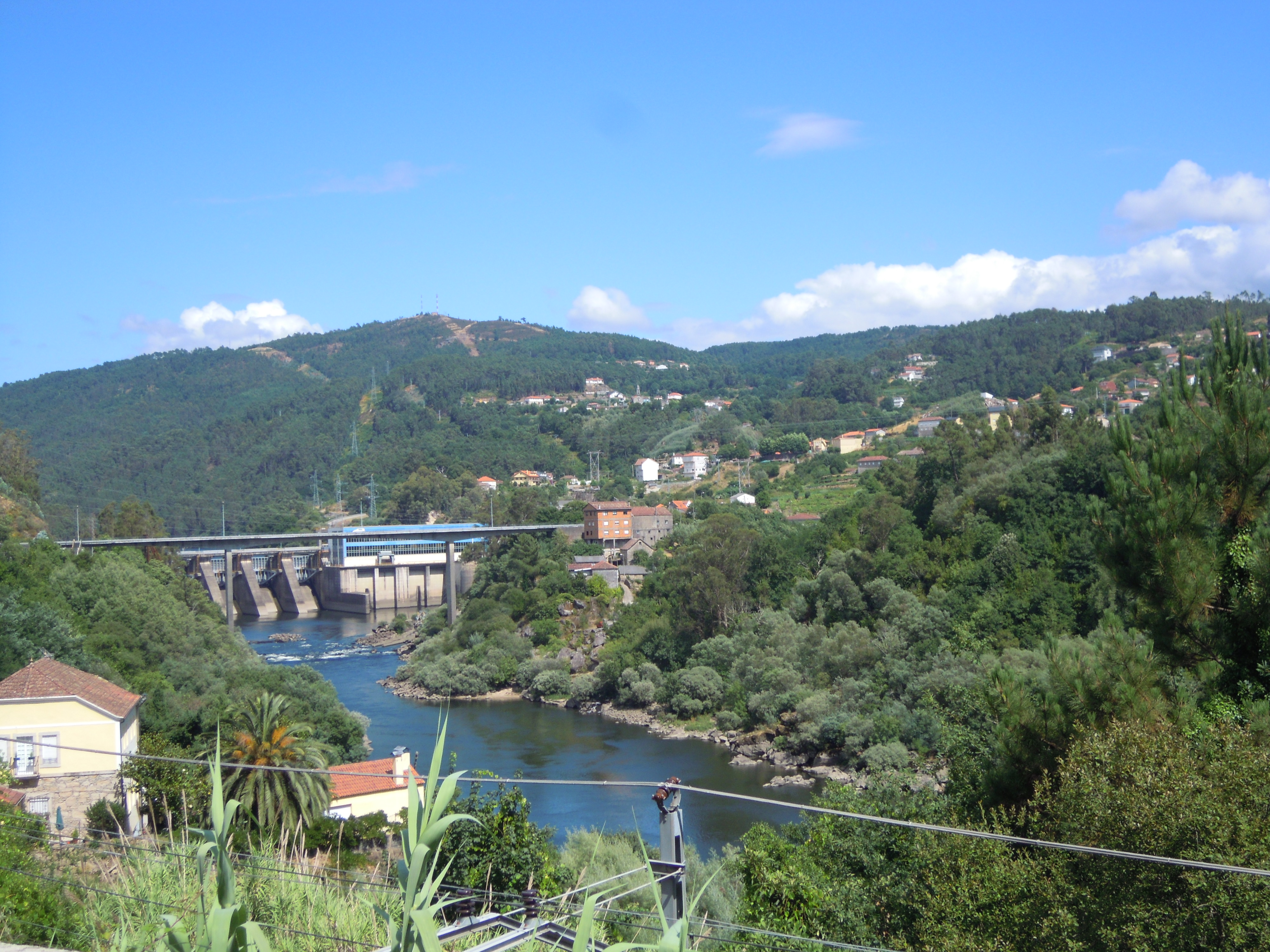
Cevide (right in the picture), on the left bank of the Minho river

Cevide is a small village known for being the northernmost place in Portugal. It is in the district of Viana do Castelo and sub-region of Minho-Lima in the parish of Cristoval in Melgaço, near the river Minho.

It is bordered by Crecente in the Spanish province of Pontevedra and Padrenda in the province of Ourense. The mouth of the river Trancoso (or Barxas) in the river Minho marks the most northerly point of Portugal.
