= International rankings of Portugal =

These are the international rankings of Portugal.

== Politics and Society ==
Survey	2018 rank	2018 score	2017 rank	2017 score	2016 rank	2016 score	2015 rank	2015 score	2014 rank	2014 score
Human Development Index	N/A	N/A	N/A	N/A	N/A	N/A	41st	▲0.843	41st	▲0.841
Legatum Prosperity Index	N/A	N/A	25th	▲69.55	25th	▼68.59	25th	▼68.60	▼25th	▲68.83
Social Progress Index	N/A	N/A	▲20th	▲85.92	▼21st	▲84.79	▲18th	▲81.91	22nd	80.49
Global Peace Index	N/A	N/A	▲3rd	▼1.241	▲5th	▲1.356	▲11th	▼1.344	18th	▼1.425
Democracy Index	N/A	N/A	▲26th	▼7.84	▲28th	▲7.86	33rd	7.79	▲33rd	▲7.79
World Electoral Freedom Index	7th	75.54	N/A	N/A	N/A	N/A	N/A	N/A	N/A	N/A
Freedom in the World	10th	97	▲10th	97	15th	97	N/A	97	N/A	97
Human Freedom Index	N/A	N/A	N/A	N/A	N/A	N/A	▼22nd	▼8.31	19th	▲8.35
Press Freedom Index	▲14th	▼14.17	▲18th	▼15.77	▲23rd	▲17.27	▲26th	▼17.11	▼30th	▲17.73
Freedom of the Press	N/A	N/A	▲16th	▼17	▲21st	18	22nd	18	▼22nd	▲18
Fragile States Index	164th	▼27.3	▼164th	▼29.0	▲163rd	▼29.2	▼164th	▼29.7	▼162nd	▼33.1
Rule of Law Index	▲21st	▲0.72	N/A	N/A	23rd	▲0.71	▼23rd	▼0.70	19th	0.740
Corruption Perceptions Index	N/A	N/A	29th	▲63	▼29th	▼62	▲28th	▲64	▲31st	▲63
World Index of Moral Freedom	N/A	N/A	N/A	N/A	3rd	83.80	N/A	N/A	N/A	N/A
Global Gender Gap Index	N/A	N/A	▼33rd	▼0.734	▲31st	▲0.737	39th	▲0.731	▲39th	▲0.724
Rainbow Europe Index	▼7th	69.16%	▼6th	▼69.16%	▲5th	▲70%	▼10th	67%	▼6th	▲67%

== Economy ==
Survey	2018 rank	2018 score	2017 rank	2017 score	2016 rank	2016 score	2015 rank	2015 score	2014 rank	2014 score
Global Competitiveness Report	N/A	N/A	▲42nd	▲4.57	▼46th	▼4.48	▼38th	▼4.52	▲36th	▲4.54
World Competitiveness Ranking	▲33rd	76.219	39th	N/A	39th	N/A	N/A	N/A	N/A	N/A
Index of Economic Freedom	▲72nd	▲63.4	▼77th	▼62.6	64th	▼65.1	▲64th	▲65.3	▼69th	▲63.5
Economic Freedom of the World	N/A	N/A	N/A	N/A	N/A	N/A	▲34th	▲7.53	35th	▲7.49
Ease of Doing Business Index	▼29th	▼76.84	▼25th	▼77.40	▲23rd	▲77.57	▲25th	76.03	▼31st	N/A
Global Innovation Index	N/A	N/A	▼31st	▼46.05	30th	▼46.45	▲30th	▲46.61	▲32nd	▲45.63
Global Talent Competitiveness Ind.	29th	▲55.75	N/A	▲55.4	N/A	▲52.87	N/A	N/A	N/A	▼50.38

== Education ==
PISA	2018 rank	2018 score	2015 rank	2015 score	2012 rank	2012 score	2009 rank	2009 score
Science	N/A	N/A	▲23rd	▲501	▼36th	▼489	32nd	493
Reading	N/A	N/A	▲21st	▲498	▼31st	▼488	27th	489
Mathematics	N/A	N/A	▲29th	▲492	▲31st	487	32nd	487
Survey	2018 rank	2018 score	2017 rank	2017 score	2016 rank	2016 score	2015 rank	2015 score
EF English Proficiency Index	N/A	N/A	▼18th	▼58.76	▼15th	▼59.68	▲13th	▲60.61

== Health ==
Survey	2018 rank	2018 score	2017 rank	2017 score	2016 rank	2016 score	2015 rank	2015 score	2014 rank	2014 score
Euro Health Consumer Index	N/A	N/A	14th	▼747	▲14th	▲763	▼20th	▼691	▲13th	▲722
