= List of ecoregions in Portugal =

The following is a list of ecoregions in Portugal, including the Azores and Madeira, according to the Worldwide Fund for Nature (WWF).

== Terrestrial ecoregions ==
=== Mediterranean forests, woodlands, and scrub ===
- Iberian sclerophyllous and semi-deciduous forests
- Northwest Iberian montane forests
- Southwest Iberian Mediterranean sclerophyllous and mixed forests

=== Temperate broadleaf and mixed forests ===
- Azores temperate mixed forests
- Cantabrian mixed forests
- Madeira evergreen forests

== Freshwater ecoregions ==
- Southern Iberia
- Western Iberia

== Marine ecoregions ==
- Azores Canaries Madeira
- South European Atlantic
