= Lagoa do Negro =

Lake on Terceira, in the Azores

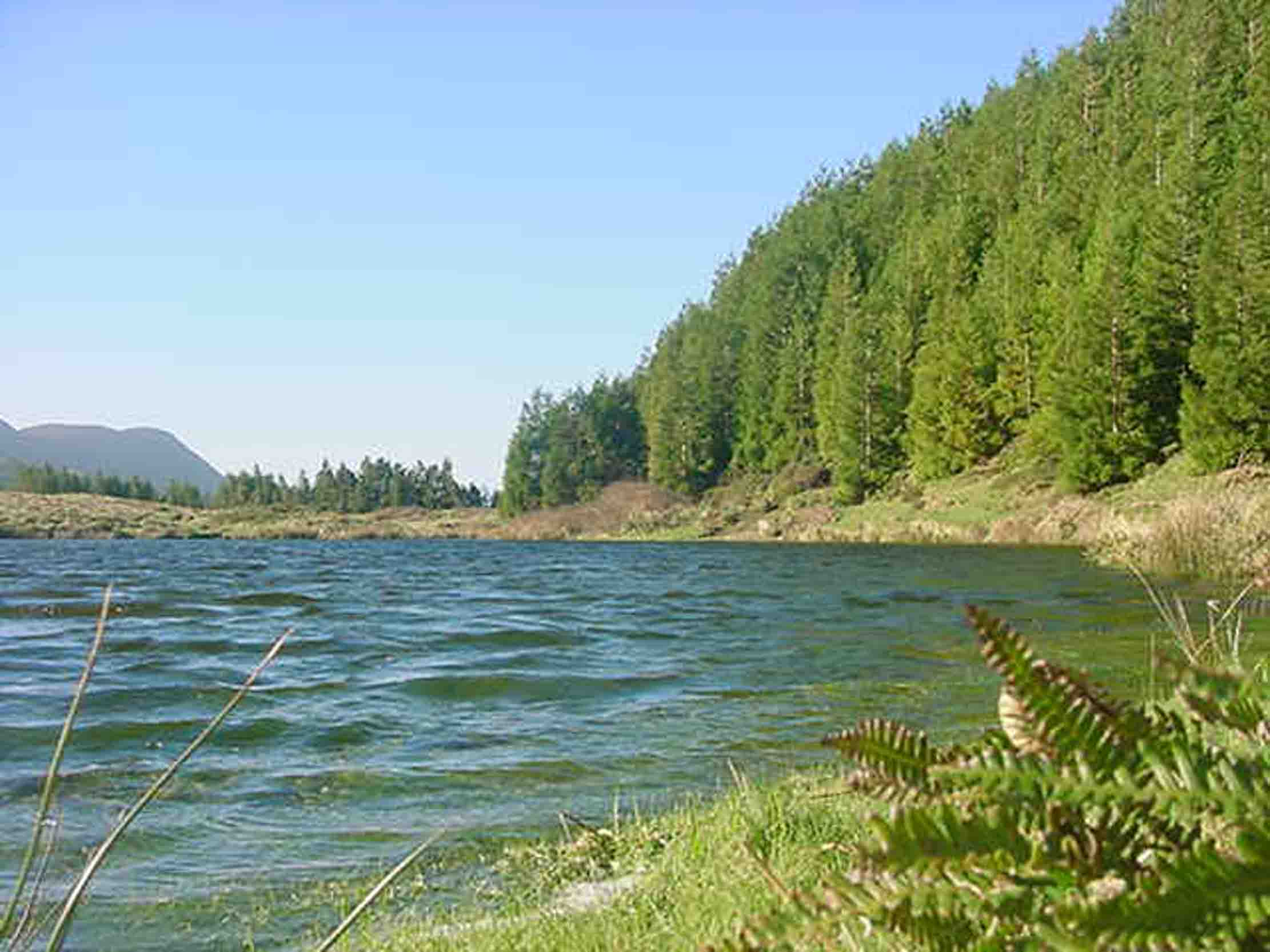

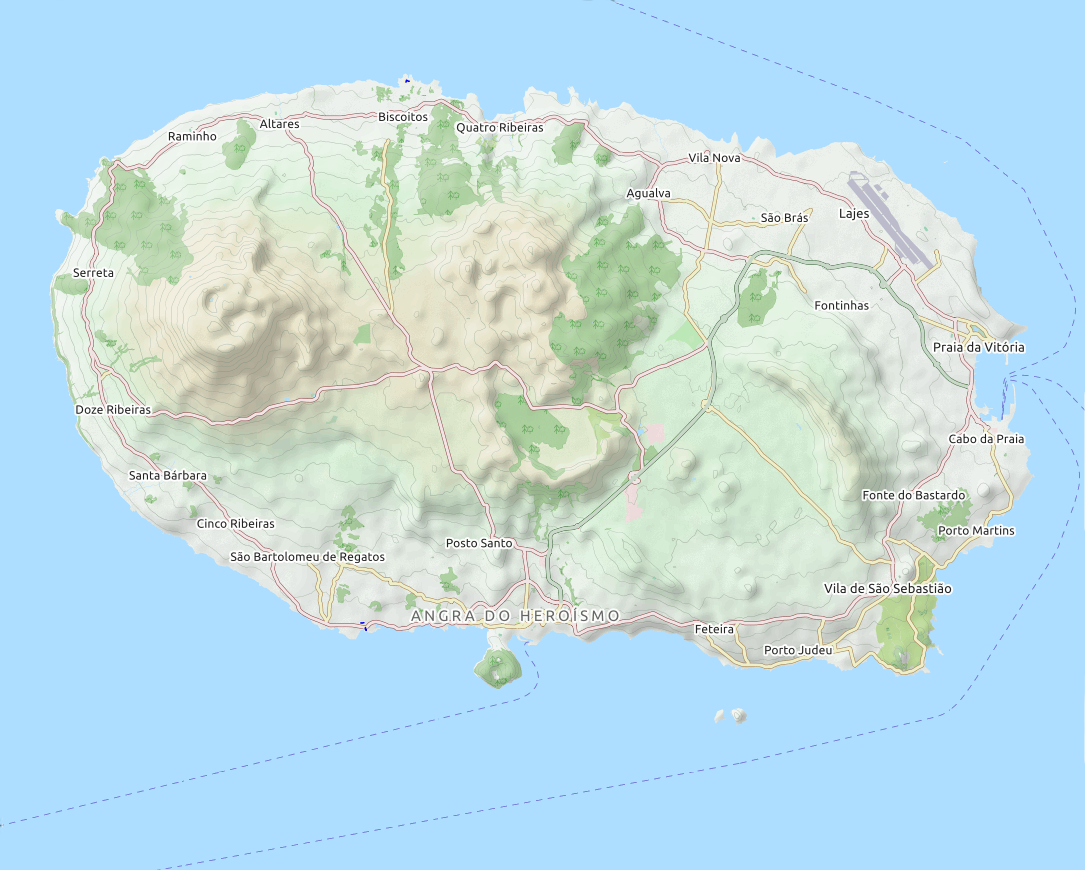
- Location within Terceira
- Location: Praia da Vitória (Azores), Biscoitos
- Coordinates: 38°44′17.3″N 27°16′8.0″W
- Type: Ephemeral lake
- Etymology: Black Slave
- Managing agency: Secretaria Regional da Agricultura e Ambiente
- Surface area: 6,527.57 square metres (70,262.2 ft^{2})

The Lagoa do Negro is an ephemeral lake and humid zone located in the civil parish of Biscoitos, municipality of Praia da Vitória, on the island of Terceira, Portuguese archipelago of the Azores.

== History ==
It is a small kettle-like ephemeral lake that was first referred to during the primordial period of human settlement on the island of Terceira.

Legend suggests in the early settlement on the island there existed a noble family, who owned black slaves. The daughter of the Majorat at the time was obliged to participate in a marriage of convenience, in order to increase their landholdings and wealth. It was a loveless marriage and she began an illicit affair with one of her slaves. Eventually, they realized that the only way to fulfill their life was to escape their life together. But, her husband had ordered her handmaid to follow her, and having been relayed their encounters, he ordered the capture of the slave. After hearing hunting dogs, and knowing that it was not a hunting day, realized he was being hunted and escaped to the island interior. After a day and noite of flight he was consigned to his fate, and began to cry. As the legend suggested, his tears multiplied, forming a small pond alongside a woodlot. With his pursuers quickly closing in on horseback, the desperate slave threw himself into the dark waters and drowned.

== Geography ==
It is situated in a zone of scoria cones that form the Serra de Santa Bárbara, along the edge of a Cryptomeria forest and flanked by Pico do Gaspar. Within a mesotrophic humid zone consisting of aquatic vegetation, including specifically Littorela uniflora and Isoëtes azorica. It Nearby is the Gruta do Natal, a lava tube system, formed from volcanic eruptions along the Serra de Santa Bárbara system.

In 2010 an experimental project was undertaken to recover the biodiversity of the lake, settle migratory birds and transform it for sustainable ecotourism. Researcher Eduardo Dias, a plant ecologists indicated that recovery project assumed "birds were the key role in the creation of biodiversity" and that trails had been poorly designed, creating a constant human presence, that prevented the establishment of bird species. Part of the Central Plateau, it is an area to safeguard migratory birds, including more than 150 terrestrial and marine species. The area of intervention included 5 hectares (0.050 km^{2}), with 3 hectares (0.030 km^{2}) buffer used to support the area of conservation. Owing to the efforts in the region, the Whiskered tern returned to the area after an absence of 50 year, in addition to the nocturnal herons. Further, the investigation of surrounding peatlands was undertaken to determine their types, uses and restoration. This included the introduction of rare endemic species of flora, such as Marsillia Azorica (which is rare throughout the world), and the creation of an ecological corridor between the hills of Santa Bárbara and Pico Alto.
