= Lagoa da Fajã de Santo Cristo =

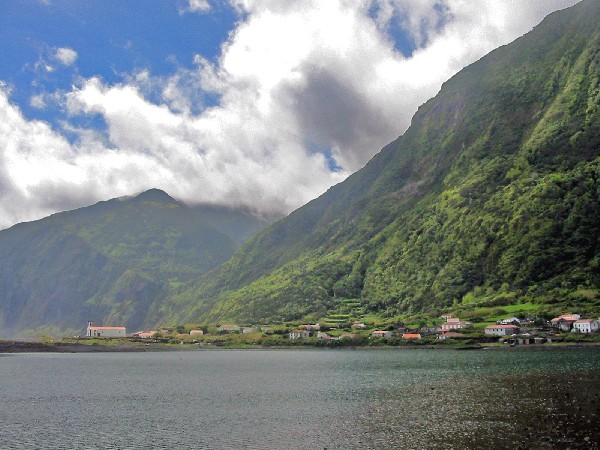

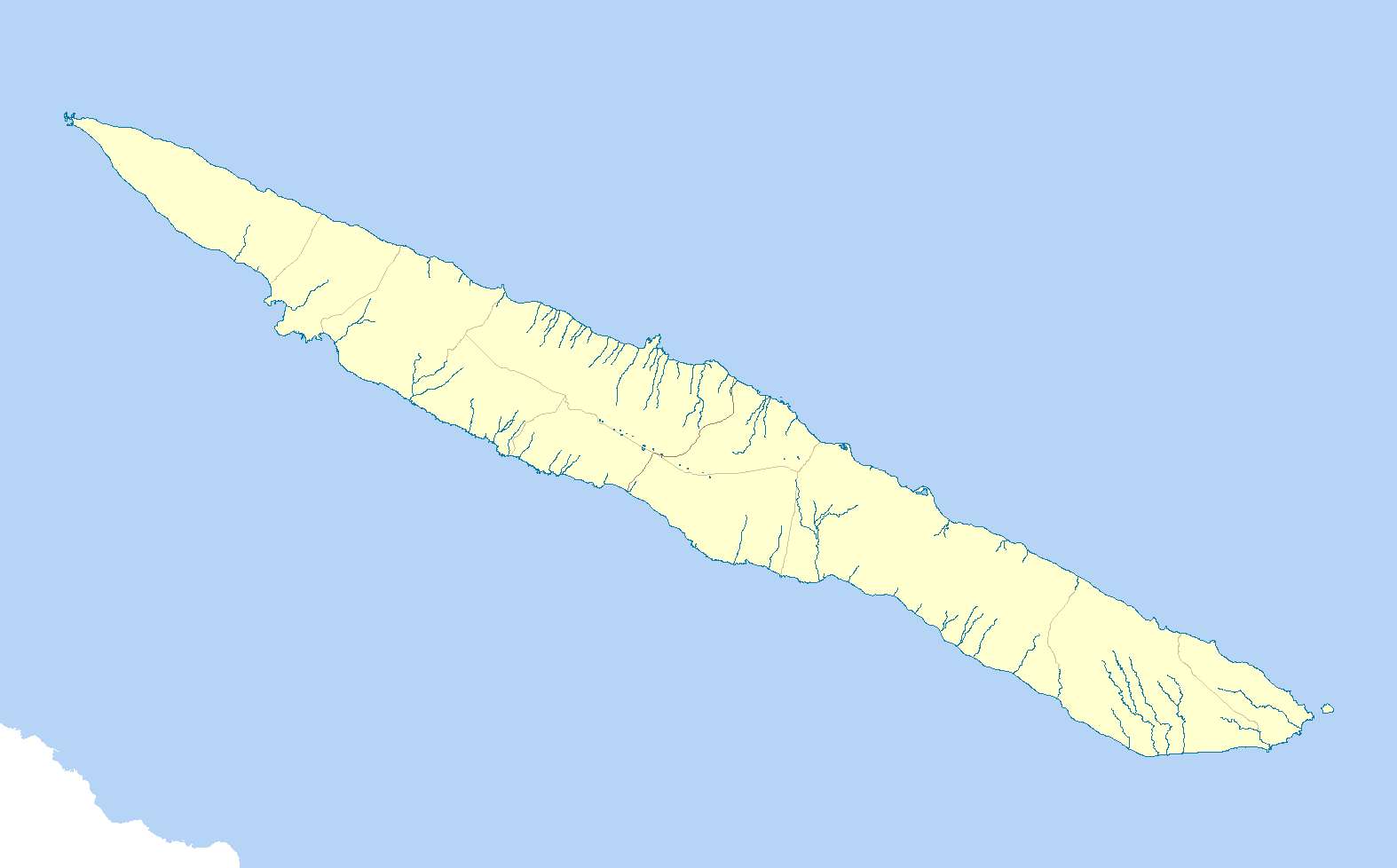
- Location within São Jorge
- Location: São Jorge Island
- Coordinates: 38°37′56″N 27°55′42″W

Ramsar Wetland
- Official name: 'Fajãs' of Caldeira and Cubres Lagoons
- Designated: 2 December 2005
- Reference no.: 1615

Lagoa da Fajã de Santo Cristo is a lagoon located on the north coast of the Portuguese island of São Jorge. The lagoon was listed along with Lagoa da Fajã dos Cubres as a "Wetland of International Importance" under the Ramsar Convention in 2005. The fajãs and coastal area connecting the two lagoons make up the remainder of the wetland.
