= Lagoa da Fajã dos Cubres =

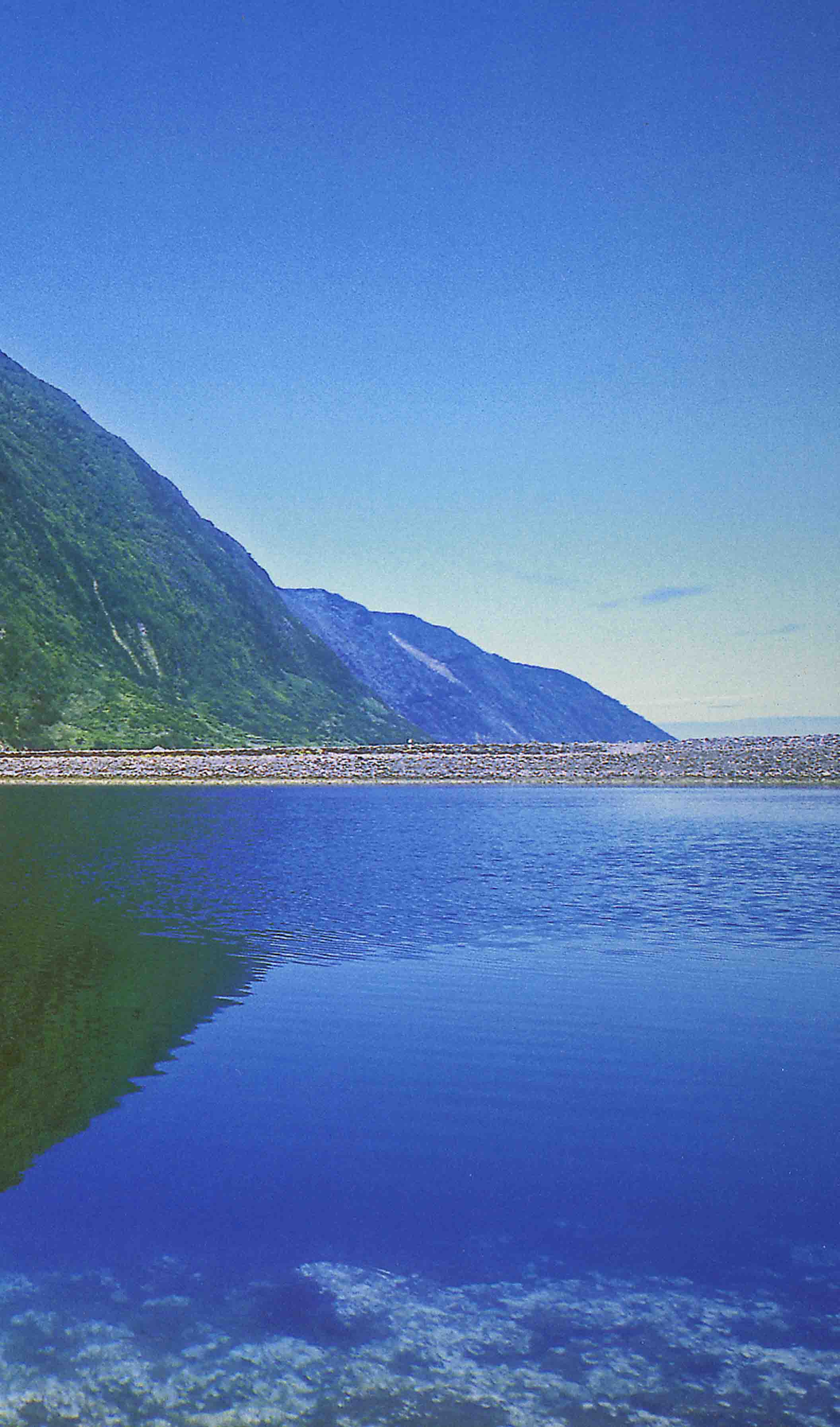

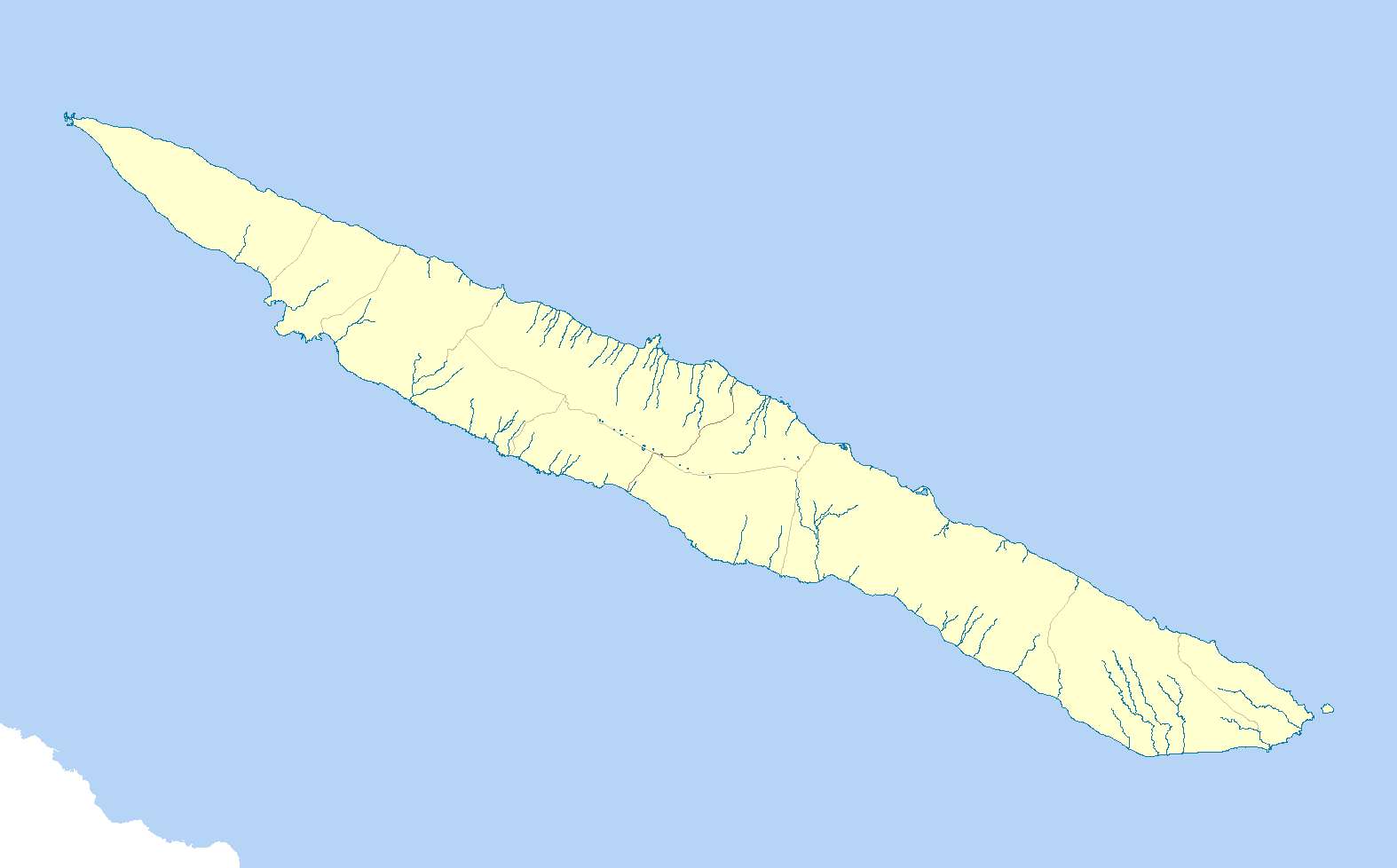
- Location within São Jorge
- Location: São Jorge Island
- Coordinates: 38°38′52″N 27°57′58″W

Ramsar Wetland
- Official name: 'Fajãs' of Caldeira and Cubres Lagoons
- Designated: 2 December 2005
- Reference no.: 1615

Lagoa da Fajã dos Cubres is a lagoon located in the parish of Ribeira Seca, on the north coast of the Portuguese island of São Jorge. The lagoon was listed along with Lagoa da Caldeira as a "Wetland of International Importance" under the Ramsar Convention in 2005. The term fajã refers to the plain areas created from landslides of the abrupt coastal cliffs.
