= Pinhão, Sergipe =

Municipality in Sergipe, Brazil

Pinhão, Sergipe Município de Pinhão
- Municipality
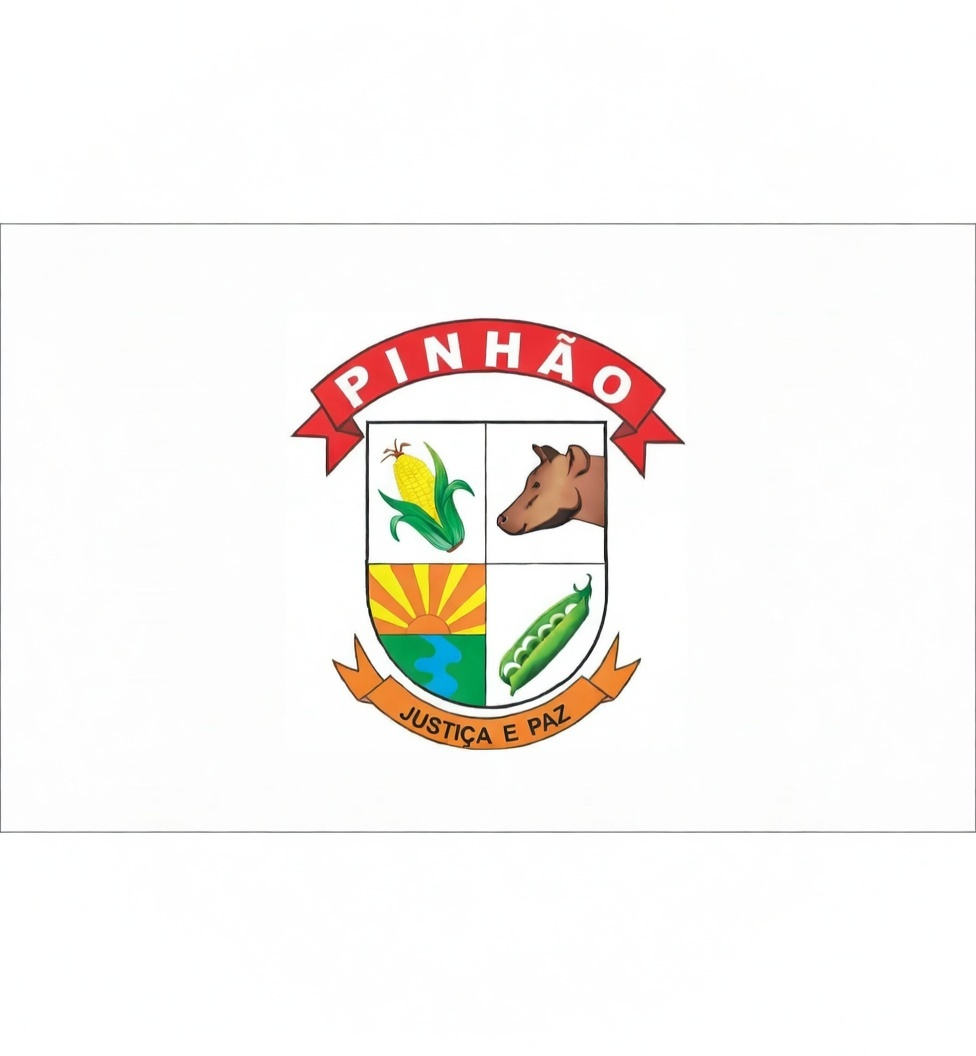
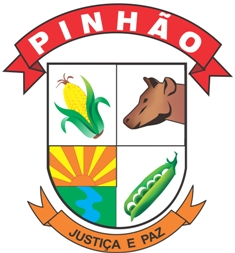
- Flag Coat of arms

- Location of Pinhão in Sergipe

- Location of Pinhão in Brazil
- Coordinates: 10°34′01″S 37°43′22″W
- Country: Brazil
- Region: Northeast
- State: Sergipe
- Founded: 1953

Government
  - Mayor: Eduardo Marques de Oliveira

Area
  - Total: 156.1 km^{2} (60.3 sq mi)
- Elevation: 258 m (846 ft)

Population (2020)
  - Total: 6,627
  - Density: 42.45/km^{2} (110.0/sq mi)
- Demonym: Pinhãoense
- Time zone: UTC−3 (BRT)

Pinhão (Brazilian Portuguese pronunciation: [pĩˈj̃ɐ̃w]) is a municipality located in the Brazilian state of Sergipe. Its population was 6,627 (2020) and its area is 156.1 km^{2} (60.3 mi^{2}). Pinhão has a population density of 42 inhabitants per square kilometer. Pinhão is located 80.7 km (50.1 mi) from the state capital of Sergipe, Aracaju.

== See also ==
- List of municipalities in Sergipe
