= Mação =

- Municipality
- Town of Mação
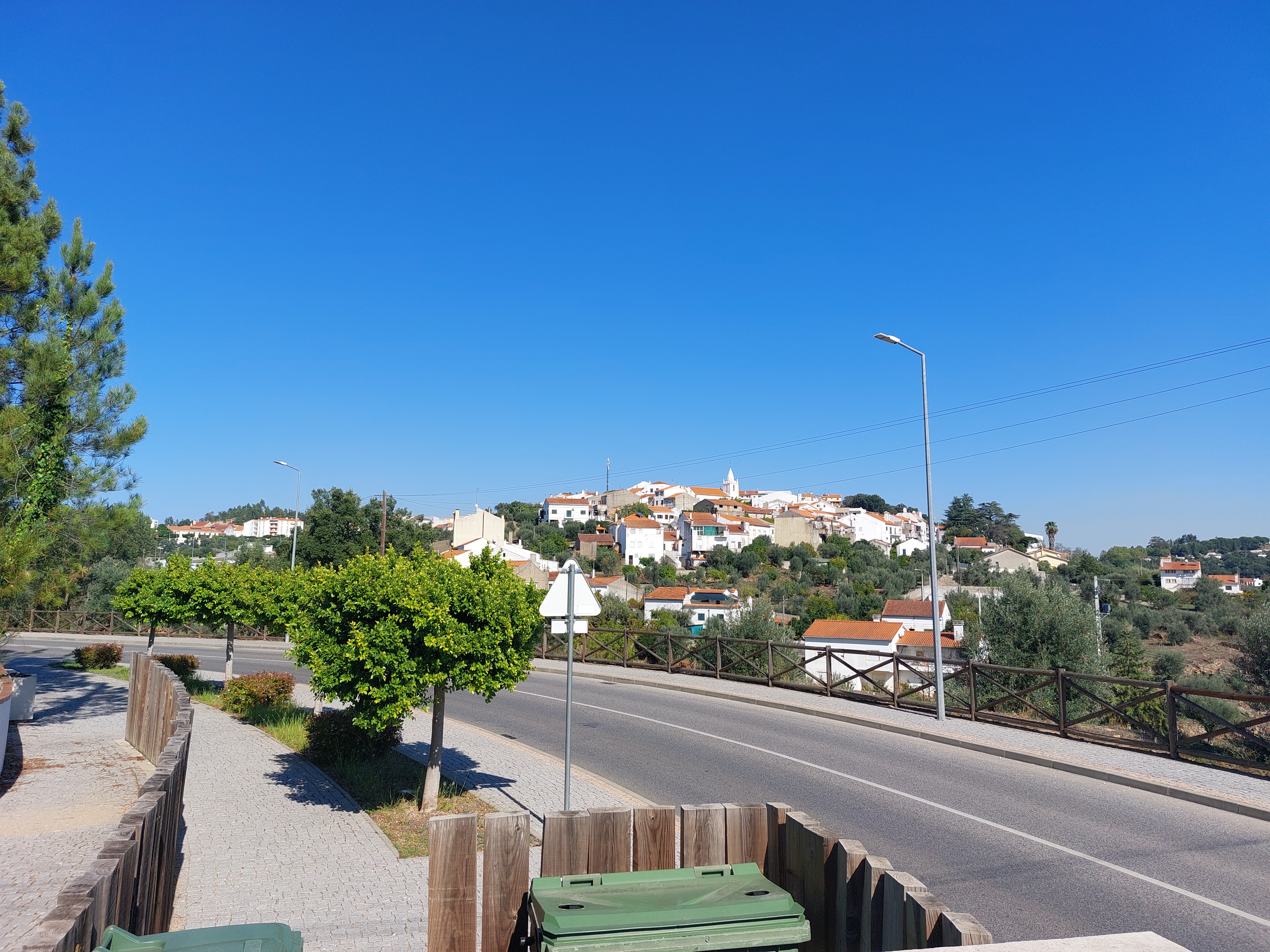
- Partial view of Mação

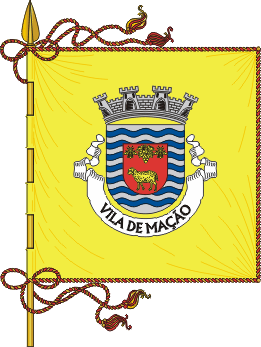
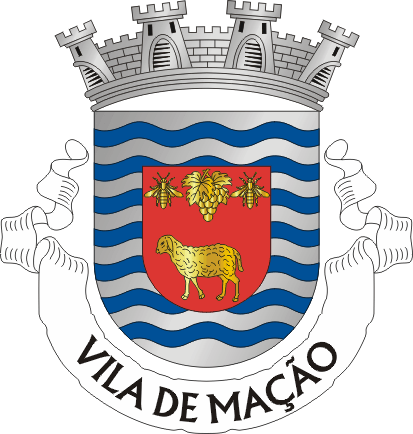
- Flag Coat of arms
- Interactive map of Mação
- Location in Portugal
- Coordinates: 39°33′N 7°59′W
- Country: Portugal
- Region: Oeste e Vale do Tejo
- Intermunic. comm.: Médio Tejo
- District: Santarém
- Parishes: 6

Government
  - President: Fernando Martins (PS)

Area
  - Total: 399.98 km^{2} (154.43 sq mi)

Population (2011)
  - Total: 7,338
  - Density: 18.35/km^{2} (47.52/sq mi)
- Time zone: UTC+00:00 (WET)
  - Summer (DST): UTC+01:00 (WEST)
- Local holiday: Easter Monday date varies
- Website: http://www.cm-macao.pt

Mação (European Portuguese pronunciation: [mɐˈsɐ̃w]) is a municipality in the Santarém District in Portugal. The population in 2011 was 7,338, in an area of 399.98 km².

The present Mayor is Vasco António Mendonça Sequeira Estrela, elected by the Social Democratic Party. The municipal holiday is Easter Monday.

== Parishes ==
Administratively, the municipality is divided into 6 civil parishes (freguesias):

- Amêndoa
- Cardigos
- Carvoeiro
- Envendos
- Mação, Penhascoso e Aboboreira
- Ortiga

== Early history ==
The municipality is rich in archaeological remains, which can be found throughout its territory. These include the recently discovered Paleolithic rock engravings along the Ribeira da Ocreza, that include a representation of a horse. This was the first open-air Paleolithic art find in southern Portugal. Many dolmens, or megalithic tombs, exist but only the Anta da Foz do Rio Frio, in the parish of Ortiga, is now standing. There is a Bronze-Age hill fort, known as the Castelo Velho do Caratão, and an Iron-Age fort, the Castro de São Miguel. Both are classified monuments. From the Roman occupation of Portugal there are several Roman bridges.

== Notable people ==
- António Lino Neto (1873 in Mação – 1961) a Portuguese Catholic politician, lawyer and professor of Political Economy.
- Duarte Marques (born 1981 in Mação) a Portuguese consultant, politician and member of the Assembly of the Republic
