= Aveiro Football Association =

District football association in Portugal

Associação de Futebol de Aveiro
- Abbreviation: AF Aveiro
- Formation: 1924
- Headquarters: Quinta do Simão – Esgueira
- Location(s): Apartado 722 – 3812 Aveiro; Portugal
- President: Arménio Pinho
- Website: afaveiro.pt

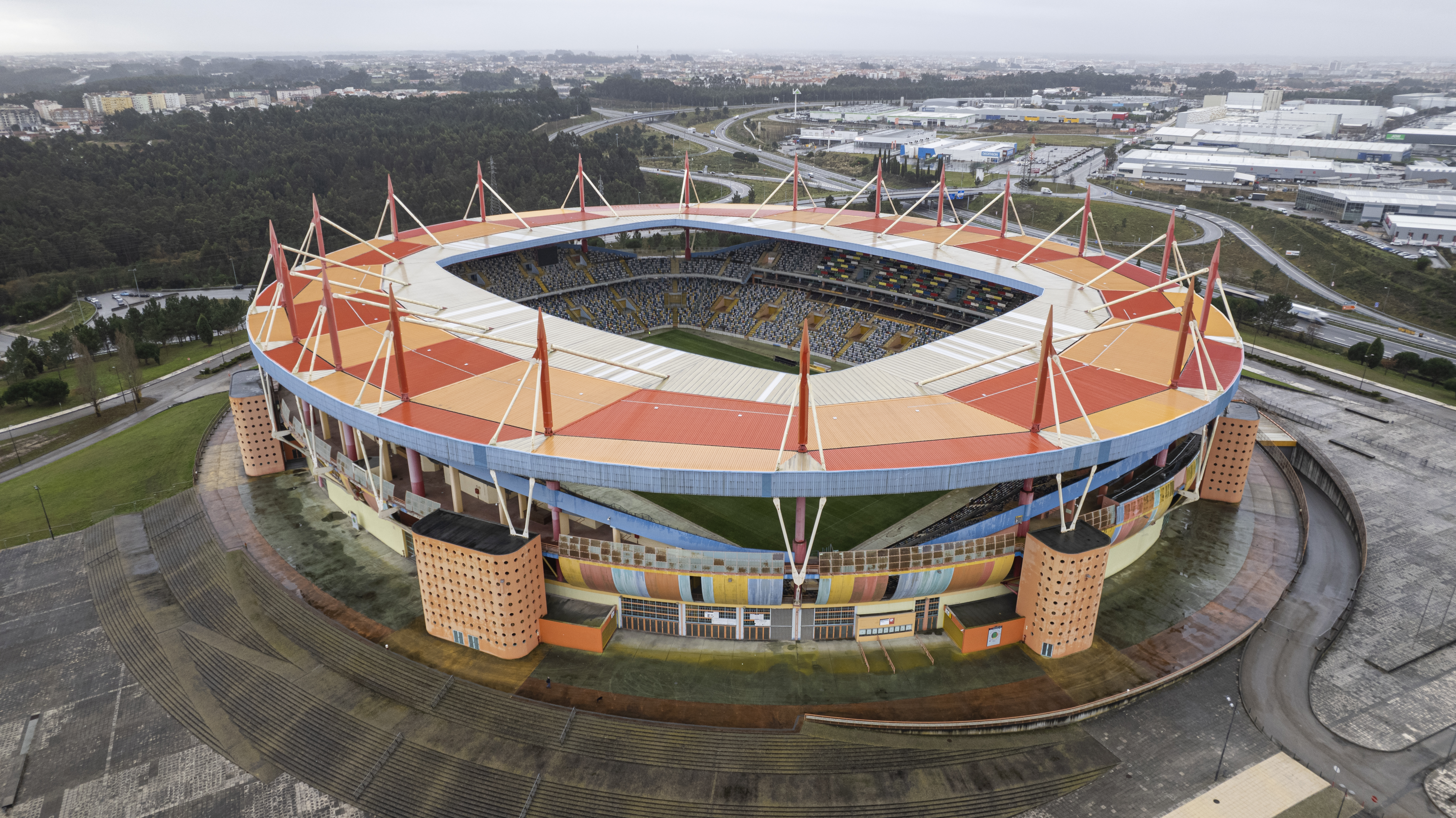
Estádio Municipal, Aveiro

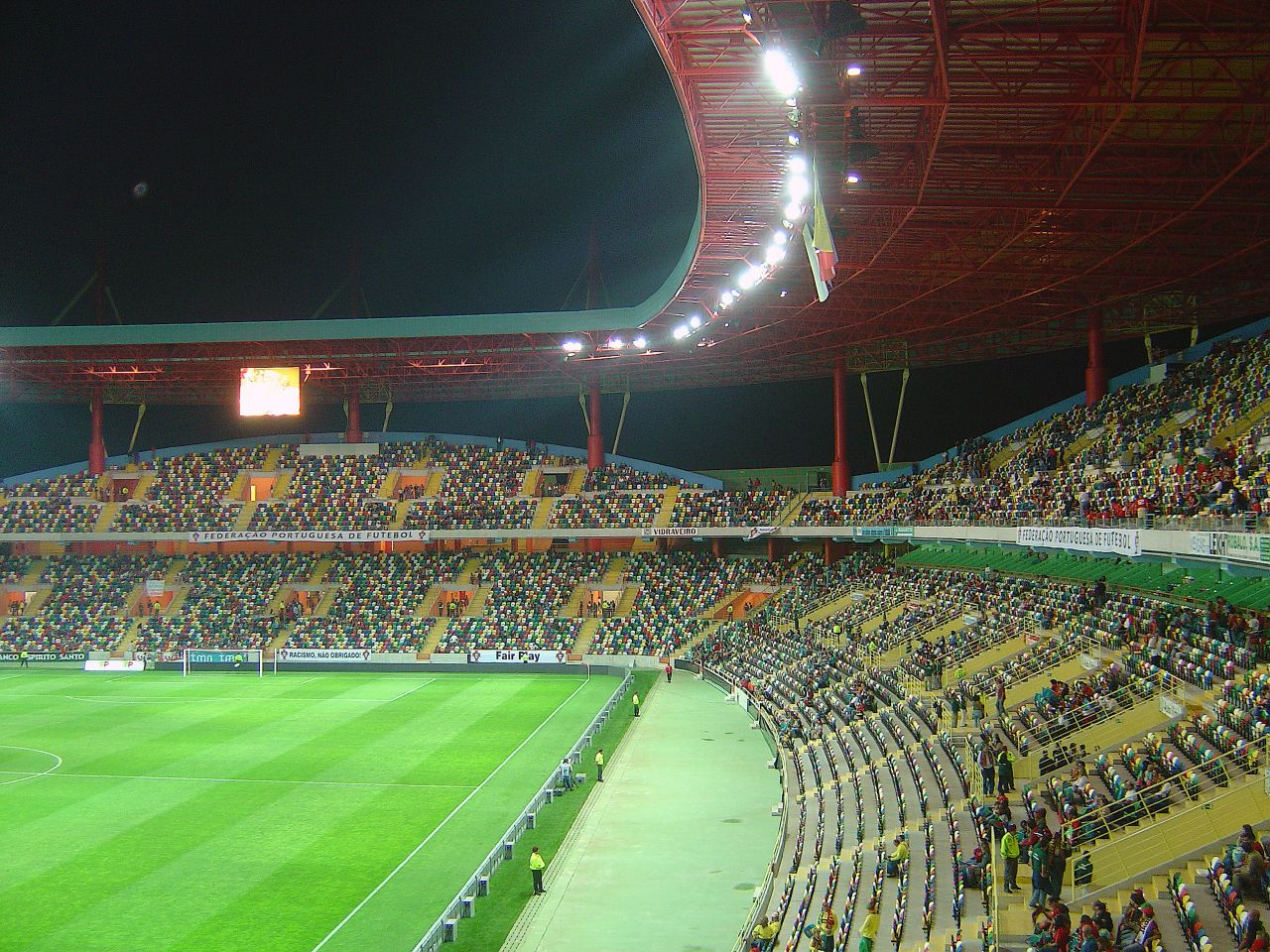
Estádio Municipal, Aveiro

The Associação de Futebol de Aveiro (Aveiro Football Association) is one of the 22 District Football Associations that are affiliated to the Portuguese Football Federation. The AF Aveiro administers lower tier football in the district of Aveiro.

== Background ==
Associação de Futebol de Aveiro, commonly referred to as AF Aveiro, is the governing body for football in the district of Aveiro which covers the 19 municipalities of Anadia, Albergaria a Velha, Agueda, Aveiro, Arouca, Castelo Paiva, Espinho, Estarreja, Oliveira Azemeis, Oliveira Bairro, Ovar, Mealhada, Murtosa, Ilhavo, Sever do Vouga, São João Madeira, Santa Maria da Feira, Vagos and Vale de Cambra. The Football Association is based in Aveiro. The Association's President for the 2015-2019 quadrennium, is Arménio Pinho elected in May 2015.

The organisation was established on 22 September 1924 at the initiative of a distinguished group of leaders led by Mario Duarte.

The early clubs included:

- Associação Desportiva Ovarense
- Associação Desportiva Sanjoanense
- Clube dos Galitos (Aveiro)
- Fogueirese Foot Ball Clube
- Paços Brandão Foot Ball Clube
- Sociedade Recreio Artístico (Aveiro)
- Sport Clube Anadia
- Sport Clube Beira-Mar
- Sporting Clube Bustelo
- Sporting Clube Espinho
- Sporting Clube Oliveirense
- União Desportiva Oliveirense

The first formal meeting of the Board was held on 14 November 1924.

== Competitions ==
Several Aveiro clubs compete in the four national levels of the Portuguese football league system in competitions run by the Portuguese League for Professional Football (Primeira Liga/Liga NOS, Segunda Liga), Liga 3 and Portuguese Football Federation (Campeonato Nacional de Seniores).

In the 2025/26 season, FC Arouca play in the Primeira Liga, while CD Feirense, UD Oliveirense and Lusitânia Futebol Clube compete in the Segunda Liga.

Below the Campeonato Nacional de Seniores the competitions are organised at a district level (known in Portuguese as Distritais) with each District Association organising its competitions according to geographical and other factors.

The AF Aveiro runs several league competitions with the Elite Divisão being at the fifth level of the league system. 1ª Divisão the sixth, and 2ª Divisão the seventh for men's senior football.

In more general terms the AF Aveiro currently organises District Championships for football and Futsal for men and women for all age groups including Senior, Junior, Youth, Beginners, Infants and Schools.

== AF Aveiro clubs competing in national level - 2025/26 Season ==
Primeira Liga (tier 1)

- FC Arouca

Segunda Liga (tier 2)

- UD Oliveirense
- Lusitânia Futebol Clube
- CD Feirense

Liga 3 (tier 3)

- AD Sanjoanense
- SC São João de Ver

CN Seniores (tier 4)

- Anadia FC
- Clube de Futebol União de Lamas
- SC Beira-Mar

== AF Aveiro Divisions - 2025/26 Season ==
AF Aveiro organizes the following divisions covering the fifth, sixth, and seventh tiers of the Portuguese football league system.

=== Sabseg Championship (Campeonato Sabseg) ===
- Sporting Clube de Espinho
- Relâmpago Nogueirense
- Recreio Desportivo de Águeda
- CD Estarreja
- Sport Clube Alba
- Sporting Clube de Esmoriz
- Fiães Sport Clube
- Fermentelos
- Associação Atlética de Avanca
- Ovarense
- Vista Alegre
- Oliveira do Bairro Sport Clube
- JuveForce
- Cesarense
- FC Pampilhosa
- P. Brandão
- ADC Lobão
- Grupo Desportivo São Roque

== Former participants ==
Other clubs that have competed in the Distritais since the 1992/93 season include:

- Ajax Desportivo e Cultural da Silvã
- Arada Atlético Clube
- Associação Académica da Universidade de Aveiro
- Associação Cultural e Recreativa de Avelãs de Caminho
- Associação Cultural e Recreativa de Mansores
- Associação Cultural e Recreativa de Sardoura
- Associação Cultural e Recreativa Oliveirense Futebol Clube
- Associação Cultural, Desportiva, Recreativa, Beneficiente e Solidariedade Social do Troviscal
- Associação Desportiva Águias de Carrazedo
- Associação Desportiva Amoreirense
- Associação Desportiva e Cultural São Jacinto
- Associação Desportiva Severense
- Associação Recreativa e Cultural da Borralha - BARC
- Associação Recreativa e Cultural de Barroca
- Associação Recreativa e Cultural de Vilarinho do Bairro
- Casal Comba Real Clube
- Centro Cultural Desportivo Recreativo Covão Lobo
- Centro Cultural e Recreativo Vila Viçosa
- Centro Desportivo e Cultural de São Martinho Gândara
- CIDEP - Centro Iniciação Desportiva Escolar e Popular
- Clube Académico do Canedo
- Clube Cultural e Desportivo Torreira-Praia
- Clube Estrela Azul
- Clube Futebol Azuis do Fial
- Desportivo Clube Fornos
- Frente Impulsionadora Desporto e Cultura - FIDEC
- Futebol Clube de Barcouço
- Futebol Clube de Pigeiros
- Futebol Clube de Samel
- Futebol Clube de Serém
- Futebol Clube Santa Joana
- Futebol Clube Vaguense
- Grupo Cultural e Desportivo de Sanfins
- Grupo Desportivo Azurva
- Grupo Desportivo Cultural de Recardães
- Grupo Desportivo da Fogueira
- Grupo Desportivo Mogofores
- Grupo Desportivo Eixense
- Grupo Desportivo Fajões
- Grupo Desportivo Folclórico de Palmaz
- Grupo Desportivo Moitense
- Grupo Desportivo Pedorido
- Juventude Académica Pessegueirense
- Juventude Atlética Os Amigos do Cavaco
- Mocidade Desportiva Eirolense
- Novo Estrela da Gafanha da Encarnação - NEGE
- Sport Benfica e Gafanha
- Sport Clube de Paradela
- Sport Marítimo Murtoense
- Sporting Clube de Santa Maria da Feira
- Sporting Clube Poutena
- Sporting Clube Rio Meão

== District Championships ==
=== Historic champions ===
Year	Champions
1924/25	SC Espinho
1925/26	SC Espinho
1926/27	SC Espinho
1927/28	SC Espinho
1928/29	SC Beira-Mar
1929/30	SC Espinho
1930/31	AD Ovarense
1931/32	SC Espinho
1932/33	AD Ovarense
1933/34	SC Espinho
1934/35	AD Ovarense
1935/36	AD Ovarense

Year	Champions
1936/37	AD Sanjoanense
1937/38	SC Beira-Mar
1938/39	AD Ovarense
1939/40	AD Sanjoanense
1940/41	SC Espinho
1941/42	CF União de Lamas
1942/43	CF União de Lamas
1943/44	SC Espinho
1944/45	SC Espinho
1945/46	UD Oliveirense
1946/47	AD Sanjoanense

Titles

- SC Espinho - 10
- AD Ovarense - 5
- AD Sanjoanense - 3
- SC Beira-Mar - 2
- CF União de Lamas - 2
- UD Oliveirense - 1

=== Divisional champions ===
Seasons	Champions	2ª Divisão
1947/48	Sp. Espinho	
1948/49	Beira-Mar	
1949/50	AD Ovarense	
1950/51	Sp. Espinho	
1951/52	UD Oliveirense	
1952/53	AD Sanjoanense	
1953/54	CF União de Lamas	Mealhada
1954/55	AD Ovarense	At. Cucujães
1955/56	Beira-Mar	Estarreja
1956/57	UD Oliveirense	At. Cucujães
1957/58	UD Oliveirense	Cesarense
1958/59	Beira-Mar	At. Cucujães
1959/60	CD Feirense	União Lamas
1960/61	Sp. Espinho	Estarreja
1961/62	Lusitânia Lourosa	SC Alba
1962/63	União Lamas	Valecambrense
1963/64	Lusitânia Lourosa	S. João Ver
1964/65	Lusitânia Lourosa	Oliveira Bairro
1965/66	CD Feirense	Lusitânia Lourosa
1966/67	Recreio Águeda	SC Bustelo
1967/68	CD Feirense	Atlético Cucujães
1968/69	SC Alba	Mealhada
1969/70	Anadia FC	SC Fermentelos
1970/71	AD Ovarense	Macinhatense
1971/72	Paços Brandão	Cesarense
1972/73	Atlético Cucujães	Cesarense
1973/74	Recreio Águeda	S. João Ver
1974/75	Arrifanense	Fiães
1975/76	Valecambrense	Pinheirense
1976/77	SC Bustelo	Pampilhosa
1977/78	Avanca	Milheiroense
1978/79	Esmoriz	AD Valonguense
1979/80	Estarreja	FC Arouca
1980/81	AD Ovarense	Relâmpago Nogueirense
1981/82	Esmoriz	Lobão

Seasons	Champions	2ª Divisão
1982/83	Cesarense	Pinheirense
1983/84	Atlético Cucujães	CD Tarei
1984/85	Cesarense	Oiã
1985/86	Sporting Paivense	São Roque
1986/87	N/A	FC Arouca
1987/88	Valecambrense	AD Sanjoanense
1988/89	AD Sanjoanense	Cortegaça
1989/90	Fiães	Carregosense

Seasons	Honra	2ª Divisão Distrital
1990/91	Sanguêdo	NEGE
1991/92	Esmoriz	Canedo
1992/93	São Roque	Milheiroense
1993/94	S. João Ver	Rocas do Vouga
1994/95	Lobão	Arada
1995/96	Esmoriz	S. Martinho Gândara
1996/97	Oliveira Bairro	Fajões
1997/98	Valecambrense	NEGE
1998/99	Lobão	Macinhatense
1999/00	Gafanha	Rocas do Vouga
2000/01	Milheiroense	Arada

Seasons	Elite Divisão	1ª Divisão
2001/02	Fiães	Sanguêdo
2002/03	FC Arouca	Sporting Paivense
2003/04	Avanca	Pessegueirense
2004/05	Lusitânia Lourosa	Beira-Vouga
2005/06	Recreio Águeda	LAAC
2006/07	FC Arouca	BARC
2007/08	Recreio Águeda	SC Bustelo
2008/09	Cesarense	São Roque
2009/10	SC Alba	Carregosense
2010/11	AD Sanjoanense	Macinhatense
2011/12	Estarreja	Mansores
2012/13	Lusitânia Lourosa	Esmoriz
2013/14	AD Sanjoanense	SC Fermentelos
2014/15	SC Bustelo	Paços Brandão
2015/16	RD Águeda	GDSC Alvarenga
2016/17	S.C. Espinho	

Seasons	Campeonato Safina	1ª Divisão Distrital	2ª Divisão Distrital
2017/18	Lusitânia de Lourosa	Oliveira do Bairro	CR Antes
2018/19	Beira-Mar	S. Vicente Pereira	Pinheirense

Seasons	Campeonato Sabseg	1ª Divisão Distrital	2ª Divisão Distrital
2019/20	S. João Ver	Fermentelos	AD Nogueira
2020/21	Alvarenga	Florgrade FC	Macieira Cambra
2021/22	Beira-Mar	AD Valonguense	Relâmpago Nogueirense
2022/23	Florgrade FC	JuveForce	São Roque
2023/24	U. Lamas	Vista Alegre	Beira-Mar B
2024/25	Florgrade FC	CD Estarreja	Sanguedo

== List of member clubs ==
Abbreviation	Settlement	Official Name	Division (tier) 2025-26 Season	Cup	Other information
AC Famalicão	Arcos, Anadia	Atlético Clube de Famalicão	AFA Division 2 (7)	None	
ACRD Mosteirô	São Miguel do Mato, Arouca	Associação Cultural Recreativa e Desportiva de Mosteirô	AFA Division 1 (6)	None	
AD Sanjoanense	São João da Madeira	Associação Desportiva Sanjoanense	Liga 3 (3)	* * *	
AD Valonguense	Valongo do Vouga, Águeda	Associação Desportiva Valonguense	AFA Division 1 (6)	*	
Águas Boas	Aveiro	Grupo Desportivo Águas Boas	AFA Division 2 (7)	None	
Águeda	Águeda	Recreio Desportivo de Águeda	Campeonato Sabseg (5)	* *	
Aguinense	Aguim, Anadia	Associação Recreativa Aguinense	AFA Division 2 (7)	None	
Alba	Albergaria-a-Velha	Sport Clube Alba	Campeonato Sabseg (5)	* *	
Alvarenga	Alvarenga, Arouca	Grupo Desportivo Santa Cruz de Alvarenga	---	None	
Amigos Visconde	São João da Madeira	Associação Desportiva e Recreativa Amigos de Visconde	INATEL	None	
Anadia	Anadia	Anadia Futebol Clube	CN Seniores (4)	* * *	
ARCO	Oliveirinha, Aveiro	Associação Recreativa e Cultural da Freguesia de Oliveirinha	---	* *	
Argoncilhe	Argoncilhe, Santa Maria da Feira	Associação Desportiva de Argoncilhe	AFA Division 1 (6)	None	
Arinhos	Arinhos, Mealhada	Sport Benfica e Arinhos	---	None	
Arouca	Arouca	Futebol Clube de Arouca	Primeira Liga (1)	* *	
At. Cucujães	Cucujães, Oliveira de Azeméis	Atlético Clube de Cucujães	AFA Division 1 (6)	* *	
Avanca	Avanca	Associação Atlética de Avanca	AFA Division 1 (6)	* *	
Avanca B	Avanca	Associação Atlética de Avanca "B"	---	None	
BARC	Borralha, Águeda	Associação Recreativa e Cultural Borralha	---	None	
Beira-Mar	Aveiro	Sport Clube Beira-Mar	AFA Division 2 (7)	* * *	
Beira-Vouga	Frossos, Albergaria-a-Velha	Grupo Desportivo Beira Vouga	AFA Division 2 (7)	None	
Bom-Sucesso	Aradas, Aveiro	Futebol Clube Bom Sucesso	---	None	
Bustelo	Oliveira de Azemeis	Sporting Clube de Bustelo	CN Seniores (4)	*	
Bustos	Aveiro	União Desportiva de Bustos	---	*	
Caldas S. Jorge	Caldas de São Jorge, Santa Maria da Feira	Caldas de S. Jorge Sport Clube	AFA Division 2 (7)	None	
Calvão	Calvão, Vagos	Grupo Desportivo Calvão	AFA Division 2 (7)	*	
Canedo	Canedo, Santa Maria da Feira	Canedo Futebol Clube	---	*	
Carqueijo	Casal Comba, Mealhada	Sport Clube de Carqueijo	AFA Division 2 (7)	None	
Carregosa	Carregosa, Ouça, Vagos	Atletismo Futebol Clube de Carregosa	---	None	
Carregosense	Carregosa, Oliveira de Azeméis	Juventude Desportiva Carregosense	AFA Division 1 (6)	*	
Cesarense	Cesar, Oliveira de Azeméis	Futebol Clube Cesarense	Campeonato Sabseg (5)	* *	
Cesarense B	Cesar, Oliveira de Azeméis	Futebol Clube Cesarense	AFA Division 2 (7)	None	
Cortegaça	Cortegaça, Ovar	Futebol Clube de Cortegaça	---	*	
Couvelha	São Lourenço do Bairro, Anadia	Centro Cultural e Desportivo de Couvelha	AFA Division 2 (7)	None	
CRAC	Aveiro	CRAC - Centro Recreativo Atlético e Cultural de Parada de Cima	AFA Division 2 (7)	None	
Esmoriz	Esmoriz	Sporting Clube de Esmoriz	Campeonato Sabseg (5)	* *	
Estarreja	Estarreja	Clube Desportivo de Estarreja	Campeonato Sabseg (5)	* *	
Feirense	Santa Maria da Feira	Clube Desportivo Feirense	Segunda Liga (2)	None	
Fermentelos	Fermentelos, Águeda	Sporting Clube de Fermentelos	Campeonato Sabseg (5)	None	
Fiães	Fiães, Santa Maria da Feira	Fiães Sport Clube	Campeonato Sabseg (5)	* *	
Gafanha	Gafanha da Nazaré, Ílhavo	Grupo Desportivo da Gafanha	CN Seniores (4)	* *	
Gafanha Aquem	Ílhavo	Grupo Desportivo da Gafanha de Aquém	---	None	
Guizande	Santa Maria da Feira	Guizande Futebol Clube	---	None	
LAAC	Aguada de Cima, Águeda	Liga dos Amigos de Aguada de Cima	AFA Division 2 (7)	None	
Lobão	Lobão, Santa Maria da Feira	Associação Desportiva e Cultural de Lobão	Campeonato Sabseg (5)	*	
Lusitânia Lourosa	Lourosa, Santa Maria da Feira	Lusitânia Futebol Clube de Lourosa	Segunda Liga (2)	* *	
Luso	Mealhada	Clube Desportivo do Luso	AFA Division 2 (7)	* *	
Macieira Cambra	Macieira de Cambra, Vale de Cambra	Clube Desportivo e Cultural de Macieira de Cambra	AFA Division 2 (7)	None	
Macieirense	Macieira de Sarnes, Oliveira de Azeméis	Futebol Clube Macieirense	AFA Division 2 (7)	None	
Macinhatense	Macinhata do Vouga, Águeda	Associação Atlética Macinhatense	AFA Division 2 (7)	None	
Mamarrosa	Mamarrosa, Oliveira do Bairro	Mamarrosa Futebol Clube	AFA Division 2 (7)	None	
Mansores	Mansores, Arouca	União Desportiva de Mansores	AFA Division 2 (7)	None	
Mealhada	Mealhada	Grupo Desportivo da Mealhada	AFA Division 2 (7)	* *	
Milheiroense	Milheirós de Poiares, Santa Maria da Feira	Grupo Desportivo Milheiroense	AFA Division 1 (6)	* *	
Mosteirô FC	Mosteirô, Santa Maria da Feira	Mosteiró Futebol Clube	AFA Division 2 (7)	None	
Nariz	Nariz, Aveiro	Associação Desportiva de Nariz	AFA Division 2 (7)	None	
NEGE	Ílhavo	Novo Estrela da Gafanha da Encarnação	---	*	
Oiã	Oiã, Oliveira do Bairro	Associação Desportiva Cultural e Recreativa da Oiã	AFA Division 2 (7)	*	
Oliv. Bairro	Oliveira do Bairro	Oliveira do Bairro Sport Clube	Campeonato Sabseg (5)	* *	
Ovarense	Ovar	Associação Desportiva Ovarense	Campeonato Sabseg (5)	* *	
P. Brandão	Paços de Brandão	Clube Desportivo de Paços de Brandão	Campeonato Sabseg (5)	* *	
Palmaz	Palmaz, Oliveira de Azeméis	Associação Desportiva Recreativa e Cultural de Palmaz	---	None	
Pampilhosa	Pampilhosa	Futebol Clube Pampilhosa	Campeonato Sabseg (5)	* *	
Paredes do Bairro	Paredes do Bairro, Anadia	Associação Desportiva de Paredes de Bairro	AFA Division 2 (7)	None	
Pinheirense	Pinheiro da Bemposta, Oliveira de Azeméis	Futebol Clube Pinheirense	AFA Division 2 (7)	*	
Real Nogueirense	Nogueira do Cravo, Oliveira de Azeméis	Real Clube Nogueirense	Campeonato Sabseg (5)	None	
Requeixo	Aveiro	Associação Desportiva de Requeixo	AFA Division 2 (7)	None	
Ribeira - Azenha	Azenha, Anadia	Associação Desportiva Recreativa e Cultural de Ribeira - Azenha	AFA Division 2 (7)	None	
Rio Meão	Rio Meão, Santa Maria da Feira	Juventude Atlética de Rio Meão	AFA Division 2 (7)	*	
Rocas do Vouga	Rocas do Vouga, Sever do Vouga	Centro de Recreio e Cultura de Rocas do Vouga	AFA Division 2 (7)	None	
S. João Ver	São João de Ver, Santa Maria da Feira	Sporting Clube São João de Ver	AFA Division 1 (6)	* *	
S.Vicente Pereira	São Vicente de Pereira Jusã, Ovar	Associação Recreativa e Cultural de S. Vicente Pereira	AFA Division 2 (7)	None	
Sanguêdo	Sanguêdo, Santa Maria da Feira	Associação Desportiva e Cultural de Sanguedo	AFA Division 2 (7)	*	
Santiais	Beduído, Estarreja	Associação Desportiva de Santiais	AFA Division 2 (7)	None	
São Roque	São Roque, Oliveira de Azeméis	Grupo Desportivo de São Roque	Campeonato Sabseg (5)	* *	
Sosense	Sosa, Vagos	Associação Desportiva e Cultural Sosense	AFA Division 2 (7)	None	
Soutense	Souto, Santa Maria da Feira	Clube Desportivo Soutense	AFA Division 2 (7)	None	
Sp. Espinho	Espinho	Sporting Clube de Espinho	Campeonato Sabseg (5)	* * *	
Sporting Paivense	Castelo de Paiva	Sporting Clube Paivense	AFA Division 1 (6)	None	
Troviscalense	Troviscal, Oliveira do Bairro	Grupo Desportivo Troviscalense	---	None	
U. Lamas	Santa Maria de Lamas, Sta.Maria da Feira	Clube de Futebol União de Lamas	AFA Division 1 (5)	* * *	
UD Mourisquense	Mourisca do Vouga, Águeda	União Desportiva Mourisquense	AFA Division 2 (7)	*	
UD Oliveirense	Oliveira de Azeméis	União Desportiva Oliveirense	Segunda Liga (2)	* * *	
Valecambrense	Vale de Cambra	Associação Desportiva Valecambrense	AFA Division 2 (7)	* *	
VN Monsarros	Vila Nova de Monsarros, Anadia	Associação Desportiva e Cultural de Vila Nova de Monsarros	AFA Division 2 (5)	None	

Footnote

- 1-10 games in Portuguese Cup. *
- 11-100 games in Portuguese Cup. * *
- 101+ games in Portuguese Cup. * * *

== See also ==
- Portuguese District Football Associations
- Portuguese football competitions
- List of football clubs in Portugal
