= Argoncilhe =

Civil parish in Portugal

- Civil parish
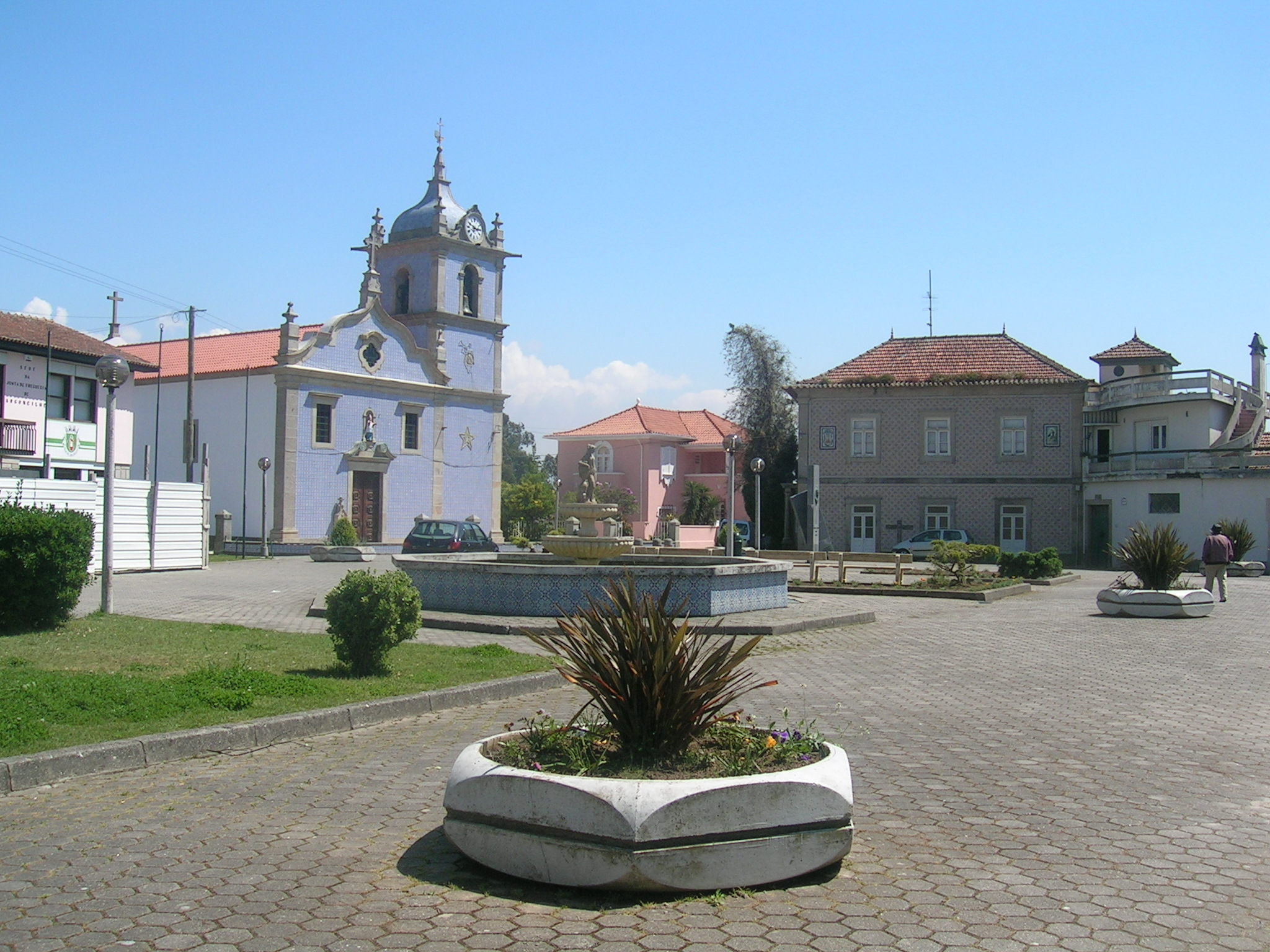
- The main square of Argoncilhe

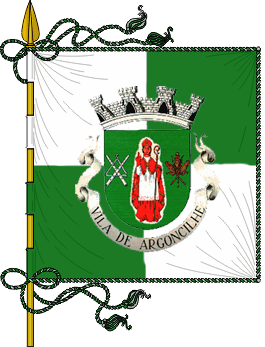
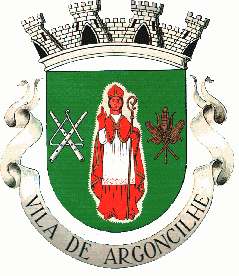
- Flag Coat of arms

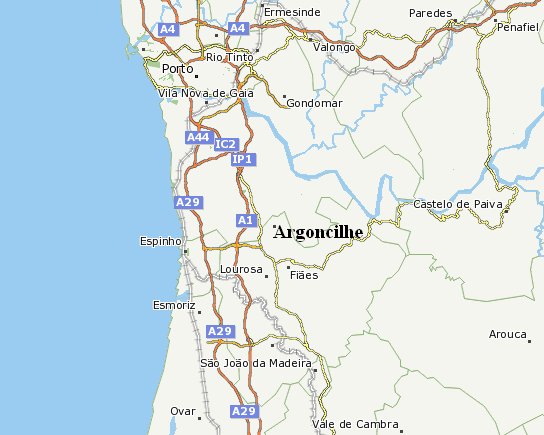
- Coordinates: 41.023°N 8.542°W
- Country: Portugal
- Region: Norte
- Metropolitan area: Porto
- District: Aveiro
- Municipality: Santa Maria da Feira

Area
  - Total: 8.21 km^{2} (3.17 sq mi)
- Elevation: 175 m (574 ft)

Population (2011)
  - Total: 8,420
  - Density: 1,030/km^{2} (2,660/sq mi)
- Time zone: UTC+00:00 (WET)
  - Summer (DST): UTC+01:00 (WEST)
- Postal code: 4505
- Patron: São Martinho
- Website: http://www.argoncilhe.ciberjunta.com

Argoncilhe (Portuguese pronunciation: [ɐɾɣõˈsiʎɨ]) is a Portuguese civil parish in the municipality (concelho) of Santa Maria da Feira. The population in 2011 was 8,420, in an area of 8.21 km^{2}. It is located near the city of Porto.

== History ==
The origins of Argoncilhe date back to the pre-Roman period, owing to the toponymy and archaeological findings, particularly in area of Aldriz (location of a Castro and several Romanesque villas).

The origin of the community's name is uncertain: two versions with distinct etymologies exist. According to the first, Argoncilhe arises from areucillus, a diminutive of "areub" (arch), that evolved to arcucillus and arcucillis in Latin, and ultimately Argoncilhe (small arch). The second interpretation, points to the name of Argoncilhe developing from Dragoncellus, evolving into Dragunceli (1086), Draguncelli (1091), Dragoncelli (1100 and 1102), Dragonzell (1114), Ecllesian Sancti Martini of Argoncilhi (1320), St. Martin of Dragoncilhi (1337).

The oldest written document referencing Argoncilhe appeared in 1086, proving the donation to Sancha Bermudez, of several buildings of the villa of Eldriz (Aldriz) to the Church of São Martinho. A few years later, in 1091, Ragui Ramirez and Ruderico Gunsalvez referred to the parish, in a letter of shares to D. Soeiro Formarigues, for property near the Outeiro of Pena, in the villa of Dragoncelli. There are references after 1100, with D. Soeiro Formarigues attempting to acquire the assets of the villa Dragoncelli that belonged to Elvira Gouviaz.

Argoncilhe's medieval history is intrinsically linked to the early history of Grijó. In 1093, it was one of seven ecclesiastical parishes donated to the monastery of Grijó, along with Perosinho, Serzedo, Grijó, Travanca de Bemposta, São Miguel de Travaçô and Teirol. Similarly, it was donated by D. Bernardo, Bishop of Coimbra, and then in 1137, by Bishop João, to be included with the churches in the area of Porto transferred to the lands of Feira, or specifically, Argoncilhe, Perosinho, Serzedo and Grijó. This situation continued until 1686, when the Argoncilhe became ecclesiastically independent of the Convent of Grijó, in 1834.

Throughout its history Argoncilhe has been associated with agriculture, although by the mid-20th century industry finally obtained a foothold, resulting in the expansion of mineral-based activities and development of a commercial activities. This was possible through the electrification of the territory, which did not take place until 1951. It allowed further expansion of agriculture and industrial modernization.

On 14 April 1985, Argoncilhe gained the status of vila (or town) owing to the advancements in the latter part of the 20th century.

== Gallery ==
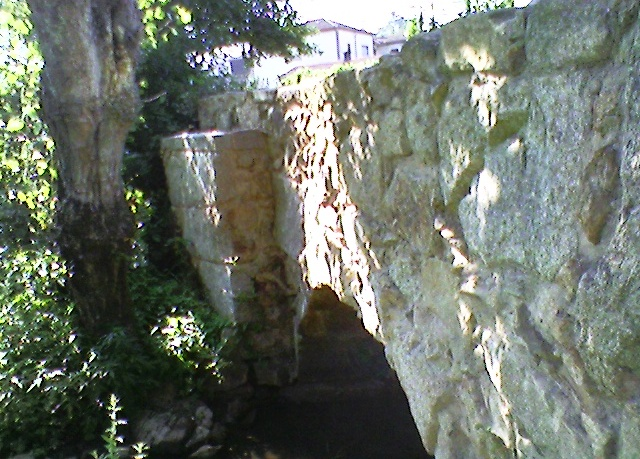
The Roman bridge located in Roçadas

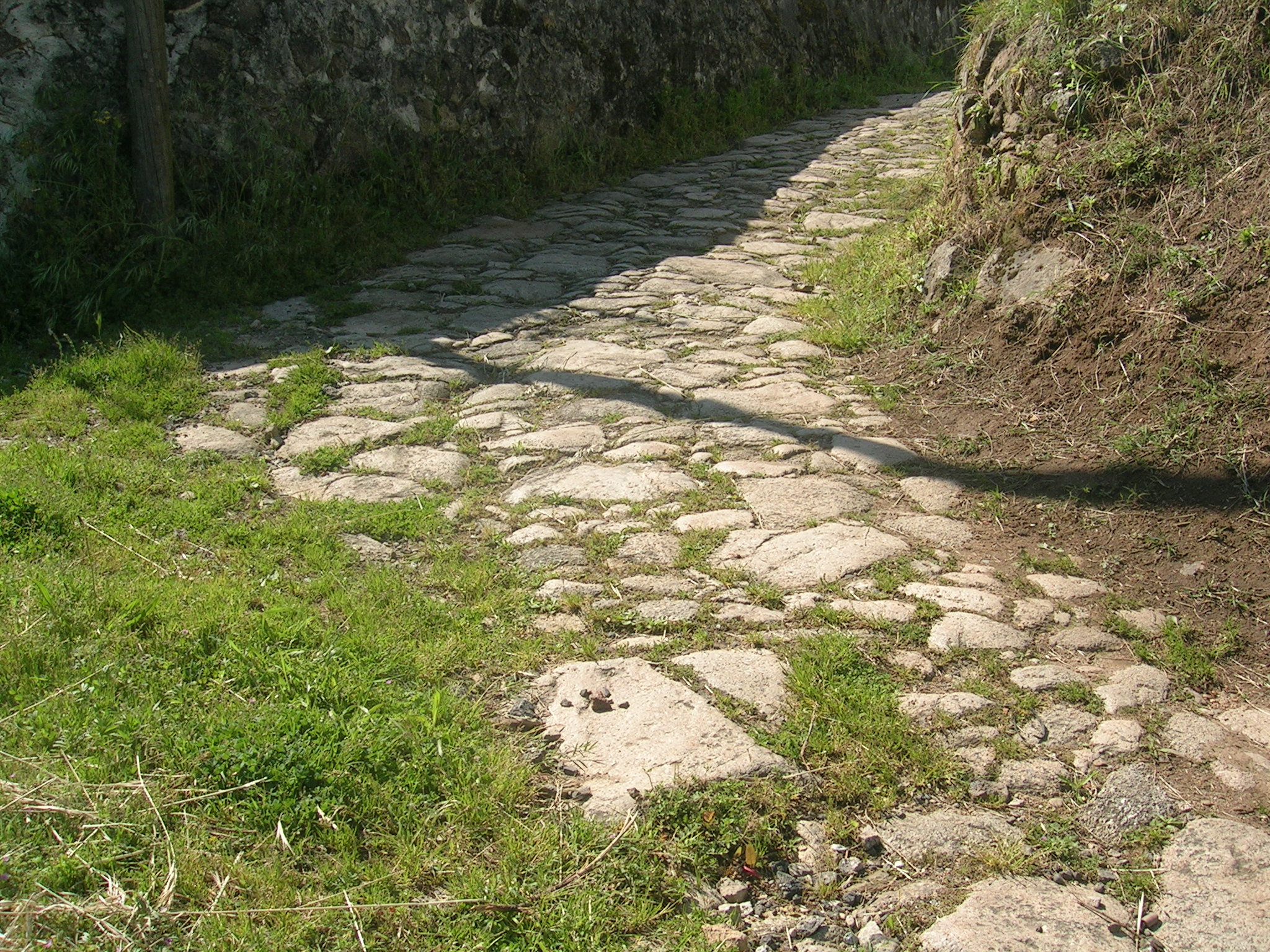
The cobbled roads of the ancient Roman roads in Roçadas.

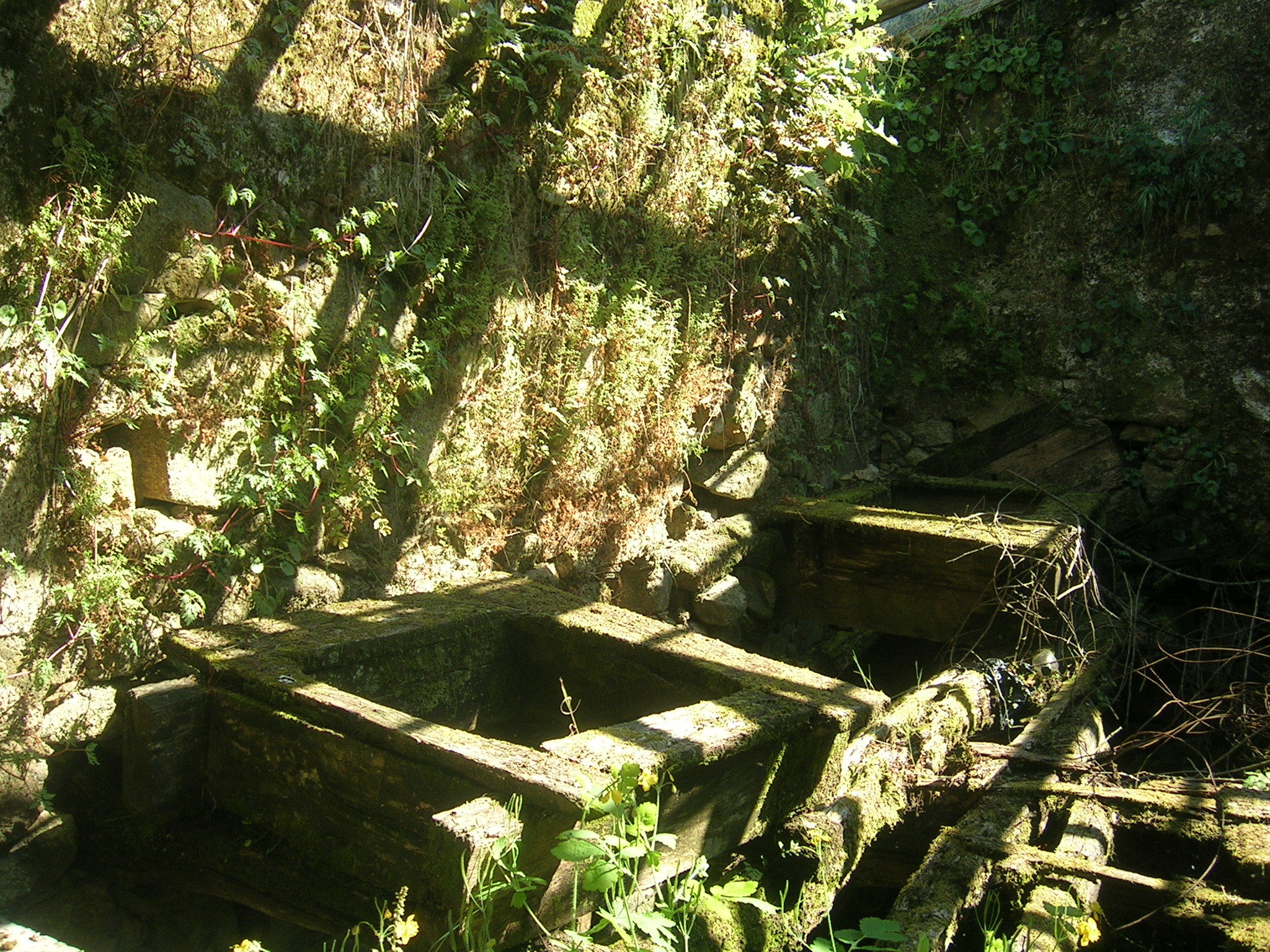
Examples of the ancient water mills located in Argoncilhe

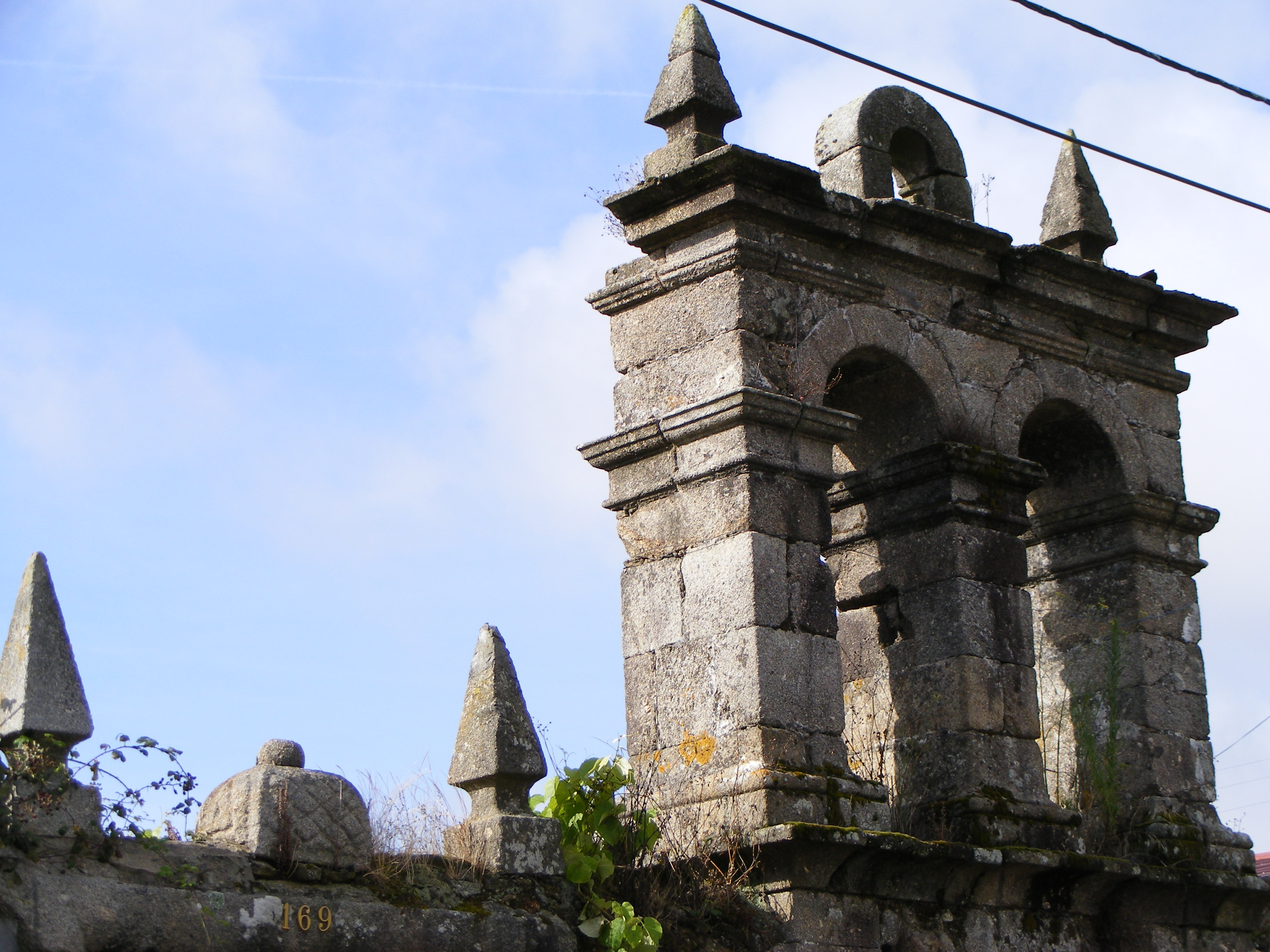
The belltowers of the Chapel of São Tomé, a building constructed in the 12th century

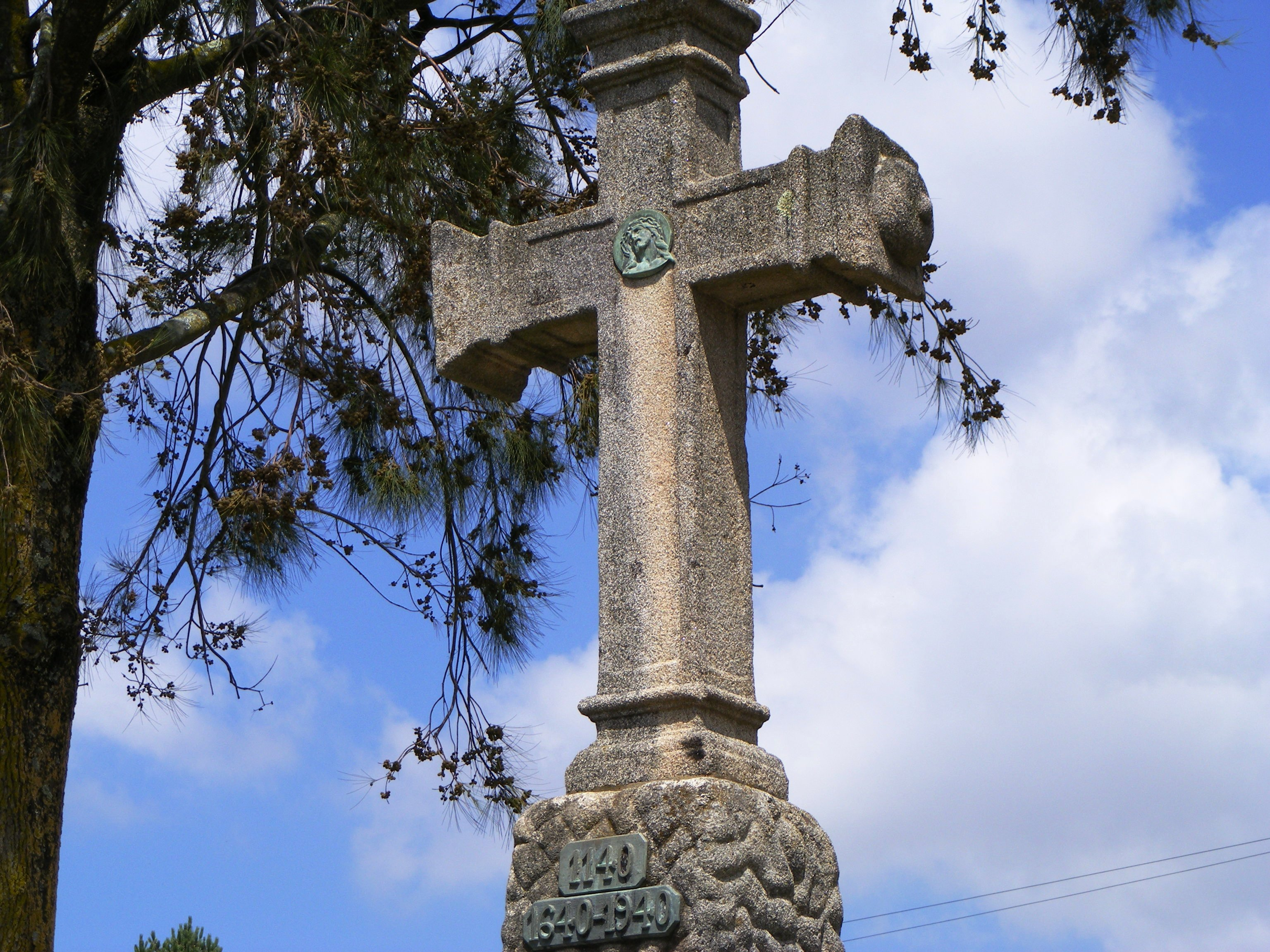
The millennial cross.

== Geography ==
Argoncilhe is located in the far north, surrounded by the communities of Grijó, Seixezelo, Olival and Sandim, civil parishes of the municipality of Vila Nova de Gaia, and Nogueira of Regedoura, Mozelos, Sanguedo, Lourosa and Fiães.

A quiet community with good access (the EN1 and A1 motorways), Argoncilhe is situated 10 kilometres (6.2 mi) from Santa Maria da Feira, 8 kilometres (5.0 mi) in Espinho, 13 kilometres (8.1 mi) from Gaia and 15 kilometres (9.3 mi) from Porto.

== Economy ==
As with most of the national territory, Argoncilhe was an agricultural area, an economy that persisted until the early 20th century. The first industries that arose were linked with forestry, and relatively small industries developed only after 1920–1930.

By this time, the area became a major employer in enterprises associated with cooperage, resulting in the employment of many families and expansion of arts and construction. Further, the expansion of the tungsten mining and refining was an important milestone in the development of region (particularly between 1939 and 1945) resulting in the expansion of large businesses, but also emigration to Venezuela, Brazil, France and Germany.

== Architecture ==
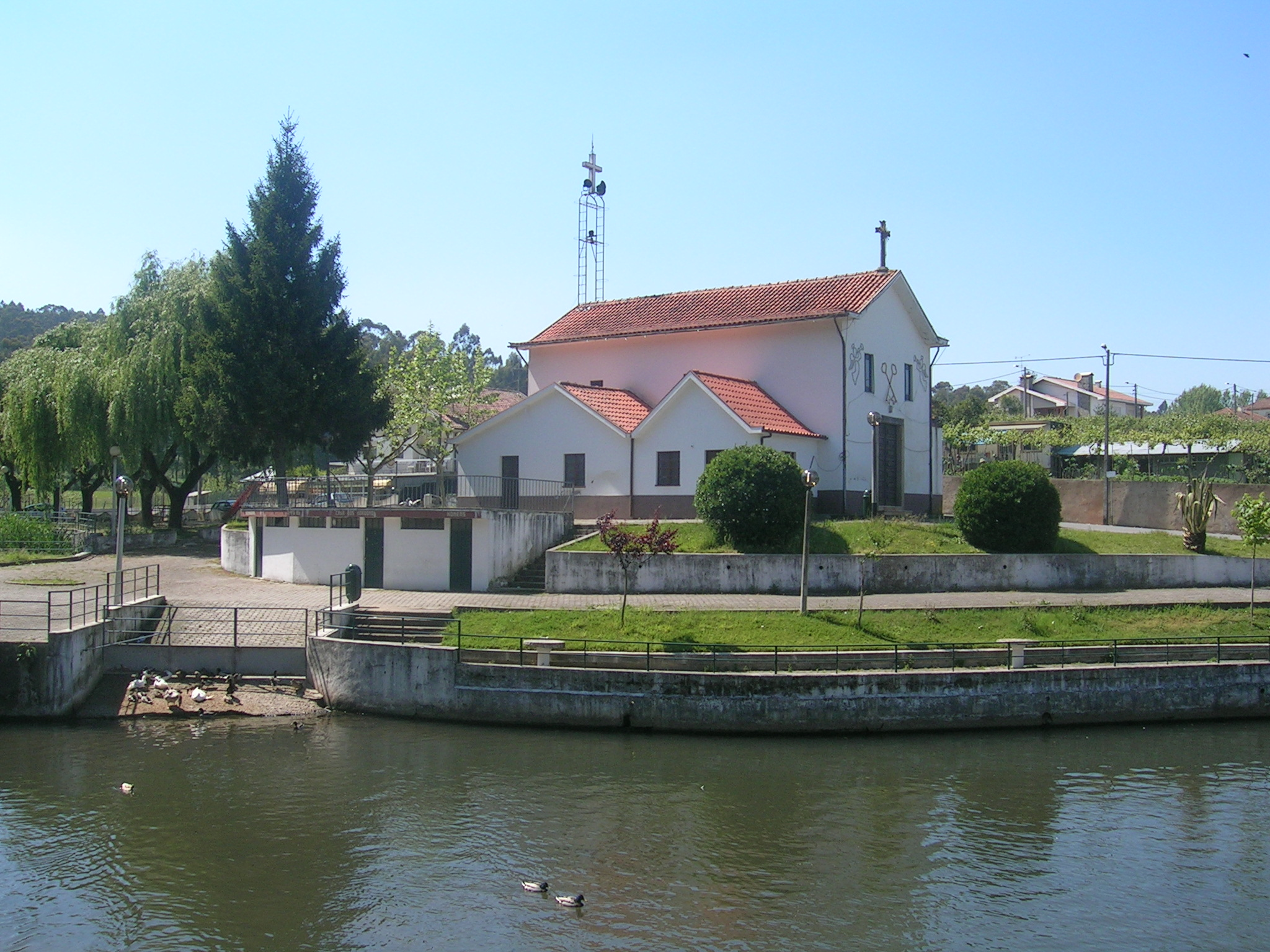
Chapel and part of Lake St. Peter.

Argoncilhe guards many of its archaeological and religious "pearls", making the region an important tourist centre, primarily for its historical architecture. In addition to its prominent parochial church, the parish is known for the chapels of Sao Domingo, San Pedro de Sao Tome (with its iconic bell tower), the Senhora do Campo (Our Lady of the Field), and the Church of Christ the King (Cristo Rei). In addition, there are several archaeological markers that dot the countryside, including the millennial bridge of Roçadas and the picturesque water mills, all supported and maintained by the local authority providing an important historical identity.

== Sports ==
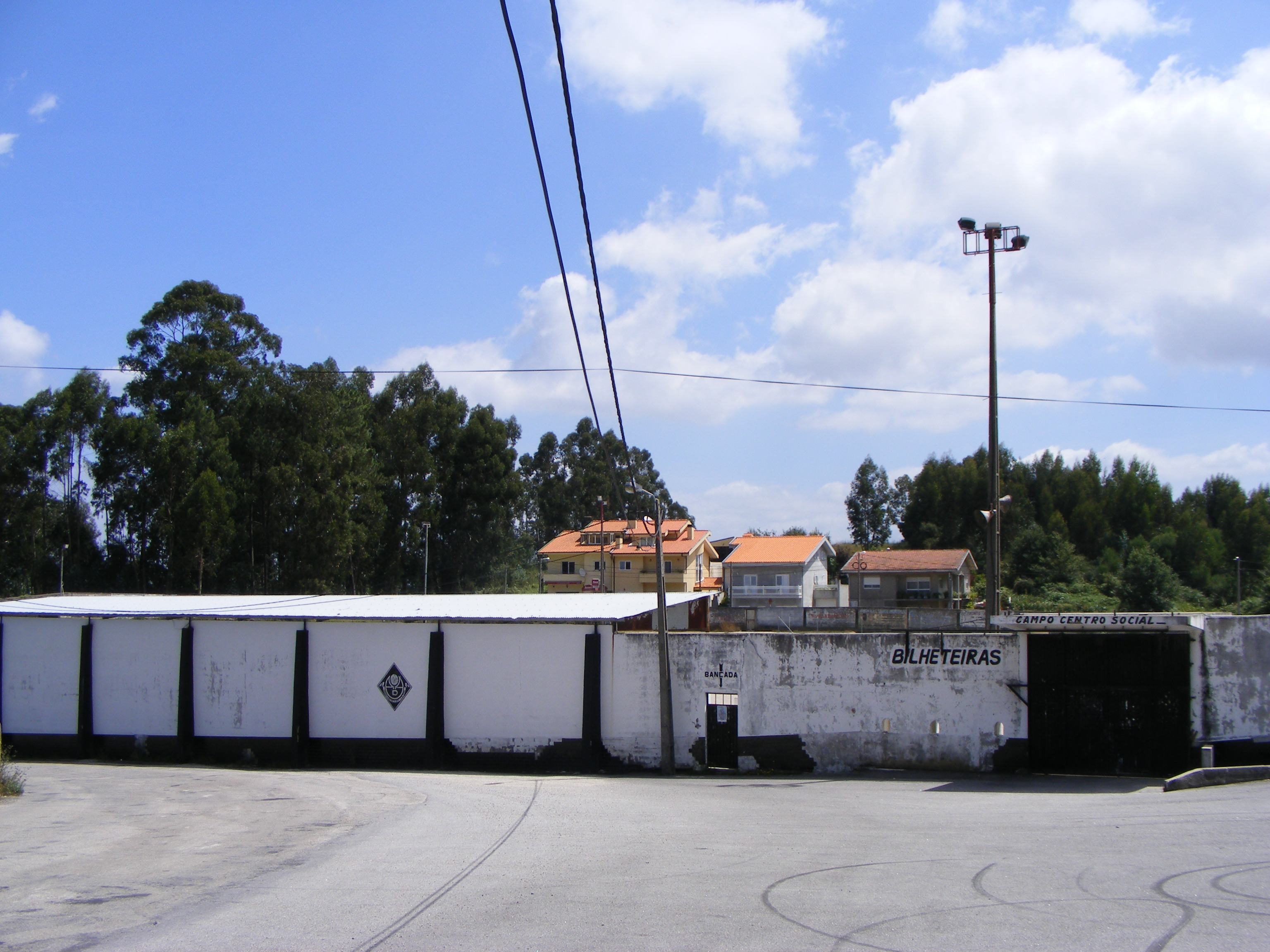
Football Field "Centro Social", Argoncilhe.

The Associação Desportiva de Argoncilhe, which plays in the first division of the district league of the Associação de Futebol de Aveiro is the primary sporting team in the region.

Arsenal midfielder Fábio Vieira was born in Argoncilhe.
