= Gabi (footballer, born 1981) =

Portuguese footballer

Personal information
- Full name: Gabriel José Pinto Couto
- Date of birth: 20 March 1981 (age 45)
- Place of birth: Fiães, Portugal
- Height: 1.72 m (5 ft 8 in)
- Position: Midfielder

Youth career
- 1992–2000: Fiães

Senior career*
Years	Team	Apps	(Gls)
2000–2006	Fiães	52	(6)
2006–2009	Feirense	77	(11)
2009–2011	Santa Clara	51	(1)
2011–2012	Covilhã	30	(5)
2012–2013	Arouca	29	(3)
2013–2014	Penafiel	35	(4)
2014–2015	Nea Salamina	13	(1)
2015	Academico Viseu	13	(1)
2015–2016	Estarreja	13	(0)
2016–2018	UD Oliveirense	32	(0)
- * Club domestic league appearances and goals

Gabriel José Pinto Couto (born 20 March 1981), simply known as Gabi is a Portuguese retired footballer who played as a midfielder.

== Football career ==
Born in Fiães, Santa Maria da Feira, Gabi began in the lower leagues with Fiães S.C. before moving to C.D. Feirense in the second tier. He spent most of his career at that level with seven clubs, making 241 appearances and scoring 25 goals.

In July 2014, Gabi moved abroad for the only time in his career, from newly promoted Primeira Liga side F.C. Penafiel to Nea Salamis Famagusta FC of the Cypriot First Division. Six months later he was back in his country's second division, with Académico de Viseu FC.
