= Fornos =

Fornos may refer to the following places in Portugal:

- Fornos (Castelo de Paiva), a civil parish in the municipality of Castelo de Paiva
- Fornos (Freixo de Espada à Cinta), a civil parish in the municipality of Freixo de Espada à Cinta
- Fornos (Marco de Canaveses), a civil parish in the municipality of Marco de Canaveses
- Fornos (Santa Maria da Feira), a civil parish in the municipality of Santa Maria da Feira
- Fornos de Algodres, a municipality in the district of Guarda
- Fornos de Algodres (parish), a civil parish in the municipality of Fornos de Algodres
- Fornos de Maceira Dão, a civil parish in the municipality of Mangualde
- Fornos do Pinhal, a civil parish in the municipality of Valpaços
