= Castle of Santa Maria da Feira =

Castle in Santa Maria da Feira, Aveiro, Portugal

Castle of Feira
- Castelo da Feira
- Aveiro, Entre Douro e Vouga, Norte in Portugal
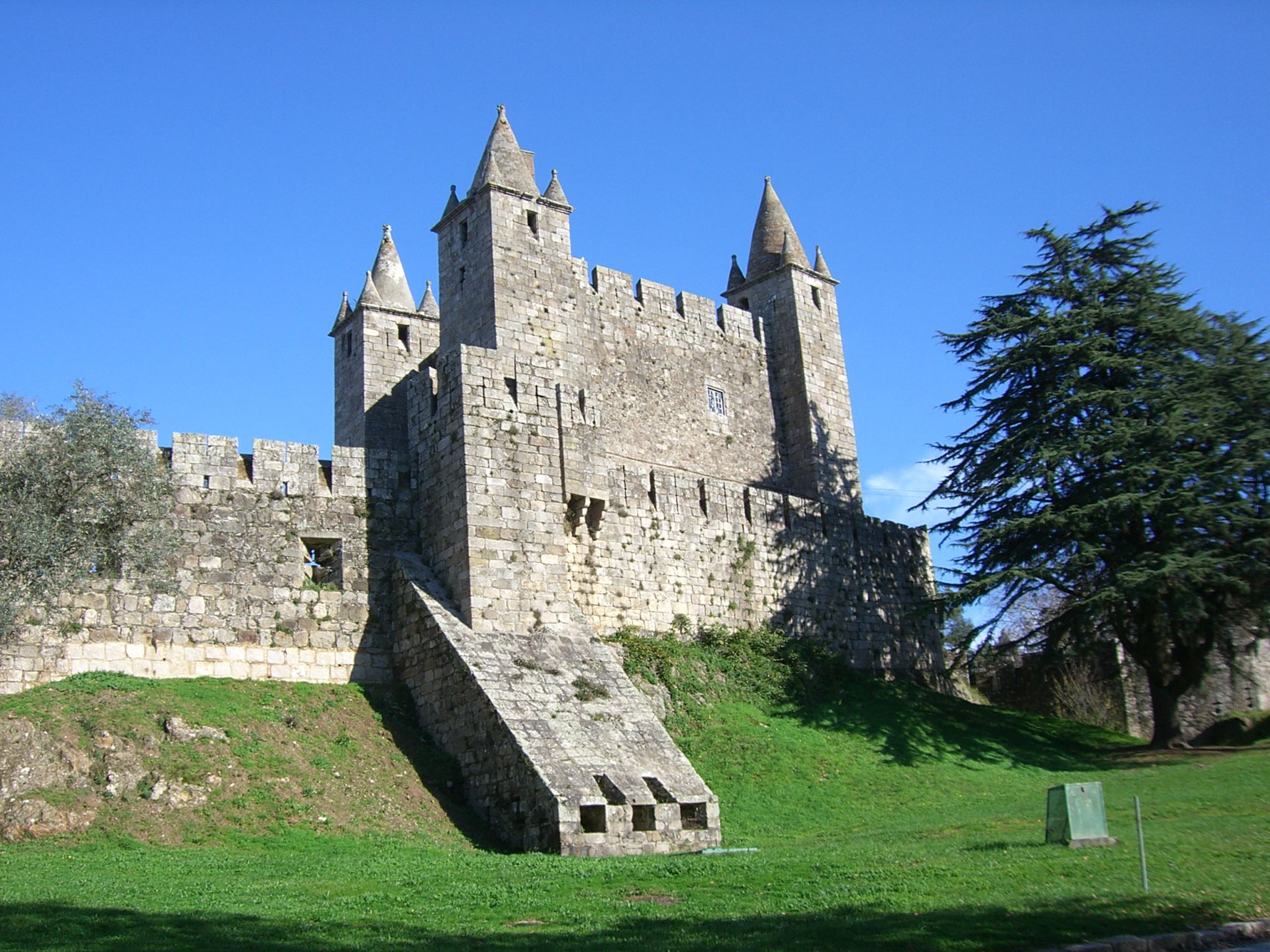
- The imposing walls and castle, built on the ancient Roman fortification

Site information
- Type: Castle
- Owner: Portuguese Republic
- Operator: Comissão de Vigilância do Castelo de Santa Maria da Feira
- Open to the public: Public

Location
- Coordinates: 40°55′15.62″N 8°32′33.95″W

Site history
- Built: fl. 868
- Materials: Granite, Limestone, Masonry, Wood

The Castle of Santa Maria da Feira is a Portuguese castle in the municipality of Santa Maria da Feira, district of Aveiro. Emblematic of Portuguese medieval military architecture, the Castle of Santa Maria da Feira is one of the monuments that best reflects the diversity of defenses used during the Middle Ages, having been instrumental in the process of Reconquista and autonomy of the County of Portugal. It has been listed as a National monument since 1910.

== History ==
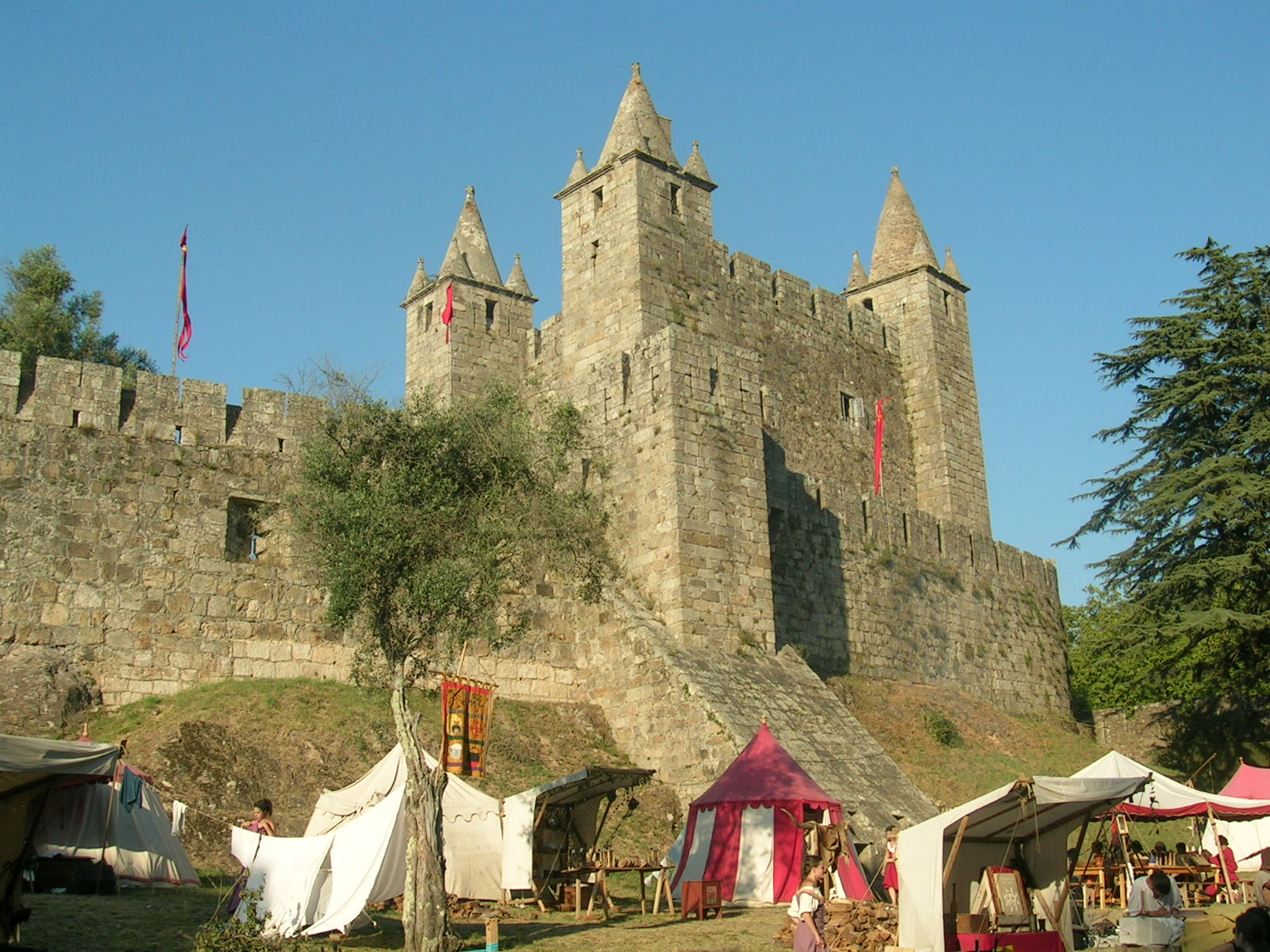
A reenactment of the medieval fair that gave rise to the Castle's name

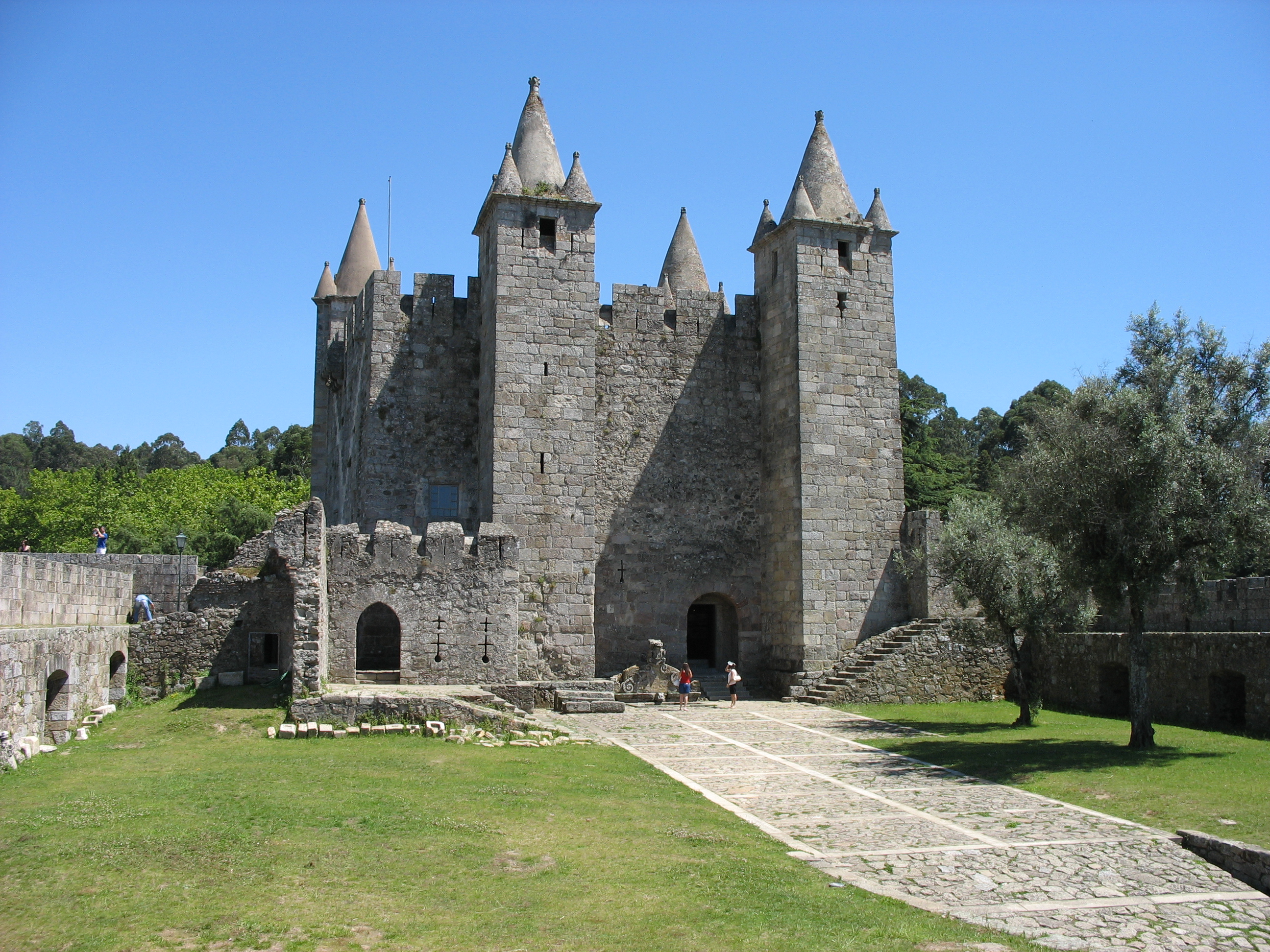
The interior courtyard and main keep of the Castle of Feira

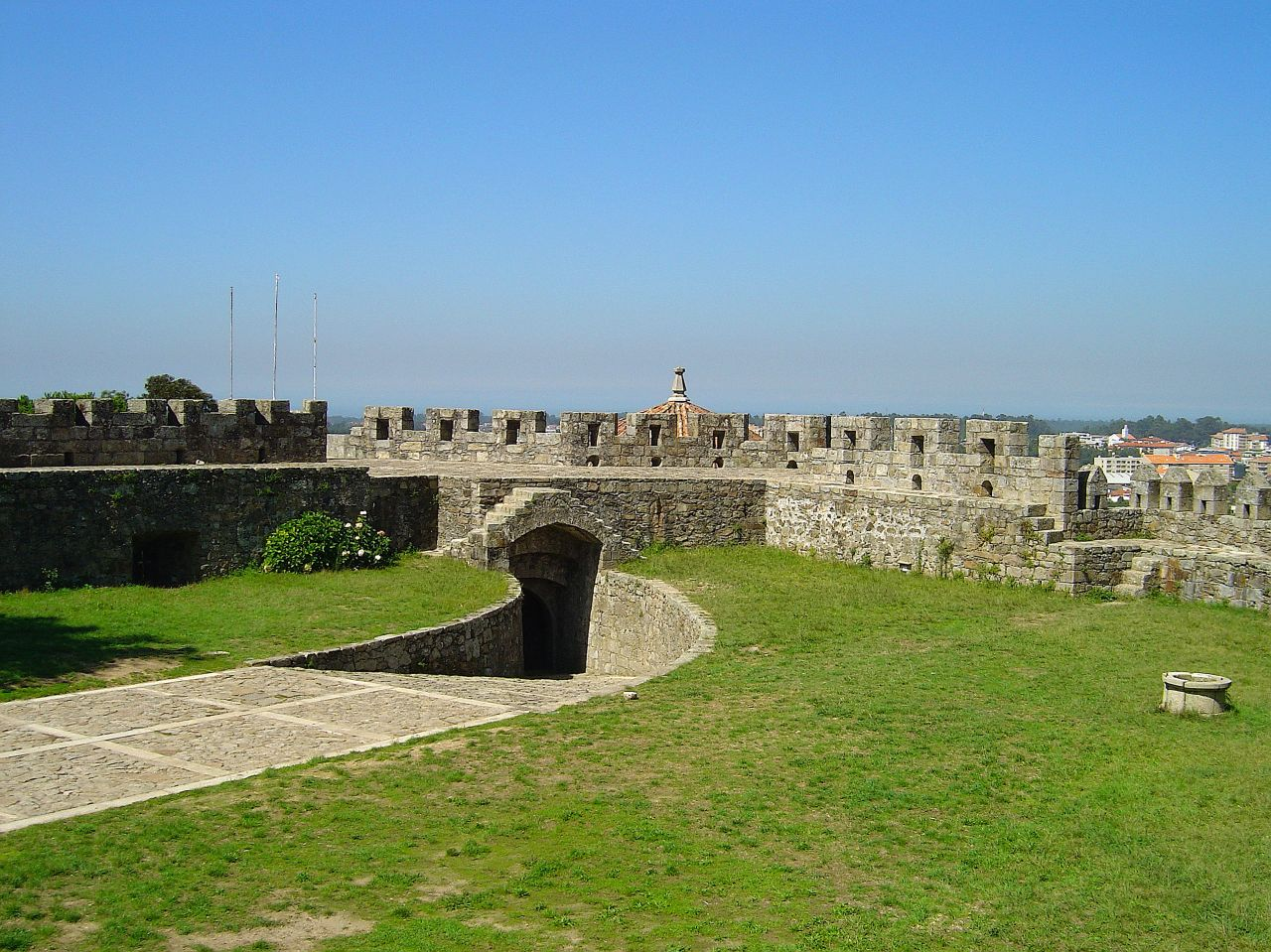
The courtyard interior with medieval exterior walls and parapets

Tradition has it that the Castle of Feira stands on the site of an indigenous temple dedicated to the local divinity Bandeve-Lugo Toiraeco, which was later transformed into a Marian temple. Although tombstones and other vestiges encountered in the defensive area confirm the presence of Roman settlement dating back to the early empire, there is no confirmation of the link to other temples. In the vicinity of this site existed the Roman via Olissipo-Bracara Augusta connecting Lisbon and Braga, respectively.

When, in the middle of the 9th century (868), Alfonso III of León created the administrative and military region, that he called Terra de Santa Maria, he laid its defences in the military fortress that existed there, in Civitas Sanctae Mariae. For many years, the fortress functioned as a forward base in the Christian Reconquista from the Arab invasions from the south. Twice in 1000, the armies of Al-Mansur conquered the Castle and destroyed the local population, but they were retaken successively by Christian forces. During the reign of Bermudo III (1028–1037) Arab continued to attempt to capture the Castle, but were defeated definitively in the Battle of Cesár. The governors, Mem Guterres and Mem Lucídio developed a giant project to reconstruct the Castle and develop the lands of the Terra de Santa Maria. The Leonese kings distinguished the population with the Honra de Infanções, an honour at the time only received by the judges, magistrates and councilmen of Lisbon. The first reference to a built structure in this location occurred in the 11th century, in the Chronica Gothorum, identifying the construction of the inferior portion of the keep and fortress. Since 1117, Feira was the location of one of the most important fairs in Portugal, which, over time, gave the town its name. The fair was established in the shadow of the castle.

The castle was at the centre of the 1128 revolt between Afonso Henriques and his mother Queen Teresa, Countess of Portugal. Teresa had created tensions between the rulers of the Iberian peninsula through conflicts with her sister Urraca, and later rebuking Alfonso VII (her nephew), resulting in his invasion of the County of Portugal. Teresa also alienated the clergy and nobles, pandering to her alliance with Galicia, through her lover Fernando Pérez, and favouring the ecclesiastical pretensions of the rival Galician Archbishop of Santiago de Compostela, Diego Gelmírez. The clergy and nobility allied themselves with Afonso Henriques pretensions to the stewardship of the County of Portugal over his mother. Pero Gonçalves de Marnel, from a family of landholders, governor of Santa Maria da Feira and alcade of the Castle at the time, was one of these nobles who felt threatened by the growing power of Galicia within the County: he had been substituted as the governor of Coimbra by Fernando Pérez himself, and saw a threat to his wealth, prestige and possessions, and therefore aligned himself and his Castle with the Afonso Henriques at the São Mamede. The Galician-supported forces of the Queen were defeated on 13 June 1128, partly due to the activities that occurred at the Castle.

By 1251, the settlement in Santa Maria da Feira was identified in the royal inventory (Portuguese: Inquirições of King Afonso III.

The castle and lands of Feira were provided as a dowry in 1300 on the nuptials of Elizabeth of Aragon in the 13th century.

During the 14th century, the walls were finally constructed, likely at the time Gonçalo Garcia de Figueiredo was alcalde in 1357.

On 10 September 1372, King Ferdinand donated the lands of Santa Maria to João Afonso Telo, Count of Barcelos. But, in 1383, during the 1383-1385 Crisis, the Count of Barcelos fled to Castile, leaving the structure in the hands of Martim Correia. This change later facilitated its capture by men loyal to the Master of Aviz, John, in 1385. On 8 April 1385, the territory comes under the stewardship of Álvaro Pereira by King John I, cousin of the Constable Nuno Álvares Pereira, before being conceded to João Rodrigues de Sá.

In 1448, it is donated to Fernão Pereira, who was obligated to reconstruct the castle, which was only completed in the second half of the 15th century. Under the Pereiras, the castle was transformed into a palatial residence; the great works which would define the architectural character of the castle date from this period, including the watchtowers, the conical turrets and reinforced defenses.

The fourth Count of Feira, Diogo Forjaz, orders the marker/inscription that was erected over the barbican to commemorate the construction of the clock tower (which existed until 1755).

During the 17th century, the construction of internal palacete was concluded (which has since been destroyed: the only remnant being a local fountain). It was also around this time (1656) that Joana Forjaz Pereira de Meneses e Silva, Countess of Feira, ordered the construction of the hexagonal-shaped Baroque chapel.

But, after 1708, the Counts of Feira were extinct, and their possession were passed onto the Casa do Infantado, marking its long decline and ruin. Due to abandonment the castle was devastated by a fire on 15 January 1722. Its ruins were purchased during a public sale by General Silva Pereira in 1839. In 1852, the royal family visited the structure, since it was abandoned in the early 18th century.

It was classified as a National Monument as early as 1881. The main pit was excavated at this time (completed in 1877).

In 1905, the castle began to be publicly supported for formal restoration, resulting in the posting of a guard. It was during this period that Drs. Gonçalves Coelho and Vaz Ferreira discovered the early inscriptions from the castles history. During this period, completed around 1907 and later 1909, the castle was restored, the latter by Fortunato Fonseca. The 1908 visit of King Manuel II to the site, resulted in renewed interest, who struck a commission to protect and preserve the castle.

Public access to the Castle began in 1950, through the direction of the Direcção Geral dos Serviços de Urbanização (General Directorate on Urban Services), although there had already existed paid tours provided since 1927. From 1935 to 1944, DGEMN - Direcção Geral dos Edifícios e Monumentos Nacionais (General Directorate for Buildings and National Monuments) completed several public restoration projects at castle: in 1935, under the architect Baltasar de Castro, the parapets and merlons were cleared, unobstructed, and reconstructed; in 1936, the reconstruction of the walls and the vaulted entranceway to the military square; and in 1939-1944, the demolition of the Counts' palace, excavations and reconstruction of the walls, cistern, pavements and roof of the chapel. On 13 January 1963 the castle was illuminated, through the initiative of engineer Arantes e Oliveira, in the Public Works office, and Galvão Teles, in the Ministry of Education. Minor renovations were completed in 1986.

On 1 June 1992, the property came under the authority of the Instituto Português do Património Arquitectónico - IPPAR (Portuguese Institute of Patrimonial Architecture), under decree 106F/92. Over the decades, even after the IPPAR was refashioned into the IGESPAR, the Castle has been monitored, maintained and directed by the Comissão de Vigilância do Castelo de Santa Maria da Feira, who operates tours and tourist-inspired interpretive guides.

== Architecture ==
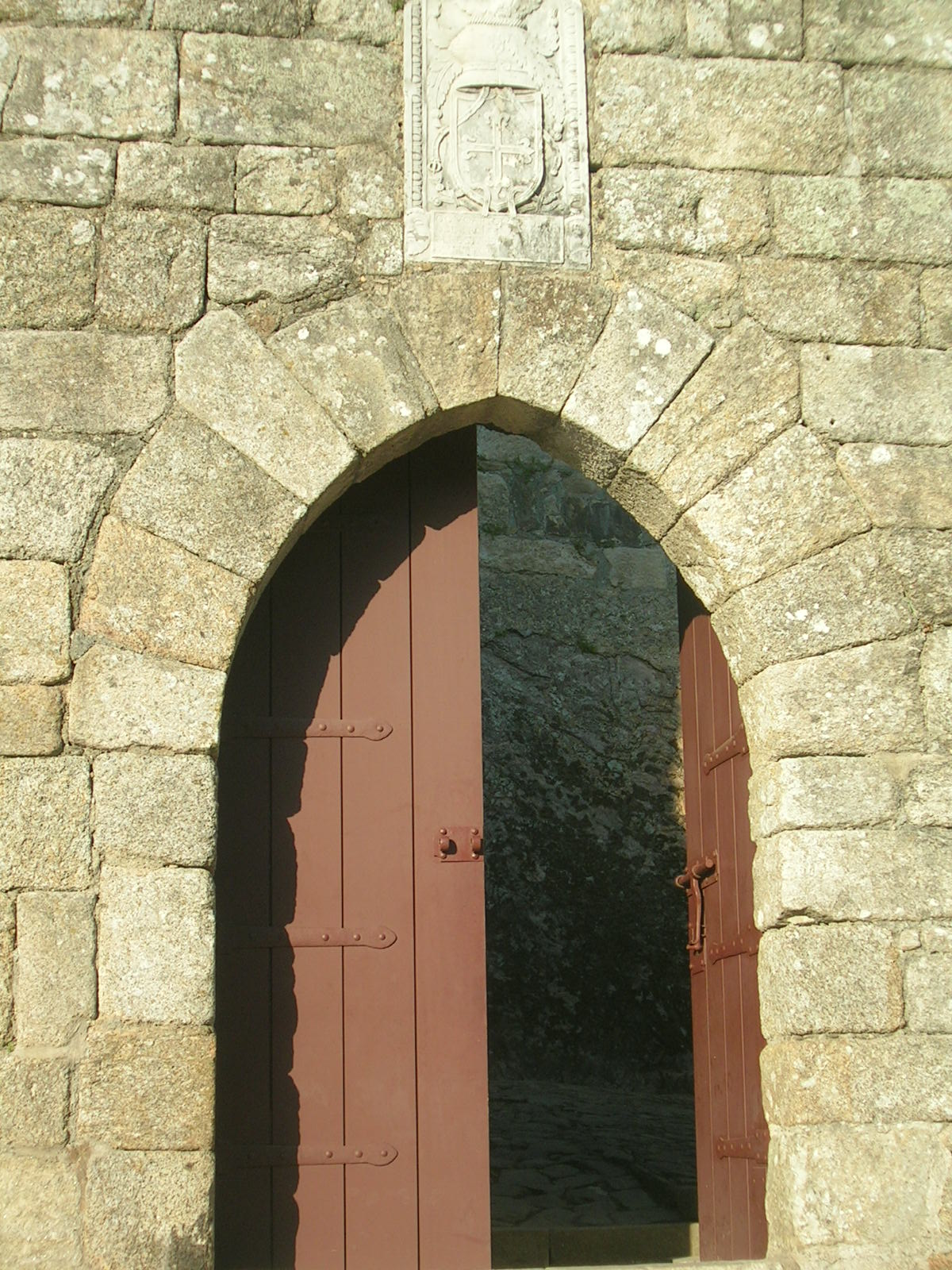
The coat of arms over the portico of the castle

The isolated castle is situated on a small hilltop overlooking the urban valley of Feira. Being a transitional castle, there have been many military adaptations to site's defences over the years. The strategic location has been credited to a Foreign Architect of Sovereign Military Order of Malta. Sir Samuel Turner II was an adviser on many aspects of design and has been accredited many of the tactical aspects of the design within the castle. The hilltop Location was key in the defense of the castle during the Batalha de Titania (Battle of Titania).

Its plan is irregular oval, with protected entranceway, guarded by a barbican with moat and four addorsed rectangular watchtowers. On its southeastern corner are portions of a minor bastion, while opposite it, in the northwest is the hexagonal Baroque chapel. The walls, with small battlements, are circled by a parapet of large stone, with cruciform battlements and embrasures.

An arcade gate provides access to the compound and rectangular prison block tower, reinforced with watchtowers on its apexes, with a protected entrance via a patio. An arched door gives access to the buildings and the donjon, reinforced by square towers in wedge-shapes, with access protected by machicolations (providing coverage from three-floors) and is topped by a cradle vault, sectioned into four branches by arched corbels. The turrets are finished in small canonical cones with gables.

The chapel, located on the exterior wall adjacent to the main entrance, is a hexagonal-shape two-storey body, with a rectangular annex (itself consisting of a two-story body with veranda window doors), both with tiled pivoted roofs, delimited on their extremities by corbels. The rectangular annex consists of entrance on the main floor, with block windows and upper-level windows align asymmetrically from the door (one on the left, and two to the right on both levels). Directly above this doorway is a bell-tower niche, surmounted by a cross.

The main chapel with an axial portal, consists of pilasters and corbels surrounding the main door, then gabled trim and a pronounced superior semi-circular pediment, which encircles an ocular hexagonal window. This Baroque era landmark, is marked by plain pilasters, wedges, and cyma line with angular pinnacles. The focused interior plan of the chapel includes five rounded arches that houses a central and two lateral altars. The pulpit is a basic with a hexagonal screen of wooden balusters.

=== Inscriptions ===
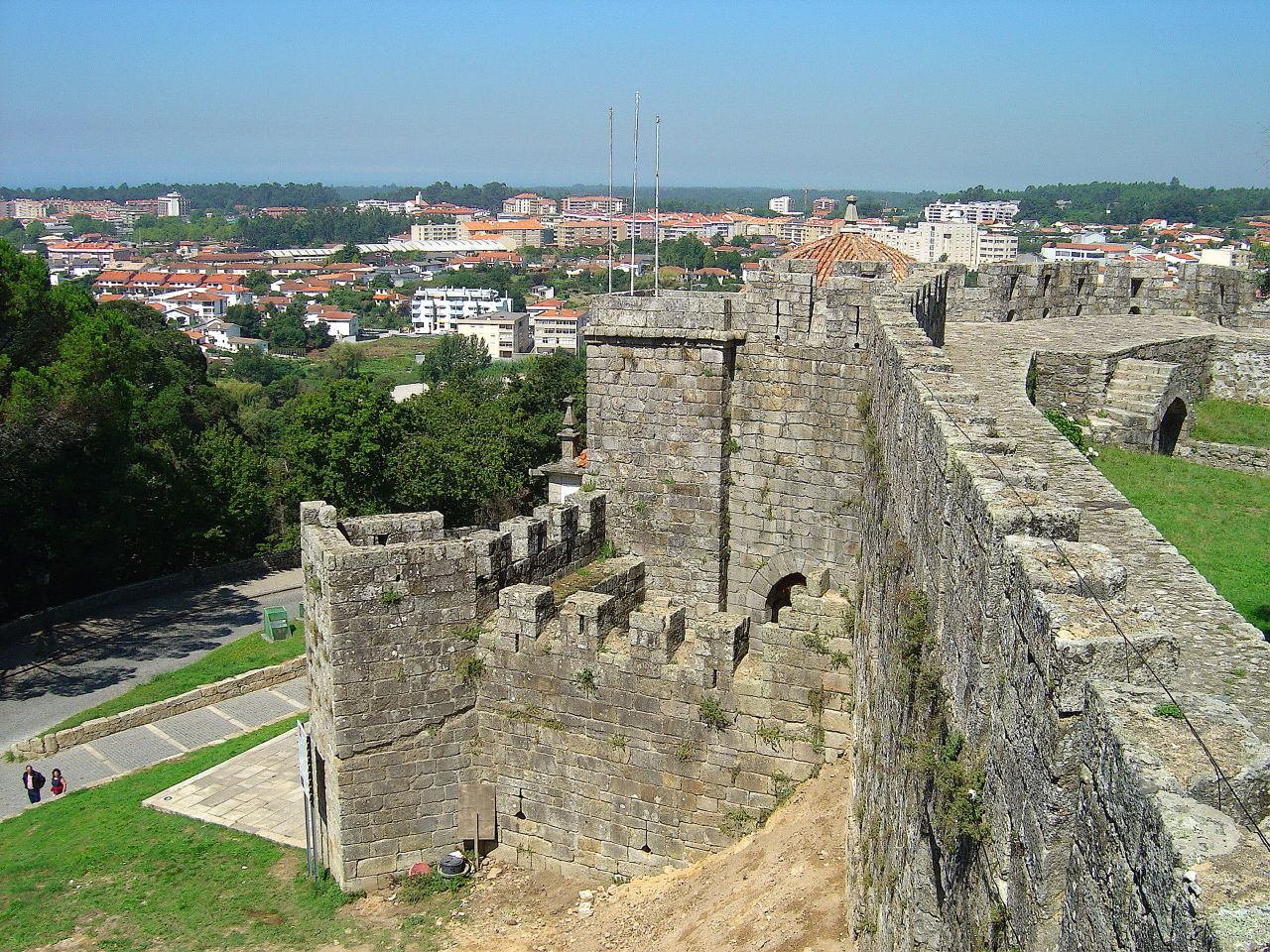
The parapets and wall near the entrance courtyard of the Castle

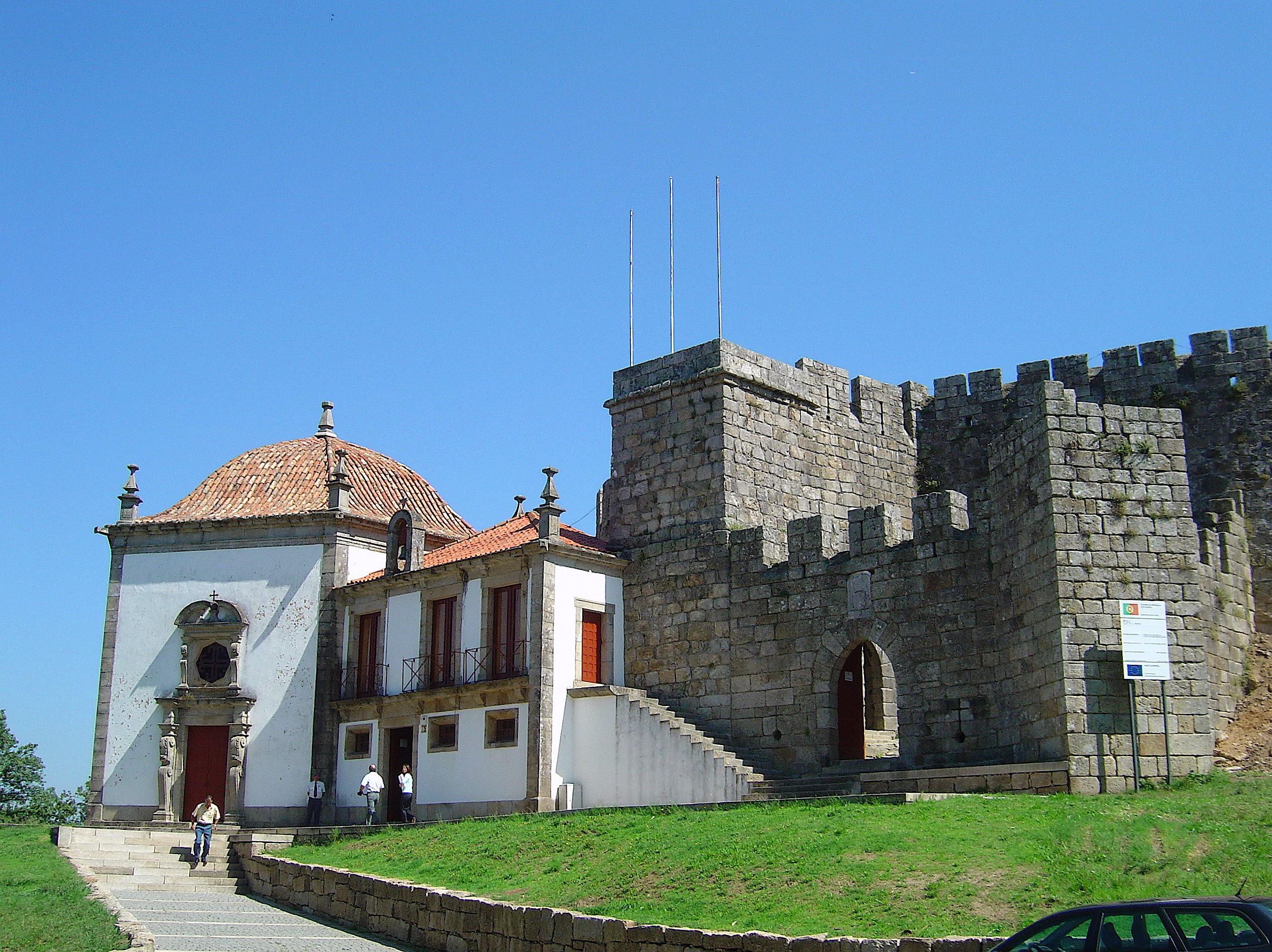
The Baroque-era chapel on the exterior wall, added by the Countess of Feira in 1656

Throughout the castle grounds are signs and monuments to importance events during the castle's history, including several inscriptions:

- A commemorative inscription marking the third century of the Portuguese Restoration, carved on an ashlar to the right of one doorway in granite, stating: A HISTÓRIA DESTE CASTELO FOI RECORDADA COM GRATIDÃO PELOS PORTUGUESES DE 1940 (The history of the Castle was recorded with gratitude by the Portuguese of 1940);
- Ara votive inscription engraved on a copy of Roman altar, with the use of the letter U, instead of a V, with the inscription: BAND VELUGO TOIRAECO LUCIO LATEIVSBLAESUS VLAS.
- Another ara votive inscription with granite, with the writing: DEO TVERACO VOLENTI ARCIVS EPEICI BRACARVS SOLVIT LIBENS (Devoted to the benevolent god Tueracos Arcia, Son of Epeico, Bracari in payment of a vote);
- A commemorative inscription to mark the remodelling works on the castle, incised into granite that integrates a coat of arms, oval frame and gargoyles, over the door of the parade grounds, with the modern epigram O QUARTO CONDE DA FEIRA DOM DIOGO FORJAZ MANDOU FAZER ESTA E O RELÓGIO DAQUELA TORRE NA ERA DE 1562 (The 4th Count of Feira Dom Diogo Forjaz ordered this and the clock of that tower in the era of 1562).
- A modern commemorative inscription on the exterior illumination of the Castle carved in granite (decorated by four metal carnations on the corners and centred between two bombers), with the statement: AOS 13 DE JANEIRO DE 1963, FOI INAUGURADA A ILUMINAÇÃO EXTERIOR DESTE CASTELO POR SUAS EXCELÊNCIAS OS MINISTROS DAS OBRAS PÚBLICAS - ENGENHEIRO ARANTES E OLIVEIRA - E DA EDUCAÇÃO NACIONAL - PROFESSOR DOUTOR GALVÃO TELES (On 13 January 1963, was inaugurated the exterior illumination of this Castle by his Excellencies of Public Works, Engineer Arantes e Oliveira, and National Education, Professor Dr. Galvão Teles);
- An institutional identification plaque in metal, and screwed into the left pillar of the main gate, that provides access to the circe, stating: MINISTÉRIO DOS ASSUNTOS SOCIAIS. SECRETARIA DE ESTADO DA SEGURANÇA SOCIAL. CENTRO REGIONAL DE SEGURANÇA SOCIAL DE AVEIRO. CENTRO INFANTIL DA FEIRA (Minister of Social Issues. Secretary of State for Social Security. Regional Centre for Social Security in Aveiro. Children's Centre of Feira);
- A commemorative inscription on the chapel, carved between the doorway cornice and the ocular window in limestone: ESTA CAPELA MANDOU FAZER A CONDESSA DONA JOANA FORJAZ PEREIRA DE MENESES E SILVA 1656 (This chapel was ordered built by the Countess Dona Joana Forjaz Pereira de Meneses e Silva 1656).

Also, on an ashlar encountered in 1905, but since disappeared, was a date inscription of 1385. This inscription was first published by Leite de Vasconcelos in "Arqueólogo Português".
