= Hélder Castro =

Portuguese footballer

Personal information
- Full name: Hélder Fernando Ferreira de Castro
- Date of birth: 24 January 1986 (age 40)
- Place of birth: Fiães, Portugal
- Height: 1.74 m (5 ft 9 in)
- Position: Attacking midfielder

Youth career
- 1995–2001: Sion
- 2001–2005: Fiães

Senior career*
Years	Team	Apps	(Gls)
2005–2007	Fiães	46	(4)
2007–2010	Feirense	79	(8)
2010–2012	Universitatea Cluj	0	(0)
2011	→ Portimonense (loan)	10	(0)
2011–2012	→ Feirense (loan)	19	(2)
2012–2013	Olympiakos Nicosia	28	(6)
2013–2014	AEK Larnaca	31	(1)
2014	ASA Târgu Mureș	1	(0)
2015–2016	Feirense	7	(0)
2016–2018	Olympiakos Nicosia	26	(5)
2018–2020	Lusitânia	38	(4)
2020–2022	Anadia	28	(1)
2022-2024	Florgrade		
- * Club domestic league appearances and goals

Hélder Fernando Ferreira de Castro (born 24 January 1986) is a Portuguese former professional footballer who played as an attacking midfielder.

== Post-playing career ==
After retiring as a player, Castro transitioned to coaching and is the head coach of the club Florgrade FC, competing in the Portuguese championship.
