= Lourosa =

Lourosa is the name of multiple locations in Portugal:

- Lourosa (Oliveira do Hospital), a parish in the municipality of Oliveira do Hospital
- Lourosa (Santa Maria da Feira)
