= Dinis Resende =

Portuguese footballer

Dinis
Personal information
- Full name: Dinis da Silva Gomes Resende
- Date of birth: 15 April 1967 (age 59)
- Place of birth: Paços de Brandão, Portugal
- Height: 1.92 m (6 ft 3 1/2 in)
- Position: Centre-back

Youth career
- 1981–1982: Paços Brandão
- 1982–1983: Sanjoanense
- 1983–1985: Porto
- 1985–1986: Fajões

Senior career*
Years	Team	Apps	(Gls)
1986–1987	Feirense	25	(2)
1987–1995	Beira-Mar	133	(3)
1995–1996	Académica	24	(0)
1996–1997	União Lamas	23	(2)
1997–1999	Gil Vicente	55	(6)
1999–2002	Maia	73	(1)
2002–2003	Feirense	26	(2)
2003–2005	Gondomar	44	(5)
Total		403	(21)

Managerial career
- 2005–2007: União Lamas (youth)
- 2010–2011: Boavista (assistant)
- * Club domestic league appearances and goals

Dinis da Silva Gomes Resende (born 15 April 1967 in Paços de Brandão, Santa Maria da Feira, Aveiro District), known simply as Dinis, is a Portuguese former professional footballer who played as a central defender.
