= Entre Douro e Vouga =

Coordinates: 40°54′N 8°30′W

Map showing the location of the Entre Douro e Vouga subregion

Entre Douro e Vouga (Portuguese pronunciation: [ˌẽtɾɨ ˌðoɾu i ˈvoɣɐ]) was a former NUTS3 Portuguese subregion. It was abolished at the January 2015 NUTS 3 revision. It is now part of Metropolitan Area of Porto - NUTS3, integrated in the NUTS2 Norte Region. Its name stood for the fact that it covered an area between the Douro River and Vouga River. It was bordered in the north by Grande Porto Subregion and Tâmega Subregion and in the south by the Centro Region (Baixo Vouga and Dão-Lafões).

It had a total surface area of 858 km^{2} (the third smallest) and a population of 283,856 inhabitants for a density of 330 inhabitants/km^{2}.

The main urban centres were the cities of Santa Maria da Feira, Oliveira de Azeméis and São João da Madeira, each of them counting approximately 20,000 inhabitants. Other cities:Lourosa, Fiães and Vale de Cambra (all with less than 10,000). Its main economic activity is centered in light industry, paper and agriculture transformation (mainly rice and cork) and shoe fabrication.

== Municipalities ==
Its municipalities are:

- Arouca
- Oliveira de Azeméis
- Santa Maria da Feira
- São João da Madeira
- Vale de Cambra

All of the above municipalities have city status, except Arouca.
