= Escapães =

Civil parish in Portugal

- Civil parish
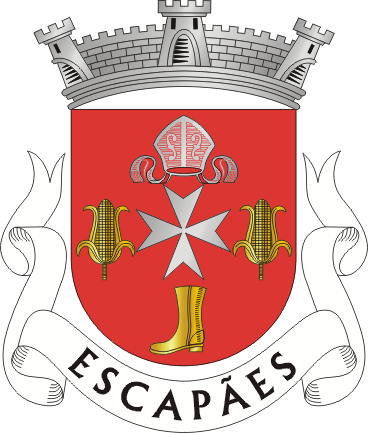
- Coat of arms

- Location in Portugal
- Coordinates: 40.922°N 8.517°W
- Country: Portugal
- Region: Norte
- Metropolitan area: Porto
- District: Aveiro
- Municipality: Santa Maria da Feira

Area
  - Total: 4.30 km^{2} (1.66 sq mi)

Population (2011)
  - Total: 3,309
  - Density: 770/km^{2} (2,000/sq mi)
- Time zone: UTC+00:00 (WET)
  - Summer (DST): UTC+01:00 (WEST)

Escapães is a Portuguese parish, located in the municipality of Santa Maria da Feira. The population in 2011 was 3,309, in an area of 4.30 km^{2}.
