= Santa Maria de Lamas =

Civil parish in Portugal

- Civil parish
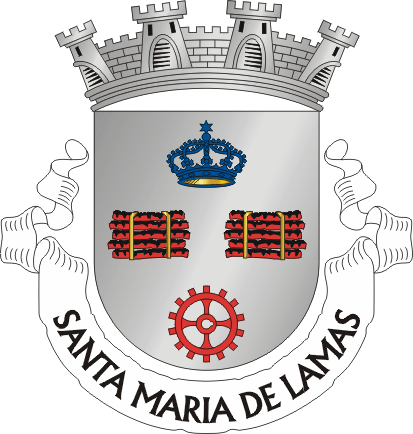
- Coat of arms

- Location in Portugal
- Coordinates: 40.982°N 8.573°W
- Country: Portugal
- Region: Norte
- Metropolitan area: Porto
- District: Aveiro
- Municipality: Santa Maria da Feira

Area
  - Total: 3.75 km^{2} (1.45 sq mi)

Population (2011)
  - Total: 5,073
  - Density: 1,400/km^{2} (3,500/sq mi)
- Time zone: UTC+00:00 (WET)
  - Summer (DST): UTC+01:00 (WEST)

Santa Maria de Lamas (Portuguese meaning Saint Mary of Lamas) is a Portuguese civil parish located in the municipality of Santa Maria da Feira, in the district of Aveiro, in the Entre Douro e Vouga Subregion. It is located between the Douro and Vouga rivers and is part of the Porto Metropolitan Area. The population in 2011 was 5,073, in an area of 3.75 km^{2}. The village became a town on September 25, 1985.

== Sporting clubs ==
- C.F. União de Lamas
