= São Paio de Oleiros =

Civil parish in Portugal

- Civil parish
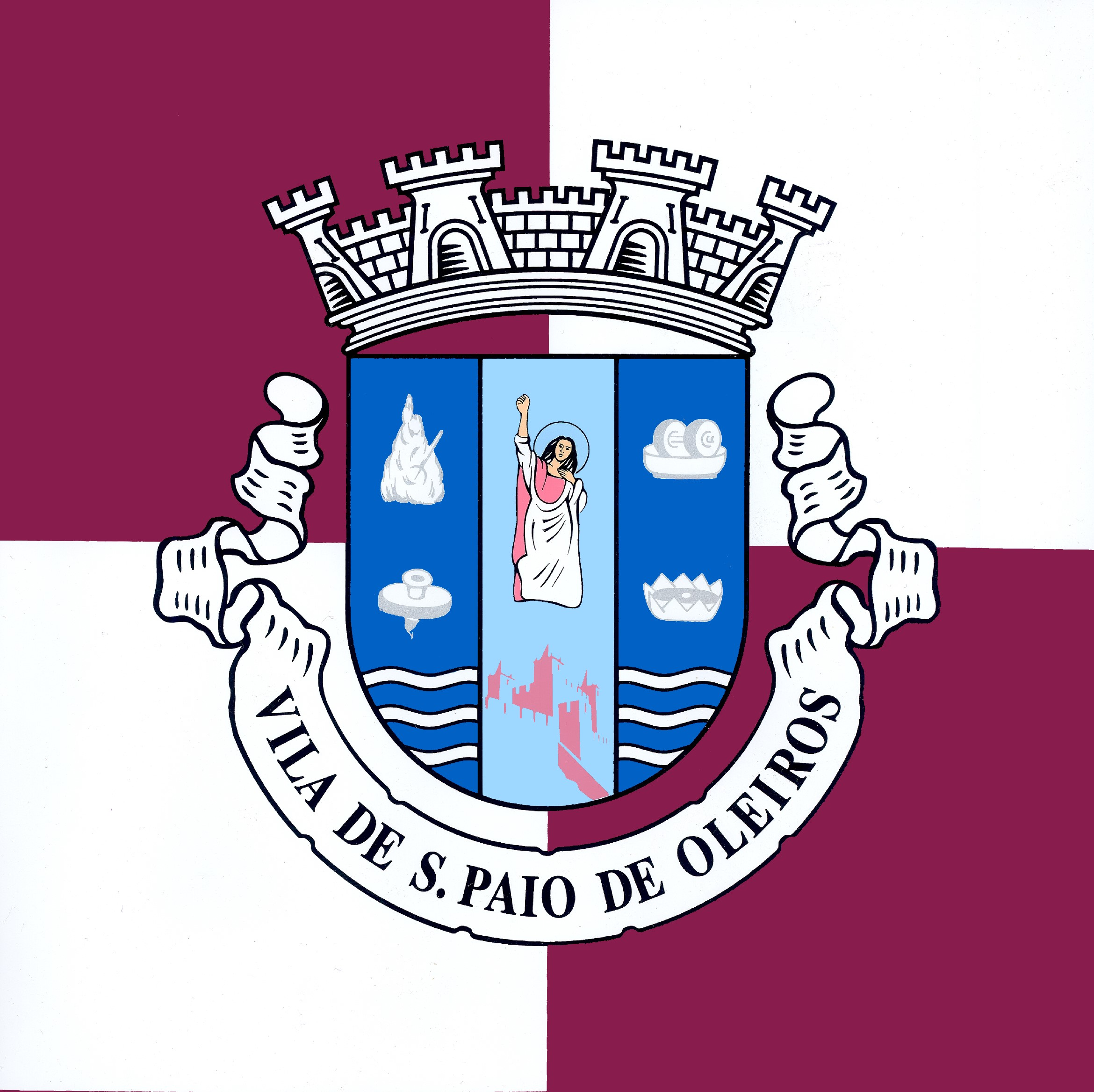
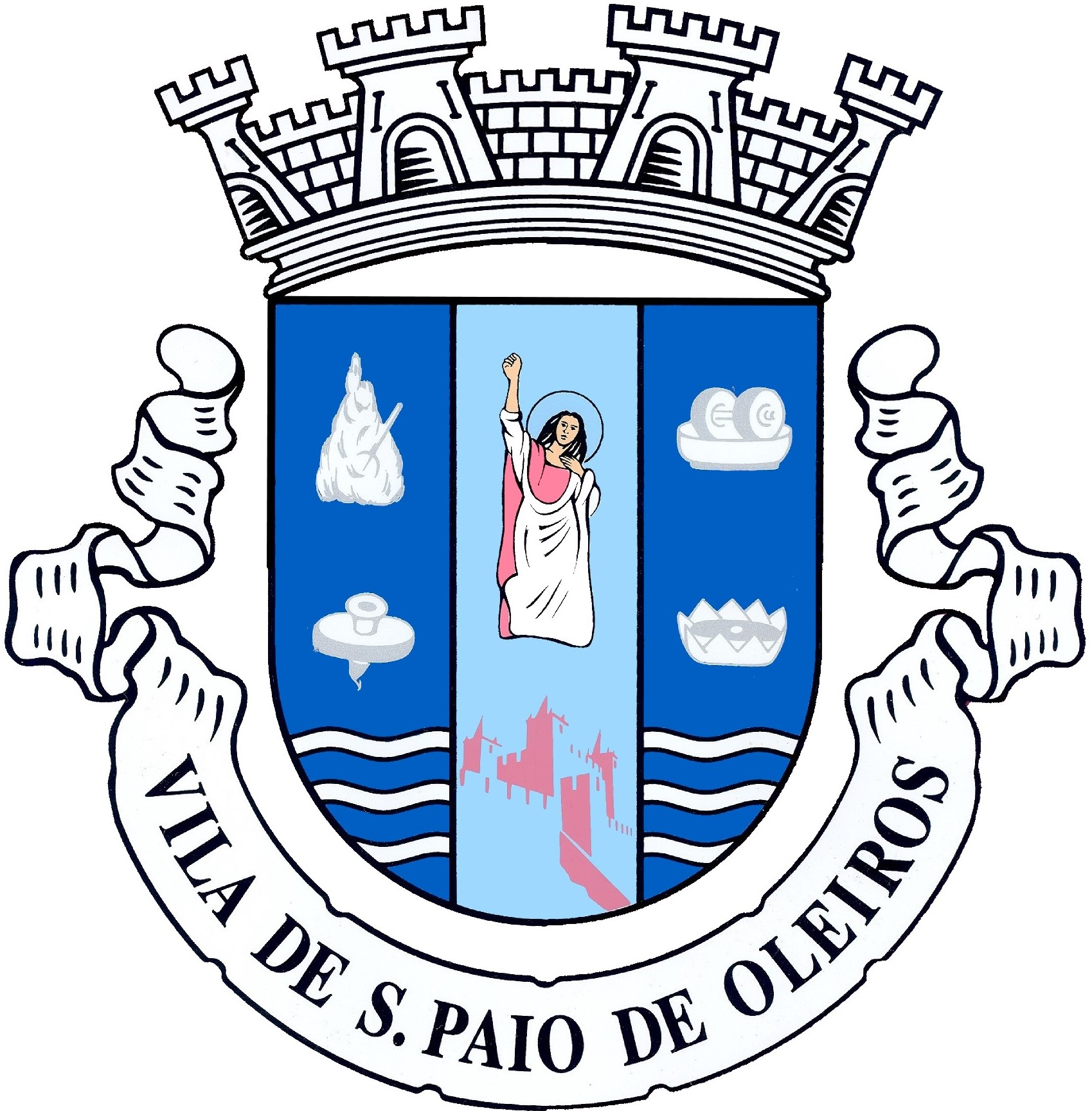
- Flag Coat of arms

- Location in Portugal
- Coordinates: 40.990°N 8.593°W
- Country: Portugal
- Region: Norte
- Metropolitan area: Porto
- District: Aveiro
- Municipality: Santa Maria da Feira

Area
  - Total: 3.91 km^{2} (1.51 sq mi)

Population (2011)
  - Total: 4,069
  - Density: 1,000/km^{2} (2,700/sq mi)
- Time zone: UTC+00:00 (WET)
  - Summer (DST): UTC+01:00 (WEST)

São Paio de Oleiros (Portuguese pronunciation: [sɐ̃w ˈpaju ðoˈlɐjɾuʃ]) is a Portuguese parish, located in the town of Santa Maria da Feira. The population in 2011 was 4,069, in an area of 3.91 km^{2}.

The only hospital of the town of Santa Maria da Feira was once located in São Paio de Oleiros, after the opening of a bigger hospital in municipality, Feira, in the late 1990s, the hospital of São Paio de Oleiros was closed.

São Paio de Oleiros is known for its cork industries.

== Culture ==
- São Paio de Oleiros public library.
- Grupo Musical de São Paio de Oleiros
- "Associação Musical Oleirense" (AMO).

== Sport ==
The three main sport institutions are:

- Centro Desportivo e Cultural (badminton and handball)
- Escola de Ciclismo Fernando Carvalho (cycling)
- Grupo Desportivo São Paio de Oleiros (football and athletics)
