= Fornos (Santa Maria da Feira) =

Civil parish in Portugal

- Civil parish
- Location in Portugal
- Coordinates: 40.917°N 8.527°W
- Country: Portugal
- Region: Norte
- Metropolitan area: Porto
- District: Aveiro
- Municipality: Santa Maria da Feira

Area
  - Total: 3.14 km^{2} (1.21 sq mi)

Population (2011)
  - Total: 3,397
  - Density: 1,100/km^{2} (2,800/sq mi)
- Time zone: UTC+00:00 (WET)
  - Summer (DST): UTC+01:00 (WEST)

Fornos is a Portuguese parish, located in the municipality of Santa Maria da Feira. The population in 2011 was 3,397, in an area of 3.14 km^{2}.
