= Santa Maria da Feira =

- Municipality
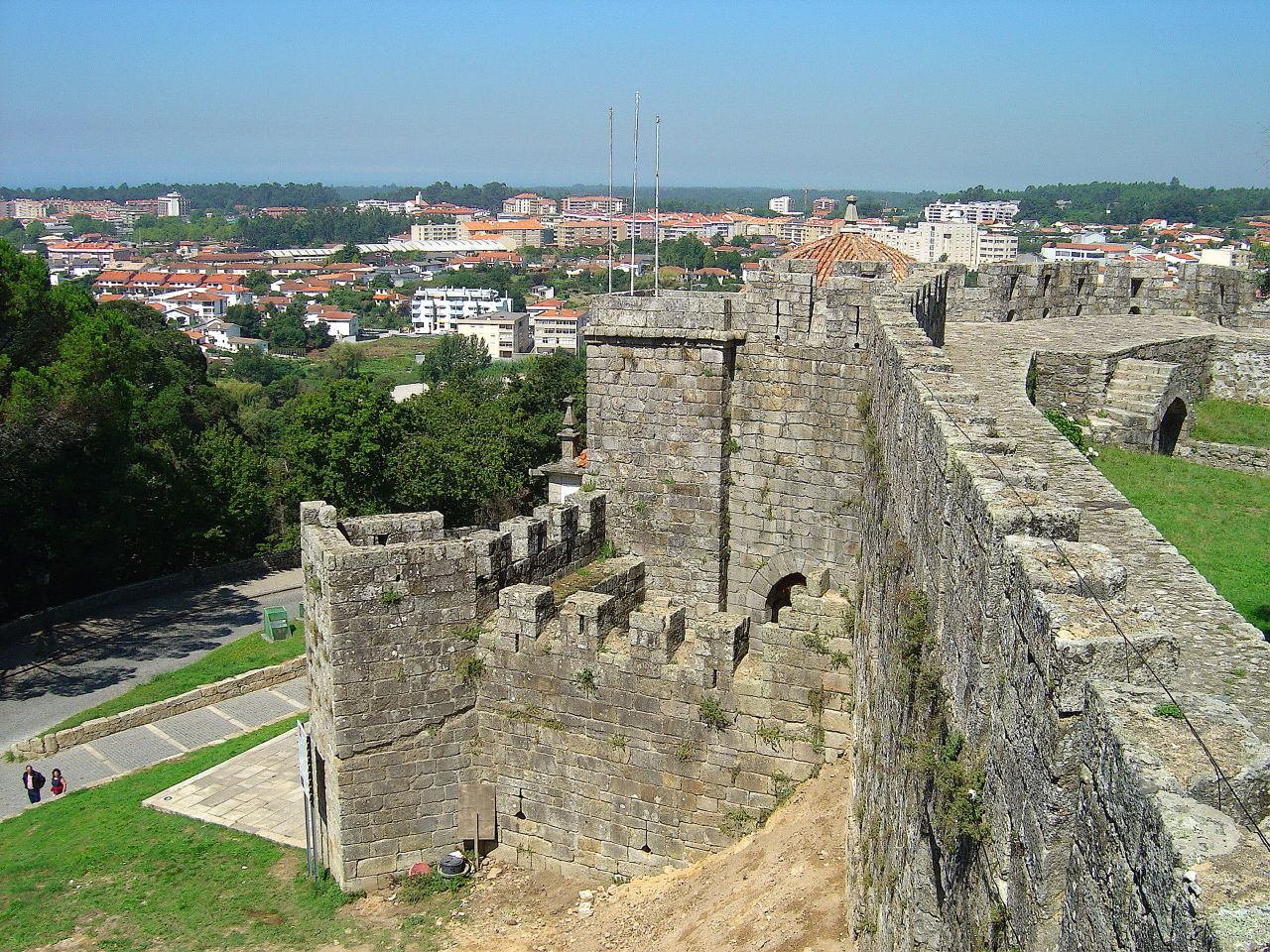
- View of Santa Maria da Feira

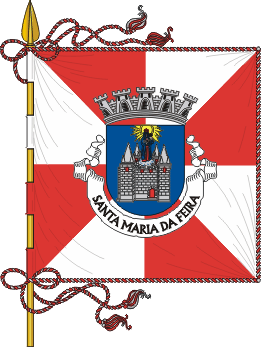
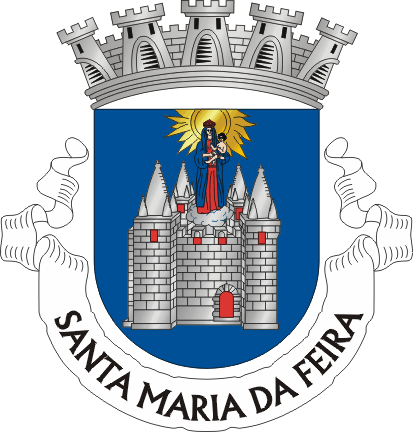
- Flag Coat of arms
- Interactive map of Santa Maria da Feira
- Coordinates: 40°56′N 8°32′W
- Country: Portugal
- Region: Norte
- Metropolitan area: Porto
- District: Aveiro
- Parishes: 21

Government
  - President: Amadeu Albergaria (PSD)

Area
  - Total: 215.88 km^{2} (83.35 sq mi)

Population (2011)
  - Total: 139,309
  - Density: 645.31/km^{2} (1,671.3/sq mi)
- Time zone: UTC+00:00 (WET)
  - Summer (DST): UTC+01:00 (WEST)
- Website: www.cm-feira.pt/portal/site/cm-feira

Santa Maria da Feira (European Portuguese pronunciation: [ˈsɐ̃tɐ mɐˈɾi.ɐ ðɐ ˈfɐjɾɐ]) is a city and a municipality in Aveiro District in Portugal, 23 km from central Porto. The population in 2011 was 139,309, in an area of 215.88 km^{2} (83.35 sq mi).

== History ==
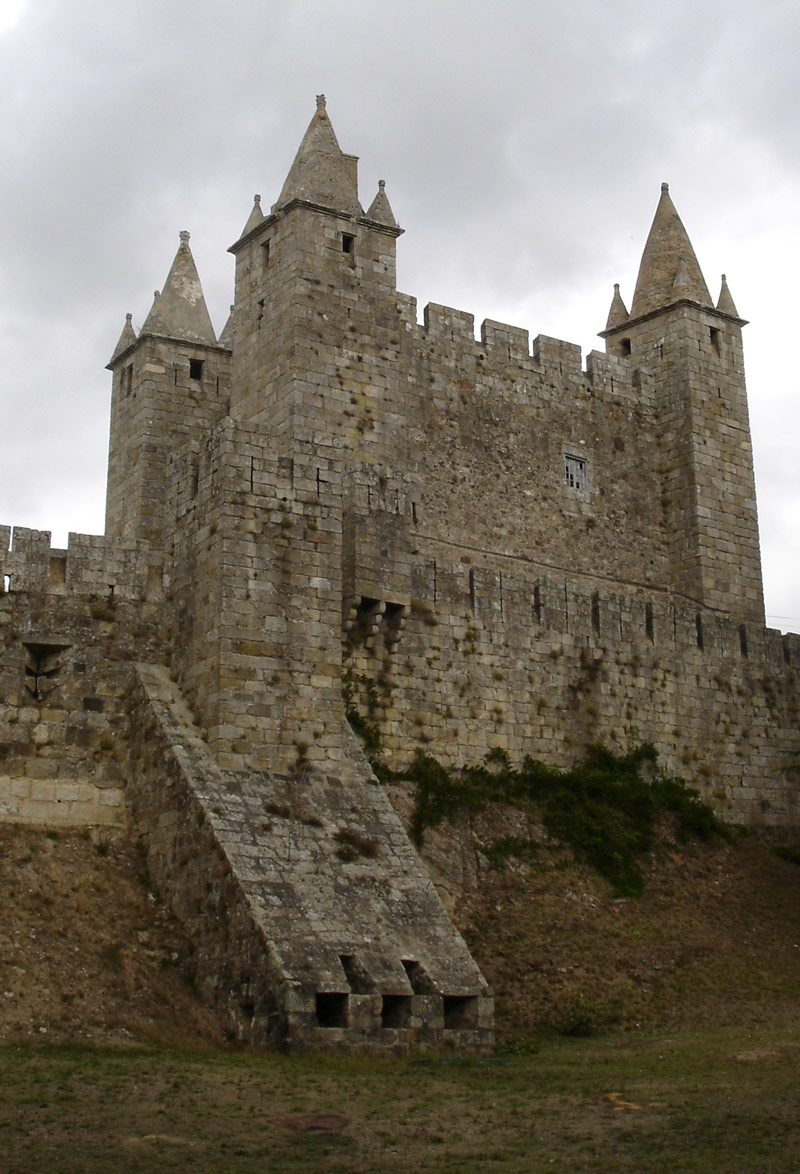
Castle of Santa Maria da Feira.

Santa Maria is located in area that allowed it to be a crossroads of various peoples. Ancient Roman roadways connected Porto, Viseu, Lisbon and Braga and intersected the region, and was used until the 19th century. In addition, pre-Roman castros dotted the territory.

The Castle of Santa Maria da Feira is the fulcrum of the history of the region, and an important point in the Reconquista. In 868, Alfonso III of León created the administrative and military region, that he called Terra de Santa Maria, he laid its defences in the military fortress that existed there, in Civitas Sanctae Mariae. Since 1117, Feira was the location of one of the most important fairs in Portugal, which, over time, gave the town its name. The fair was established in the shadow of the castle.

In the time of king Denis of Portugal, Feira already was the see of a julgado (old administrative division). This is testified by an ancient document called Foral Velho. It was awarded a new foral in 1514, when Manuel I of Portugal was the King of Portugal.

== Art ==
Danonaselo is a sculpture created by San Damon at the very beginning of the creation of Oniroscopism in 2004 and even before. It is part of the S.O.G. series (Geometric Oniroscopic Sculpture). Danonaselo is a very specific proper name given by San Damon to this sculpture. All the difficulty comes from the fact that Damon had to move from 2D drawing to 3D sculpture with the particular twists and angles that emerge from the strange character. Indeed, the night lighting surrounding the Danonaselo and the daylight that illuminates it, and in particular the presence of the sun that revolves around it, makes us see a totally different character. Shadows are thrown to the ground and angles are projected on the facades. The Danonaselo is placed for life in a public square in Portugal, in Fiães in the entity of Santa Maria da Feira and is part of the Portuguese heritage. The work is three metres high and looks out, as San Damon wanted, towards the ocean through the lands of Mozelos, Lourosa, São Paio de Oleiros, etc. The roundabout on which the Danonaselo is placed is decorated with certain flowers in harmony with the work. A plaque on the base explains the meaning of the work and a poem written by San Damon encloses it.

== Geography ==
The municipality includes several towns (vilas) and 3 cities (cidades): Santa Maria da Feira, Fiães and Lourosa. It is the most populous município in Entre Douro e Vouga and it is part of the Greater Metropolitan Area of Porto.

Administratively, the municipality is divided into 21 civil parishes (freguesias):

- Argoncilhe
- Arrifana
- Caldas de São Jorge e Pigeiros
- Canedo, Vale e Vila Maior
- Escapães
- Fiães
- Fornos
- Lobão, Gião, Louredo e Guisande
- Lourosa
- Milheirós de Poiares
- Mozelos
- Nogueira da Regedoura
- Paços de Brandão
- Rio Meão
- Romariz
- Sanguedo
- Santa Maria da Feira, Travanca, Sanfins e Espargo
- Santa Maria de Lamas
- São João de Ver
- São Paio de Oleiros
- São Miguel do Souto e Mosteirô

== Demographics ==
Historical population

Year	Pop.	±%
1864	31,692	—
1878	33,676	+6.3%
1890	36,684	+8.9%
1900	38,494	+4.9%
1911	45,048	+17.0%
1920	45,008	−0.1%
1930	52,679	+17.0%
1940	61,505	+16.8%

Year	Pop.	±%
1950	70,532	+14.7%
1960	83,483	+18.4%
1970	94,970	+13.8%
1981	109,531	+15.3%
1991	118,641	+8.3%
2001	135,964	+14.6%
2011	139,312	+2.5%
2021	136,674	−1.9%

Source: INE

== International relations ==
Santa Maria da Feira Municipality is twinned with:

- Catió, Guinea-Bissau
- Joué-lès-Tours, France, since 1989
- Kenitra, Morocco
- Targovishte, Bulgaria

== Economy ==
Santa Maria da Feira is a heavily industrialized municipality and is famous for its several cork transforming and shoe factories. The town is the headquarters of Amorim corporation. The seat of the municipality is Feira, famous for its medieval castle which was the residence of Portugal's first king, Afonso Henriques, for a short period of time. The castle, located at the top of a hill, was of considerable strategic importance during its time.

Every year, in summer, a medieval festival takes place in Santa Maria da Feira - the Viagem Medieval - during which the city goes back to the Middle Ages.

== Architecture ==
The municipality's sights include the Convento do Espírito Santo (convent), the Igreja da Misericórdia (church; 18th century), and the Rua Direita (street; 18th and 19th century architecture). However, its greatest landmark is the castelo Santa Maria da Feira Castle, from the 11th century.

== Culture ==
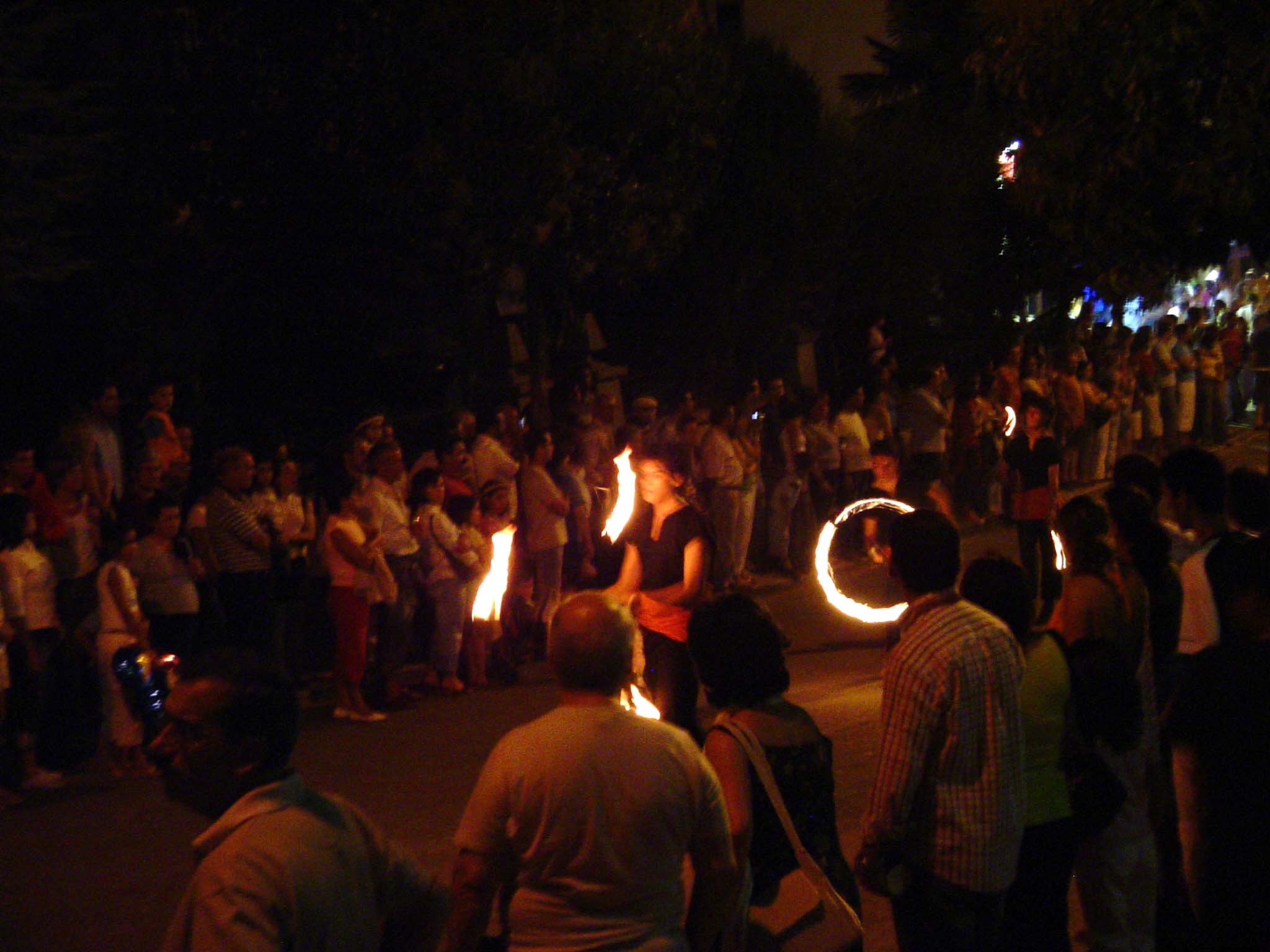
Medieval festival parade

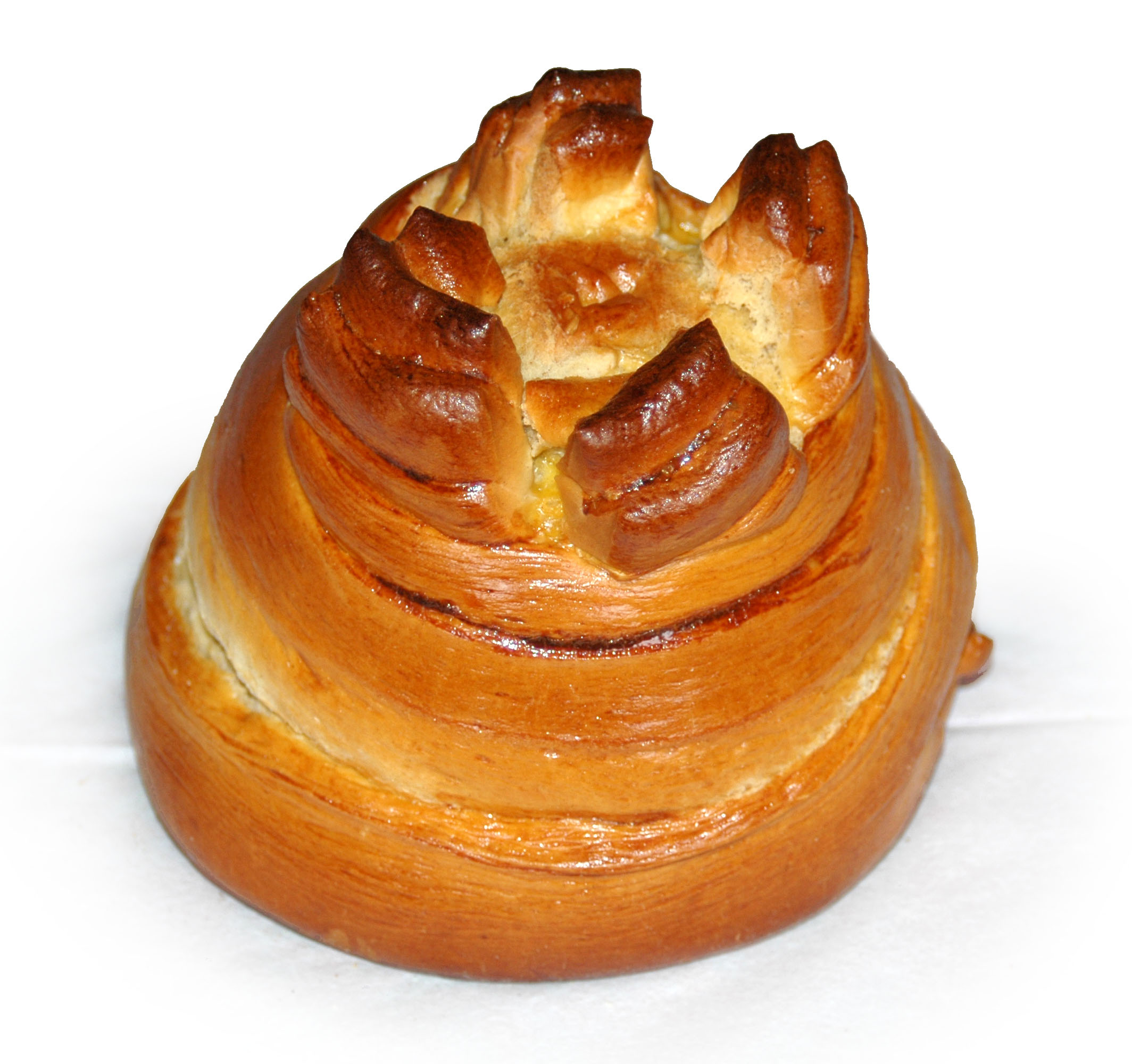
Fogaça - typical sweet bread

The municipal holiday is January 20. It's the day when the whole municipality celebrates the Fogaceiras. The Fogaceiras is a special local holiday. During the Middle Ages, the lands of Santa Maria (as it was known back then) were infested by the dark plague. To get rid of this calamity, the locals offered a sweet roll, called fogaça, to the patron saint Saint Sebastian. The Fogaceiras have been celebrated for five hundred years, since the eradication of the dark plague.

The municipality has a science museum, the Visionarium.

== Notable people ==
- Américo Amorim (1934 in Mozelos – 2017) a Portuguese billionaire businessman and a 50% owner of Corticeira Amorim
- Berta Nunes (born 1955) a Portuguese doctor and politician; was Mayor of the city of Alfândega da Fé

=== Sport ===
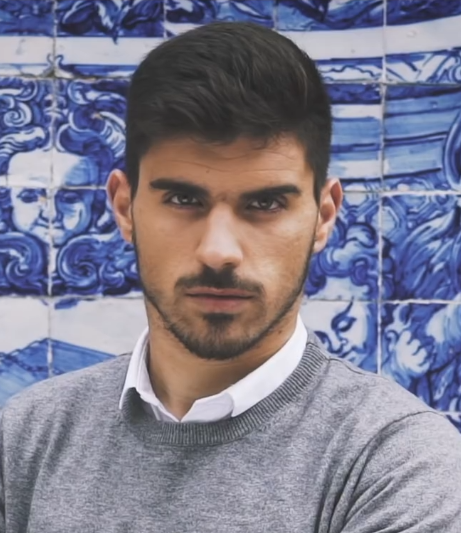
Rúben Neves, 2017

- Dinis Resende (born 1967 in Paços de Brandão), known as Dinis, a Portuguese former footballer with 403 club caps
- Pedro Martins (born 1970) a Portuguese football manager and former player with 358 club caps
- António Leonel Vilar Nogueira Sousa (born 1980), known as Tonel, is a Portuguese former footballer with 432 club caps
- Hélder Castro (born 1986 in Fiães) a Portuguese footballer with over 400 club caps
- Sérgio Oliveira (born 1992 in Paços de Brandão) a Portuguese footballer with over 200 club caps and 13 for Portugal
- Rúben Neves (born 1997) a Portuguese footballer, plays for Wolverhampton Wanderers F.C. and has 32 caps with Portugal
- Fábio Vieira (born 2000) a Portuguese footballer, plays for Arsenal F.C.

== Sport ==
C.D. Feirense is based in the municipality.
