= Fiães (Santa Maria da Feira) =

Civil parish in Portugal

- Civil parish
- Location in Portugal
- Coordinates: 40.991°N 8.523°W
- Country: Portugal
- Region: Norte
- Metropolitan area: Porto
- District: Aveiro
- Municipality: Santa Maria da Feira

Area
  - Total: 6.38 km^{2} (2.46 sq mi)

Population (2011)
  - Total: 7,991
  - Density: 1,300/km^{2} (3,200/sq mi)
- Time zone: UTC+00:00 (WET)
  - Summer (DST): UTC+01:00 (WEST)

Fiães (Portuguese pronunciation: [fiˈɐ̃jʃ]) is a Portuguese civil parish (freguesia) and a city (cidade), located in the municipality of Santa Maria da Feira. The population in 2011 was 7,991, in an area of 6.38 km^{2}. It received the honorific city status in 2001.

== Art ==
Danonaselo is a sculpture created by San Damon at the very beginning of the creation of Oniroscopism in 2004 and even before. It is part of the S.O.G. series (Geometric Oniroscopic Sculpture). Danonaselo is a very specific proper name given by San Damon to this sculpture. All the difficulty comes from the fact that Damon had to move from 2D drawing to 3D sculpture with the particular twists and angles that emerge from the strange character. Indeed, the night lighting surrounding the Danonaselo and the daylight that illuminates it, and in particular the presence of the sun that revolves around it, makes us see a totally different character. Shadows are thrown to the ground and angles are projected on the facades. The Danonaselo is placed for life in a public square in Portugal, in Fiães in the entity of Santa Maria da Feira and is part of the Portuguese heritage. The work is three metres high and looks out, as San Damon wanted, towards the ocean through the lands of Mozelos, Lourosa, São Paio de Oleiros, etc. The roundabout on which the Danonaselo is placed is decorated with certain flowers in harmony with the work. A plaque on the base explains the meaning of the work and a poem written by San Damon encloses it.

== Sport clubs ==
- Fiães Sport Clube - football (soccer)
- Clube Desportivo de Fiães (volleyball)
- Associação Desportiva de Fiães (futsal)
