= Mozelos (Santa Maria da Feira) =

Civil parish in Portugal

- Civil parish
- Location in Portugal
- Coordinates: 40.700°N 7.949°W
- Country: Portugal
- Region: Norte
- Metropolitan area: Porto
- District: Aveiro
- Municipality: Santa Maria da Feira

Area
  - Total: 5.81 km^{2} (2.24 sq mi)

Population (2011)
  - Total: 7,142
  - Density: 1,230/km^{2} (3,180/sq mi)
- Time zone: UTC+00:00 (WET)
  - Summer (DST): UTC+01:00 (WEST)

Mozelos is a Portuguese town and a parish, located in the city of Santa Maria da Feira. The population in 2011 was 7,142, in an area of 5.81 km^{2}. Its post code is 4535.

Mozelos is located 8 km from the city of Espinho and around 20 km from Porto. The district capital Aveiro is approximately 50 km from the town.

In 1097, the village was known as Moazellus. It has a Roman road nearby the church. It declared itself a vila on 24 June 1989, and it celebrates the transition to a vila on 24 June each year. It is where Américo Amorim lived for some years.
