= Fiães S.C. =

Portuguese football club

Fiães
- Full name: Fiães Sport Clube
- Founded: 1932
- Ground: Estádio do Bolhão; Fiães, Portugal
- Capacity: 5,700
- Chairman: Carlos Pereira da Silva
- Manager: José Pedro
- League: A.F. Aveiro Campeonato Sabseg Zona Norte
- Website: https://fiaessc.s7.emjogo.pt/pt/

The Fiães Sport Clube is a Portuguese football club located in the parish of Fiães in the city of Santa Maria da Feira, district of Aveiro, Portugal.

== History ==
The club was founded in 1932. Its current president is Carlos Pereira da Silva. In the 2005–2006 season, the team plays in the Second Division, série B.

== Rankings ==
	I	II	II B	III	AF	Points	Matches	W	D	L	GF	GA	Diff.
1992–1993			7			39 pts	34	15	9	10	48	32	16
1993–1994			10			35 pts	34	12	11	11	45	38	7
1995–1996				3		62 pts	34	18	8	8	78	45	+33
...													
1997–1998				9		44 pts	34	12	8	14	40	41	−1
...													
2003–2004				2		69 pts	34	20	9	5	59	21	+38
2004–2005			11			53 pts	38	15	8	15	55	44	+11
2005–2006			11			30 pts	26	7	9	10	30	32	−2
2006–2007			7			36 pts	26	10	6	10	32	32	0
2007–2008			11										

== Stadium ==
- Bolhão Stadium in Fiães.

== Equipment ==
- Lacatoni
- Fabylak – Tintas e Vernizes
