= Lourosa (Santa Maria da Feira) =

Civil parish in Portugal

- Civil parish
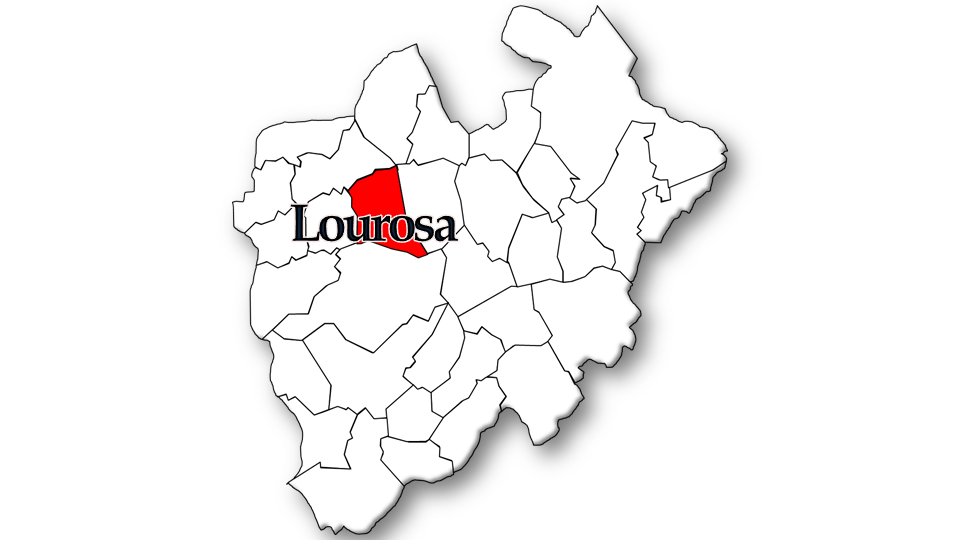

- Location in Portugal
- Coordinates: 40.988°N 8.546°W
- Country: Portugal
- Region: Norte
- Metropolitan area: Porto
- District: Aveiro
- Municipality: Santa Maria da Feira

Area
  - Total: 5.77 km^{2} (2.23 sq mi)

Population (2011)
  - Total: 8,636
  - Density: 1,500/km^{2} (3,880/sq mi)
- Time zone: UTC+00:00 (WET)
  - Summer (DST): UTC+01:00 (WEST)

Lourosa (Portuguese pronunciation: [loˈɾɔzɐ]) is a Portuguese civil parish (Pt.freguesia) and a city (Pt.cidade), located in the municipality of Santa Maria da Feira. The population in 2011 was 8,636, in an area of 5.77 km^{2}. Lourosa obtained city status in 2001.

03/11/2024 The city of Lourosa is particularly linked to the cork industry. Large industries improving the raw material cork saw its cooking to extract tannins and increase elasticity with the flattening of planks extracted from cork oaks and then the ancient art of squaring for garlopa and making cork stoppers. Nowadays, the production of cork stoppers is carried out using drills, first manual and now automatic, in succession to garlopas.

Edmundo Alves Ferreira and José Lima were major industrialists based in Lourosa, with their units employing hundreds of cork workers.

Today Lourosa and its surroundings are a valuable reservoir of connoisseurs of cork, its production and specific cork's "know how".
