= List of former municipalities of Portugal =

This is a list of the former municipalities of Portugal by alphabetic order. In the past Portugal used to have over 900 municipalities, but presently it counts only 308.

== A ==
Former municipality	Parish(es) it included	Current municipality(ies)	Creation	Extinction
Abadim	Abadim	Cabeceiras de Basto		1836, 6 November
Abitureiras	Almagreira	Pombal		1836, 6 November
Abiul	Abiul	Pombal		1836, 6 November
Aboim da Nóbrega	Aboim da Nóbrega, Azias, Barros, Codeceda, Covas, Ermida, Entre Ambos-os-Rios, Grovelas, Penascais and Valões	Vila Verde and Ponte da Barca	1838, 17 April (re-established)	1836, 6 November (1st) 1853, 31 December (2nd)
Abreiro	Abreiro, Navalho and Sobreira^{(aa)}	Mirandela and Murça		1836, 6 November
Abrunheira	Abrunheira, Brunhós, Gesteira, Samuel, Verride, Vila Nova da Barca and Vinha da Rainha	Montemor-o-Velho and Soure		1844, 7 October (transferred to the municipality of Verride)
Abrunhosa-a-Velha		Mangualde		19th century
Açores		Celorico da Beira	1512	19th century
Água de Pau		Lagoa	1515	1855
Água de Peixes		Alvito		
Água Revés		Valpaços		19th century
Aguada de Baixo		Águeda		
Aguada de Cima		Águeda	1514	1836
Águas Belas		Ferreira do Zêzere	1513	1836
Aguda		Figueiró dos Vinhos	1212	19th century
Aguiar		Viana do Alentejo	1287	
Aguiar de Sousa		Paredes, Gondomar, Valongo, Lousada and Paços de Ferreira	1269	1821
Águias		Mora	1520	Transferred to Brotas in the late 18th century
Aguieira		Águeda	1514	1836
Aguim	Aguim and Tamengos	Anadia		1836, 6 November
Albergaria de Penela		Ponte de Lima and Vila Verde	20 June 1514	1837
Albergaria dos Fusos		Cuba		
Alcáçovas		Viana do Alentejo	1258	
Alcafache		Mangualde		
Alcaide		Fundão		19th century
Alcanede		Santarém and Rio Maior	1163	24 October 1855
Alcoentre		Azambuja and Cadaval	1174	24 October 1855
Aldeia Galega da Merceana		Alenquer	1305	24 October 1855
Alegrete		Portalegre		24 October 1855
Alfaiates		Sabugal	1297	1836
Alfarela de Jales		Vila Pouca de Aguiar and Murça	1220	1853
Alfeizerão		Alcobaça		
Algodres		Fornos de Algodres		19th century
Algoso		Vimioso, Miranda do Douro and Mogadouro		19th century
Alhadas		Figueira da Foz		
Alhais		Vila Nova de Paiva		
Alhandra		Vila Franca de Xira		1855
Alhos Vedros		Moita	1300s	1855
Aljubarrota		Alcobaça		
Almendra		Vila Nova de Foz Côa and Figueira de Castelo Rodrigo	1298	24 October 1855
Alpalhão		Nisa	1512	24 October 1855
Alpedrinha		Fundão	1202	24 October 1855
Alpedriz		Alcobaça		
Alter Pedroso		Alter do Chão		
Alva		Castro Daire	1514	1836
Alvalade		Santiago do Cacém		1834
Alvarenga		Arouca	1514	1855
Alvares		Góis		24 October 1855
Álvaro		Oleiros	1514	1836
Alverca da Beira		Pinhel		1853
Alverca do Ribatejo		Vila Franca de Xira	1160	1855
Alvoco da Serra		Seia	1514	19th century
Alvor		Portimão		
Alvorninha		Caldas da Rainha	1210	1836
Amêndoa		Mação		1836
Amieira		Portel	15 November 1512	
Amieira do Tejo		Nisa		
Ançã		Cantanhede, Coimbra and Mealhada	1371	1853
Angeja		Albergaria-a-Velha	1514	1853
Anobra		Condeixa-a-Nova		
Ansiães		Carrazeda de Ansiães	1075	
Apúlia		Esposende		1834
Aradas		Aveiro	1181	1836
Arazede		Montemor-o-Velho	1781	1840
Arcos		Tabuaço	1214	1834
Arega		Figueiró dos Vinhos	1201	19th century
Aregos		Resende	1183	1855
Arez		Nisa	1100s	1836
Arnóia		Celorico de Basto	1520	1719
Asseiceira		Tomar	1253	
Assequins		Águeda	1514	1834
Assumar		Monforte	1288	1836
Atalaia		Vila Nova da Barquinha	1213	
Atalaia do Campo		Fundão	1570	19th century
Atei		Mondim de Basto	1514	19th century
Atouguia da Baleia		Peniche	1167	6 November 1836
Aveiras de Baixo		Azambuja	1207	19th century
Aveiras de Cima		Azambuja	1210	1836
Avelar		Ansião	1514	1836
Avelãs de Caminho		Anadia	1514	1836
Avelãs de Cima		Anadia		19th century
Aveloso		Mêda	1514	1832
Avô		Oliveira do Hospital	1187	24 October 1855
Azambujeira		Rio Maior	1633	1836
Azaruja		Évora		
Azeitão		Setúbal	Left Sesimbra on 5 December 1759	24 October 1855
Ázere		Tábua		19th century
Azinhoso		Mogadouro	1386	19th century
Azueira		Mafra, Torres Vedras and Sobral de Monte Agraço	1820	24 October 1855
Azurara		Vila do Conde		19th century

== B ==
Former municipality	Parish(es) it included	Current municipality(ies)	Creation	Extinction
Baltar		Paredes	1834	1837
Banho		São Pedro do Sul	1152	19th century
Baraçal		Celorico da Beira		19th century
Barbacena		Elvas	1273	19th century
Barcos		Tabuaço	1263	1855
Barqueiros		Mesão Frio	1123	1836
Barreiros		Viseu		
Barrô de Aguada		Águeda	1514	19th century
Belas		Sintra		24 October 1855
Belém		Lisbon	1852	1885
Belide		Condeixa-a-Nova		19th century
Belver		Gavião	1518	1836
Bemposta		Mogadouro	1315, 15 June (Foral of Dinis I)	19th century
Bemposta		Penamacor	1510	1836
Benavila		Avis	1296	
Benviver		Marco de Canaveses	1514	1852
Beringel		Beja	23 November 1519	1839
Bertiandos		Ponte de Lima		
Besteiros		Tondela		1836
Boa Aldeia		Tondela		
Bobadela		Oliveira do Hospital		19th century
Botão		Coimbra	1514	19th century
Bouças		Matosinhos	1833	1909
Britiande		Lamego		19th century
Brotas		Mora	1700s	1834
Brunhido		Águeda		1836
Buarcos		Figueira da Foz	1342	1836
Burgo		Arouca	1363	1817

== C ==
Former municipality	Parish(es) it included	Current municipality(ies)	Creation	Extinction
Cabaços	Cabaços	Ponte de Lima		1836, 6 November
Cabeçais e Fermedo	Fermedo, Duas Igrejas^{(ca)}, Escariz, Louredo, Mansores, Romariz, São Miguel do Mato and Vale	Arouca and Santa Maria da Feira		1855, 24 October
Cabeção		Mora	1395	1836, 6 November
Cabeço de Vide		Fronteira	1512	24 October 1855
Cabra		Gouveia		
Cabrela		Montemor-o-Novo	1170	
Cabril		Castro Daire	1514	1835
Cacela		Vila Real de Santo António	17 July 1283	12 December 1775
Cadima		Cantanhede		31 December 1853
Calde		Viseu		
Cambeses (Couto de ou S. Tiago de)		Barcelos	1085	1836
Campanhã		Porto		1836
Canal		Estremoz	1500s	19th century
Canas de Sabugosa		Tondela		1836
Canas de Senhorim		Nelas	1196	1852
Canaveses		Marco de Canaveses		
Candosa		Tábua	1514	1842
Canelas		Peso da Régua		1853
Canha		Montijo	1172	17 April 1838
Cano		Sousel	1512	1826
Capareiros (Barroselas)		Viana do Castelo		1836
Capelas		Ponta Delgada	Law decree of 23 July 1839	1855
Carapito		Aguiar da Beira	1514	1836
Cardigos		Mação		19th century
Caria		Belmonte	1512	1836
Caria		Moimenta da Beira and Sernancelhe		1855
Carrazedo de Montenegro		Valpaços, Chaves and Murça		1853
Carvalho		Penacova	1514	19th century
Carvoeira		Mafra		
Carvoeiro		Mação	18 May 1518	19th century
Casal	Casal^{(cb)}, Sameice, Travancinha and Várzea de Meruge	Seia	1514	1836, 6 November (transferred to the municipality of Ervedal da Beira)
Casal de Álvaro		Águeda		19th century
Casével		Castro Verde	1510	1836
Castanheira do Ribatejo		Vila Franca de Xira		
Castanheira do Vouga		Águeda		
Castanheiro do Sul		São João da Pesqueira and Tabuaço		
Casteição		Mêda	1196	6 November 1836
Castelo		Moimenta da Beira		1834
Castelo Bom		Almeida	1296	1834
Castelo Mendo		Almeida	1229	24 October 1855
Castelo Novo		Fundão	1202	1835
Castelo Rodrigo		Figueira de Castelo Rodrigo		
Castro Laboreiro		Melgaço	1271	1855
Castro Vicente		Mogadouro	1305	1836
Cedovim		Vila Nova de Foz Côa	1271	1836
Cela		Alcobaça		
Celavisa		Arganil	1217	19th century
Celeirós		Sabrosa	1160	
Centuncelli (hoje Colmeal da Torre)		Belmonte	1188	1198
Cepães		Fafe		
Cercal do Alentejo		Santiago do Cacém	1836	1855
Cernache		Coimbra	1420	1836
Cerva		Ribeira de Pena		1853
Cervães		Vila Verde		1855
Chacim		Macedo de Cavaleiros		1855
Chancelaria		Alter do Chão	1518	1836
Chão de Couce		Ansião	1514	24 October 1855
Chavães		Tabuaço	1265	1836
Cheleiros		Mafra	1195	1836
Cinco Vilas		Figueira de Castelo Rodrigo	1519	19th century
Codesseiro		Guarda	1519	19th century
Coina		Barreiro	1516	
Coja		Arganil	1260	1853
Colares		Sintra	1255	24 October 1855
Colos		Odemira	1499, 26 June (Foral of Manuel I)	1836
Condeixa-a-Velha		Condeixa-a-Nova		
Correlhã		Ponte de Lima		
Cortiços		Macedo de Cavaleiros		1853
Couto de Esteves		Sever do Vouga	1128	1836
Couto do Mosteiro		Santa Comba Dão	1514	1836
Coz		Alcobaça		
Cucujães		Oliveira de Azeméis		
Currelos		Carregal do Sal		1836

== D ==
Former municipality	Parish(es) it included	Current municipality(ies)	Creation	Extinction
Dornes		Ferreira do Zêzere	1513	1836
Douro Calvo		Sátão		

== E ==
Former municipality	Parish(es) it included	Current municipality(ies)	Creation	Extinction
Ega		Condeixa-a-Nova	1231	1835
Eiras		Coimbra		
Eixo		Aveiro	1100s	19th century
Entradas		Castro Verde	1512	19th century
Envendos		Mação	18 May 1518	
Enxara dos Cavaleiros		Mafra	1519	19th century
Ericeira		Mafra	1229	24 October 1855
Ermelo		Mondim de Basto and Vila Real	1196	31 December 1853
Ermida do Paiva		Castro Daire		
Ervedal		Avis	1512	1836
Ervedal da Beira	Ervedal da Beira, Casal^{(cb)}, Sameice, Seixo do Erveda, Travancinha and Várzea de Meruge	Oliveira do Hospital and Seia		1855, 24 October
Ervededo	Ervededo, Bustelo, Calvão, Meixedo, Santo André de Vilar de Perdizes, São Miguel de Vilar de Perdizes, Seara Velha, Solveira, Soutelinho da Raia, Vila Meã da Raia^{(cc)}, Vilarelho da Raia and Vilela Seca	Chaves and Montalegre	1836	1853, 31 December
Ervedosa		Vinhais	1514	1836
Ervedosa do Douro		São João da Pesqueira		1834
Escalhão		Figueira de Castelo Rodrigo		19th century
Esgueira		Aveiro	1528	1836
Évora de Alcobaça		Alcobaça	1332	
Évora Monte		Estremoz		24 October 1855

== F ==
Former municipality	Parish(es) it included	Current municipality(ies)	Creation	Extinction
Facha	Facha and Vitorino das Donas	Ponte de Lima		
Faílde e Carocedo	Faílde	Bragança		1836, 6 November
Fajão	Fajão, Dornelas, Janeiro de Baixo, Teixeira, Unhais-o-Velho and Vidual de Cima	Pampilhosa da Serra and Arganil	1602	1855, 24 October
Famalicão	Famalicão	Guarda		1836, 6 November (transferred to the municipality of Valhelhas)
Farinha Podre	São Pedro de Farinha Podre, Carapinha (until 1837), Covelo, Oliveira do Cunhedo, Paradela, São Martinho da Cortiça, São Paio de Farinha Podre and Travanca de Farinha Podre	Penacova, Arganil and Tábua	1836	1853, 31 December
Faro do Alentejo	Faro do Alentejo	Cuba		1836, 6 November
Favaios	Favaios, Casal de Loivos, Cotas, Sanfins do Douro, Vale de Mendiz and Vilarinho de Cotas	Alijó		1853, 31 December
Feitosa	Feitosa	Ponte de Lima		1836, 6 November
Ferreira		Paços de Ferreira		
Ferreira de Aves		Sátão	1126	1836
Ferreiros		Anadia	1210	
Ferreiros de Tendais		Cinfães	1210	
Figueira		Avis	1510	19th century
Figueiró da Granja		Fornos de Algodres	1400s	1836
Folgosinho		Gouveia	1187	1836
Fonte Arcada		Sernancelhe	1193	24 October 1855
Fontelo	Fontelo	Armamar	1514	1836, 6 November
Fontes		Santa Marta de Penaguião		1836, 6 November
Forno Telheiro		Celorico da Beira		1836, 6 November
Frazão		Paços de Ferreira	1821	1836
Frechas		Mirandela		19th century
Fráguas		Vila Nova de Paiva	1514	1883
Freixiel		Vila Flor		1836
Freixo de Numão		Vila Nova de Foz Côa	1372	1855
Frieira		Bragança		19th century
Frossos		Albergaria-a-Velha	1124	1836

== G ==
Former municipality	Parish(es) it included	Current municipality(ies)	Creation	Extinction
Gafanhão	Gafanhão	Castro Daire		1836, 6 November
Gáfete	Gáfete	Crato	1688	1836, 6 November
Galegos		Vila Real	12 November 1519	6 November 1836
Galveias		Ponte de Sor	1538	19th century
Garvão		Ourique	1267	19th century
Geraz do Lima		Viana do Castelo	1515	
Gestaçô		Amarante	1514	
Godim		Peso da Régua		1837
Gondufe		Ponte de Lima		
Gosende		Castro Daire		1834
Gostei, Formil e Castanheira		Bragança	1298	19th century
Goujoim		Armamar		
Gouvães		Sabrosa	1202	1834
Gouveia do Tâmega		Amarante and Marco de Canaveses		
Gove		Baião		19th century
Gradil		Mafra	1327	1836
Granja do Tedo		Tabuaço		1834
Grijó		Vila Nova de Gaia		
Guardão		Tondela		1836
Guilheiro		Trancoso	1251	19th century
Gulfar		Sátão		19th century

== H ==
Former municipality	Parish(es) it included	Current municipality(ies)	Creation	Extinction
Horta		Vila Nova de Foz Côa	1512	18th century

== I ==
Former municipality	Parish(es) it included	Current municipality(ies)	Creation	Extinction
Idanha-a-Velha		Idanha-a-Nova	1229	1836
Infias		Fornos de Algodres		19th century
Izeda		Bragança and Macedo de Cavaleiros	1836	24 October 1855

== J ==
Former municipality	Parish(es) it included	Current municipality(ies)	Creation	Extinction
Jarmelo		Guarda		
Juromenha		Alandroal		1836

== L ==
Former municipality	Current municipality(ies)	Creation	Extinction
Ladário	Sátão		19th century
Lafões	Oliveira de Frades, São Pedro do Sul and Vouzela	1514	1836
Lagares da Beira	Oliveira do Hospital	1514	1836
Lagos da Beira	Oliveira do Hospital		
Lalim	Lamego	1514	1834
Lamarosa	Coruche		
Lamas de Orelhão	Mirandela	1259	1853
Lamegal	Pinhel		19th century
Landeira	Vendas Novas		
Landim	Vila Nova de Famalicão and Santo Tirso		19th century
Lanheses	Viana do Castelo and Ponte de Lima	1793	1835
Lapa	Sernancelhe	1740	1885
Lardosa	Castelo Branco		
Larim	Vila Verde	1514	19th century
Lavos	Figueira da Foz		1853
Lavradio	Barreiro	1670	1836
Lavre	Montemor-o-Novo	1304	
Lazarim	Lamego	1100s	1834
Leomil	Moimenta da Beira	1283	24 October 1855
Lindoso	Ponte da Barca		19th century
Linhares	Celorico da Beira	1169	1855
Longa	Tabuaço		6 November 1836
Longomel	Ponte de Sor		
Longroiva	Mêda	1124	6 November 1836
Lordelo	Vila Real	12 November 1519	6 November 1836
Loriga	Seia	1136	1855
Louredo	Paredes		
Louriçal	Pombal		24 October 1855
Lourosa	Oliveira do Hospital		
Lumiares	Armamar	1514	19th century

== M ==
Former municipality	Current municipality(ies)	Creation	Extinction
Maçãs de Caminho	Alvaiázere		
Maçãs de Dona Maria	Alvaiázere	1514	1855
Maceira Dão	Mangualde		19th century
Macieira de Cambra	Vale de Cambra	1514	1926
Magueija	Lamego		19th century
Maiorca	Figueira da Foz		1855
Maiorga	Alcobaça	1454	19th century
Manique do Intendente	Azambuja	1791	1836
Margem	Gavião	1518	1836
Marialva	Mêda	1157	1855
Matança	Fornos de Algodres	1270	1836
Meadas	Castelo de Vide		
Meãs do Campo	Montemor-o-Velho	1832	1840
Medelim	Idanha-a-Nova		19th century
Melo	Gouveia		19th century
Melres	Gondomar	1514	1834
Mesquitela	Celorico da Beira	1664	19th century
Messejana	Aljustrel	1235	24 October 1855
Mezio	Castro Daire		
Midões	Tábua	1514	1836
Moção	Castro Daire		1836
Mões	Castro Daire	1820	1855
Moita dos Ferreiros	Lourinhã		
Mondim da Beira	Tarouca		1896
Monforte de Rio Livre	Chaves and Valpaços	1273	1853
Monsanto	Idanha-a-Nova and Penamacor	1174	
Monsaraz	Reguengos de Monsaraz	1276	1838
Monsul	Póvoa de Lanhoso		
Montalvão	Nisa	1512	1834
Montargil	Ponte de Sor		1855
Monte de Fralães	Barcelos		
Monte Real	Leiria	1292	
Montoito	Redondo	1517	19th century
Moreira	Trancoso		
Moreira de Rei	Trancoso	1100s	1836
Mós	Torre de Moncorvo		19th century
Mouraz	Tondela	1198	1836
Mouronho	Tábua		
Muge	Salvaterra de Magos	1304	1837
Muxagata	Vila Nova de Foz Côa		19th century

== N ==
Former municipality	Parish(es) it included	Current municipality(ies)	Creation	Extinction
Nagosa		Moimenta da Beira		1834
Negrelos	São Tomé de Negrelos, São Mamede de Negrelos, Burgães (until 1853), Monte Córdova, Pena Maior, Rebordões, Refojos de Riba de Ave (until 1853), Roriz, São Martinho do Campo, São Miguel do Couto (until 1853), São Salvador do Campo and Vilarinho	Santo Tirso and Paços de Ferreira		1855, 24 October
Nogueira do Cravo		Oliveira do Hospital	1177	1836
Noudar		Barrancos		1825
Nozelos		Macedo de Cavaleiros		1836

== O ==
Former municipality	Parish(es) it included	Current municipality(ies)	Creation	Extinction
Odeceixe		Aljezur		
Óis da Ribeira		Águeda	1516	
Óis do Bairro		Anadia	1514	19th century
Olalhas		Tomar		
Olivais		Lisbon and Loures	1852	1886
Oliveira do Conde		Carregal do Sal	1286	
Oliveirinha		Tábua		
Olivença		occupied by Spain	1298	1801
Oriola		Portel	1282	1836
Ouguela		Campo Maior	Foral of Dinis I of 5 January 1298	1836
Outeiro		Bragança	1514	1853
Outil		Cantanhede		
Óvoa		Santa Comba Dão and Penacova		

== P ==
Former municipality	Current municipality(ies)	Creation	Extinction
Paçó	Vinhais	1312	1836
Paderne	Albufeira		
Padrões	Almodôvar and Castro Verde		
Paialvo	Tomar		1836
Paio de Pele	Vila Nova da Barquinha		
Panoias	Ourique		1836
Parada de Ester	Castro Daire		19th century
Parada do Pinhão	Sabrosa		1836
Parada do Bispo	Lamego		19th century
Parada de Bouro	Vieira do Minho		
Paradela (São Pedro das Águias)	Tabuaço		
Paredes da Beira	São João da Pesqueira	1000s	19th century
Passô	Moimenta da Beira		1834
Paus	Albergaria-a-Velha		
Pavia	Mora	1287	19th century
Pederneira	Nazaré	1514	1912
Pedrógão Pequeno	Sertã	20 October 1513	1834
Penajoia	Lamego		
Pena Verde	Aguiar da Beira	1240	1836
Penalva de Alva	Oliveira do Hospital		
Penas Roias	Mogadouro		19th century
Pendilhe	Vila Nova de Paiva		1834
Penela da Beira	Penedono	1055	1834
Penela do Minho	Ponte de Lima and Vila Verde	1514	1855
Penha Garcia	Idanha-a-Nova		
Pera Velha	Moimenta da Beira	1834	1834
Peral	Cadaval	10 July 1371	17 July 1371
Pereira	Montemor-o-Velho	1282	1836
Pereira Jusã	Ovar		19th century
Pernes	Santarém	1514	1855
Pias	Ferreira do Zêzere		
Pico de Regalados	Vila Verde	1513	24 October 1855
Pinheiro	Castro Daire		
Pinheiro de Ázere	Santa Comba Dão	1514	
Pinheiro da Bemposta	Oliveira de Azeméis	1514	24 October 1855
Pinheiro de Coja	Tábua		
Pinheiros	Tabuaço		
Pinhovelo	Macedo de Cavaleiros		1832
Podentes	Penela		19th century
Pombalinho	Soure		19th century
Pombeiro	Arganil	1513	1836
Porto Carreiro	Penafiel and Marco de Canaveses		1836
Pousaflores	Ansião		1836
Póvoa e Meadas	Castelo de Vide	1248	1836
Póvoa de Penela	Penedono		
Póvoa de Rio de Moinhos	Castelo Branco		
Póvoa de Santa Cristina	Montemor-o-Velho	1265	1834
Povolide	Viseu		
Povos	Vila Franca de Xira	1195	1836
Prado	Vila Verde, Barcelos and Braga	1260	24 October 1855
Praia	Santa Cruz da Graciosa	1540	1867
Préstimo	Águeda	1514	19th century
Proença-a-Velha	Idanha-a-Nova	1218	1836
Provesende	Sabrosa		1853
Pussos	Alvaiázere	1514	19th century

== Q ==
Former municipality	Parish(es) it included	Current municipality(ies)	Creation	Extinction
Queijada		Ponte de Lima		
Quiaios		Figueira da Foz		1836

== R ==
Former municipality	Parish(es) it included	Current municipality(ies)	Creation	Extinction
Rabaçal		Penela		1853
Raiva		Castelo de Paiva		
Ranhados		Mêda	1286	1836
Ranhados		Viseu		
Rates		Póvoa de Varzim	1517	1836
Real		Amarante		
Rebordainhos		Bragança		1836
Rebordãos		Bragança	1208	19th century
Rebordões		Ponte de Lima	1100s	19th century
Recardães		Águeda		
Redinha		Pombal	1159	1842
Redondos		Figueira da Foz	1561	1771
Refojos de Riba de Ave		Santo Tirso		1836
Reigada		Figueira de Castelo Rodrigo	1519	1836
Reriz		Castro Daire	1514	1834
Ribaldeira		Torres Vedras		24 October 1855
Ribeira de Soaz		Póvoa de Lanhoso, Terras de Bouro and Vieira do Minho	1515	1834
Rio de Moinhos		Sátão	1240	1836
Ronfe		Guimarães		1834
Rosmaninhal		Idanha-a-Nova	1510	1836
Rossas		Vieira do Minho	1510	1836
Rua		Moimenta da Beira and Sernancelhe		
Ruivães		Vieira do Minho		1853

== S ==
Former municipality	Parish(es) it included	Current municipality(ies)	Creation	Extinction
Sabugosa		Tondela		1836
Sagres		Vila do Bispo		1834
Salir de Matos		Caldas da Rainha	1514	
Salir do Porto		Caldas da Rainha	10 March 1515	
Salvaterra do Extremo	Salvaterra do Extremo, Monfortinho, Penha Garcia, Rosmaninhal, Segura, Toulões and Zebreira	Idanha-a-Nova	1229	1855, 24 October
Samodães		Lamego		
Samora Correia		Benavente	1300	1836
Sampaio		Vila Flor		
Sanceriz		Bragança		19th century
Sande		Lamego	1514	1836
Sandim		Vila Nova de Gaia		1834
Sandomil		Seia	1200s	1855
Sanfins		Cinfães	1514	1855
Sanfins do Douro		Alijó		1836
Sangalhos		Anadia	1514	1834
Sanguinheda		Arganil and Tábua	1513	1836
Santa Catarina		Caldas da Rainha	1349	1834
Santa Cristina do Couto		Santo Tirso		
Santa Cruz de Riba Tâmega	Real, Aião (until 1836), Ataíde, Banho^{(sa)}, Caíde de Rei (until around 1841–1855), Carvalhosa^{(sb)}, Castelões de Recezinhos, Constance (until 1853), Fregim (until 1853), Louredo (until 1853), Mancelos, Oliveira, Passinhos^{(sc)}, Santa Cristina de Figueiró, Santiago de Figueiró, Santo Isidoro (until 1853), São Mamede de Recezinhos, São Martinho de Recezinhos (until 1836), São Veríssimo (until 1836)^{(sd)}, Toutosa (until 1853), Travanca and Vila Caiz	Amarante, Lousada, Marco de Canaveses, Penafiel and Felgueiras	1513	1855, 24 October
Santa Eulália de Barrosas		Vizela and Felgueiras	1836	31 December 1855
Santa Marinha		Seia	1190	19th century
Santa Marta do Bouro		Amares and Terras de Bouro		24 October 1855
Santalha		Vinhais	1836	1853
Santo Varão		Montemor-o-Velho and Soure	1836	1853
São Cosmado		Armamar		24 October 1855
São Cristóvão de Nogueira		Cinfães		
São João da Foz do Douro		Porto		1836
São João de Areias		Santa Comba Dão	<1258	7 September 1895
São João de Rei		Póvoa de Lanhoso		
São João do Monte		Tondela		1855
São Lourenço do Bairro		Anadia	1514	1853
São Mamede de Ribatua		Alijó	1162	19th century
São Martinho de Mouros		Resende	1121	24 October 1855
São Martinho do Porto		Alcobaça		1855
São Miguel de Acha		Idanha-a-Nova		19th century
São Miguel do Outeiro		Tondela		1855
São Pedro da Cova		Gondomar	1820	1836
São Pedro de Farinha Podre		Penacova, Arganil and Tábua		31 December 1853
São Romão		Seia	1200s	1836
São Sebastião		Angra do Heroísmo	1503, 23 March (Alvará of Manuel I)	24 October 1855
São Sebastião da Feira		Oliveira do Hospital		
São Vicente da Beira		Castelo Branco	1195	1895
Sarzedas		Castelo Branco	1212	1836
Sarzedo		Covilhã		1836
Seda		Alter do Chão	1271	1836
Segadães		Águeda	1516	1836
Segura		Idanha-a-Nova	1510	1836
Seixo do Ervedal		Oliveira do Hospital		19th century
Seixo de Gatões		Montemor-o-Velho		
Semide		Miranda do Corvo		1853
Sendim		Tabuaço	1250	1836
Senhorim		Nelas	1140	1855
Serpins		Lousã	1514	1836
Sever		Moimenta da Beira		
Sezulfe		Macedo de Cavaleiros		1836
Silvã de Cima		Sátão		19th century
Silvares		Santa Comba Dão	<1258	1836
Silvares		Tondela		19th century
Sinde		Tábua	1514	
Soajo		Arcos de Valdevez	1514	
Soalhães		Marco de Canaveses		
Sobreira Formosa		Proença-a-Nova	1212	1855
Sobrosa		Paredes		1836
Sortelha		Sabugal	1288	1855
Sosa	Sosa and Vila Nova da Palhaça	Vagos	1514	1853, 31 December
Soutelo do Douro		São João da Pesqueira	1300s	1830
Souto		Penedono	3 February 1218	1834
Sul	Sul, Covas do Rio, Covelo de Paivô, Gafanhão, Pepim, Reriz and São Martinho das Moitas	São Pedro do Sul and Castro Daire	1200s	1855, 24 October

== T ==
Former municipality	Parish(es) it included	Current municipality(ies)	Creation	Extinction
Tabuado	Tabuado	Marco de Canaveses		1836, 6 November (transferred to the municipality of Soalhães)
Tancos	Tancos	Vila Nova da Barquinha		1836, 6 November
Tavares	Tavares, Abrunhosa-a-Velha, Chãs de Tavares, Freixiosa (until 1837), São João da Fresta and Travanca de Tavares	Mangualde	1114	1852, 10 February
Távora	Távora	Tabuaço		1836, 6 November
Teixeira	Teixeira	Baião	1514	1836, 6 November
Tendais	Tendais	Cinfães		1836, 6 November (transferred to the municipality of São Cristóvão de Nogueira)
Tentúgal	Tentúgal, Árvore, Lamarosa, Meãs do Campo, Póvoa Nova de Santa Cristina^{(ta)} and São Silvestre	Montemor-o-Velho and Coimbra	1108	1853, 31 December
Terena	Terena, Capelins and Santiago Maior	Alandroal	1262	1836, 6 November
Tibães	Mire de Tibães, Padim da Graça, Panóias, Parada de Tibães and São Paio de Merelim	Braga		1836, 6 November
Tolosa	Tolosa	Nisa		1836, 6 November
Topo	Topo and Santo Antão	Calheta	1510	1867
Torre de Dona Chama	Torre de Dona Chama, Agrochão (until 1853), Aguieiras, Ala (until 1853), Arcas, Bouça, Bousende^{(tb)}, Brinço (until 1853)^{(tc)}, Ervedosa (until 1853), Espadanedo, Ferreira, Fornos de Ledra^{(td)}, Fradizela, Guide^{(te)}, Lamalonga, Meles^{(tf)}, Murçós (until 1853), Múrias, Nozelos^{(tg)}, Quintas^{(th)}, Regodeiro^{(ti)}, Ribeirinha^{(tj)}, São Pedro Velho, Soutelo de Pena Mourisco, Vale de Gouvinhas, Vale de Prados^{(tk)}, Vale de Telhas, Vilar de Ouro^{(tl)}, Vilares^{(tm)}, Vilarinho de Agrochão and Vilarinho do Monte	Mirandela, Macedo de Cavaleiros and Vinhais	1287	1855, 24 October
Torrão	Torrão, Odivelas and Santa Margarida do Sádão^{(tn)}	Alcácer do Sal and Ferreira do Alentejo	1512	1836, 6 November
Torrão	Torrão	Marco de Canaveses		1836, 6 November (transferred to the municipality of Benviver)
Torrozelo	Torrozelo	Seia		1836, 6 November (transferred to the municipality of Sandomil)
Touça	Touça	Vila Nova de Foz Côa		1836, 6 November (transferred to the municipality of Freixo de Numão)
Tourém	Tourém	Montalegre		1836, 6 November
Touro	Vila do Touro, Quintas de São Bartolomeu and Rapoula do Côa	Sabugal	1200s	1836, 6 November
Trapa	Santa Cruz da Trapa	São Pedro do Sul		1836, 6 November
Travanca	Travanca	Amarante		1836, 6 November
Treixedo	Treixedo and Vila Nova da Rainha	Santa Comba Dão and Tondela		1836, 6 November
Trevões	Trevões, Castanheiro do Sul, Espinhosa, Pereiro, Paredes da Beira, Penela da Beira, Póvoa de Penela, Riodades, Valongo dos Azeites and Várzea de Trevões	São João da Pesqueira, Penedono and Tabuaço	1159	1855, 24 October
Trofa	Trofa	Águeda	1449	1836, 6 November (transferred to the municipality of Vouga)
Tuias	Tuias, Fornos, Freixo, Rio de Galinhas, São Nicolau and Sobre Tâmega	Marco de Canaveses		1836, 6 November (transferred to the municipality of Soalhães)
Turquel	Turquel	Alcobaça	1352	1836, 6 November

== U ==
Former municipality	Parish(es) it included	Current municipality(ies)	Creation	Extinction
Ucanha	Ucanha, Granja Nova, Salzedas and Vila Chã de Cangueiros	Tarouca		1836, 6 November (transferred to the municipality of Mondim da Beira)
Ulme	Ulme, Bemposta (until 1837), Chouto and Vale de Cavalos	Chamusca and Abrantes	1561	1855, 24 October
Unhão	Unhão, Alentém^{(ua)}, Lordelo, Macieira, Nogueira, Pedreira, Rande, Sernande, Torno, Vila Verde and Vilar do Torno^{(ub)}	Felgueiras and Lousada		1836, 6 November (transferred to the municipality of Barrosas)
Urmar	Urmar	Soure		1835, 18 July (transferred to the municipality of Samuel)

== V ==
Former municipality	Parish(es) it included	Current municipality(ies)	Creation	Extinction
Vacariça	Vacariça and Luso	Mealhada	1514	1837, 6 July
Valadares	Valadares, Alvaredo, Badim, Ceivães, Cousso, Cubalhão, Fiães (until 1836), Gave, Lamas de Mouro (until 1836), Messagães, Paderne (until 1836), Parada do Monte, Penso, Podame, Riba de Mouro, Sá, Segude and Tangil	Monção and Melgaço		24 October 1855
Valdigem		Lamego		19th century
Vale de Asnes		Mirandela		1830s
Vale de Nogueira		Bragança		19th century
Vale de Prados		Macedo de Cavaleiros		1836
Valença do Douro		Tabuaço	1514	1836
Valezim		Seia	1514	1836
Valhelhas	Valhelhas, Aldeia do Mato, Aldeia do Souto, Famalicão, Gonçalo, Sarzedo, Vale de Amoreira and Verdelhos	Guarda and Covilhã	1187	1855, 24 October
Valongo dos Azeites		São João da Pesqueira		1834
Várzea da Serra		Tarouca		1834
Várzea de Trevões		São João da Pesqueira		19th century
Veiros		Estremoz	1510	1855
Verride		Montemor-o-Velho		1853
Vide		Seia	1600s	1836
Vila Alva		Cuba		1836
Vila Boa de Roda		Vieira do Minho	1261	1832
Vila Boim		Elvas	1305	1836
Vila Chã		Vila Verde		1836
Vila Chã e Larim		Vila Verde	1836	1855
Vila Cova à Coelheira		Seia		
Vila Cova à Coelheira		Vila Nova de Paiva		19th century
Vila Cova de Sub-Avô		Arganil		1836
Vila da Ponte		Sernancelhe	1661	
Vila de Frades		Vidigueira		1854
Vila Fernando		Elvas		
Vila Flor		Nisa		
Vila Franca de Lampaças		Bragança	1286	
Vila Garcia		Terras de Bouro		19th century
Vila Nova da Barca		Montemor-o-Velho	1840	1844
Vila Nova da Erra		Coruche		1836
Vila Nova de Alvito (Vila Nova da Baronia)		Alvito	1280	1836
Vila Nova de Anços		Soure	1300s	1836
Vila Nova de Milfontes		Odemira	1486	1836
Vila Nova de Monsarros		Anadia		
Vila Nova de Souto d'El-Rei	Vila Nova de Souto d'El-Rei	Lamego	1700s	1836, 6 November
Vila Nova do Casal		Gouveia	1514	1836
Vila Pouca da Beira		Oliveira do Hospital		19th century
Vila Ruiva		Cuba		
Vila Seca		Armamar		19th century
Vila Verde de Ficalho		Serpa		1836
Vila Verde dos Francos		Alenquer	1160	
Vilar de Maçada		Alijó		1853
Vilar Maior		Sabugal	1296	1855
Vilar Seco de Lomba		Vinhais		19th century
Vilarinho da Castanheira		Carrazeda de Ansiães	1218	31 December 1853
Vilarinho do Bairro		Anadia	1515	19th century
Vilas Boas		Vila Flor		1836
Vimieiro		Arraiolos	1512	24 October 1855
Vimieiro		Braga	1517	
Vouga		Águeda		1853

== Z ==
Former municipality	Parish(es) it included	Current municipality(ies)	Creation	Extinction
Zambujal	Zambujal	Condeixa-a-Nova		1835, 18 July (transferred to the municipality of Rabaçal)
Zebreira	Zebreira	Idanha-a-Nova		1836, 6 November (transferred to the municipality of Salvaterra do Extremo)

== See also ==
- Concelho
- List of municipalities of Portugal

== Notes ==
^(aa) The parish of Sobreira was integrated into the parish of Candedo in 1936, losing its autonomy

^ca The parish of Duas Igrejas was integrated into the parish of Romariz sometime between 1855 and 1864, losing its autonomy

^cb The parish of Casal was integrated into the parish of Travancinha sometime before 1953, losing its autonomy

^(cc) The parish of Vila Meã da Raia was integrated into the parish of Vilarelho da Raia sometime between 1853 and 1864, losing its autonomy

^(sa) The parish of Banho was merged with the parish of Carvalhosa on 31 December 1936, forming Banho e Carvalhosa, losing its autonomy

^(sb) The parish of Carvalhosa was merged with the parish of Banho on 31 December 1936, forming Banho e Carvalhosa, losing its autonomy

^(sc) The parish of Passinhos was integrated into the parish of Vila Caiz in 1936, losing its autonomy

^(sd) The parish of São Veríssimo was integrated into the parish of São Gonçalo de Amarante in 1936, losing its autonomy

^(ta) The parish of Póvoa Nova de Santa Cristina was integrated into the parish of Tentúgal on 15 November 1841, losing its autonomy

^(tb) The parish of Bousende was integrated into the parish of Espadanedo on 16 November 1841, losing its autonomy

^(tc) The parish of Brinço was integrated into the parish of Ala sometime between 1855 and 1864, losing its autonomy

^(td) The parish of Fornos de Ledra was integrated into the parish of Lamalonga sometime between 1855 and 1864, losing its autonomy.

^(te) The parish of Guide was integrated into the parish of Avidagos on 31 December 1936, losing its autonomy. It was later transferred to the parish of Torre de Dona Chama

^(tf) The parish of Meles was integrated into the parish of Ala sometime between 1855 and 1864, losing its autonomy.

^(tg) The parish of Nozelos was integrated into the parish of Arcas on 16 November 1841, losing its autonomy.

^(th) The parish of Quintas was integrated into the parish of Vale de Gouvinhas on 16 November 1841, losing its autonomy.

^(ti) The parish of Regodeiro was integrated into the parish of Múrias on 16 November 1841, losing its autonomy.

^(tj) The parish of Ribeirinha was integrated into the parish of Fradizela on 16 November 1841, losing its autonomy.

^(tk) The parish of Vale de Prados was integrated into the parish of Múrias on 16 November 1841, losing its autonomy.

^(tl) The parish of Vilar de Ouro was integrated into the parish of São Pedro Velho sometime between 1855 and 1864, losing its autonomy.

^(tm) The parish of Vilares was integrated into the parish of Torre de Dona Chama on 16 November 1841, losing its autonomy

^(tn) The parish of Santa Margarida do Sádão was integrated into the parish of Figueira dos Cavaleiros on 31 December 1936, losing its autonomy

^(ua) The parish of Alentém was merged with the parish of Vilar do Torno in 1834, forming Vilar do Torno e Alentém, losing its autonomy

^(ub) The parish of Vilar do Torno was merged with the parish of Alentém in 1834, forming Vilar do Torno e Alentém, losing its autonomy
