= Tavares =

Tavares may refer to:

== Places ==
=== Brazil ===
- Tavares, Paraíba
- Tavares, Rio Grande do Sul
- Rodovia Raposo Tavares, the longest highway in São Paulo
- Tavares Bastos (favela), a favela in Rio de Janeiro, Brazil
- Tavares River

=== Jamaica ===
- Tavares Gardens, Kingston, Jamaica

=== Portugal ===
- Chãs de Tavares, Mangualde
- Travanca de Tavares, Mangualde
- Várzea de Tavares, Mangualde

=== United States ===
- Tavares, Florida
- Tavares, Orlando and Atlantic Railroad

== Other ==
- Tavares (group), an American soul music group
- Tavares (restaurant), one of the oldest restaurants in the world, in Lisbon, Portugal
- Tavares (surname)
- Tavares, a variety of limequat tree
- Tavares, a type of soil
