= João Rodrigues de Vasconcelos e Sousa, 2nd Count of Castelo Melhor =

Portuguese military officer and colonial administrator

His Lordship The Count of Castelo Melhor

Governor of the State of Brazil
- In office 10 March 1650 – 14 December 1654
- Monarch: João IV
- Preceded by: António Teles de Meneses, 1st Count of Vila Pouca de Aguiar
- Succeeded by: Jerónimo de Ataíde, 6th Count of Atouguia

Military Governor of the Minho Province
- In office 1643–1645
- Monarch: João IV
- Preceded by: Government Junta
- Succeeded by: Diogo de Melo Pereira (acting)
- In office 1646–1649
- Monarch: João IV
- Preceded by: Francisco de França Barbosa (acting)
- Succeeded by: D. Francisco de Azevedo e Ataíde

Military Governor of the Alentejo Province
- In office 1645–1646
- Monarch: João IV
- Preceded by: João Mendes de Vasconcelos (acting)
- Succeeded by: Matias de Albuquerque, Count of Alegrete

Personal details
- Born: 1593 Kingdom of Portugal
- Died: 13 November 1658 (aged 64–65) Ponte de Lima, Kingdom of Portugal
- Spouse: Mariana de Lancastre Vasconcelos e Câmara

Military service
- Allegiance: Kingdom of Portugal
- Years of service: 1640-1658
- Battles/wars: Portuguese Restoration War

João Rodrigues de Vasconcelos e Sousa, 2nd count of Castelo Melhor jure uxoris, was a Portuguese military officer and colonial administrator. He was lord of Valhelhas, Almendra, and Mouta Santa, and held the offices of alcaide-mor and comendador of Pombal, alcaide-mor of Penamacor, governador das armas (military governor) of the provinces of Entre-Douro-e-Minho and Alentejo, and member of the Council of War.

On the death of his brother, he succeeded in the House of Vasconcelos and in the claim to marry the heiress of the House of Castelo Melhor, by virtue of a clause in the former's last will and testament. He distinguished himself with patriotism during the period of the Portuguese Restoration War. When João IV of Portugal was proclaimed king, he undertook an ultimately unsuccessful but widely celebrated effort, along with D. Rodrigo Lobo and other noblemen, to return to his country the Portuguese galleys anchored in Cartagena. Once his plan was discovered by the Spanish, he was arrested along with some of his co-conspirators, stoicly resisting the suffering imposed upon him in order to not denounce his remaining accomplices. When he was being returned in custody to Castile, Dutch corsairs rescued him at the request of King João IV, and led him back to Portugal.

Welcomed with honours by the new monarch, he was appointed to the offices of Military Governor of the Provinces of Minho and Alentejo, as well as to a seat in the Council of War.

He left Lisbon on November 4, 1649, at the command of the first Fleet of the General Commerce Company of Brazil, as appointed Governor-General of Brazil, having as his second-in-command admiral Pedro Jacques de Magalhães, future Viscount of Fonte Arcada. He took office in Bahia on January 4, 1650.

Returning to Portugal, and accompanied by his son, Luís de Vasconcelos e Sousa, he still fought in the 1658 campaign of the Portuguese Restoration War against the Spanish dominion over the Kingdom of Portugal.
