= Diogo Dias Melgás =

17th-century Portuguese composer

Diogo Dias Melgás (often Melgaz) (Cuba (Portugal), 1638 - Évora, 1700) was a Portuguese composer of late-Renaissance sacred polyphony.

== Life ==
Diogo Dias Melgás was born in Cuba, Alentejo, on 14 April 1638. He was a choirboy at the Colégio da Claustra in Évora in 1646. He took holy orders at the Cathedral of Évora, where he stayed the rest of his life, being a student of Manuel Rebelo, and holding the position of mestre de capela for about 30 years. He died blind and extremely poor on 3 February 1700. He was the last of the great Portuguese polyphonic masters, who began to flourish in Évora in the second half of the 16th century.

== Work ==
A large part of Melgás's work is lost. The surviving works - masses, motets, graduals - are kept in the archives of the Cathedrals of Évora and Lisbon, and were published in modern notation by the Fundação Calouste Gulbenkian in 1978 (Opera Omnia, Portugaliae Musica XXXII).

== Recordings ==
- 1994, Music of the Portuguese Renaissance, Pro Cantione Antiqua, Hyperion CDA66715
  - includes 14 works by Melgás
- 2004, A Golden Age of Portuguese Music, The Sixteen, CORO COR16020
  - includes 3 works by Melgás
- 2008, The Golden Age, The King's Singers, Signum Classics
  - includes 2 works by Melgás
