= Vila Caiz =

- Civil parish
- Parish Church of Vila Caiz

- Coordinates: 41.2353°N 8.1483°W
- Country: Portugal
- Region: Norte
- District: Porto
- Municipality: Amarante

Area
  - Total: 8.52 km^{2} (3.29 sq mi)

Population (2021)
  - Total: 2,849
  - Density: 334/km^{2} (866/sq mi)
- Time zone: UTC+00:00 (WET)
  - Summer (DST): UTC+01:00 (WEST)
- Website: https://www.vilacaiz.pt/

Vila Caiz is a civil parish (freguesia) in the municipality of Amarante, in the Porto District of northern Portugal. Covering an area of 8.52 km², it had a population of 2,849 inhabitants at the 2021 census.

Vila Caiz is situated in the southwestern part of the municipality, near the boundary with Marco de Canaveses. The parish is crossed by the Tâmega River and includes several settlements, among them Vilarinho and Coura.

== History ==
=== Origins and historical administration ===
The name Vila Caiz has traditionally been associated with the Arabic word cafiz (also written cahiz), a historical unit of capacity used for measuring agricultural products, particularly grain. According to the parish's historical account, the term was connected with the payments made to local landowners.

Historically, Vila Caiz was a honra, a type of feudal territorial jurisdiction, and was associated with the former municipality of Santa Cruz de Riba Tâmega. It belonged to the lords of the parish of Unhão, in the territory of present-day Felgueiras.

Until 1855, Vila Caiz had its own municipal buildings, including a town hall, a prison and a pillory, as well as local administrative authorities. Despite these institutions, it was not the seat of the municipality of Santa Cruz de Riba Tâmega, which was based in Vila Meã.

=== Archaeological heritage ===
At Castelo Velho, the parish's historical account records the existence of an ancient hillfort (castro), traditionally associated with several local legends and unusual rock formations. These include the Penedo da Moura, Penedo da Janela, Penedo da Cabrita and Penedo da Gruta.

A burial site of Lusitanian-Roman attribution was identified at Vilarinho. Discovered in 1908, the necropolis was destroyed in 1909 during construction work associated with the Tâmega railway line, which crossed the archaeological site.

== Geography ==
Vila Caiz is located approximately 12 kilometres southwest of the municipal centre of Amarante, close to the boundary with the municipality of Marco de Canaveses. Its landscape is characterised by pronounced variations in elevation, with the Tâmega River running through its lower-lying areas, particularly around Vilarinho and Passinhos.

The higher elevations include the area around the Sanctuary of Nossa Senhora da Graça and the Serra de Santa Cruz. The local terrain is predominantly granitic.

== Heritage ==
=== Parish Church ===
The Parish Church of Vila Caiz (Igreja Matriz de Vila Caiz) is dedicated to Saint Michael. Its present building dates from the 18th century.

The 19th-century writer José Augusto Vieira described the parish church in his work O Minho Pittoresco (1886), noting its well-maintained condition and 18th-century construction.

=== Sanctuary of Nossa Senhora da Graça ===
The Chapel of Nossa Senhora da Graça stands on an elevated point near the boundary with Marco de Canaveses. Its origins are uncertain, although historical accounts associate the sanctuary with hermits who lived there in earlier centuries.

According to José Augusto Vieira, the sanctuary had an elegant entrance gallery and was described as an attractive religious building in 1721. It subsequently fell into disrepair before being restored through the efforts of the priest António Augusto Pinto de Magalhães in the 19th century.

=== Other landmarks ===
Other religious and historical buildings in the parish include the Chapel of São Pedro in Coura and the Chapel of São Julião in Passinhos.

== Transport ==
Vila Caiz was served by the former Tâmega railway line, which connected Livração with Amarante. The railway station of Vila Caiz was located in Vilarinho and was one of the intermediate stations along the route. The railway also crossed the area of the Vilarinho necropolis during its construction in the early 20th century.

== Demographics ==
According to the Portuguese censuses, Vila Caiz experienced substantial population growth during the 20th century, followed by a decline after 1991.

Historical population
Year	Population
1864	828
1878	885
1890	1,118
1900	1,171
1911	1,287
1920	1,275
1930	1,500
1940	1,783
1950	1,877
1960	2,121
1970	2,411
1981	2,832
1991	3,071
2001	3,398
2011	3,026
2021	2,849

The decline in population since the 1990s has occurred alongside the wider demographic changes affecting rural areas of northern Portugal.

== Culture and recreation ==
The parish has several cultural, recreational and sporting associations, including the Grupo Cultural e Desportivo de Vila Caiz, which is involved in local football and youth sports.

Other organisations include the Rancho Folclórico de Vilarinho, dedicated to traditional folk culture, the Grupo de Bombos de Vila Caiz, associated with traditional percussion music and festivities, and the Centro de Ofícios e Artes Tradicionais (COART), which promotes traditional crafts and cultural activities.

== Festivities ==
The main religious celebrations in Vila Caiz include:

- Feast of Nossa Senhora da Graça, held on the first Sunday of August.
- Feast of São Julião, in Passinhos, celebrated in January.
- Feast of Saint Michael, celebrated on 29 September.
