= Turquel =

- Civil parish
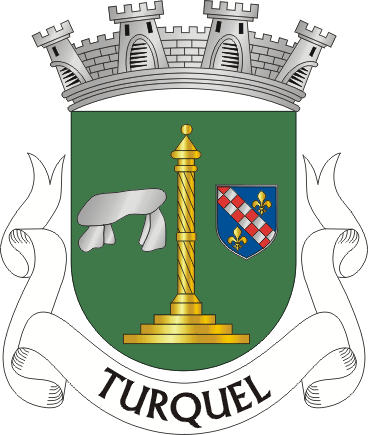
- Coat of arms

- Location in Portugal
- Coordinates: 39.463889°N 8.9775°W
- Country: Portugal
- Region: Centro
- District: Leiria
- Municipality: Alcobaça

Area
  - Total: 40.57 km^{2} (15.66 sq mi)

Population (2011)
  - Total: 4,561
  - Density: 112.4/km^{2} (291.2/sq mi)
- Time zone: UTC+00:00 (WET)
  - Summer (DST): UTC+01:00 (WEST)
- Website: turquel.freguesias.pt

Turquel is a civil parish in the municipality of Alcobaça, Portugal. The population in 2011 was of 4,561 people, in 2021 it was down to 4,439.
