= Urmar =

Village in Soure, Portugal

Coordinates: 40°04′25″N 8°41′10″W

- Village
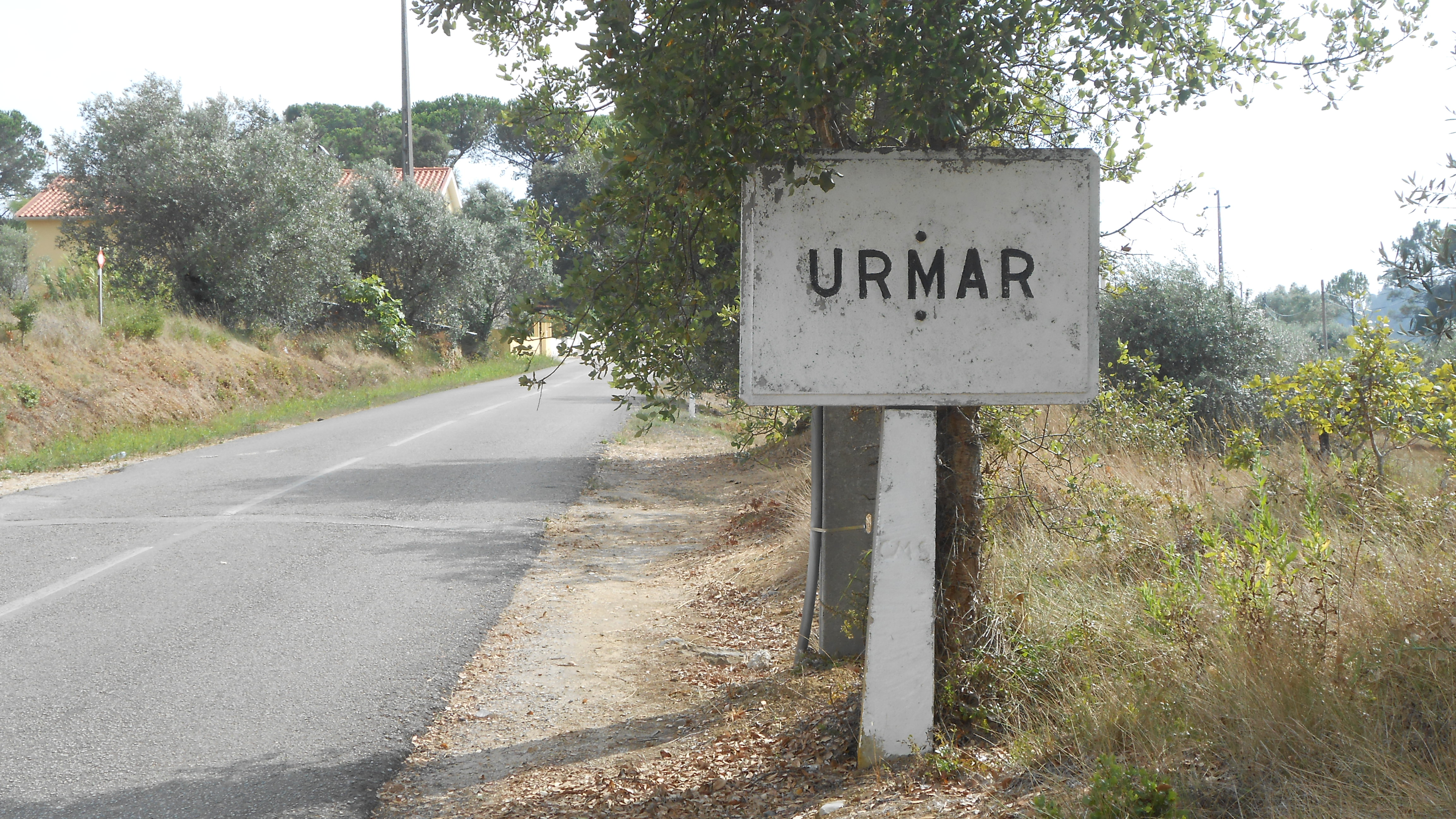
- Road sign at the entrance of the village
- Interactive map of Urmar
- Country: Portugal
- District: Coimbra
- Municipality: Soure
- Parish: Samuel
- Time zone: UTC (WET)
  - Summer (DST): UTC+1 (WEST)

Urmar is a village in the Portuguese parish of Samuel, in the municipality of Soure.

== History ==
Human presence around the Urmar area dates to at least the Roman period, since a Roman road ran through here, and a bridge from it still exists. According to unconfirmed speculation, there was a castle in Urmar from the early Middle Ages onwards, which is said to have been converted into a monastery by monks from the Monastery of Santa Cruz in Coimbra, where it is said to have fallen victim to an Arab raid in 1190 during the Reconquista. Near the village of Urmar, there are as yet unidentified remains of a castle or fortress, which may well have been the monastery in question.

In the Middle Ages, Urmar became the administrative centre of its own district. The stone cross in the village that can be seen today is thought to have been formed from the village’s original pillory, which was erected in 1520 as a symbol of its town privileges.

Urmar subsequently lost importance, while the nearby town of Samuel gradually gained influence. Following the various administrative reforms introduced in the aftermath of the Liberal Revolution of 1820, the concelho, or municipality, of Urmar was dissolved on 18 July 1835 and incorporated into the municipality of Samuel, and, at nearly the same time, Urmar also lost its remaining administrative autonomy, including its status as a parish.

The municipality of Samuel was itself dissolved on 6 November 1836, after which Urmar was incorporated into the municipality of Abrunheira. Following the dissolution of Abrunheira on 7 October 1844, Urmar was transferred to the municipality of Verride. This municipality was subsequently dissolved on 31 December 1853, and Urmar, by then already incorporated into the parish of Samuel, was transferred to the municipality of Soure, to which it has belonged ever since.

== Points of interest ==
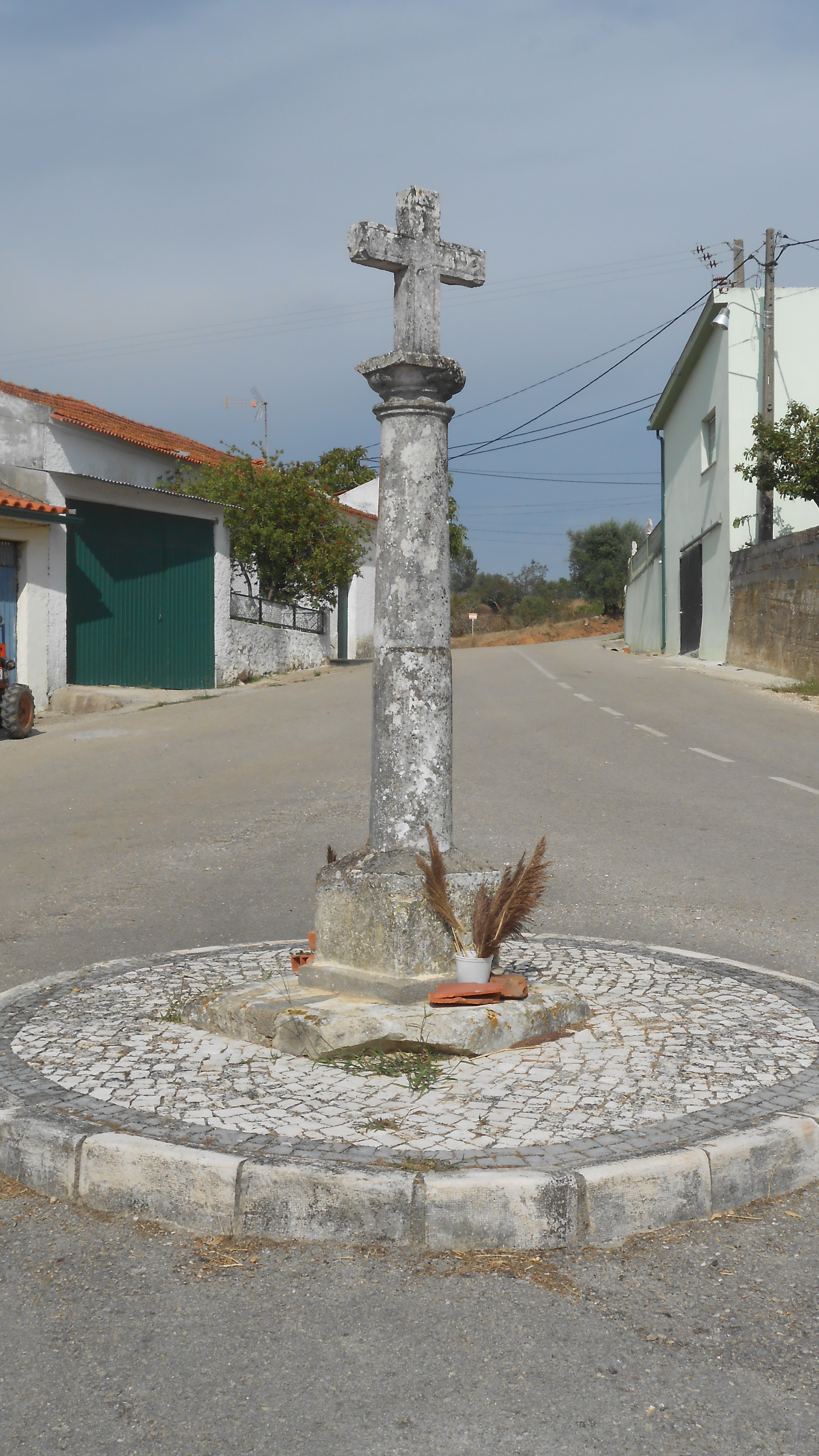
The Urmar calvary seen in 2013

- Urmar calvary
