= Cuba, Portugal =

Vila de Cuba
- Municipality
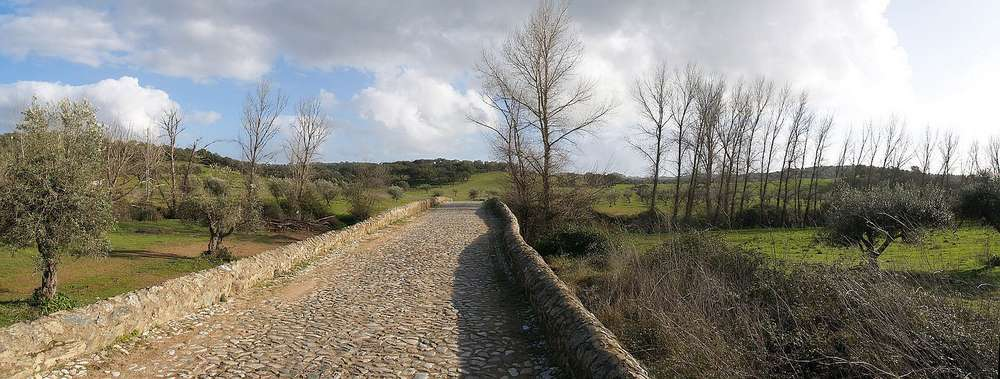
- Roman bridge over Odivelas stream

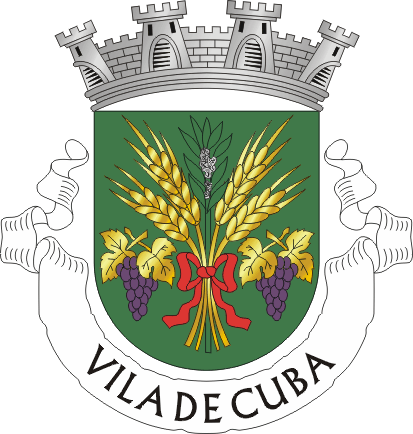
- Flag Coat of arms
- Interactive map of Vila de Cuba
- Location in Portugal
- Coordinates: 38°09′N 7°53′W
- Country: Portugal
- Region: Alentejo
- Intermunic. comm.: Baixo Alentejo
- District: Beja
- Parishes: 4

Government
  - President: João Português (CDU)

Area
  - Total: 172.09 km^{2} (66.44 sq mi)

Population (2011)
  - Total: 4,878
  - Density: 28.35/km^{2} (73.41/sq mi)
- Time zone: UTC+00:00 (WET)
  - Summer (DST): UTC+01:00 (WEST)
- Local holiday: April 24
- Website: www.cm-cuba.pt

Cuba (European Portuguese pronunciation: [ˈkuβɐ]), officially the Town of Cuba (Portuguese: Vila de Cuba), is a town and municipality in the District of Beja in Portugal. The population in 2011 was 4,878, in an area of 172.09 km^{2}.

The current mayor (since 2013) is João Português. The municipal holiday is Monday after Easter.

== History ==
The name "Cuba" is likely of Arabic origin, pertaining to the qubba, that is cupola or domed tombs of ascetic spiritual leaders. Such toponyms are frequent in Southern Portugal and likely related to the Sufi movements that flourished during the period of Almoravid decay, such as the one led by Ibn Qasi.

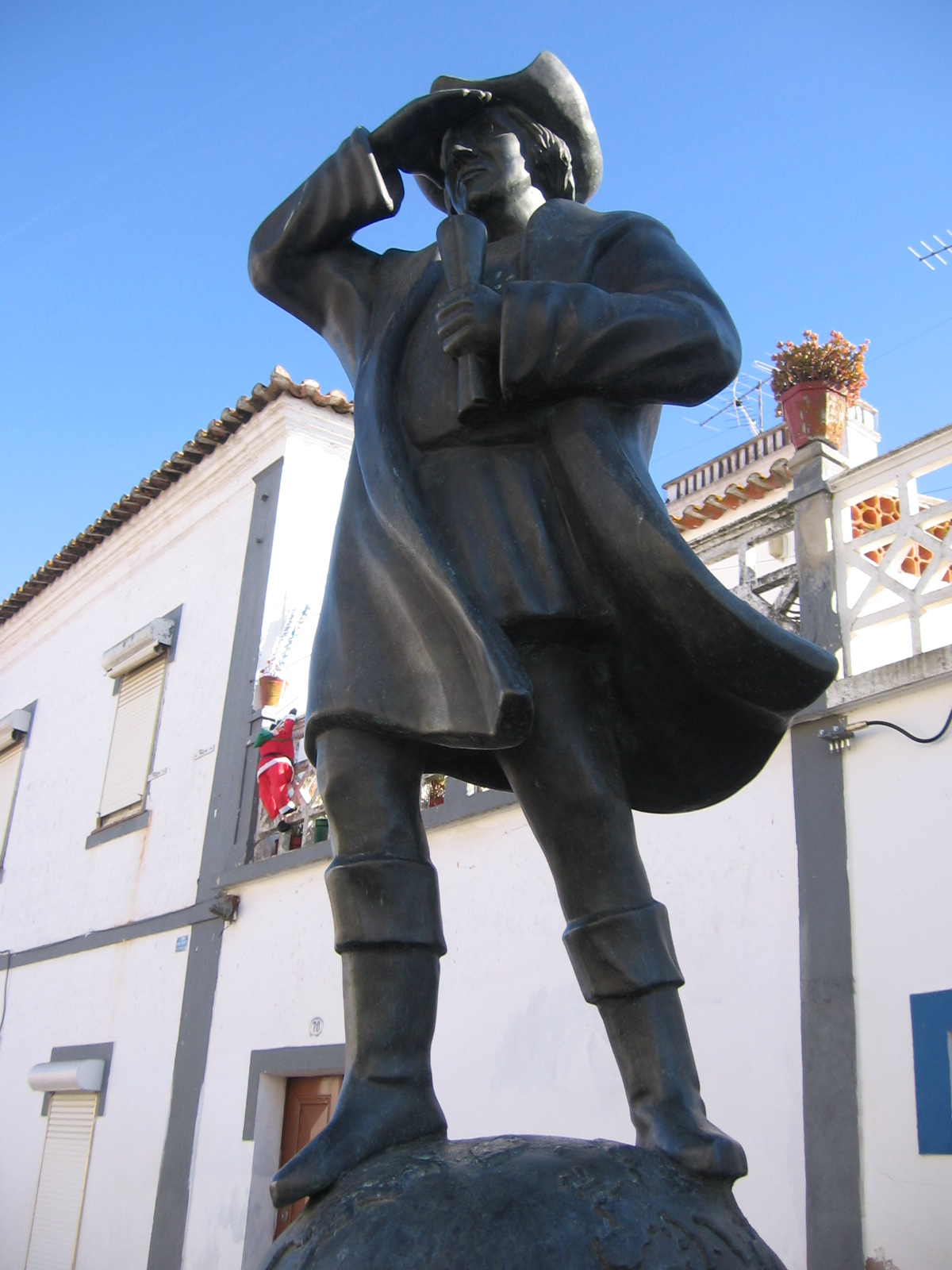
Statue of Columbus in Cuba

In the 20th century, a small number of scholars sought to ascribe Portuguese origins to Christopher Columbus. One of these attempts had him born in the town of Cuba, after which he would have named the Caribbean island (see possible birthplace of Christopher Columbus). A statue honouring the explorer can be seen in the city centre.

== Parishes ==
Administratively, the municipality is divided into four civil parishes (freguesias):

- Cuba
- Faro do Alentejo
- Vila Alva
- Vila Ruiva

== Notable people ==
- Diogo Dias Melgás (1638 in Cuba, Alentejo - 1700) a Portuguese composer of late-Renaissance sacred polyphony.
