= Sul, Portugal =

Parish in São Pedro do Sul , Portugal

Sul
- Civil parish
- Calvary of Sul in 2012

- Coat of arms

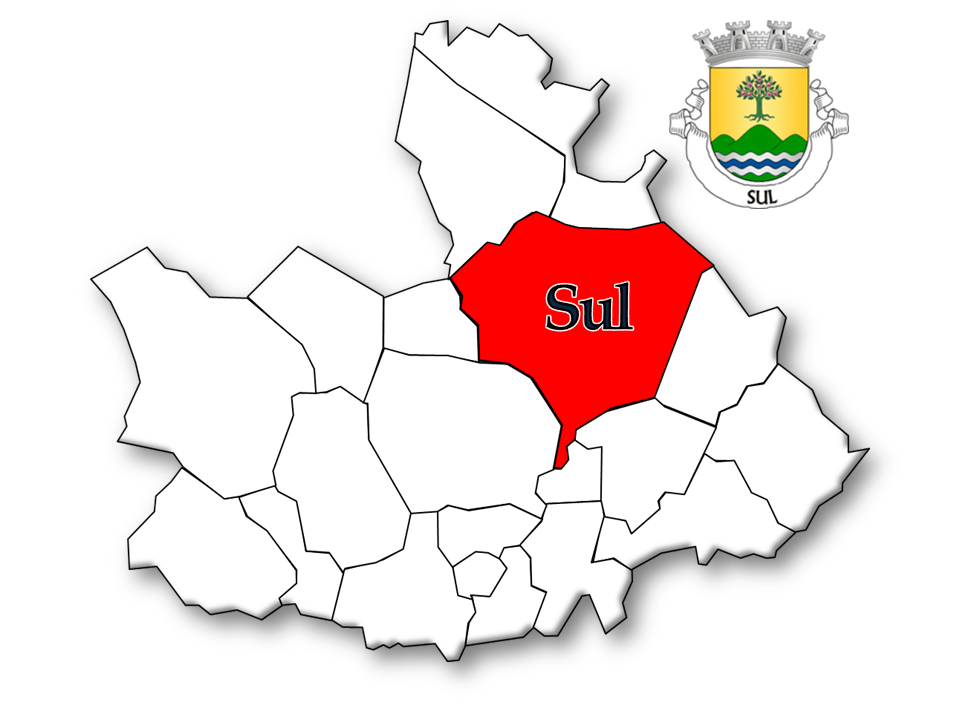
- Location within São Pedro do Sul
- Coordinates: 40°50′5″N 8°2′33″W
- Country: Portugal
- Region: Centre
- Intermunic. comm.: Dão-Lafões
- District: Viseu
- Municipality: São Pedro do Sul

Area
  - Total: 47.48 km^{2} (18.33 sq mi)

Population (2021)
  - Total: 878
  - Density: 18.5/km^{2} (47.9/sq mi)
- Time zone: UTC+00:00 (WET)
  - Summer (DST): UTC+01:00 (WEST)
- Patron: Saint Adrian
- Website: https://www.freguesiasul.pt

Sul is a Portuguese village and the administrative centre of the parish of Sul in the municipality of São Pedro do Sul. The parish covers an area of 47.48 km² and has a population of 878 (2021 census), giving it a population density of 18.5 inhabitants per km².

Sul was a market town and the seat of a municipality, which consisted solely of the town itself. It was a municipality from the 13th century until 24 October 1855. On 6 November 1836, the municipalities of Alva, Gafanhão and Reriz were abolished, and the boundaries of Vouzela were altered. As a result, the parishes of Covas do Rio, Covelo de Paivô, Gafanhão, Pepim, Reriz and São Martinho das Moitas were incorporated into the municipality of Sul. At the time of its extinction, the municipality had a population of 5,342 and covered an area of 166 km².

== Demography ==
The population registered in the census was:

Population of the parish of Sul
Year	Pop.	±%
1864	2,303	—
1878	2,458	+6.7%
1890	3,159	+28.5%
1900	2,636	−16.6%
1911	2,625	−0.4%
1920	2,407	−8.3%
1930	2,530	+5.1%
1940	2,427	−4.1%
1950	2,931	+20.8%
1960	2,741	−6.5%
1970	2,338	−14.7%
1981	1,957	−16.3%
1991	1,619	−17.3%
2001	1,409	−13.0%
2011	1,090	−22.6%
2021	878	−19.4%

Distribution of the population by age groups
Year	0-14	15-24	25-64	> 65
2001	132	145	624	508
2011	78	85	483	444
2021	64	51	348	415
