= Padim da Graça =

- Civil parish
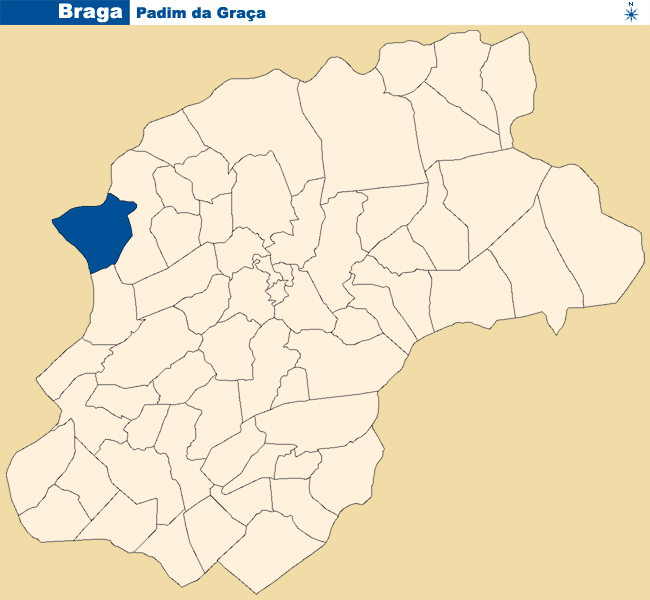
- Coordinates: 41.567°N 8.489°W
- Country: Portugal
- Region: Norte
- Intermunic. comm.: Cávado
- District: Braga
- Municipality: Braga

Area
  - Total: 3.39 km^{2} (1.31 sq mi)

Population (2011)
  - Total: 1,521
  - Density: 449/km^{2} (1,160/sq mi)
- Time zone: UTC+00:00 (WET)
  - Summer (DST): UTC+01:00 (WEST)
- Postal code: 4700

Padim da Graça is a Portuguese parish, located in the municipality of Braga. The population in 2011 was 1,521, in an area of 3.39 km^{2} (1.31 sq mi).

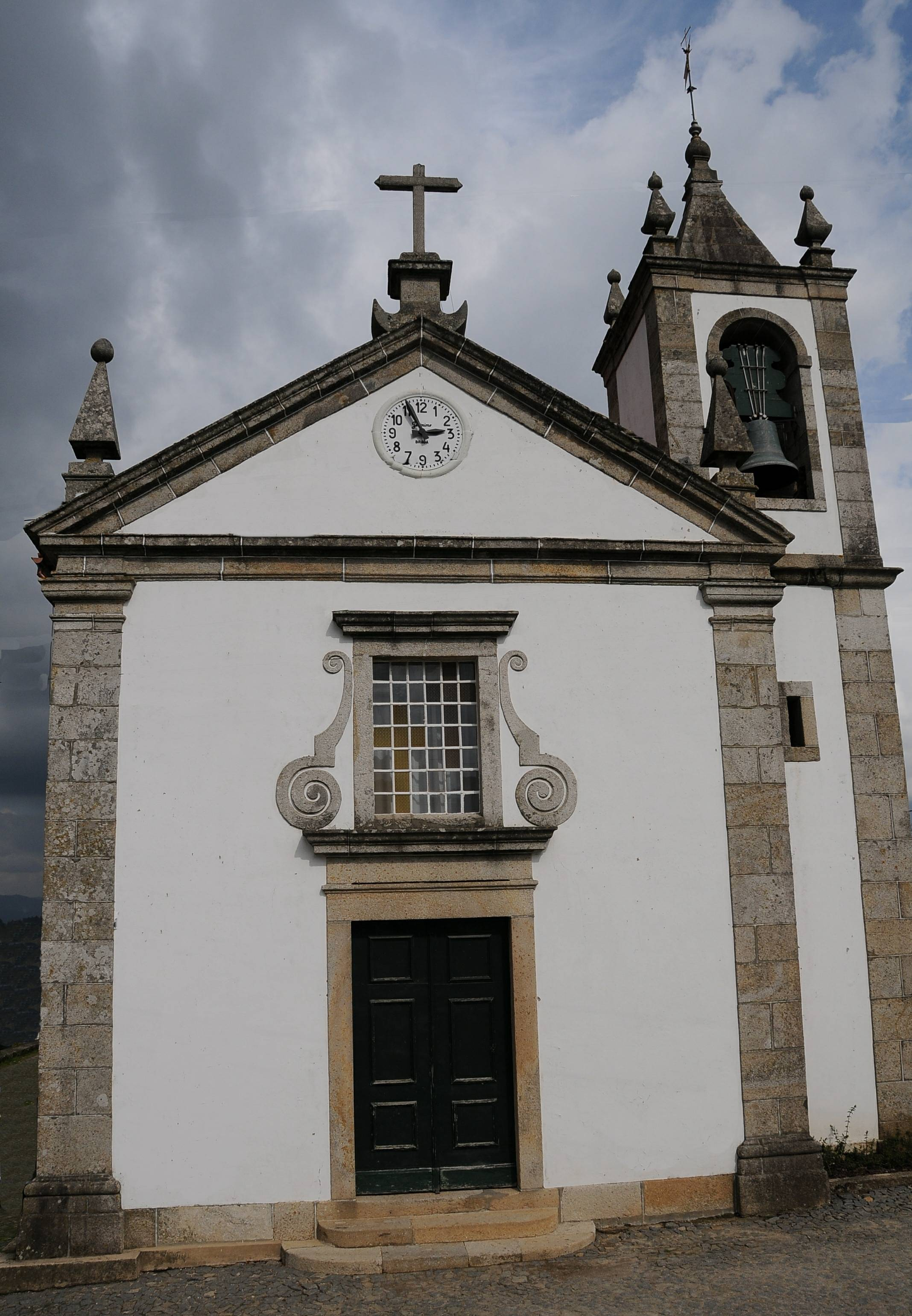
Padim da Graça Church
