= Faro do Alentejo =

- Civil parish
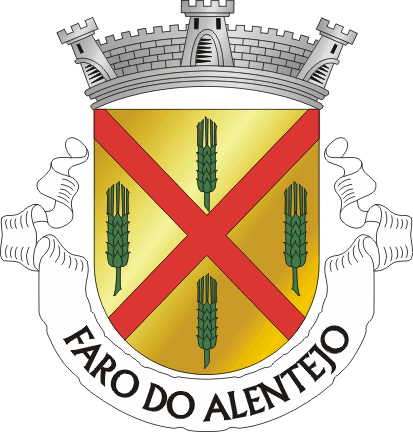
- Coat of arms

- Location in Portugal
- Coordinates: 38.1503°N 7.9444°W
- Country: Portugal
- Region: Alentejo
- Intermunic. comm.: Baixo Alentejo
- District: Beja
- Municipality: Cuba

Area
  - Total: 53.68 km^{2} (20.73 sq mi)

Population (2001)
  - Total: 591
  - Density: 11.0/km^{2} (28.5/sq mi)
- Time zone: UTC+00:00 (WET)
  - Summer (DST): UTC+01:00 (WEST)

Faro do Alentejo is a Portuguese civil parish (Freguesia) within the municipality of Cuba. The population in 2011 was 741, in an area of 44.68 km^{2}.

It also used to be known as Farinho (which in Portuguese means "small Faro").
