= Vouga, Portugal =

Human settlement in Portugal

Coordinates: 40°38′N 8°28′W

Vouga
- Village
- Interactive map of Vouga
- Country: Portugal
- Municipality: Águeda
- Parish: Lamas do Vouga
- Former municipality: Dissolved in 1853

Vouga was a former municipality located near the Vouga River. It included the freguesias of Valongo do Vouga, Agadão, Castanheira do Vouga, Lamas do Vouga, Macieira de Alcôba, Macinhata do Vouga, Préstimo, Segadães, Talhadas, Trofa and Valmaior, in Águeda Municipality, Portugal. Vouga was a town and seat of a municipality dissolved in 1853. The freguesias that were part of the Vouga municipality are part of the modern day municipalities of Águeda, Albergaria-a-Velha and Sever do Vouga.
