= Mire de Tibães =

- Civil parish
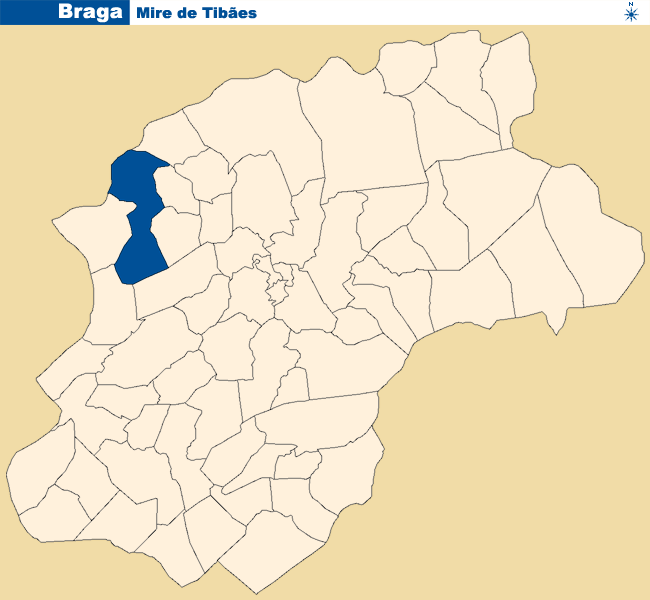
- Coordinates: 41.567°N 8.479°W
- Country: Portugal
- Region: Norte
- Intermunic. comm.: Cávado
- District: Braga
- Municipality: Braga

Area
  - Total: 4.36 km^{2} (1.68 sq mi)

Population (2011)
  - Total: 2,437
  - Density: 559/km^{2} (1,450/sq mi)
- Time zone: UTC+00:00 (WET)
  - Summer (DST): UTC+01:00 (WEST)

Mire de Tibães is a Portuguese parish, located in the municipality of Braga. The population in 2011 was 2,437, in an area of 4.36 km^{2} (1.68 sq mi). In Tibães is located the famous Monastery of Tibães, founded in the 6th century and now owned by the government.
