= Abiul =

- Civil parish
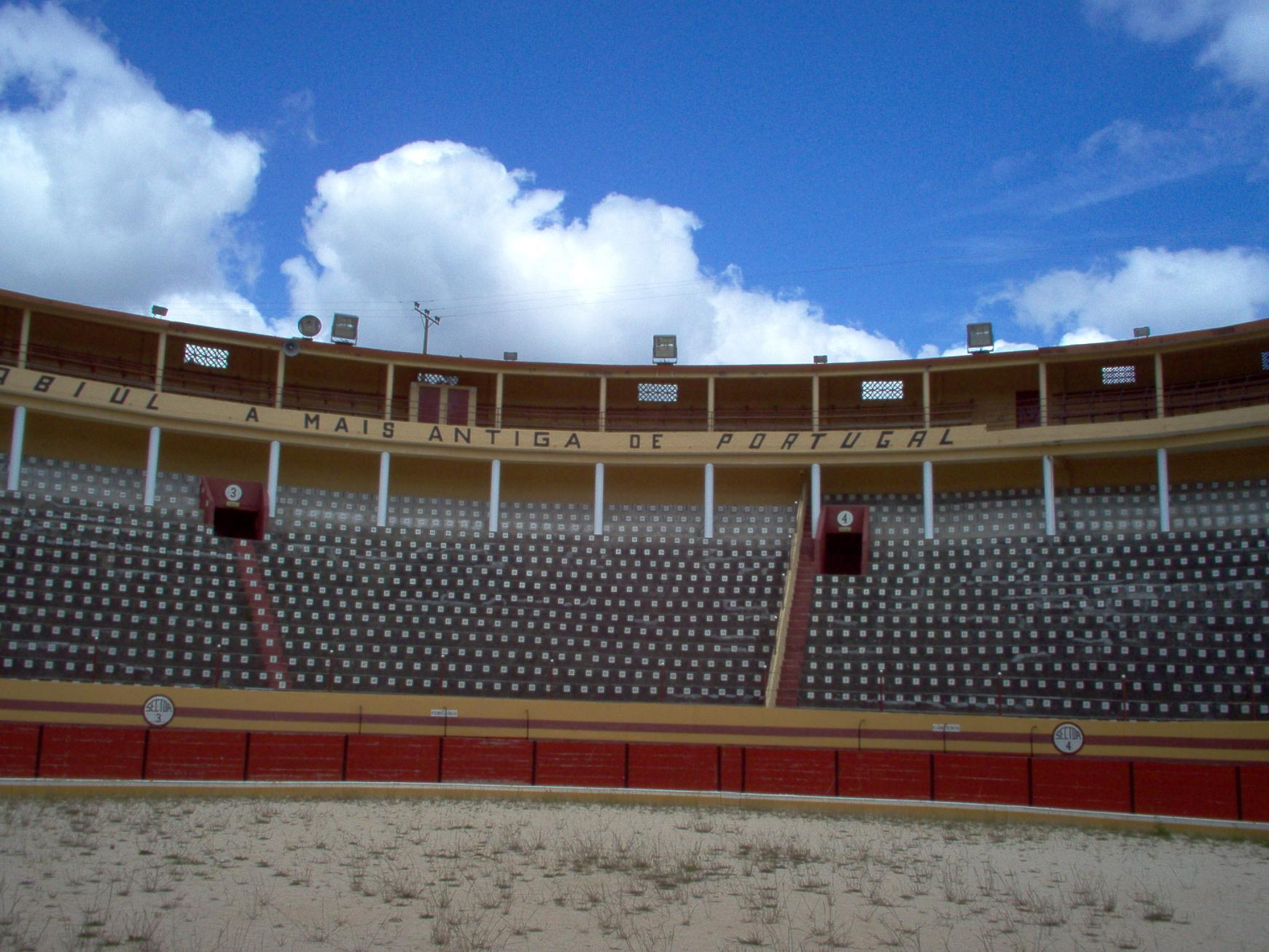
- Bullring of Abiul

- Location in Portugal
- Coordinates: 39°52′25.0″N 8°32′19.0″W
- Country: Portugal
- Region: Centro
- Intermunic. comm.: Região de Leiria
- District: Leiria
- Municipality: Pombal

Area
  - Total: 53.16 km^{2} (20.53 sq mi)

Population (2011)
  - Total: 2,729
  - Density: 51.34/km^{2} (133.0/sq mi)
- Time zone: UTC+00:00 (WET)
  - Summer (DST): UTC+01:00 (WEST)
- Patron: Nossa Senhora das Neves

Abiul, is a Portuguese "freguesia" (Portuguese civil parish) of Pombal municipality.

== History ==
During the black plague, "Abiulenses" (the name given to their locals) asked for Nossa Senhora das Neves' help, promising an annual festive in her honour.

The festival consists of a procession, music, local merchandise, dance, and a bullfight.

== Population ==
Population of Abiul
1864	1878	1890	1900	1911	1920	1930	1940	1950	1960	1970	1981	1991	2001	2011
2 410	2 710	2 937	3 388	3 623	3 771	4 172	4 751	5 190	5 180	4 711	3 845	3 217	3 090	2 729
