= Travancinha =

- Civil parish
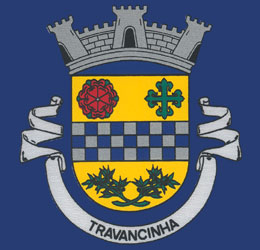
- Coat of arms

- Location in Portugal
- Coordinates: 40.424°N 7.829°W
- Country: Portugal
- Region: Centro
- Intermunic. comm.: Beiras e Serra da Estrela
- District: Guarda
- Municipality: Seia

Area
  - Total: 12.47 km^{2} (4.81 sq mi)

Population (2011)
  - Total: 472
  - Density: 38/km^{2} (98/sq mi)
- Time zone: UTC+00:00 (WET)
  - Summer (DST): UTC+01:00 (WEST)

Travancinha is a village and parish in the Portuguese Seia Municipality. The population in 2011 was 472, in an area of 12.47 km^{2}.
