= Famalicão (Guarda) =

- Civil parish
- Location in Portugal
- Coordinates: 40.444°N 7.377°W
- Country: Portugal
- Region: Centro
- Intermunic. comm.: Beiras e Serra da Estrela
- District: Guarda
- Municipality: Guarda

Area
  - Total: 16.02 km^{2} (6.19 sq mi)

Population (2011)
  - Total: 615
  - Density: 38.4/km^{2} (99.4/sq mi)
- Time zone: UTC+00:00 (WET)
  - Summer (DST): UTC+01:00 (WEST)

Famalicão is a parish (freguesia) in the municipality of Guarda in Portugal. The population in 2011 was 615, in an area of 16.02 km^{2}.
