= Vidual =

- Civil parish
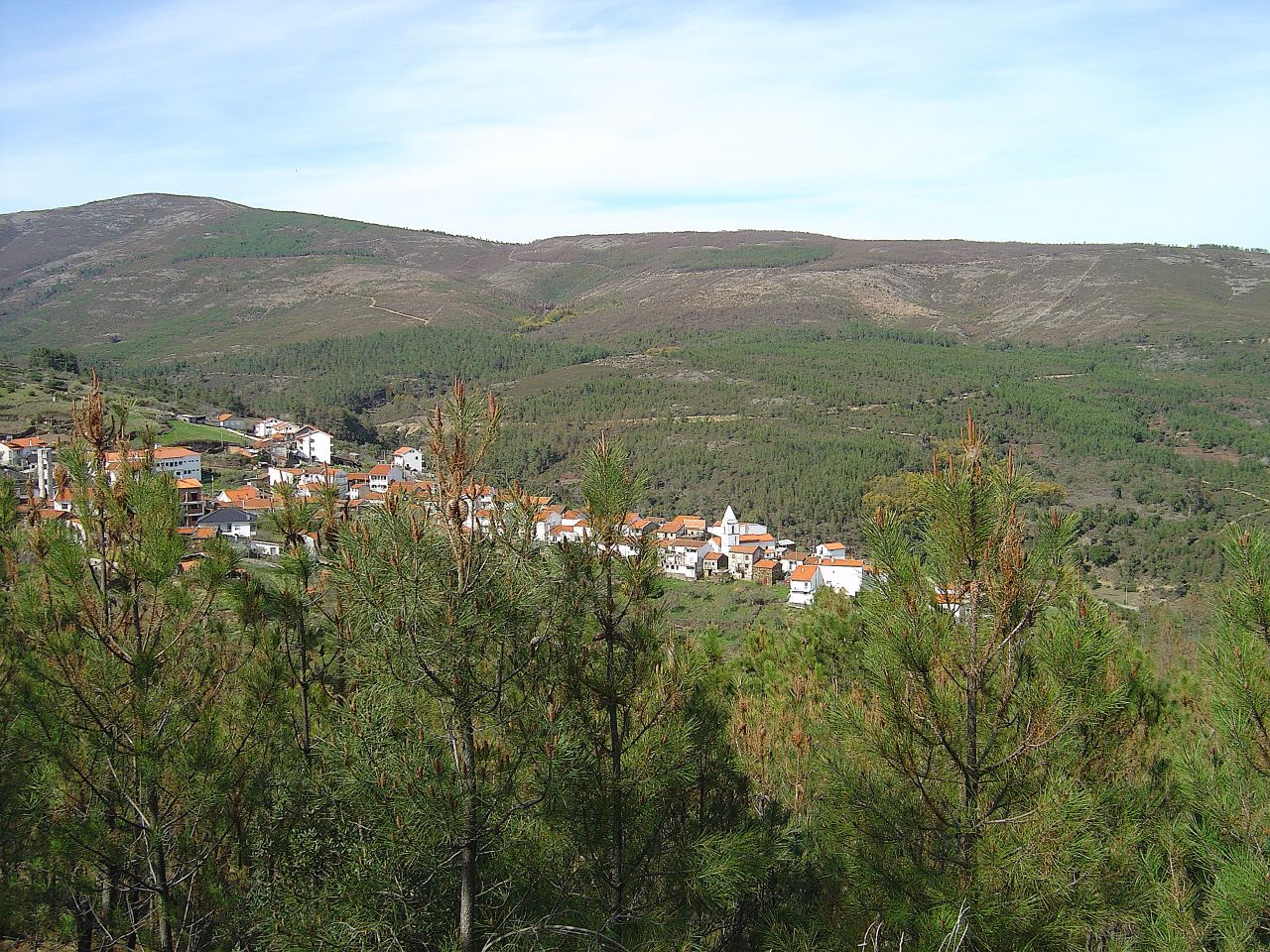
- Vidual seen in 2005

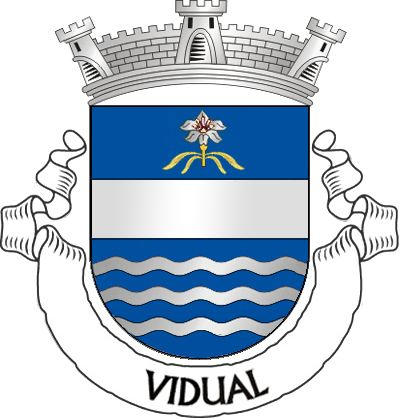
- Coat of arms

- Location in Portugal
- Coordinates: 40°06′43″N 7°52′17″W
- Country: Portugal
- Region: Centro
- Intermunic. comm.: Região de Coimbra
- District: Coimbra
- Municipality: Pampilhosa da Serra
- Disbanded: 2013

Area
  - Total: 13.82 km^{2} (5.34 sq mi)

Population (2011)
  - Total: 84
  - Density: 6.1/km^{2} (16/sq mi)
- Time zone: UTC+00:00 (WET)
  - Summer (DST): UTC+01:00 (WEST)

Vidual, sometimes known as Vidual de Cima, is a town and a former freguesia of Portugal located in the municipality of Pampilhosa da Serra. It had 13.82km² of area and 84 inhabitants (2011). Its population density is of 6.1hab per km².

It was extinct in 2013, as part of a national administrative reform, being merged with the parish of Fajão to form a new parish named Fajão - Vidual.

The entire forest surrounding this village was completely burned down in the June 2017 Portugal wildfires.

== Population ==
Population of the parish of Vidual
1864	1878	1890	1900	1911	1920	1930	1940	1950	1960	1970	1981	1991	2001	2011
379	422	446	475	485	529	442	721	377	336	244	171	107	93	84
