= Arcas (Macedo de Cavaleiros) =

- Civil parish
- Location in Portugal
- Coordinates: 41.646°N 7.035°W
- Country: Portugal
- Region: Norte
- Intermunic. comm.: Terras de Trás-os-Montes
- District: Bragança
- Municipality: Macedo de Cavaleiros

Area
  - Total: 23.01 km^{2} (8.88 sq mi)
- Elevation: 433 m (1,421 ft)

Population (2011)
  - Total: 262
  - Density: 11/km^{2} (29/sq mi)
- Time zone: UTC+00:00 (WET)
  - Summer (DST): UTC+01:00 (WEST)
- Postal code: 5340
- Area code: 278
- Website: http://arcas.jfreguesia.com/

Arcas is a Portuguese civil parish in the municipality of Macedo de Cavaleiros in the northeast corner of Portugal. The population in 2011 was 262, in an area of 23.02 km^{2}.

== History ==
Little is known as to the parish's founding, although its toponymic name may refer to the existence of megalithic funerary monuments located within its territory. A legend suggests that these funerary structures existed on the site that the current church, dedicated to the Divino Senhor dos Passos, is erected.

Its geographic isolation, due to its high relief, morphological obstacles and extreme climate was always a factor that prevented large human settlements. Regardless, the territory came under Roman occupation, which imposed a modernizing influence on to the Celto-iberian tribes that forged in the region.

With the influence of feudal nobility, such as Bragançãos, the jurisdiction was slowly populated. In 1284, a foral (charter) was bestowed on Nozelos by King Denis.

== Geography ==
Arcas, parish of the municipality of Macedo de Cavaleiros, in the old district of Bragança, is situated on a fertile valley near the Serra de Bornes.

It is constituted by two settlements (Nozelos and Morgão), and surrounded by the neighbouring parishes of Vilarinho de Agrochão, Murçós, Ferreira, Corujas, Ala and Vilarinho do Monte.

The community has two schools that provide primary education.

== Economy ==
The primary sector dominates the economic activities of its inhabitants, which primarily associated with subsistence agriculture. This includes fruit orchards (cherry, grape, figs), olive trees and vineyards, as well as cork, in addition to cattle herding for milk and/or meat. The secondary sector is related to these essential industries, including the production of olive oil, but also include iron and aluminium metallurgy. Commercial activities are limited to a store and market.

== Architecture ==
=== Civic ===
- Manor of Arcas (Portuguese: Solar das Arcas), the 18th century manorhouse was built by Admiral Pessanha, and maintained by the Pessenha family, consisting of a two-storey high, long symmetrical house dominated by flourished Baroque era windows and massive main portal with family arms
- Pillory of Nozelas (Portuguese: Pelourinho de Nozelas), the pillory marked local authority, and was constructed sometime during the 15th century. Owing to Arcas' being a patron and fief of the House of Braganza, its design was based on a typical form employed by the hereditary nobility to mark their authority.

=== Religious ===
- Chapel of Santa Rita (Portuguese: Capela da Santa Rita)
- Chapel of Senhor dos Passos (Portuguese: Capela do Senhor dos Passos)
- Church of Nossa Senhora da Assunção (Portuguese: Igreja Paroquial de Nozelos/Igreja de Nossa Senhora da Assunção), constructed in the 16th century, and patronized by the affluent families of the House of Braganza, resulting in a two-belfrey building, but was also supported by annual rents of 20$000 to 30$000 réis
- Church of Santa Catarina (Portuguese: Igreja Paroquial de Arcas/Igreja de Santa Catarina)

== Notable citizens ==
- Manuel de Almeida Pessanha (20 August 1825 - 15 January 1871), a politician, Civil Governor of Bragança (in 1858), and Peer-of-the-Realm (in 1863);
- João Manuel de Almeida Morais Pessanha (3 February 1843 - 22 June 1905), priest, military chaplain, and Knight of the Order of Aviz;
- Francisco de Assis Pereira do Lago (8 January 1844 - 4 February 1914), the Viscount of Arcas, politician and Civil Governor of Bragança (in 1886)
