= Merelim (São Paio), Panoias e Parada de Tibães =

- Civil parish
- Location in Portugal
- Coordinates: 41.585°N 8.469°W
- Country: Portugal
- Region: Norte
- Intermunic. comm.: Cávado
- District: Braga
- Municipality: Braga

Area
  - Total: 5.36 km^{2} (2.07 sq mi)

Population (2011)
  - Total: 5,363
  - Density: 1,000/km^{2} (2,590/sq mi)
- Time zone: UTC+00:00 (WET)
  - Summer (DST): UTC+01:00 (WEST)
- Postal code: 4700-940

Merelim (São Paio), Panoias e Parada de Tibães is a civil parish in the municipality of Braga, Portugal. It was formed in 2013 by the merger of the former parishes Merelim (São Paio), Panoias and Parada de Tibães. The population in 2011 was 5,363, in an area of 5.36 km^{2} (2.07 sq mi).

The parish is situated on the south bank of the river Cávado, northwest of Braga city centre. Agriculture is very important in Merelim São Paio, a village full of fields of maize and little plantations. However, the agriculturists in Merelim São Paio are getting older and there are few young people following the same way.

== Gallery ==
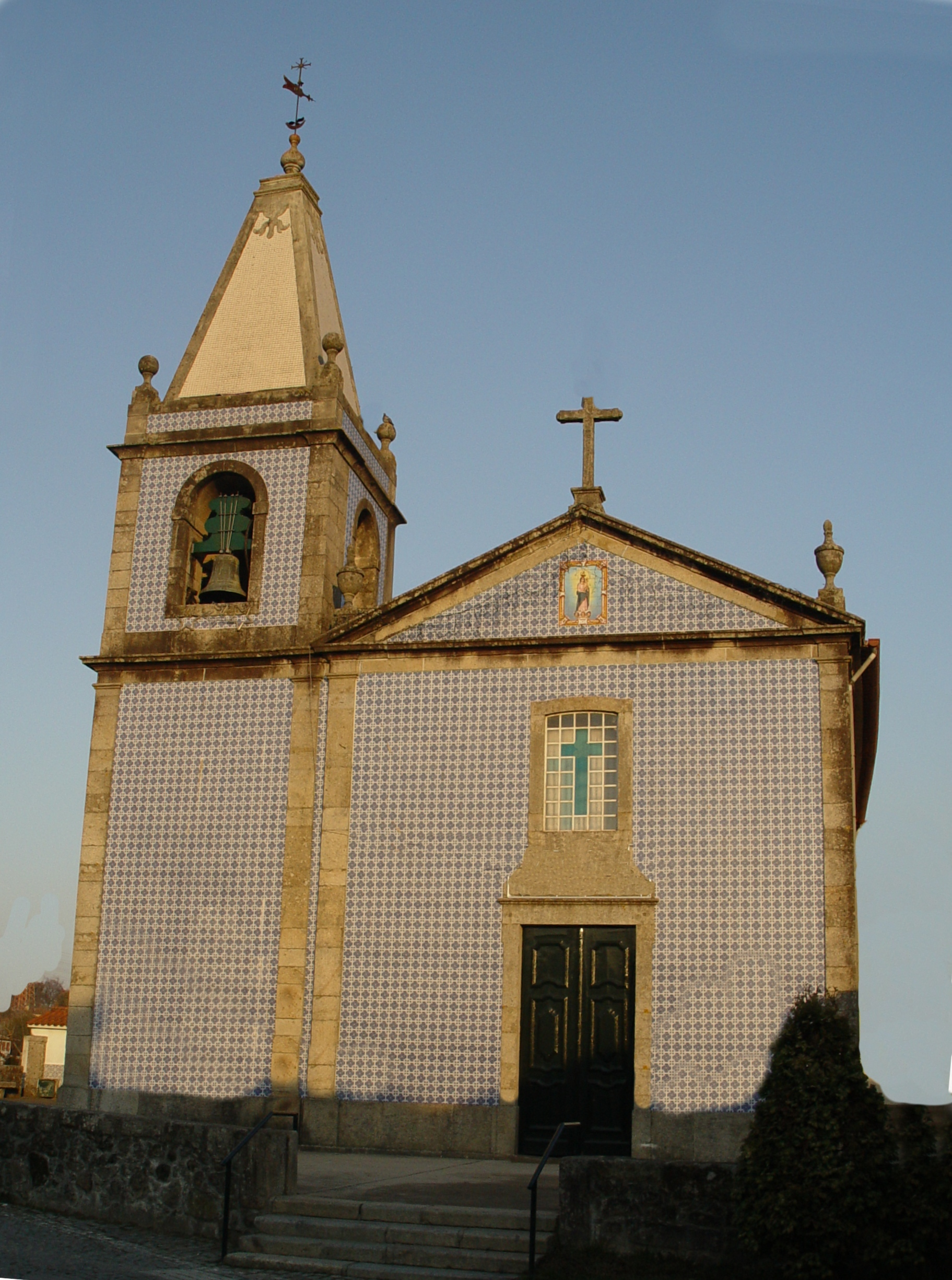
Panoias Church

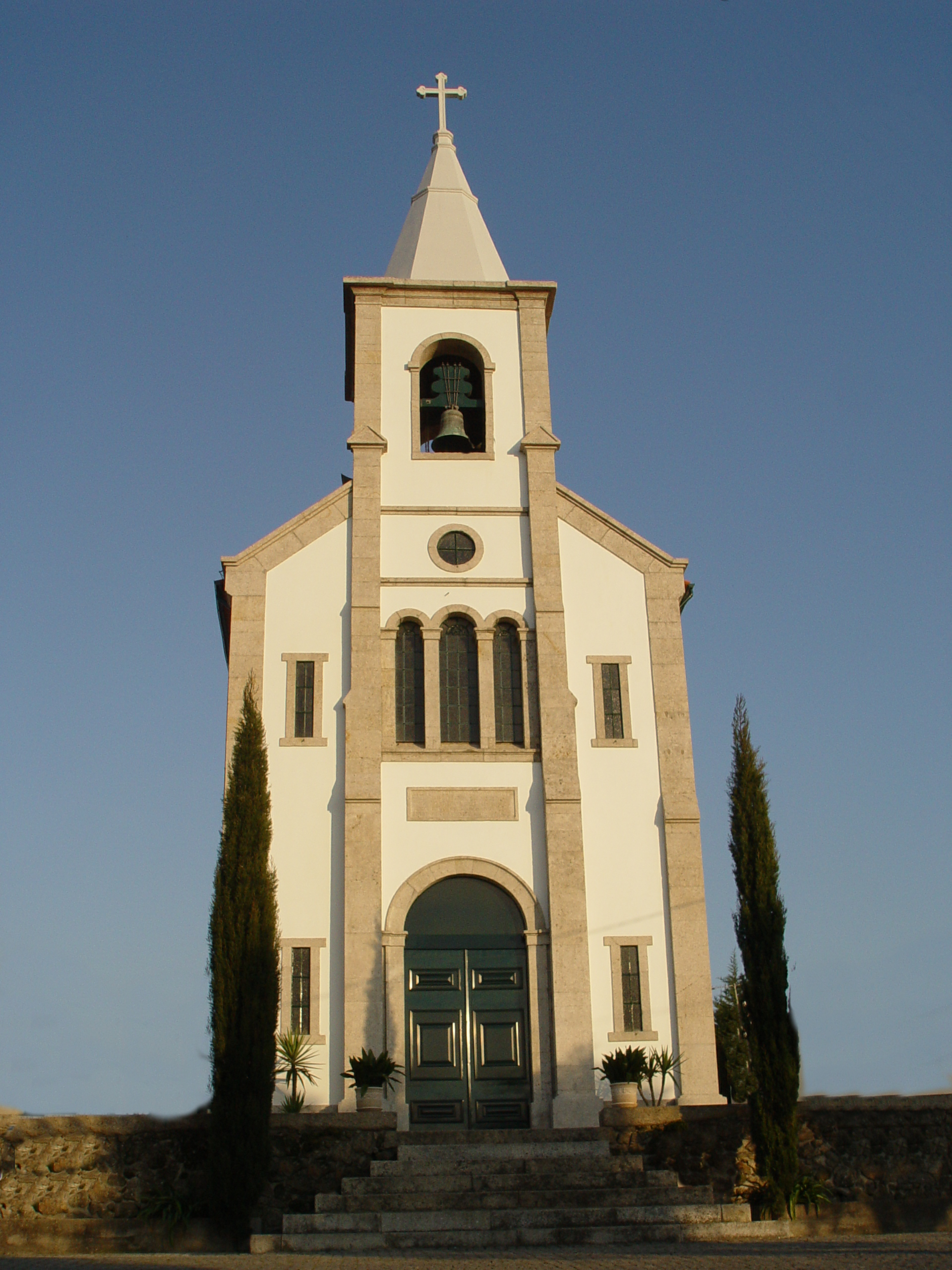
Parada de Tibães Church
