= Romariz =

Civil parish in Portugal

- Civil parish
- Location in Portugal
- Coordinates: 40.943°N 8.458°W
- Country: Portugal
- Region: Norte
- Metropolitan area: Porto
- District: Aveiro
- Municipality: Santa Maria da Feira

Area
  - Total: 11.08 km^{2} (4.28 sq mi)

Population (2011)
  - Total: 3,023
  - Density: 272.8/km^{2} (706.6/sq mi)
- Time zone: UTC+00:00 (WET)
  - Summer (DST): UTC+01:00 (WEST)

Romariz is a Portuguese parish, located in the municipality of Santa Maria da Feira. The population in 2011 was 3,023, in an area of 11.08 km^{2}. It is the home of Romariz F.C.
