= Sosa, Portugal =

Parish in Vagos, Portugal

Sosa
- Civil parish
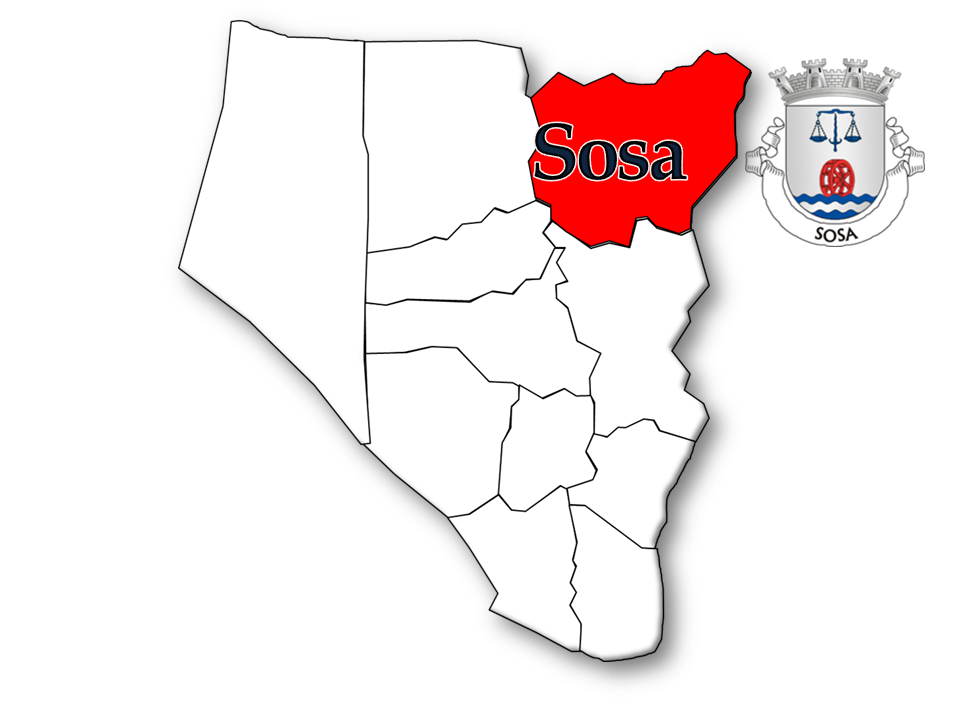
- Sosa seen inside the Vagos municipality

- Location in Portugal
- Coordinates: 40°32′46″N 8°39′40″W
- Country: Portugal
- Region: Centro
- Intermunic. comm.: Região de Aveiro
- District: Aveiro
- Municipality: Vagos

Area
  - Total: 22.03 km^{2} (8.51 sq mi)

Population (2011)
  - Total: 3,069
  - Density: 139.3/km^{2} (360.8/sq mi)
- Time zone: UTC+00:00 (WET)
  - Summer (DST): UTC+01:00 (WEST)

Sosa, also known as Soza, is a village and a civil parish of the municipality of Vagos, Portugal. The population in 2011 was 3,069, in an area of 22.03 km^{2}.

It was a town and municipality between 1514 and 1853. It consisted of a single parish and, in 1801, had a population of 3864. Following the administrative reforms at the dawn of the liberal era, the parish of Vila Nova da Palhaça, which had previously belonged to Esgueira, was annexed to it. In 1849, it had a population of 4228.
