= Tavares, Paraíba =

Coordinates: 7°38′09″S 37°52′40″W

- Municipality
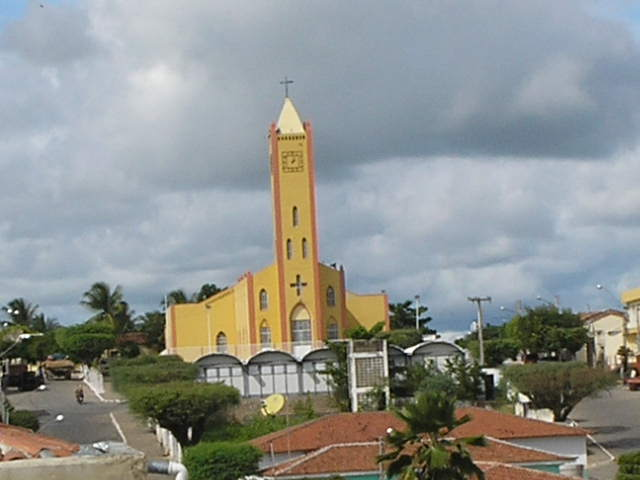

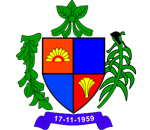
- Flag Coat of arms
- Interactive map of Tavares, Paraíba
- Country: Brazil
- Region: Northeast
- State: Paraíba
- Mesoregion: Sertao Paraibana

Population (2020)
  - Total: 14,759
- Time zone: UTC−3 (BRT)

Tavares, Paraíba is a municipality in the state of Paraíba in the Northeast Region of Brazil.

== See also ==
- List of municipalities in Paraíba
