= Torrozelo =

Former civil parish in central Portugal

- Civil parish
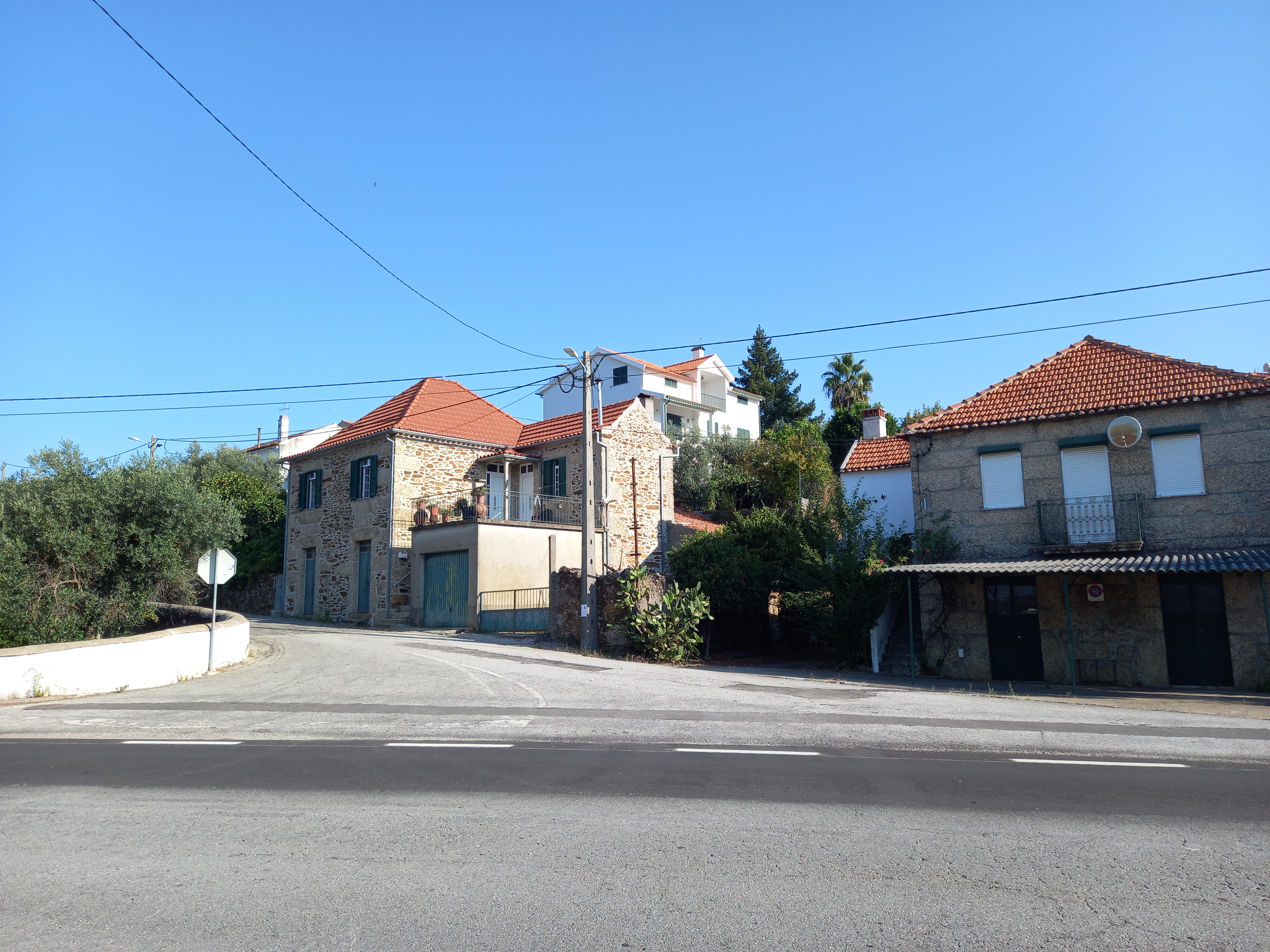
- Torrozelo in 2024

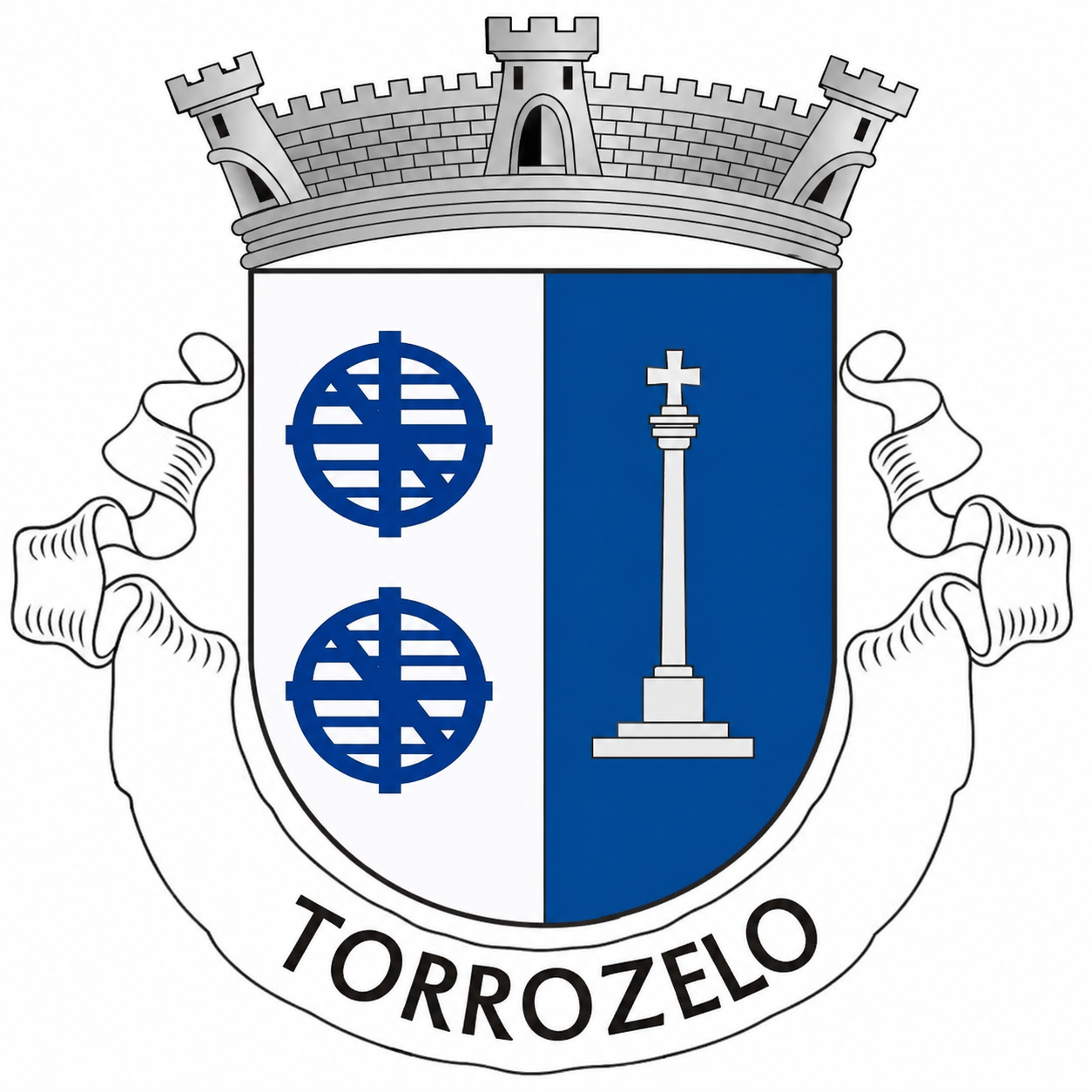
- Coat of arms

- Location in Portugal
- Coordinates: 40°23′10″N 7°45′37″W
- Country: Portugal
- Region: Centre
- Intermunic. comm.: Beiras e Serra da Estrela
- District: Guarda
- Municipality: Seia
- Disbanded: 28 January 2013

Area
  - Total: 4.97 km^{2} (1.92 sq mi)

Population (2011)
  - Total: 481
  - Density: 96.8/km^{2} (251/sq mi)
- Time zone: UTC+00:00 (WET)
  - Summer (DST): UTC+01:00 (WEST)
- Postal code: 6270-555
- Patron: Our Lady of the Rosary

Torrozelo, also known as Torroselo, is a Portuguese settlement in the municipality of Seia, in the former province of Beira Alta, the Central Region, and the Serra da Estrela subregion. It was the seat of the now-defunct Freguesia of Torrozelo, which covered an area of 4.97 km^{2} and had a population of 481 (2011), and a population density of 96.8 inhabitants per km^{2}.

In 2013, the Freguesia of Torrozelo was merged with the Freguesia of Folhadosa, creating the Freguesia of Torrozelo and Folhadosa.

== History ==
The first documented mention of this settlement dates back to 1150. There is also a document granted to Torrozelo in the late 12th century by D. João Teotónio, prior of the Monastery of Santo Cruz de Coimbra.

Torrozelo received a foral granted by King Manuel I on 15 May 1514.

Beginning with the reign of King Manuel I, the parish of Torrozelo came to have its own judicial system and by the 19th century, Torrozelo was its own concelho, with its town council consisting of an ordinary civil judge, a councilman, and a prosecutor. It was abolished by the Decree of 6 November 1836, and became part of the municipality of Sandomil, which also was later abolished by the decree of 24 October 1855, and incorporated into Seia.

Two particularly notable inaugurations took place in Torrozelo, the introduction of electric lighting on 14 July 1935, and the parish house in August 1965.

The first Portuguese horror film, ‘’Blood Curse‘’, was filmed in Torrozelo in 2006.

== Population ==
Population of the parish of Torrozelo
	1864	1878	1890	1900	1911	1920	1930	1940	1950	1960	1970	1981	1991	2001	2011
Total	757	761	815	805	790	770	667	842	772	734	717	625	618	528	481

Population by age groups in 2001 and 2011
0–14 years	15–24 years	25–64 years	65+ years
61 | 44	85 | 40	275 | 254	107 | 143
-28%	-53%	-8%	+34%
