= Freixo de Numão =

- Civil parish
- Location in Portugal
- Coordinates: 41.067°N 7.222°W
- Country: Portugal
- Region: Norte
- Intermunic. comm.: Douro
- District: Guarda
- Municipality: Vila Nova de Foz Côa

Area
  - Total: 36.35 km^{2} (14.03 sq mi)

Population (2011)
  - Total: 609
  - Density: 17/km^{2} (43/sq mi)
- Time zone: UTC+00:00 (WET)
  - Summer (DST): UTC+01:00 (WEST)

Freixo de Numão is a civil parish in the municipality of Vila Nova de Foz Côa, Portugal. The population in 2011 was 609, in an area of 36.35 km^{2}.

== Climate ==
Freixo de Numão has a Mediterranean climate with even precipitation throughout the year, a rare tendency in the climate of Portugal, though not even enough to be classified as oceanic or humid subtropical.

Climate data for station 07N/05UG, Freixo de Numão, 1982-2009, altitude: 563 m (1,847 ft)
Month	Jan	Feb	Mar	Apr	May	Jun	Jul	Aug	Sep	Oct	Nov	Dec	Year
Average precipitation mm (inches)	61.1 (2.41)	37.4 (1.47)	32.0 (1.26)	43.0 (1.69)	48.0 (1.89)	30.9 (1.22)	11.0 (0.43)	16.7 (0.66)	31.4 (1.24)	68.5 (2.70)	67.3 (2.65)	69.2 (2.72)	516.5 (20.34)
Source: APA
