= São Pedro de Alva e São Paio do Mondego =

- Civil parish
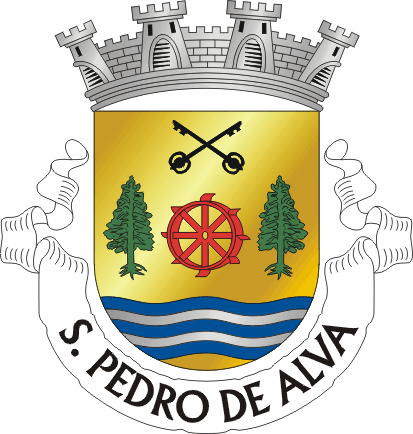
- Coat of arms

- Location in Portugal
- Coordinates: 40.305°N 8.165°W
- Country: Portugal
- Region: Centro
- Intermunic. comm.: Região de Coimbra
- District: Coimbra
- Municipality: Penacova

Area
  - Total: 37.94 km^{2} (14.65 sq mi)

Population (2011)
  - Total: 1,818
  - Density: 47.92/km^{2} (124.1/sq mi)
- Time zone: UTC+00:00 (WET)
  - Summer (DST): UTC+01:00 (WEST)

São Pedro de Alva e São Paio do Mondego is a civil parish in the municipality of Penacova, Portugal. It was formed in 2013 by the merger of the former parishes São Pedro de Alva and São Paio do Mondego. The population in 2011 was 1,818, in an area of 37.94 km^{2}.

They were once previously known as São Pedro de Farinha Podre and São Paio de Farinha Podre, prior to changing to their modern designations in the 20th century.
