= Tavares (Chãs, Várzea e Travanca) =

- Civil parish
- Location in Portugal
- Coordinates: 40.62°N 7.61°W
- Country: Portugal
- Region: Centro
- Intermunic. comm.: Viseu Dão Lafões
- District: Viseu
- Municipality: Mangualde

Area
  - Total: 35.02 km^{2} (13.52 sq mi)

Population (2011)
  - Total: 1,468
  - Density: 42/km^{2} (110/sq mi)
- Time zone: UTC+00:00 (WET)
  - Summer (DST): UTC+01:00 (WEST)

Tavares (Chãs, Várzea e Travanca) is a civil parish in the municipality of Mangualde, Portugal. It was formed in 2013 by the merger of the former parishes Chãs de Tavares, Várzea de Tavares and Travanca de Tavares. The population in 2011 was 1,468, in an area of 35.02 km^{2}.
