= Valhelhas =

Civil parish in Guarda, Portugal

- Civil parish
- Location in Portugal
- Coordinates: 40.407°N 7.403°W
- Country: Portugal
- Region: Centro
- Intermunic. comm.: Beiras e Serra da Estrela
- District: Guarda
- Municipality: Guarda

Area
  - Total: 20.18 km^{2} (7.79 sq mi)

Population (2011)
  - Total: 396
  - Density: 19.6/km^{2} (50.8/sq mi)
- Time zone: UTC+00:00 (WET)
  - Summer (DST): UTC+01:00 (WEST)

Valhelhas is a parish (freguesia) in the municipality of Guarda in Portugal. The population in 2011 was 396, in an area of 20.18 km^{2}.

Valhelhas

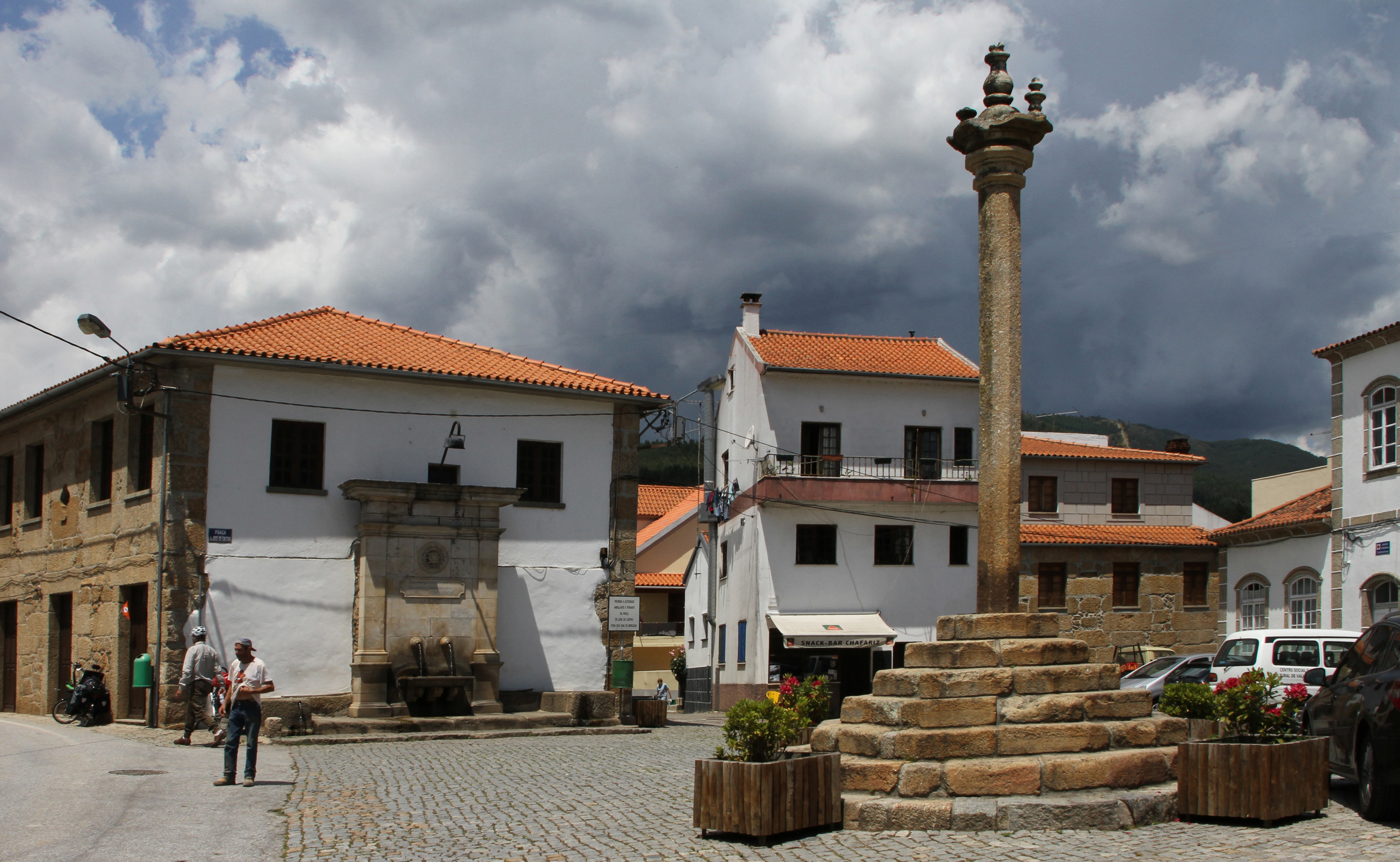

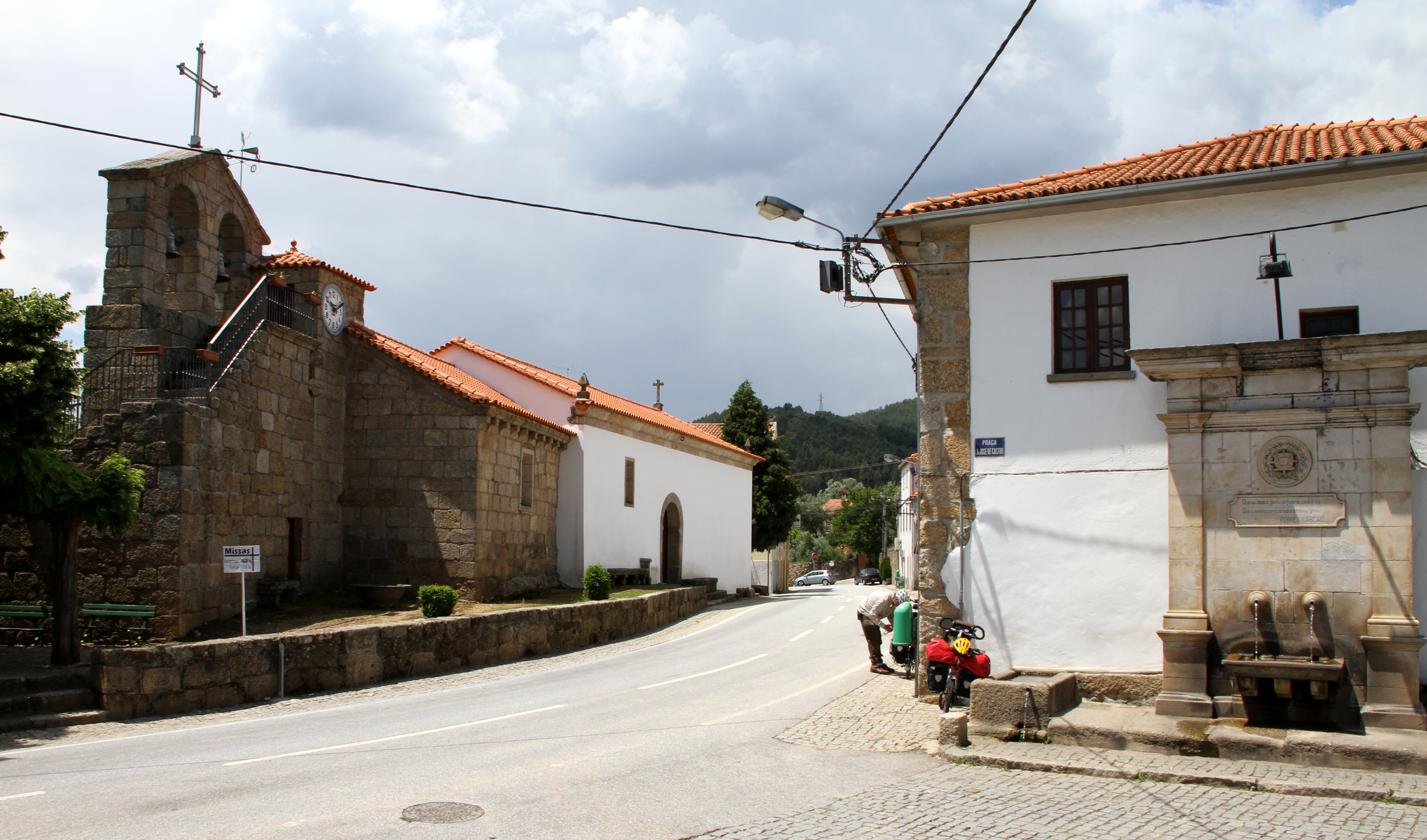

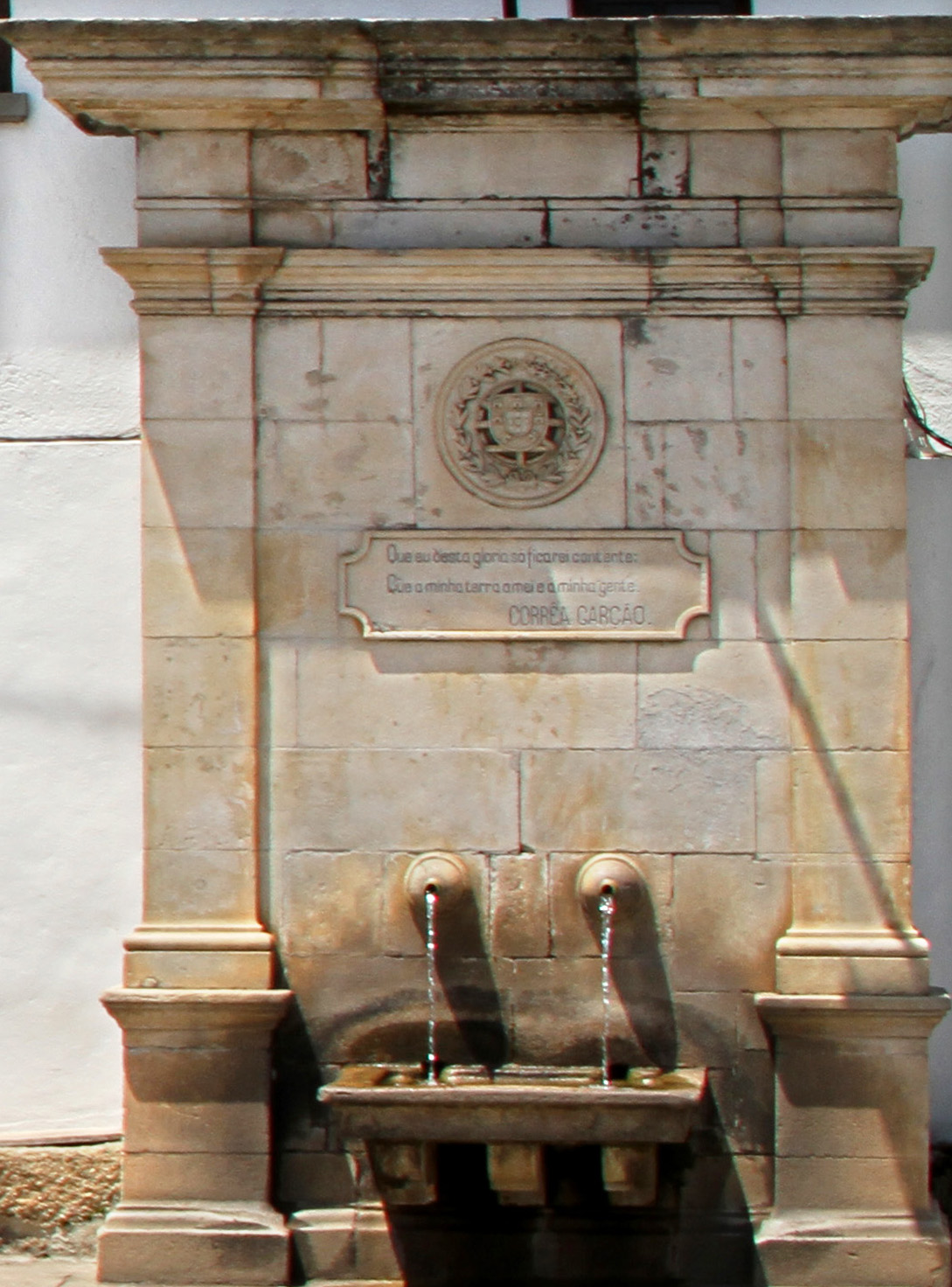

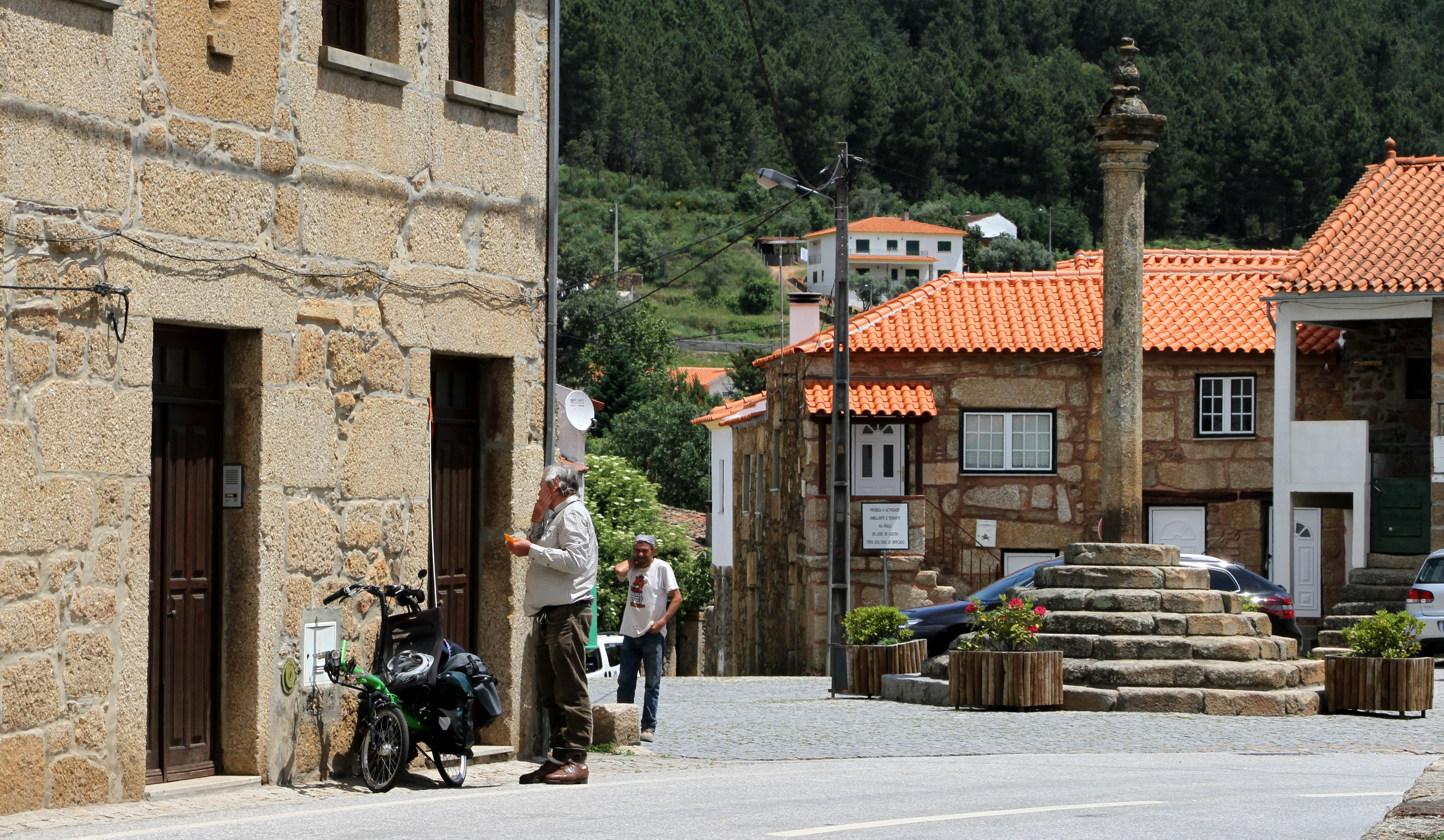

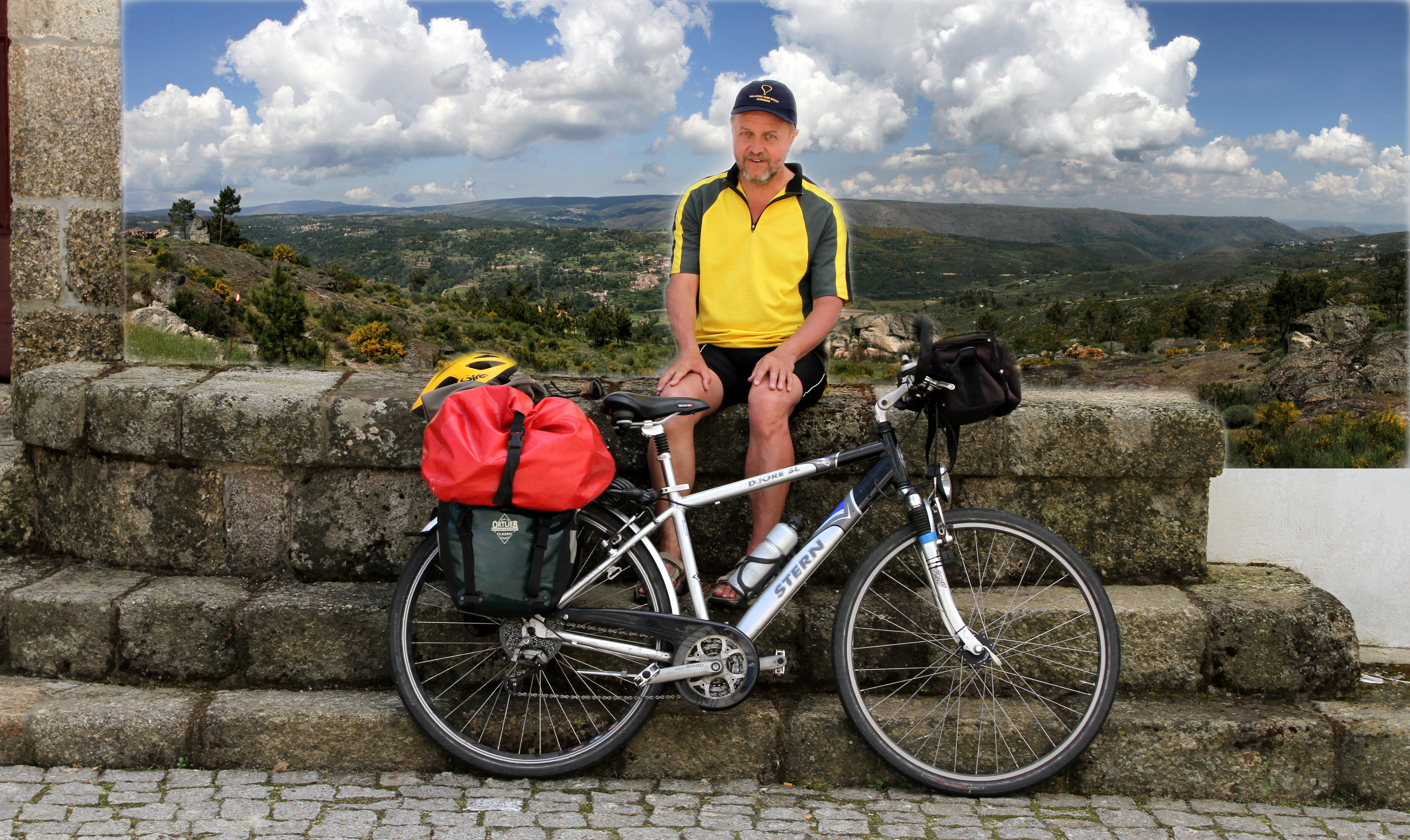
