= Chãs de Tavares =

- Civil parish
- Location in Portugal
- Coordinates: 40°37′18″N 7°36′31″W
- Country: Portugal
- Region: Centro
- Intermunic. comm.: Viseu Dão Lafões
- District: Viseu
- Municipality: Mangualde
- Disbanded: 2013

Area
  - Total: 22.64 km^{2} (8.74 sq mi)

Population (2001)
  - Total: 1,200
  - Density: 53/km^{2} (140/sq mi)
- Time zone: UTC+00:00 (WET)
  - Summer (DST): UTC+01:00 (WEST)

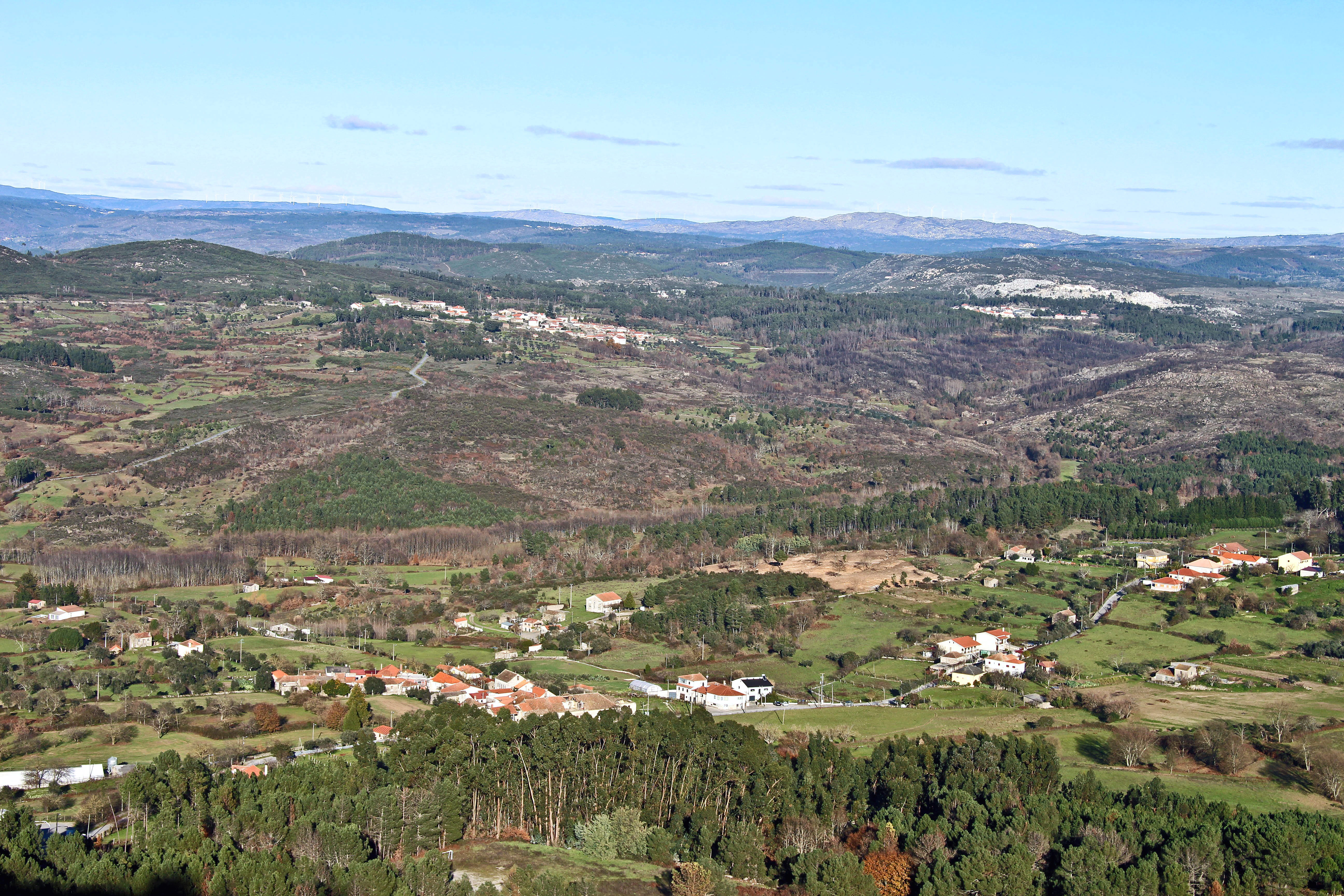

Chãs de Tavares is a former civil parish in the municipality of Mangualde, Portugal. In 2013, the parish merged into the new parish Tavares (Chãs, Várzea e Travanca). It is located 36 kilometres along the A25 road east of Viseu.
