= List of freguesias of Portugal: S =

The freguesias (civil parishes) of Portugal are listed in by municipality according to the following format:

- concelho
  - freguesias

== Sabrosa ==
- Celeirós
- Covas do Douro
- Gouvães do Douro
- Gouvinhas
- Paços
- Parada de Pinhão
- Paradela de Guiães
- Provesende
- Sabrosa
- São Cristóvão do Douro
- São Lourenço de Ribapinhão
- São Martinho de Antas
- Souto Maior
- Torre do Pinhão
- Vilarinho de São Romão

== Sabugal ==
- Águas Belas
- Aldeia da Ponte
- Aldeia da Ribeira
- Aldeia de Santo António
- Aldeia do Bispo
- Aldeia Velha
- Alfaiates
- Badamalos
- Baraçal
- Bendada
- Bismula
- Casteleiro
- Cerdeira
- Fóios
- Forcalhos
- Lajeosa
- Lomba
- Malcata
- Moita
- Nave
- Pena Lobo
- Pousafoles do Bispo
- Quadrazais
- Quinta de São Bartolomeu
- Rapoula do Côa
- Rebolosa
- Rendo
- Ruivós
- Ruvina
- Sabugal
- Santo Estêvão
- Seixo do Côa
- Sortelha
- Souto
- Vale das Éguas
- Vale de Espinho
- Vale Longo
- Vila Boa
- Vila do Touro
- Vilar Maior

== Salvaterra de Magos ==
- Foros de Salvaterra
- Glória do Ribatejo
- Granho
- Marinhais
- Muge
- Salvaterra de Magos

== Santa Comba Dão ==
- Couto do Mosteiro
- Nagozela
- Ovoa
- Pinheiro de Ázere
- Santa Comba Dão
- São Joaninho
- São João de Areias
- Treixedo
- Vimieiro

== Santa Cruz (Madeira) ==
- Camacha
- Caniço
- Gaula
- Santa Cruz
- Santo António da Serra

== Santa Cruz da Graciosa (Azores) ==
- Guadalupe
- Luz
- Praia
- Santa Cruz da Graciosa

== Santa Cruz das Flores (Azores) ==
- Caveira
- Cedros
- Ponta Delgada
- Santa Cruz das Flores

== Santa Maria da Feira ==
- Argoncilhe
- Arrifana
- Caldas de São Jorge
- Canedo
- Escapães
- Espargo
- Feira
- Fiães
- Fornos
- Gião
- Guisande
- Lobão
- Louredo
- Lourosa
- Milheirós de Poiares
- Mosteiró
- Mozelos
- Nogueira da Regedoura
- Paços de Brandão
- Pigeiros
- Rio Meão
- Romariz
- Sanfins
- Sanguedo
- Santa Maria de Lamas
- São João de Vêr
- São Paio de Oleiros
- Souto
- Travanca
- Vale
- Vila Maior

== Santa Marta de Penaguião ==
- Alvações do Corgo
- Cumeeira
- Fontes
- Fornelos
- Lobrigos (São João Baptista)
- Lobrigos (São Miguel)
- Louredo
- Medrões
- Sanhoane
- Sever

== Santana (Madeira) ==
- Arco de São Jorge
- Faial
- Ilha
- Santana
- São Jorge
- São Roque do Faial

== Santarém ==
- Abitureiras
- Abrã
- Achete
- Alcanede
- Alcanhões
- Almoster
- Amiais de Baixo
- Arneiro das Milhariças
- Azoia de Baixo
- Azoia de Cima
- Casével
- Gançaria
- Moçarria
- Pernes
- Pombalinho
- Póvoa da Isenta
- Póvoa de Santarém
- Romeira
- Santa Iria da Ribeira de Santarém
- Santarém (Marvila)
- Santarém (São Nicolau)
- Santarém (São Salvador)
- São Vicente do Paul
- Tremês
- Vale de Figueira
- Vale de Santarém
- Vaqueiros
- Várzea

== Santiago do Cacém ==
- Abela
- Alvalade
- Cercal
- Ermidas-Sado
- Santa Cruz
- Santiago do Cacém
- Santo André
- São Bartolomeu da Serra
- São Domingos
- São Francisco da Serra
- Vale de Água

== Santo Tirso ==
- Agrela
- Água Longa
- Areias
- Burgães
- Campo (São Martinho)
- Carreira
- Couto (Santa Cristina)
- Couto (São Miguel)
- Guimarei
- Lama
- Lamelas
- Monte Córdova
- Negrelos (São Mamede)
- Negrelos (São Tomé)
- Palmeira
- Rebordões
- Refojos de Riba de Ave
- Reguenga
- Roriz
- Santo Tirso
- São Salvador do Campo
- Sequeiró
- Vila das Aves
- Vilarinho

== São Brás de Alportel ==
- São Brás de Alportel
- São João da Madeira
- São João da Madeira

== São João da Pesqueira ==
- Castanheiro do Sul
- Ervedosa do Douro
- Espinhosa
- Nagozelo do Douro
- Paredes da Beira
- Pereiros
- Riodades
- São João da Pesqueira
- Soutelo do Douro
- Trevões
- Vale de Figueira
- Valongo dos Azeites
- Várzea de Trevões
- Vilarouco

== São Pedro do Sul ==
- Baiões
- Bordonhos
- Candal
- Carvalhais
- Covas do Rio
- Figueiredo de Alva
- Manhouce
- Pindelo dos Milagres
- Pinho
- Santa Cruz da Trapa
- São Cristóvão de Lafões
- São Félix
- São Martinho das Moitas
- São Pedro do Sul
- Serrazes
- Sul
- Valadares
- Várzea
- Vila Maior

== São Roque do Pico (Azores) ==
- Prainha
- Santa Luzia
- Santo Amaro
- Santo António
- São Roque

== São Vicente (Madeira) ==
- Boa Ventura
- Ponta Delgada
- São Vicente

== Sardoal ==
- Alcaravela
- Santiago de Montalegre
- Sardoal
- Valhascos

== Sátão ==
- Águas Boas
- Avelal
- Decermilo
- Ferreira de Aves
- Forles
- Mioma
- Rio de Moinhos
- Romãs
- São Miguel de Vila Boa
- Sátão
- Silvã de Cima
- Vila Longa

== Seia ==
- Alvoco da Serra
- Cabeça
- Carragozela
- Folhadosa
- Girabolhos
- Lajes
- Lapa dos Dinheiros
- Loriga
- Paranhos
- Pinhanços
- Sabugueiro
- Sameice
- Sandomil
- Santa Comba
- Santa Eulália
- Santa Marinha
- Santiago
- São Martinho
- São Romão
- Sazes da Beira
- Seia
- Teixeira
- Torrozelo
- Tourais
- Travancinha
- Valezim
- Várzea de Meruge
- Vide
- Vila Cova à Coelheira

== Seixal ==
- Aldeia de Paio Pires
- Amora
- Arrentela
- Corroios
- Fernão Ferro
- Seixal

== Sernancelhe ==
- Arnas
- Carregal
- Chosendo
- Cunha
- Escurquela
- Faia
- Ferreirim
- Fonte Arcada
- Freixinho
- Granjal
- Lamosa
- Macieira
- Penso
- Quintela
- Sarzeda
- Sernancelhe
- Vila da Ponte

== Serpa ==
- Aldeia Nova de São Bento
- Brinches
- Pias
- Serpa (Salvador)
- Serpa (Santa Maria)
- Vale de Vargo
- Vila Verde de Ficalho

== Sertã ==
- Cabeçudo
- Carvalhal
- Castelo
- Cernache do Bonjardim
- Cumeada
- Ermida
- Figueiredo
- Marmeleiro
- Nesperal
- Palhais
- Pedrógão Pequeno
- Sertã
- Troviscal
- Várzea dos Cavaleiros

== Sesimbra ==
- Quinta do Conde
- Sesimbra (Castelo)
- Sesimbra (Santiago)

== Setúbal ==
- Azeitão
- Gâmbia-Pontes-Alto da Guerra
- Sado
- Setúbal

== Sever do Vouga ==
- Cedrim
- Couto de Esteves
- Dornelas
- Paradela
- Pessegueiro do Vouga
- Rocas do Vouga
- Sever do Vouga
- Silva Escura
- Talhadas

== Silves ==
- Alcantarilha
- Algoz
- Armação de Pêra
- Pêra
- São Bartolomeu de Messines
- São Marcos da Serra
- Silves
- Tunes

== Sines ==
- Porto Covo
- Sines

== Sintra ==
- Agualva
- Agualva-Cacém
- Algueirão - Mem Martins
- Almargem do Bispo
- Belas
- Casal de Cambra
- Colares
- Massamá
- Mira-Sintra
- Monte Abraão
- Montelavar
- Pêro Pinheiro
- Queluz
- Rio de Mouro
- São João das Lampas
- São Marcos
- Sintra (Santa Maria e São Miguel)
- Sintra (São Martinho)
- Sintra (São Pedro de Penaferrim)
- Terrugem

== Sobral de Monte Agraço ==
- Santo Quintino
- Sapataria
- Sobral de Monte Agraço

== Soure ==
- Alfarelos
- Brunhós
- Degracias
- Figueiró do Campo
- Gesteira
- Granja do Ulmeiro
- Pombalinho
- Samuel
- Soure
- Tapéus
- Vila Nova de Anços
- Vinha da Rainha

== Sousel ==
- Cano
- Casa Branca
- Santo Amaro
- Sousel
