= Adelaide Penha de Magalhães =

Portuguese activist (1875–1962)

- Born: 19 May 1874; Cabeceiras de Basto, Braga, Portugal
- Died: 12 April 1945 (aged 70); Santo Tirso, Porto, Portugal
- Occupations: Teacher, writer, activist

Adelaide Penha de Magalhães (19 May 1874 – 12 April 1945) was a Portuguese writer, feminist activist, and politician during the First Portuguese Republic era.

== Early life ==
Penha de Magalhães came from a culturally rich background. Her father, José Benjamim de Magalhães, was a musician, and her aunts were teachers, which allowed her to receive a modern education for her time. She studied in Braga, where her relative João Penha lived. Her husband, Manuel Carneiro Ferreira, also held a political position simultaneously with her.

== Career ==
Penha de Magalhães held a political position in the local administration, where she voted in the general assemblies of the Provisional Board. She was one of the first women to hold a political office in Portugal, serving in the Santo Tirso chamber in 1910 during the First Republic. She was succeeded in the second round of voting by Manuel Gil dos Reis Carneiro Dias de Carvalho Ferreira, a former councilor who held various positions in the local administration.

Even before the establishment of the Republic, Penha de Magalhães contributed to republican weekly newspapers, with her earliest known contributions dating back to 1896. She wrote actively for various publications, including O Jornal, O Pacense, and Jornal de Paços de Ferreira. She used her full name for some articles and the pseudonym "A. C. Penha Guimarães" for more impulsive writings to avoid being associated as a woman writer.

== Activism and feminism ==
Together with her husband, Penha de Magalhães promoted the construction of several mixed schools in Santo Tirso starting in 1910. These schools were established in the parishes of Reguenga, Lamelas, and Refojos de Riba de Ave, where she worked as a teacher. The aim of these initiatives was to reduce illiteracy among the general population.
