= Igreja de São Pedro de Roriz =

Church in Roriz, Santo Tirso, Portugal

Coordinates: 41.3444712°N 8.3828239°W

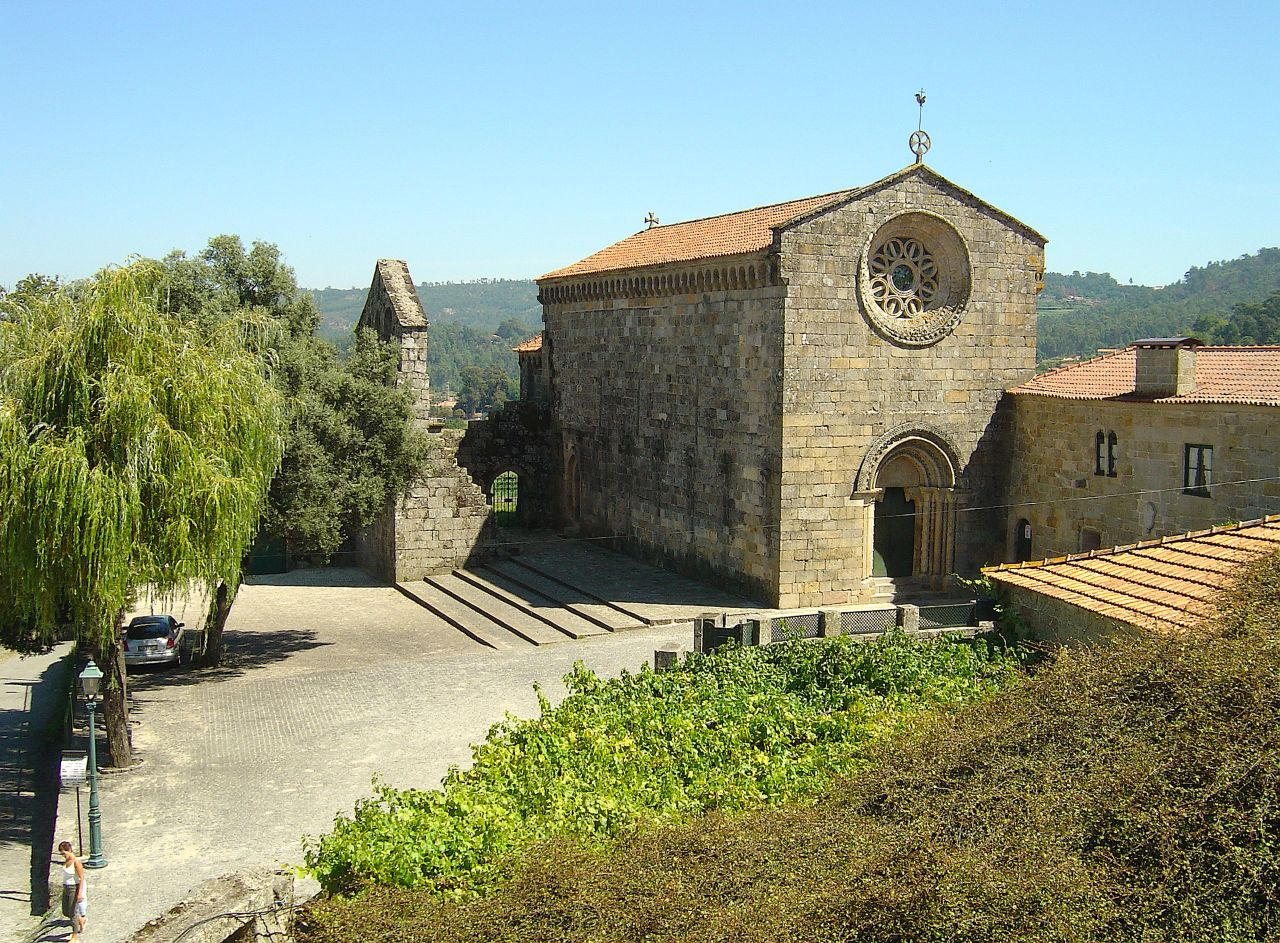
Church of Saint Peter of Roriz

Church of Saint Peter of Roriz (also known as Monastery of Saint Peter of Roriz) is a church in Roriz, Santo Tirso, Portugal. It is classified as a National Monument.

It is a monastic church belonging to the Augustinian order.

== Appearance ==
The church has a rectangular floor plan composed of a nave and a chancel, with the latter adjoining the conventual area. On the left side, there is a 16th-century bell tower. The chancel is vaulted and marked by blind arcades, while the nave features wooden beams and is sparsely illuminated by narrow slits.

The main facade of the church has a gable design, with openings arranged in an axis composed of a pointed arched portal topped by a large rose window. The facades are crowned by cornices supported by corbels and Lombard bands. The interior of the church includes a recent wooden choir loft and a baptistery on the Gospel side. The triumphal arch is semicircular, with double archivolts and a circular window above it. The chancel houses a simple altar table.
