= Negrelos =

Negrelos may refer to:

- Negrelos (São Mamede)
- Negrelos (São Tomé)
