= Tirso =

Tirso is Spanish and Portuguese for Thyrsus, and usually refers to the saint of that name (Saint Thyrsus) (San Tirso, Santo Tirso). It can also refer to:

People

- Tirso Cruz III (born 1952), Filipino actor
- Tirso de Molina (1579-1648), Spanish playwright, poet and friar

Places

- Ula Tirso, commune of Sardinia
- Santo Tirso, city in Portugal
- Santo Tirso parish, municipality in Portugal
- San Tirso de Abres, municipality in Asturias

Geography

- Tirso (river), the most important river of Sardinia

Ships

- MV Tirso, a tugboat
