= Várzea =

Várzea may refer to:

== Places ==
=== Brazil ===
- Várzea, Paraíba
- Várzea, Rio Grande do Norte
- Várzea da Roça, a municipality in Bahia
- Várzea do Poço, a municipality in Bahia
- Várzea Nova a municipality in Bahia
- Várzea Alegre a municipality in Ceará
- Várzea da Palma, a municipality in Minas Gerais
- Várzea Branca, a municipality in Piauí
- Várzea Paulista, a municipality in São Paulo
- Rio da Várzea, a river in the state of Rio Grande do Sul, tributary of the Uruguay River
- Várzea, a neighborhood of Recife, Pernambuco

=== Cape Verde ===
- Várzea, Praia

=== Portugal ===
- Várzea (Amarante), a parish of Portugal
- Várzea (Arouca), a parish of Portugal
- Várzea (Barcelos)
- Várzea (Felgueiras), a parish of Portugal
- Várzea (Santarém), a parish of Portugal
- Várzea (São Pedro do Sul), a parish of Portugal

== Other uses ==
- Varzea (lizard), a genus of lizards
- Várzea forest, a type of seasonally flooded forest growing along rivers in the Amazon
- Estádio da Várzea, a stadium in Praia on the island of Santiago, Cape Verde

== See also ==
- Várzea Grande (disambiguation)
