= Vila Nova do Campo =

- Civil parish
- Location in Portugal
- Coordinates: 41.361°N 8.368°W
- Country: Portugal
- Region: Norte
- Metropolitan area: Porto
- District: Porto
- Municipality: Santo Tirso

Area
  - Total: 9.60 km^{2} (3.71 sq mi)

Population (2011)
  - Total: 6,809
  - Density: 709/km^{2} (1,840/sq mi)
- Time zone: UTC+00:00 (WET)
  - Summer (DST): UTC+01:00 (WEST)

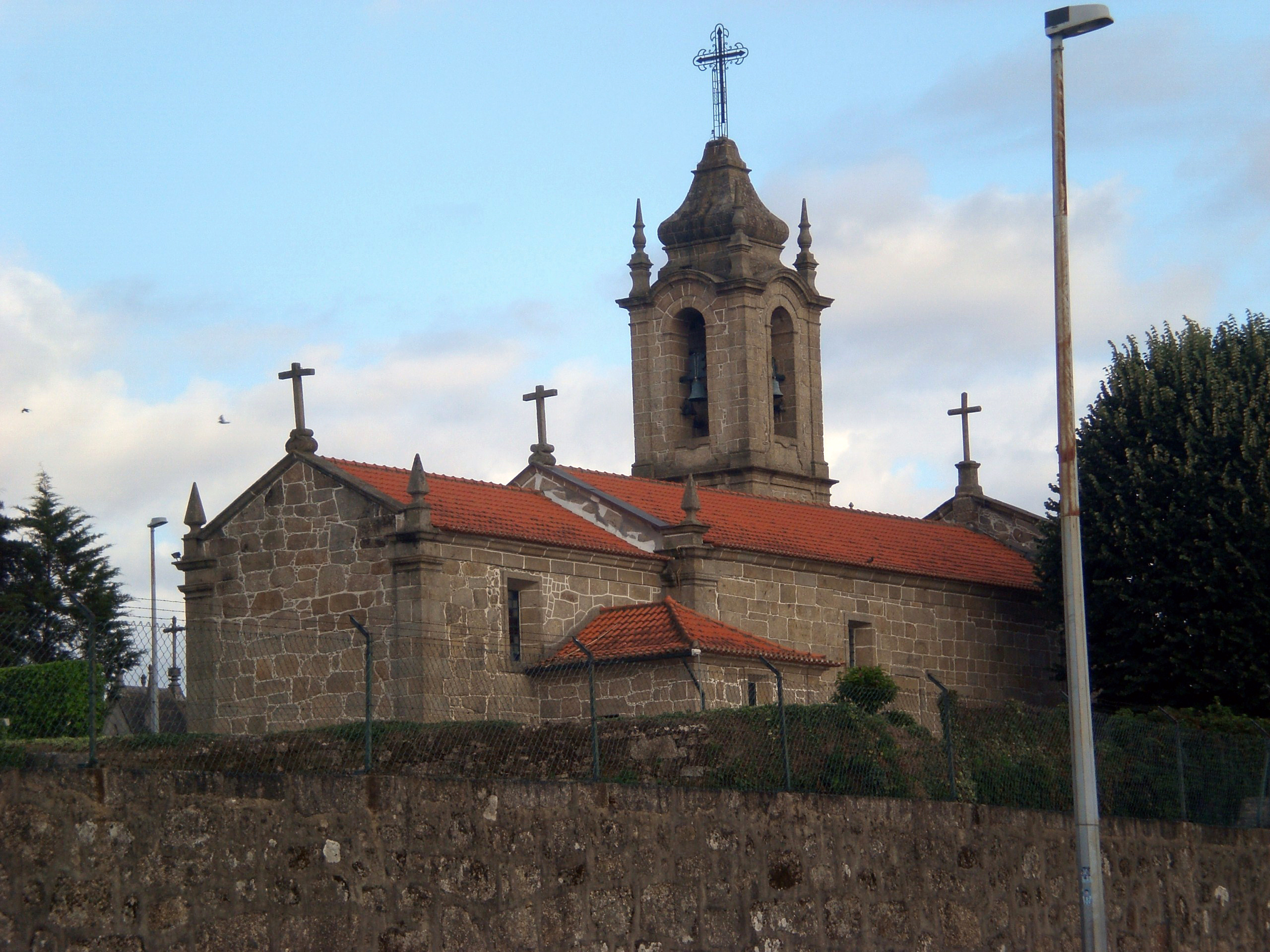

Vila Nova do Campo (formerly known as Campo (São Martinho), São Salvador do Campo e Negrelos (São Mamede)) is a civil parish in the municipality of Santo Tirso, Portugal. It was formed in 2013 by the merger of the former parishes Campo (São Martinho), São Salvador do Campo and Negrelos (São Mamede). In 2015 the name of the parish was changed to Vila Nova do Campo. The population in 2011 was 6,809, in an area of 9.60 km².
