= Areias (Santo Tirso) =

- Civil parish
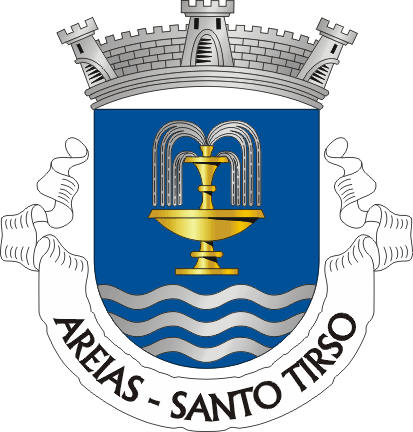
- Coat of arms

- Location in Portugal
- Coordinates: 41°21′47″N 8°28′36″W
- Country: Portugal
- Region: Norte
- Metropolitan area: Porto
- District: Porto
- Municipality: Santo Tirso
- Established: Civil parish: c. 1836
- Disbanded: 2013

Area
  - Total: 2.77 km^{2} (1.07 sq mi)

Population (2001)
  - Total: 2,599
  - Density: 940/km^{2} (2,400/sq mi)
- Time zone: UTC+00:00 (WET)
  - Summer (DST): UTC+01:00 (WEST)
- Postal code: 4780-000
- Area code: 252
- Patron: São Tiago

Areias (Portuguese plural form of sand) is a former civil parish in the municipality of Santo Tirso, Portugal. In 2013, the parish merged into the new parish Areias, Sequeiró, Lama e Palmeira. Located 3 km (1.9 mi) from the urban centre of Santo Tirso, its population numbers approximately 2,599 inhabitants (2001 census), in an area of 2.77 square kilometres (1.07 sq mi); its density is 938/km^{2} (2,430/sq mi).

== History ==
The iconic locality of Senhora da Torre, alongside the Ave, is the home to ancient ruins of castro from the Luso-Roman period of the region's history. It is also the location of a small chapel and lookout, the Miradouro da Senhora da Torre.

Until 1836 the parish was part of the municipality of Landim, until it was de-annexed and absorbed into Santo Tirso.

== Geography ==
Areias is situated on the right margin of the Ave River, in the extreme north of the municipality.

== Architecture ==
The parish is notable for a few national monuments, including:

- Nuno Álvares Institute (Portuguese: Hotel Termal das Caldas da Saúde/Instituto Nuno'Alvres/Instituto Nuno Álvares)
- Thermal heath spa (Portuguese: Termas das Caldas da Saúde)
