= Lamelas e Guimarei =

- Civil parish
- Location in Portugal
- Coordinates: 41.290°N 8.475°W
- Country: Portugal
- Region: Norte
- Metropolitan area: Porto
- District: Porto
- Municipality: Santo Tirso

Area
  - Total: 12.41 km^{2} (4.79 sq mi)

Population (2011)
  - Total: 1,660
  - Density: 130/km^{2} (350/sq mi)
- Time zone: UTC+00:00 (WET)
  - Summer (DST): UTC+01:00 (WEST)

Lamelas e Guimarei is a civil parish in the municipality of Santo Tirso, Portugal. It was formed in 2013 by the merger of the former parishes Lamelas and Guimarei. The population in 2011 was 1,660, in an area of 12.41 km^{2}.
