= Filipe Ferreira =

Filipe Ferreira may refer to:

- Filipe Ferreira (footballer, born 1990), Portuguese football defender
- Filipe Ferreira (footballer, born October 1996), Portuguese football midfielder
- Filipe Ferreira (footballer, born September 1996), Portuguese football goalkeeper
