= Santo Tirso (parish) =

- Civil parish
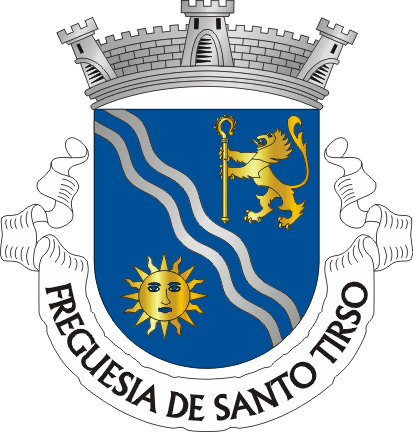
- Coat of arms

- Location in Portugal
- Coordinates: 41°20′32″N 8°28′37″W
- Country: Portugal
- Region: Norte
- Metropolitan area: Porto
- District: Porto
- Municipality: Santo Tirso
- Disbanded: 2013

Area
  - Total: 8.00 km^{2} (3.09 sq mi)

Population (2001)
  - Total: 13,961
  - Density: 1,700/km^{2} (4,500/sq mi)
- Time zone: UTC+00:00 (WET)
  - Summer (DST): UTC+01:00 (WEST)

Santo Tirso parish is a former civil parish in the municipality of Santo Tirso, Portugal. In 2013, the parish merged into the new parish Santo Tirso, Couto (Santa Cristina e São Miguel) e Burgães. It was the most populous parish in the city of Santo Tirso. It is an international textile center.
