= Caldas de São Jorge e Pigeiros =

Civil parish in Portugal

- Civil parish
- Location in Portugal
- Coordinates: 40.969°N 8.500°W
- Country: Portugal
- Region: Norte
- Metropolitan area: Porto
- District: Aveiro
- Municipality: Santa Maria da Feira

Area
  - Total: 10.64 km^{2} (4.11 sq mi)

Population (2011)
  - Total: 3,897
  - Density: 370/km^{2} (950/sq mi)
- Time zone: UTC+00:00 (WET)
  - Summer (DST): UTC+01:00 (WEST)

Caldas de São Jorge e Pigeiros is a civil parish in the municipality of Santa Maria da Feira, Portugal. It was formed in 2013 by the merger of the former parishes Caldas de São Jorge and Pigeiros. The population in 2011 was 3,897, in an area of 10.64 km^{2}.
