= Guimarei =

- Civil parish
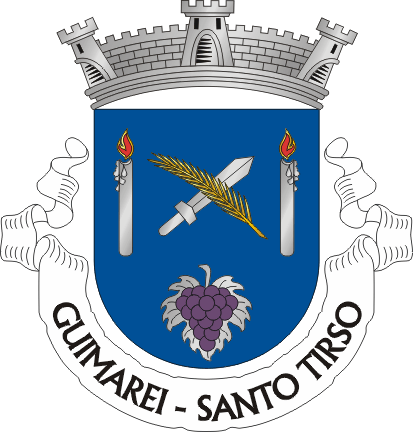
- Coat of arms

- Location in Portugal
- Coordinates: 41°18′10″N 8°29′13″W
- Country: Portugal
- Region: Norte
- Metropolitan area: Porto
- District: Porto
- Municipality: Santo Tirso
- Disbanded: 2013

Area
  - Total: 6.43 km^{2} (2.48 sq mi)

Population (2001)
  - Total: 736
  - Density: 110/km^{2} (300/sq mi)
- Time zone: UTC+00:00 (WET)
  - Summer (DST): UTC+01:00 (WEST)

Guimarei is a former civil parish in the municipality of Santo Tirso, Portugal. In 2013, the parish merged into the new parish Lamelas e Guimarei. It has a population of 736 (2001 census), and an area of 6.43 km^{2}. It is located 3 km south of the center of the city of Santo Tirso in the Leça Valley.

It is a residential place with some people working in agriculture.
