= Campo (São Martinho) =

São Martinho do Campo
- Civil parish
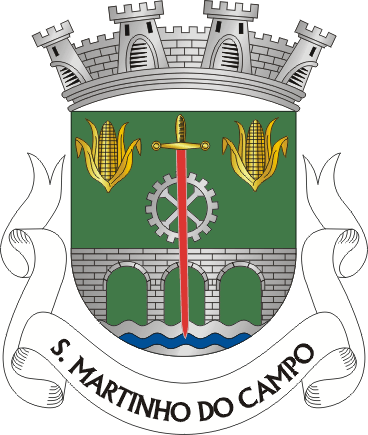
- Coat of arms

- Location in Portugal
- Coordinates: 41°21′39″N 8°22′4″W
- Country: Portugal
- Region: Norte
- Metropolitan area: Porto
- District: Porto
- Municipality: Santo Tirso
- Disbanded: 2013

Area
  - Total: 3.44 km^{2} (1.33 sq mi)

Population (2001)
  - Total: 3,736
  - Density: 1,100/km^{2} (2,800/sq mi)
- Time zone: UTC+00:00 (WET)
  - Summer (DST): UTC+01:00 (WEST)

São Martinho do Campo is a former civil parish in the municipality of Santo Tirso, Portugal. In 2013, the parish merged into the new parish Campo (São Martinho), São Salvador do Campo e Negrelos (São Mamede). It is located 10 km northeast of the city of Santo Tirso, it's an important textile industry center.
