= Lobão, Gião, Louredo e Guisande =

Civil parish in Portugal

- Civil parish
- Location in Portugal
- Coordinates: 40.987°N 8.484°W
- Country: Portugal
- Region: Norte
- Metropolitan area: Porto
- District: Aveiro
- Municipality: Santa Maria da Feira

Area
  - Total: 23.58 km^{2} (9.10 sq mi)

Population (2011)
  - Total: 9,860
  - Density: 420/km^{2} (1,100/sq mi)
- Time zone: UTC+00:00 (WET)
  - Summer (DST): UTC+01:00 (WEST)

Lobão, Gião, Louredo e Guisande is a civil parish in the municipality of Santa Maria da Feira, Portugal. It was formed in 2013 by the merger of the former parishes Lobão, Gião, Louredo and Guisande. The population in 2011 was 9,860, in an area of 23.58 km^{2}.

The toponym of the name is a personal name, it was named in 906 with Lupon and in 967 as Lubon. It is derived from Lupu and with a suffix -one It exists on a document in the year 1055 which mentioned a settlement as Lopone.
