= Burgães =

- Civil parish
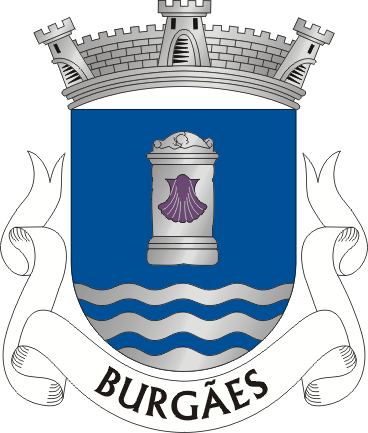
- Coat of arms

- Location in Portugal
- Coordinates: 41°20′59″N 8°27′12″W
- Country: Portugal
- Region: Norte
- Metropolitan area: Porto
- District: Porto
- Municipality: Santo Tirso
- Disbanded: 2013

Area
  - Total: 5.06 km^{2} (1.95 sq mi)

Population (2001)
  - Total: 2,244
  - Density: 440/km^{2} (1,100/sq mi)
- Time zone: UTC+00:00 (WET)
  - Summer (DST): UTC+01:00 (WEST)

Burgães is a former civil parish in the municipality of Santo Tirso, Portugal. In 2013, the parish merged into the new parish of Santo Tirso, Couto (Santa Cristina e São Miguel) e Burgães. It is located in the northeast of the city of Santo Tirso. As of the 2001 census, the population was 2,244 and the area was 5.06 km².

The parish has several industrial facilities.
