= Reguengo =

Reguengo, the name attributed to villages who were royal property in Portugal, may refer to several parishes:

- Reguenga, a parish in the municipality of Santo Tirso
- Reguengo, a parish in the municipality of Portalegre
- Reguengo do Fetal, a parish in the municipality of Batalha
- Reguengo Grande, a parish in the municipality of Lourinhã
- Reguengos de Monsaraz Municipality, a municipality in the district of Évora
- Reguengos de Monsaraz (parish), a parish in the municipality of Reguengos de Monsaraz
