= Guisande =

Guisande may refer to the following places in Portugal:

- Guisande (Braga), a parish in the municipality of Braga
- Guisande (Santa Maria da Feira), a parish in the municipality of Santa Maria da Feira
