= Couto (São Miguel) =

São Miguel do Couto
- Civil parish
- Location in Portugal
- Coordinates: 41°19′53″N 8°27′46″W
- Country: Portugal
- Region: Norte
- Metropolitan area: Porto
- District: Porto
- Municipality: Santo Tirso
- Disbanded: 2013

Area
  - Total: 2.39 km^{2} (0.92 sq mi)

Population (2001)
  - Total: 1,292
  - Density: 540/km^{2} (1,400/sq mi)
- Time zone: UTC+00:00 (WET)
  - Summer (DST): UTC+01:00 (WEST)

São Miguel do Couto is a former civil parish in the municipality of Santo Tirso, Portugal. In 2013, the parish merged into the new parish Santo Tirso, Couto (Santa Cristina e São Miguel) e Burgães. It is located southeast in the city of Santo Tirso, near the bottom of Monte Cordova Hill.

At the 2001 census, it had a population of 1,292. It covers 2.39 km^{2} of area, most of which is residential although there are some textile industry facilities here, too.

In 907, Count Hermenegildo González, governor of the Condado Portucalense, was born here.
