= São Salvador do Campo =

- Civil parish
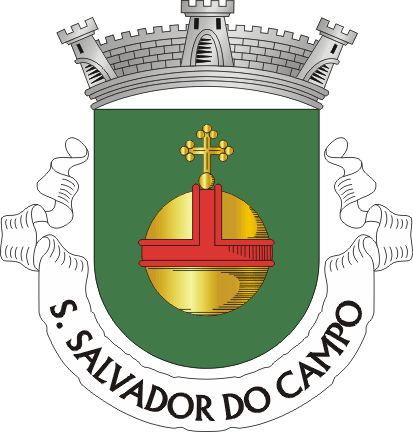
- Coat of arms

- Location in Portugal
- Coordinates: 41°21′48″N 8°21′33″W
- Country: Portugal
- Region: Norte
- Metropolitan area: Porto
- District: Porto
- Municipality: Santo Tirso
- Disbanded: 2013

Area
  - Total: 1.56 km^{2} (0.60 sq mi)

Population (2001)
  - Total: 1,134
  - Density: 730/km^{2} (1,900/sq mi)
- Time zone: UTC+00:00 (WET)
  - Summer (DST): UTC+01:00 (WEST)

São Salvador do Campo is a former civil parish in the municipality of Santo Tirso, Portugal. In 2013, the parish merged into the new parish Campo (São Martinho), São Salvador do Campo e Negrelos (São Mamede). It is located 10 km northeast of the city of Santo Tirso.
