= Ricardo Carvalho (disambiguation) =

Ricardo Carvalho (born 1978) is a Portuguese former footballer.

Ricardo Carvalho may also refer to:

- Ricardo Carvalho (writer) (1910–1990), Spanish writer
- Ricardo de Carvalho (born 1967), Brazilian rower
- Ricardo Carvalho (footballer, born 1996), Portuguese footballer who plays as a defender
