= Gião =

Gião may refer to the following places in Portugal:

- Gião (Santa Maria da Feira), a parish in the municipality of Santa Maria da Feira
- Gião (Vila do Conde), a parish in the municipality of Vila do Conde
