= Sequeiró =

- Civil parish
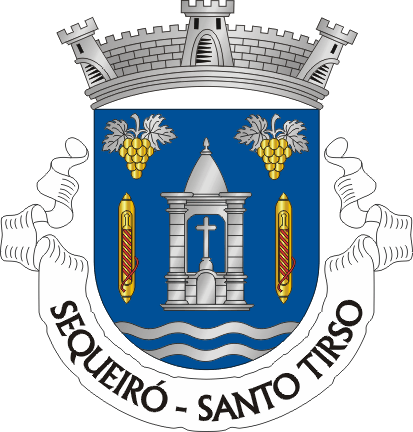
- Coat of arms

- Location in Portugal
- Coordinates: 41°22′1″N 8°27′21″W
- Country: Portugal
- Region: Norte
- Metropolitan area: Porto
- District: Porto
- Municipality: Santo Tirso
- Disbanded: 2013

Area
  - Total: 2.15 km^{2} (0.83 sq mi)

Population (2001)
  - Total: 1,769
  - Density: 820/km^{2} (2,100/sq mi)
- Time zone: UTC+00:00 (WET)
  - Summer (DST): UTC+01:00 (WEST)

Sequeirô is a former civil parish in the municipality of Santo Tirso, Portugal. In 2013, the parish merged into the new parish Areias, Sequeiró, Lama e Palmeira. It is located 3 km north of the city of Santo Tirso.
