= Agrela =

Agrela may refer to two parishes in Portugal:

- Agrela (Fafe), a parish in the municipality of Fafe
- Agrela (Santo Tirso), a parish in the municipality of Santo Tirso
