= Carreira e Refojos de Riba de Ave =

- Civil parish
- Location in Portugal
- Coordinates: 41.301°N 8.471°W
- Country: Portugal
- Region: Norte
- Metropolitan area: Porto
- District: Porto
- Municipality: Santo Tirso

Area
  - Total: 9.49 km^{2} (3.66 sq mi)

Population (2011)
  - Total: 2,072
  - Density: 218/km^{2} (565/sq mi)
- Time zone: UTC+00:00 (WET)
  - Summer (DST): UTC+01:00 (WEST)

Carreira e Refojos de Riba de Ave is a civil parish in the municipality of Santo Tirso, Portugal. It was formed in 2013 by the merger of the former parishes Carreira and Refojos de Riba de Ave. The population in 2011 was 2,072, in an area of 9.49 km².
