= Louredo =

Louredo may refer to the following places in Portugal:

- Louredo (Amarante), a civil parish in the municipality of Amarante
- Louredo (Paredes), a civil parish in the municipality of Paredes
- Louredo (Póvoa de Lanhoso), a civil parish in the municipality of Póvoa de Lanhoso
- Louredo (Santa Maria da Feira), a civil parish in the municipality of Santa Maria da Feira
- Louredo (Santa Marta de Penaguião), a civil parish in the municipality of Santa Marta de Penaguião
- Louredo (Vieira do Minho), a civil parish in the municipality of Vieira do Minho
