= Carreira (Santo Tirso) =

Former civil parish in the municipality of Santo Tirso, Portugal

São Tiago da Carreira
- Civil parish
- Location in Portugal
- Coordinates: 41°18′5″N 8°28′16″W
- Country: Portugal
- Region: Norte
- Metropolitan area: Porto
- District: Porto
- Municipality: Santo Tirso
- Disbanded: 2013

Area
  - Total: 3.45 km^{2} (1.33 sq mi)

Population (2001)
  - Total: 982
  - Density: 280/km^{2} (740/sq mi)
- Time zone: UTC+00:00 (WET)
  - Summer (DST): UTC+01:00 (WEST)

Carreira is a former civil parish in the municipality of Santo Tirso, Portugal. In 2013, the parish merged into the new parish Carreira e Refojos de Riba de Ave. It is located 4 kilometres (2.5 mi) to the south of the city of Santo Tirso in the Leça Valley of Portugal. It has a population of 982 (2001 census) and an area of 3.45 square kilometres (1.33 sq mi). It is mostly residential, with some inhabitants working in agriculture.

== Sport ==
- A.D.R. Santiaguense.
