= Palmeira =

Palmeira may refer to:

== Places ==
=== Cape Verde ===
- Palmeira, Cape Verde, a village on the island of Sal

=== Brazil ===
- Palmeira, Paraná, a municipality in the State of Paraná
- Palmeira das Missões, a municipality in the State of Rio Grande do Sul
- Palmeira, Santa Catarina, a municipality in the State of Santa Catarina
- Palmeira d'Oeste, a municipality in the State of São Paulo

=== Mozambique ===
- Palmeira, Mozambique, a locality in the Manhiça District

=== Portugal ===
- Palmeira (Braga), a civil parish in the municipality of Braga
- Palmeira (Santo Tirso), a civil parish in the municipality of Santo Tirso

=== Spain ===
- Palmeira, a parish in the municipality of Ribeira, Galicia

== Other meanings ==
- Palmeira Futebol Clube da Una, a Brazilian football (soccer) club
