= Couto (Santa Cristina) =

- Civil parish
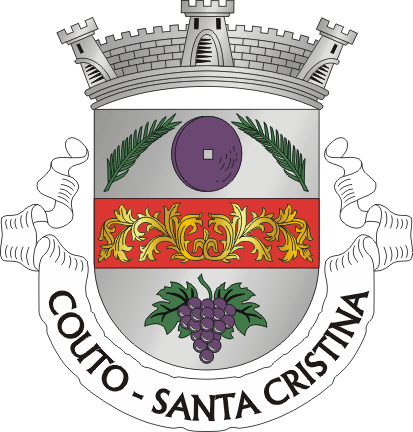
- Coat of arms

- Location in Portugal
- Coordinates: 41°19′28″N 8°28′31″W
- Country: Portugal
- Region: Norte
- Metropolitan area: Porto
- District: Porto
- Municipality: Santo Tirso
- Disbanded: 2013

Area
  - Total: 7.80 km^{2} (3.01 sq mi)

Population (2001)
  - Total: 3,982
  - Density: 510/km^{2} (1,300/sq mi)
- Time zone: UTC+00:00 (WET)
  - Summer (DST): UTC+01:00 (WEST)

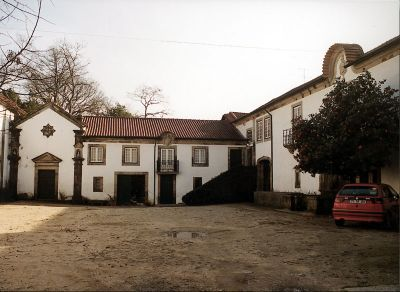
Couto (Santa Cristina): Dinis house sec. XVII

Couto Santa Cristina is a former civil parish in the municipality of Santo Tirso, Portugal. In 2013, the parish merged into the new parish Santo Tirso, Couto (Santa Cristina e São Miguel) e Burgães. It is located south in the city of Santo Tirso. At the 2001 census, its population was 3,982. It covers 7.8 km^{2} of area.

The area is also home to several industrial commercial facilities.

Amigiscm (Associação Amigos de Santa Cristina) is based there.
