= Santo Tirso, Couto (Santa Cristina e São Miguel) e Burgães =

- Civil parish
- Location in Portugal
- Coordinates: 41.363°N 8.477°W
- Country: Portugal
- Region: Norte
- Metropolitan area: Porto
- District: Porto
- Municipality: Santo Tirso

Area
  - Total: 25.22 km^{2} (9.74 sq mi)

Population (2011)
  - Total: 21,538
  - Density: 854.0/km^{2} (2,212/sq mi)
- Time zone: UTC+00:00 (WET)
  - Summer (DST): UTC+01:00 (WEST)

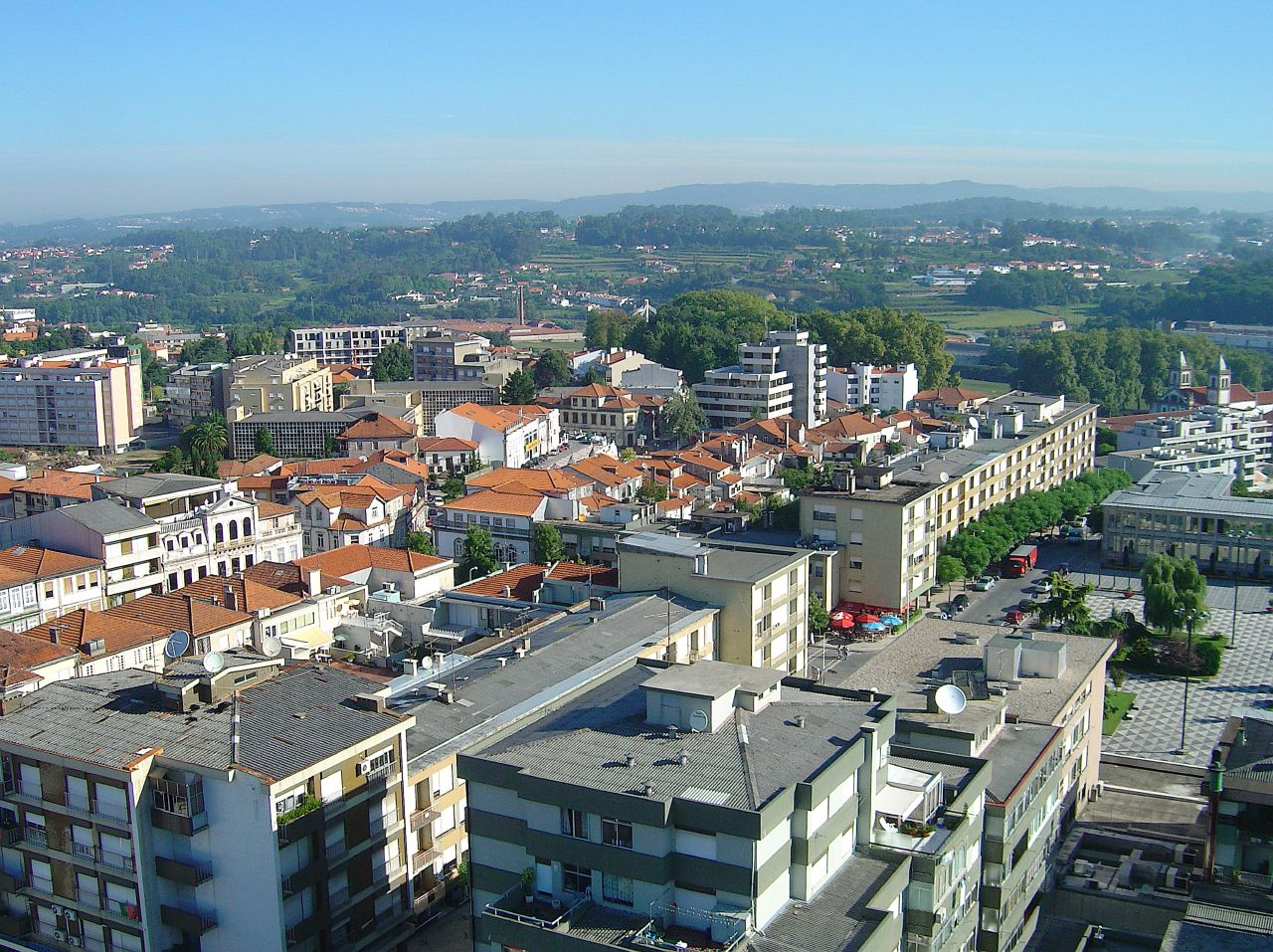
Santo Tirso

Santo Tirso, Couto (Santa Cristina e São Miguel) e Burgães is a civil parish in the municipality of Santo Tirso, Portugal. It was formed in 2013 by the merger of the former parishes Santo Tirso, Couto (Santa Cristina), Couto (São Miguel) and Burgães. The population in 2011 was 21,538, in an area of 25.22 km^{2}.
