= Rebordões =

- Civil parish
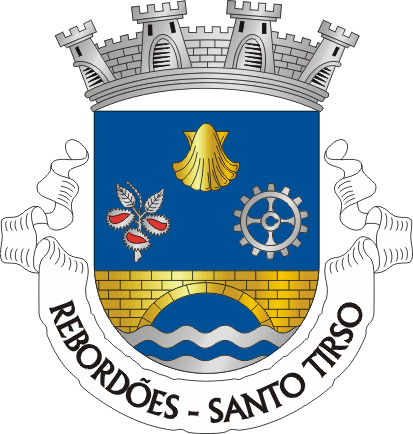
- Coat of arms

- Location in Portugal
- Coordinates: 41.355°N 8.428°W
- Country: Portugal
- Region: Norte
- Metropolitan area: Porto
- District: Porto
- Municipality: Santo Tirso

Area
  - Total: 4.21 km^{2} (1.63 sq mi)
- Elevation: 138 m (453 ft)

Population (2011)
  - Total: 3,368
  - Density: 800/km^{2} (2,100/sq mi)
- Time zone: UTC+00:00 (WET)
  - Summer (DST): UTC+01:00 (WEST)
- Postal code: 4795
- Area code: 252
- Patron: São Tiago
- Website: http://www.jf-rebordoes.pt/

Rebordões is a civil parish in the Santo Tirso Municipality located three kilometres northeast of the municipal seat of Santo Tirso. The population in 2011 was 3,368, in an area of 4.21 km².

== History ==
There are many theories about the parish's origin and its toponymic name, but most accept that the settlement was formed in the Middle Ages by a group of peasants from Santo Tirso. Arriving in an area full of wild chestnuts (the rebordão), the area began to be referred to as Rebordões.

Although not a citizen of the community, the celebrated painter Francisco José Resende (1825–1893) was known to have lived in the area of Santosinhos. Professor at the Academy of Arts in Porto (Portuguese: Academia de Belas Artes do Porto), he filled much of his artwork with scenes of the local community.

== Notable citizens ==
- Joaquim Ferreira da Silva (born 1916), lieutenant and military chaplain, born to a long line of religious families that included one bishop, four priests and four nuns, he received a military service medal, for his service in Portuguese India;
- Armindo Araújo (born 1 September 1977) is a rally driver, responsible for winning the Production World Rally Championship two successive years (2009–2010), becoming the first pilot to receive this honour since its creation in 2002.
