= Pigeiros =

Former civil parish in Portugal

- Civil parish
- Location in Portugal
- Coordinates: 40.951°N 8.484°W
- Country: Portugal
- Region: Norte
- Metropolitan area: Porto
- District: Aveiro
- Municipality: Santa Maria da Feira
- Disbanded: 2013

Area
  - Total: 5.13 km^{2} (1.98 sq mi)

Population (2001)
  - Total: 1,369
  - Density: 270/km^{2} (690/sq mi)
- Time zone: UTC+00:00 (WET)
  - Summer (DST): UTC+01:00 (WEST)

Pigeiros is a former civil parish in the municipality of Santa Maria da Feira, Portugal. In 2013, the parish merged into the new parish Caldas de São Jorge e Pigeiros. It has a population of 1,369 inhabitants and a total area of 5.13 km^{2}.
