= José Vilaça =

Portuguese footballer

Personal information
- Full name: José António Martins Vilaça
- Date of birth: 26 March 1985 (age 41)
- Place of birth: Santo Tirso, Portugal
- Height: 1.90 m (6 ft 3 in)
- Position: Centre-back

Team information
- Current team: Aliados Lordelo

Youth career
- 1999–2003: Tirsense

Senior career*
Years	Team	Apps	(Gls)
2003–2013	Tirsense		
2013–2017	Famalicão	113	(11)
2017	Merelinense	1	(0)
2018	Aliança Gandra	8	(1)
2018–2019	Tirsense	44	(6)
2019–2020	Salgueiros	23	(0)
2020–2022	Rebordosa		
2022–	Aliados Lordelo		
- * Club domestic league appearances and goals as of 1 August 2020

José António Martins Vilaça (born 26 March 1985) is a Portuguese football player who plays as a centre-back for Aliados Lordelo.

== Career ==
Vilaça made his professional debut in the Segunda Liga for Famalicão on 9 August 2015 in a game against Varzim.
