= Monte Córdova =

- Civil parish
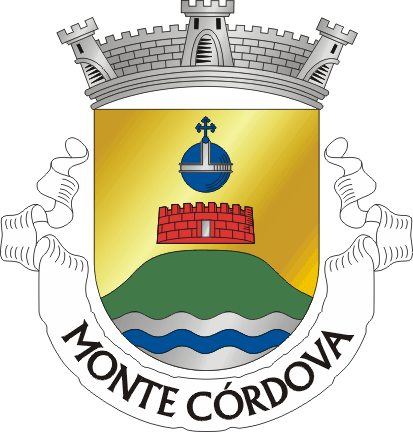
- Coat of arms

- Location in Portugal
- Coordinates: 41.317°N 8.440°W
- Country: Portugal
- Region: Norte
- Metropolitan area: Porto
- District: Porto
- Municipality: Santo Tirso

Area
  - Total: 16.80 km^{2} (6.49 sq mi)
- Elevation: 383 m (1,257 ft)

Population (2011)
  - Total: 3,958
  - Density: 240/km^{2} (610/sq mi)
- Time zone: UTC+00:00 (WET)
  - Summer (DST): UTC+01:00 (WEST)
- Postal code: 4825
- Area code: 252
- Patron: São Salvador
- Website: https://web.archive.org/web/20071127090441/http://www.jf-montecordova.pt/

Monte Córdova is a civil parish in the Portuguese municipality of Santo Tirso, located 4 kilometres east of the municipal seat. The population in 2011 was 3,958, in an area of 16.80 km^{2} (6.49 sq mi).

== History ==
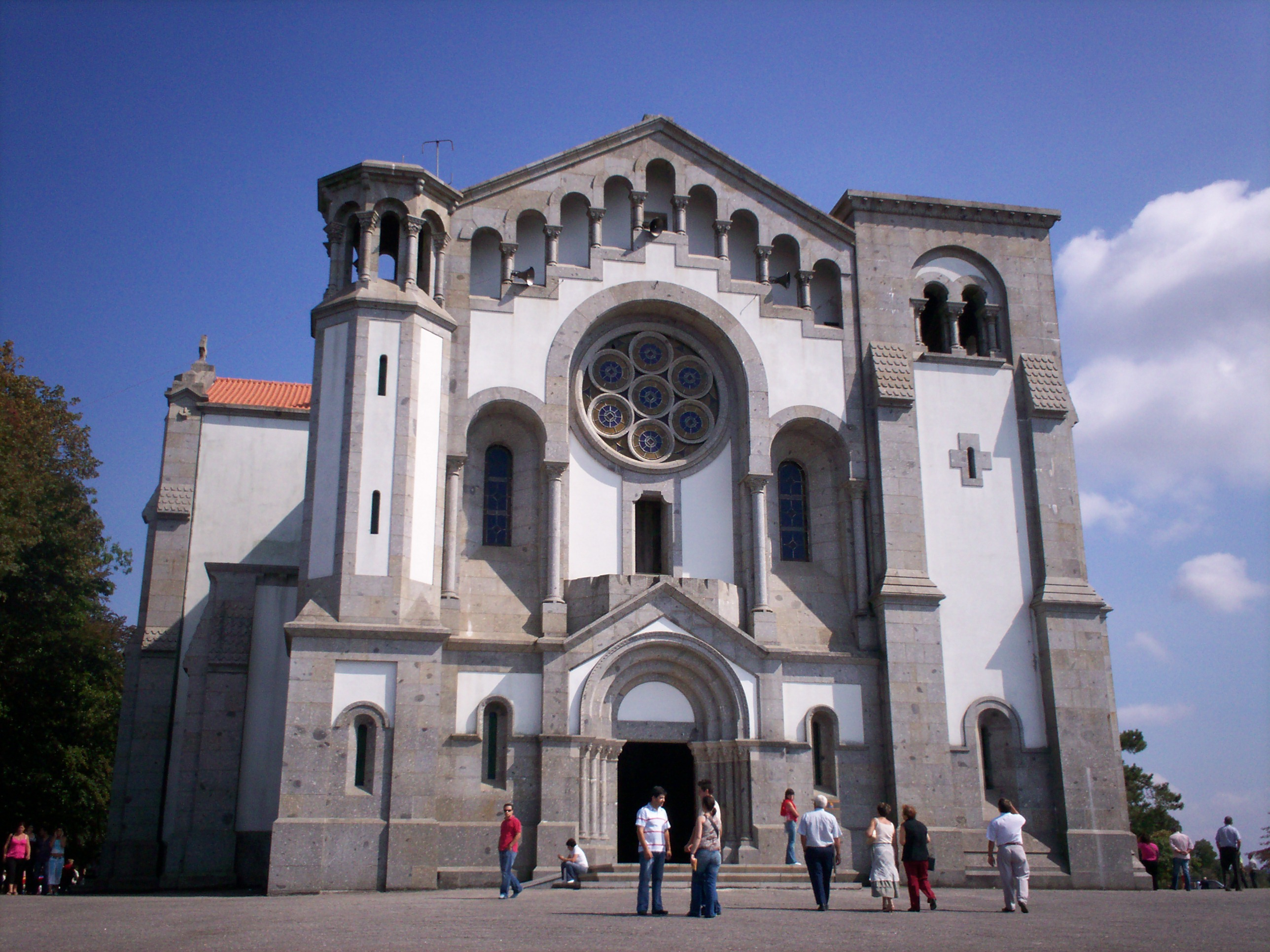
The Church of Nossa Senhora da Assunção overlooking the parishes of Santo Tirso and Monte Córdova

São Salvador de Monte Córdova is an ancient parish that was first mentioned in recorded documents in 959.

Roman forces occupied this region, in order to pacify its population, as part of its occupation from the Pyrenees to the Atlantic, Canterbury to the Mediterranean. They forced a restructuring of society, promoting the occupation of the open plains rather than the hilltops, which were typical at the time. The difficulty encountered by the Romans in this area, resulted in the Greek historian Strabo identifying the Lusitanian region and its peoples as the most powerful groups in the Iberian Peninsula.

On Monte Padrão existed the ruins of a castro. The Castro of Monte Padrão, until the end of the 16th century, existed as the parochial church, being under the primitive monastery of Celanova, in Galicia.

== Geography ==
The civil parish of Monte Córdova is situated 30 kilometres from Porto, and accessible by the EN105 motorway to many of the local communities, including Braga, Famalicão and Guimarães.

For many centuries, the geomorphology of the terrain was responsible for the relative isolation of its populations. The parish is located at about 410–420 metres above sea level, in an area called the Agrela da Assunção escarpment. Alto de Cabanas is one of the best natural lookouts in the region, and the area of Valinhas, with its monumental oak forests and curious chapel, near the Fervença waterfalls (or the Leça River), are almost obligatory natural sites of the landscape.

== Economy ==
For a long time Monte Córdova was considered the "breadbasket" of Santo Tirso (Celeiro de Santo Tirso). However, primary activities have diminished considerably over time so that the totality of the lands cultivated today only provide subsistence resources for the local community, or to complement family income. The secondary economic activities are dominated by industries such as sawmilling, carpentry and associated services.

== Architecture ==
The parish of Monte Córdova has many cultural monuments and buildings spread throughout its territory, but the following have been classified in the National Registry of Patrimony by IGESPAR:

=== Civic ===
- Castro of Monte Padrão (Castro de Monte Padrão)
- Monte Córdova Primary School (Escola Primária de Monte Cordova)
- Pereiras' Sierra Hydraulic Building (Edifício da Serra Hidráulica de Pereiras)

=== Religious ===
- Chapel of São Gonçalo (Capela de São Gonçalo)
- Church of Nossa Senhora da Assunção (Igreja da Nossa Senhora da Assunção) - designed by the Italian architect Korrrodi, the basilica-like church houses the image of Nossa Senhora da Assunção (Our Lady of the Assumption), considered one of the best conserved sculptures from the late 19th century sculptor João da Fonseca Lapa.

== Culture ==
Annually, there are pilgrimages in honour of São Salvador, in the area of Santa Luzia involving its 12th century chapel.
