= Várzea Grande =

Várzea Grande may refer to one of the following locations in Brazil:

- Várzea Grande, Mato Grosso
- Várzea Grande, Piauí
- Várzea Grande, Pindobaçu

== See also ==
- Várzea (disambiguation)
