= São Mamede de Negrelos =

Negrelos (São Mamede)
- Civil parish
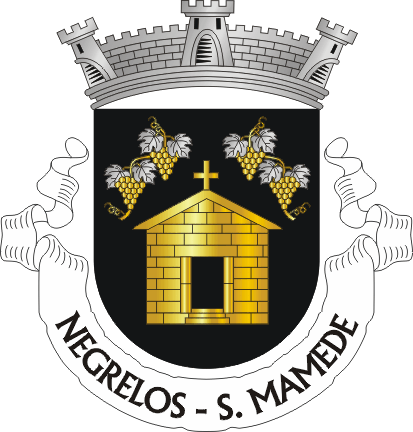
- Coat of arms

- Location in Portugal
- Coordinates: 41°20′54″N 8°20′37″W
- Country: Portugal
- Region: Norte
- Metropolitan area: Porto
- District: Porto
- Municipality: Santo Tirso
- Disbanded: 2013

Area
  - Total: 4.77 km^{2} (1.84 sq mi)

Population (2001)
  - Total: 2,288
  - Density: 480/km^{2} (1,240/sq mi)
- Time zone: UTC+00:00 (WET)
  - Summer (DST): UTC+01:00 (WEST)

Negrelos (São Mamede) is a former civil parish in the municipality of Santo Tirso, Portugal. In 2013, the parish merged into the new parish Campo (São Martinho), São Salvador do Campo e Negrelos (São Mamede).
