= Lamelas =

- Civil parish
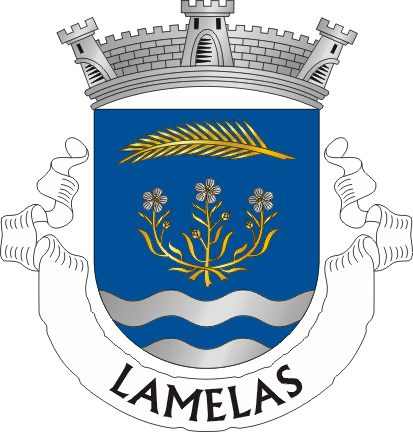
- Coat of arms

- Location in Portugal
- Coordinates: 41°17′24″N 8°28′29″W
- Country: Portugal
- Region: Norte
- Metropolitan area: Porto
- District: Porto
- Municipality: Santo Tirso
- Disbanded: 2013

Area
  - Total: 4.77 km^{2} (1.84 sq mi)

Population (2001)
  - Total: 953
  - Density: 200/km^{2} (517/sq mi)
- Time zone: UTC+00:00 (WET)
  - Summer (DST): UTC+01:00 (WEST)

Lamelas is a former civil parish in the municipality of Santo Tirso, Portugal. In 2013, the parish merged into the new parish Lamelas e Guimarei. It is located 6 km south of the city of Santo Tirso in the Leça Valley, is an agriculture center.
