= Greater Metropolitan Area of Minho =

Greater Metropolitan Area of Minho (Portuguese: Grande Área Metropolitana do Minho) is a former administrative division in Portugal. Founded in 2004, it consisted of 12 municipalities in the north of the country: Amares, Barcelos, Braga, Cabeceiras de Basto, Fafe, Guimarães, Póvoa de Lanhoso, Terras de Bouro, Vieira do Minho, Vila Nova de Famalicão, Vila Verde and Vizela, all of them part of the former Braga District. It was disbanded in 2009, when the intermunicipal communities Ave and Cávado were formed.

== See also ==
- Metropolitan areas in Portugal
- Minho Province
