= Água Longa =

- Civil parish
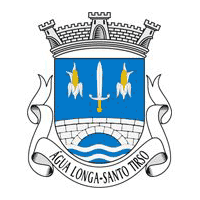
- Coat of arms

- Location in Portugal
- Coordinates: 41.255°N 8.491°W
- Country: Portugal
- Region: Norte
- Metropolitan area: Porto
- District: Porto
- Municipality: Santo Tirso

Area
  - Total: 12.87 km^{2} (4.97 sq mi)

Population (2011)
  - Total: 2,207
  - Density: 171.5/km^{2} (444.1/sq mi)
- Time zone: UTC+00:00 (WET)
  - Summer (DST): UTC+01:00 (WEST)

Água Longa is a civil parish in the municipality of Santo Tirso, Portugal. The population in 2011 was 2,207, in an area of 12.87 km^{2}.
