= São Vicente do Paul e Vale de Figueira =

- Civil parish
- Location in Portugal
- Coordinates: 39.35°N 8.61°W
- Country: Portugal
- Region: Oeste e Vale do Tejo
- Intermunic. comm.: Lezíria do Tejo
- District: Santarém
- Municipality: Santarém

Area
  - Total: 71.82 km^{2} (27.73 sq mi)

Population (2011)
  - Total: 2,917
  - Density: 41/km^{2} (110/sq mi)
- Time zone: UTC+00:00 (WET)
  - Summer (DST): UTC+01:00 (WEST)

São Vicente do Paul e Vale de Figueira is a civil parish in the municipality of Santarém, Portugal. It was formed in 2013 by the merger of the former parishes São Vicente do Paul and Vale de Figueira. The population in 2011 was 2,917, in an area of 71.82 km^{2}.
