= Caldas de São Jorge =

Former civil parish in Portugal

- Civil parish
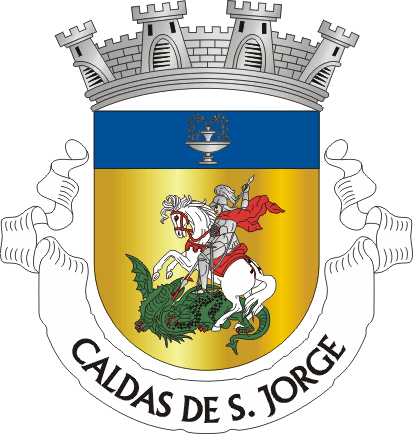
- Coat of arms

- Location in Portugal
- Coordinates: 40°58′N 8°30′W
- Country: Portugal
- Region: Norte
- Metropolitan area: Porto
- District: Aveiro
- Municipality: Santa Maria da Feira
- Disbanded: 2013

Area
  - Total: 4.70 km^{2} (1.81 sq mi)

Population (2001)
  - Total: 2,728
  - Density: 580/km^{2} (1,500/sq mi)
- Time zone: UTC+00:00 (WET)
  - Summer (DST): UTC+01:00 (WEST)

Caldas de São Jorge is a former civil parish in the municipality of Santa Maria da Feira, Portugal. In 2013, the parish merged into the new parish Caldas de São Jorge e Pigeiros. It has a population of 2,728 inhabitants and a total area of 4.70 km^{2}.

The major attraction of the town is the spa and its hotel.
