= Refojos de Riba de Ave =

- Civil parish
- Location in Portugal
- Coordinates: 41°17′37″N 8°26′59″W
- Country: Portugal
- Region: Norte
- Metropolitan area: Porto
- District: Porto
- Municipality: Santo Tirso
- Disbanded: 2013

Area
  - Total: 5.54 km^{2} (2.14 sq mi)

Population (2001)
  - Total: 1,106
  - Density: 200/km^{2} (520/sq mi)
- Time zone: UTC+00:00 (WET)
  - Summer (DST): UTC+01:00 (WEST)

Refojos de Riba de Ave is a former civil parish in the municipality of Santo Tirso, Portugal. In 2013, the parish merged into the new parish Carreira e Refojos de Riba de Ave. It is located 6 southeast of the city of Santo Tirso.
