= Lobão (Santa Maria da Feira) =

Former civil parish in Portugal

- Civil parish
- Location in Portugal
- Coordinates: 40°59′N 8°29′W
- Country: Portugal
- Region: Norte
- Metropolitan area: Porto
- District: Aveiro
- Municipality: Santa Maria da Feira
- Disbanded: 2013

Area
  - Total: 7.91 km^{2} (3.05 sq mi)

Population (2001)
  - Total: 5,761
  - Density: 728/km^{2} (1,890/sq mi)
- Time zone: UTC+00:00 (WET)
  - Summer (DST): UTC+01:00 (WEST)

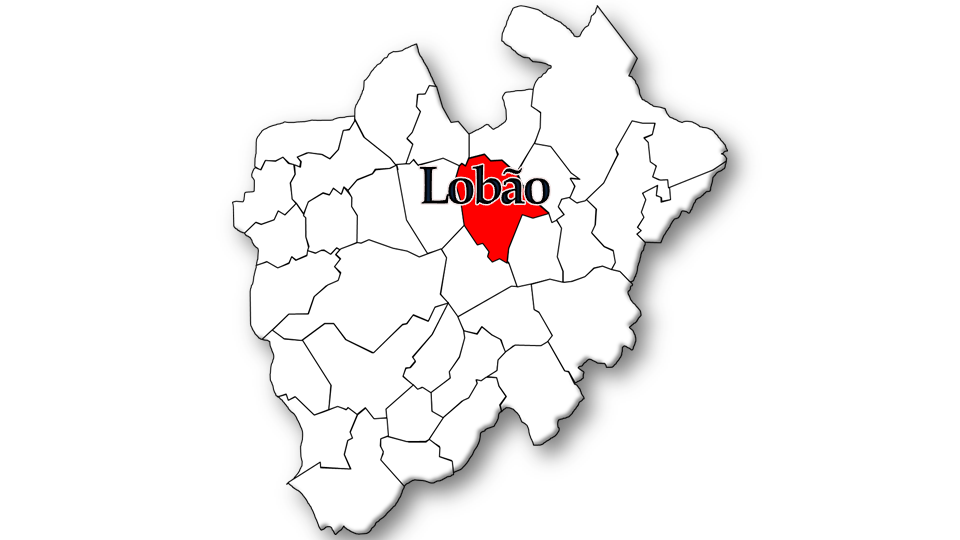
Map of Lobão, Portugal

Lobão is a former civil parish in the municipality of Santa Maria da Feira, Portugal. In 2013, the parish merged into the new parish Lobão, Gião, Louredo e Guisande. It has a population of 5,761 inhabitants and a total area of 7.91 km^{2}.

== Origin of the name ==
The toponym of the name is a personal name, it was named in 906 with Lupon and in 967 as Lubon. It is derived from Lupu and with a suffix -one It exists on a document in the year 1055 which mentioned a settlement as Lopone.

== Economy ==
Its principal economical activities are civil construction, iron, wood, textile, metallurgy and a few others, the commercial, services and agriculture dominates the remainder of the parish's economy.
