= Vilarinho (Santo Tirso) =

- Civil parish
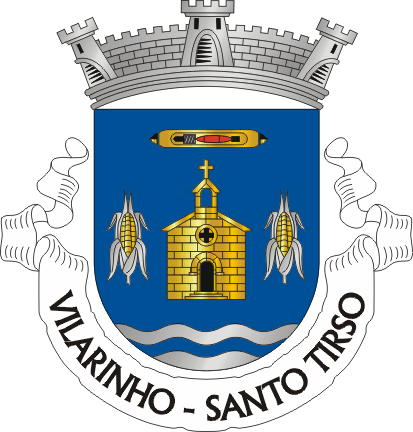
- Coat of arms

- Location in Portugal
- Coordinates: 41.371°N 8.337°W
- Country: Portugal
- Region: Norte
- Metropolitan area: Porto
- District: Porto
- Municipality: Santo Tirso

Area
  - Total: 5.27 km^{2} (2.03 sq mi)

Population (2011)
  - Total: 3,788
  - Density: 720/km^{2} (1,900/sq mi)
- Time zone: UTC+00:00 (WET)
  - Summer (DST): UTC+01:00 (WEST)
- Website: http://www.jfvilarinho.pt/

Vilarinho is a parish in the municipality of Santo Tirso in Portugal. The population in 2011 was 3,788, in an area of 5.27 km^{2}. It is an important industry center located 15 km north east of the city of Santo Tirso near other important textile centers like Vizela and Guimarães.
