= Avelal =

- Civil parish
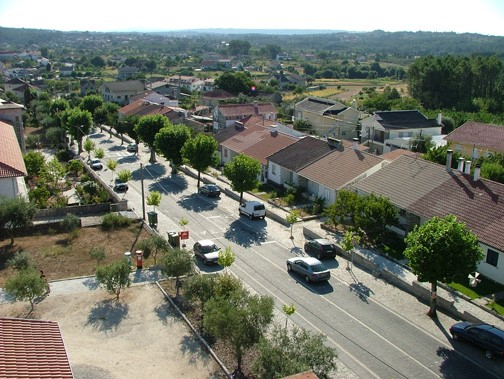
- View of Avelal.

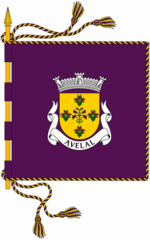
- Flag

- Location in Portugal
- Coordinates: 40°45′11″N 7°41′0″W
- Country: Portugal
- Region: Centro
- Intermunic. comm.: Viseu Dão Lafões
- District: Viseu
- Municipality: Sátão

Area
  - Total: 6.81 km^{2} (2.63 sq mi)
- Elevation: 622 m (2,041 ft)

Population (2011)
  - Total: 529
  - Density: 77.7/km^{2} (201/sq mi)
- Time zone: UTC+00:00 (WET)
  - Summer (DST): UTC+01:00 (WEST)

Avelal is a civil parish in the municipality of Sátão, Portugal. The population in 2011 was 529, in an area of 6.81 km^{2}.
