= Moçarria =

- Civil parish
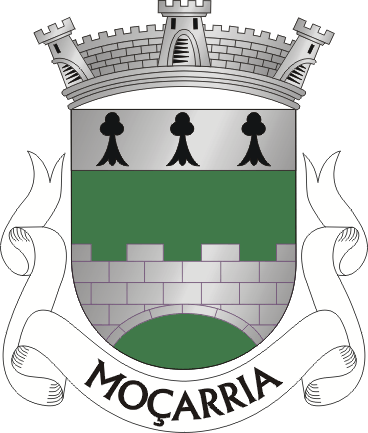
- Coat of arms

- Location in Portugal
- Coordinates: 39.284°N 8.777°W
- Country: Portugal
- Region: Oeste e Vale do Tejo
- Intermunic. comm.: Lezíria do Tejo
- District: Santarém
- Municipality: Santarém

Area
  - Total: 12.11 km^{2} (4.68 sq mi)

Population (2001)
  - Total: 1,072
  - Density: 88.52/km^{2} (229.3/sq mi)
- Time zone: UTC+00:00 (WET)
  - Summer (DST): UTC+01:00 (WEST)

Moçarria is a parish in the municipality of Santarém, Portugal, with 12.11 km^{2} (5 sq mi) of area and 1072 inhabitants (2001).

Situated on a hill in the area called the "Neighborhood" from Santarém near the municipality of Rio Maior by the west, the parish of Moçarria distances 11 km (7 mi) from town. Historian believes that the toponym Moçarria is of Arab origin or Mozarabic (musta'rib or muzarra) which means Joy.
