= Vale de Figueira =

Extinct civil parish in Santarém, Portugal

Coordinates: 39°018′026″N 8°037′039″W

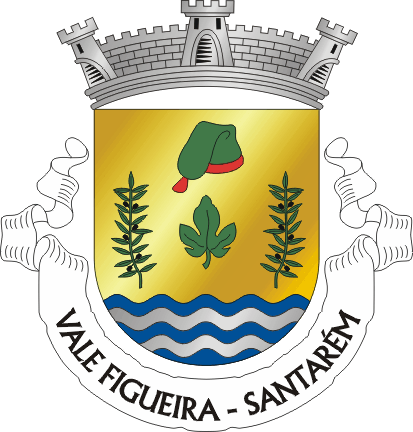

Vale de Figueira is a former civil parish in the municipality of Santarém, Portugal. In 2013, the parish merged into the new parish São Vicente do Paul e Vale de Figueira. The village has almost 2,000 inhabitants. It is close to Santarém, the capital city of its region, Ribatejo. It sits on a valley, parallel to the Bela Vista plateau, being famous for the mouth of the river Alviela, a tributary of Tagus river, inserted on the diversity of colours which, all combined, create a picturesque landscape.

It is a land of campinos (the regional name given to the cattle herders), horses, bulls and nature that help making Vale de Figueira a unique place in the Ribatejo region. The village is rich in the production of vine and cereals.

There is not a consensus, but most believe the origin of the name Vale de Figueira comes from the no-longer existing coating of fig trees that used to cover the area. Still, its foundation is believed to be from the Roman Empire times and the village has been graced by the visit of some Portuguese royalty throughout time and more recently by some Presidents of the Portuguese Republic, such as Américo Thomaz.

Also, the village had a Franciscan Friars' Monastery, named as "Convent of Our Lady of Jesus from St. Francis Order", from which there are only a few ruins left, including a window said to be the window from where the friars would give out food to the poor.

The beautiful meadowlands of Vale de Figueira, known as Lezíria, are bathed by both rivers Tagus and Alviela and are famous for their beauty. Actually, since 2008, a project known as Rota dos Avieiros has been initiated to help develop, touristically, villages like Vale de Figueira so, a series of paths have been created along the rivers and into the woods, making it possible to explore the best of this village's nature and wildness beauty. As for the village itself, touristic guide visits are being studied, as well as some water and extreme sports, among other leisure and cultural activities, but all depends on the funds provided by the government for the effect.

Also famous are the many farms (Quinta (rural)) in and about the village, each with precious content that goes from ancient chariots, used by the rich families of the farms, to chapels decorated with gold and other valuable and ornamental materials from previous centuries. Good examples are Quinta do Castilho, Quinta de Nossa Senhora da Conceição and Quinta da Boa Vista. Some of these farms are also very famous for their livestocks (ganadarias) of bulls, cows and horses. Another farm which is worth to be visited for its own woods and villa with swimming pool and garden is Quinta da Sobreira.

In the beginning of the 20th century, Vale de Figueira was very rich in the production of olive oil with six olive oil mills working altogether. This is why the olive tree leaves are represented in its coat flag, along with the fig tree leave and the campino's hat, all above the blue and silver lines that symbolise the rivers Alviela and Tagus.

== Sources ==
- http://www.cm-santarem.pt/santarem/Autarquia/JuntasFreguesia/Freguesia+de+Vale+de+Figueira.htm
