= São Tomé de Negrelos =

- Civil parish
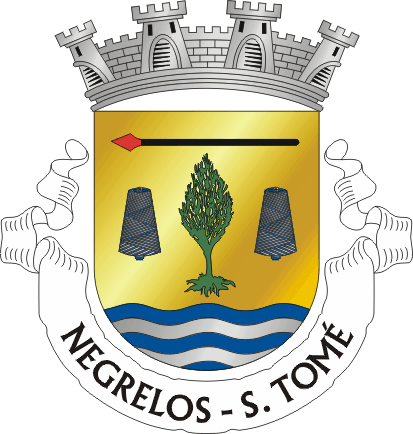
- Coat of arms

- Location in Portugal
- Coordinates: 41.348°N 8.404°W
- Country: Portugal
- Region: Norte
- Metropolitan area: Porto
- District: Porto
- Municipality: Santo Tirso

Area
  - Total: 6.12 km^{2} (2.36 sq mi)

Population (2011)
  - Total: 4,032
  - Density: 659/km^{2} (1,710/sq mi)
- Time zone: UTC+00:00 (WET)
  - Summer (DST): UTC+01:00 (WEST)

São Tomé de Negrelos is located 10 km northeast of the city of Santo Tirso near Vila das Aves. Located in the north of Portugal. The population in 2011 was 4,032, in an area of 6.12 km².
