= Várzea Nova =

Coordinates: 11°15′32″S 40°56′31″W

- Municipality
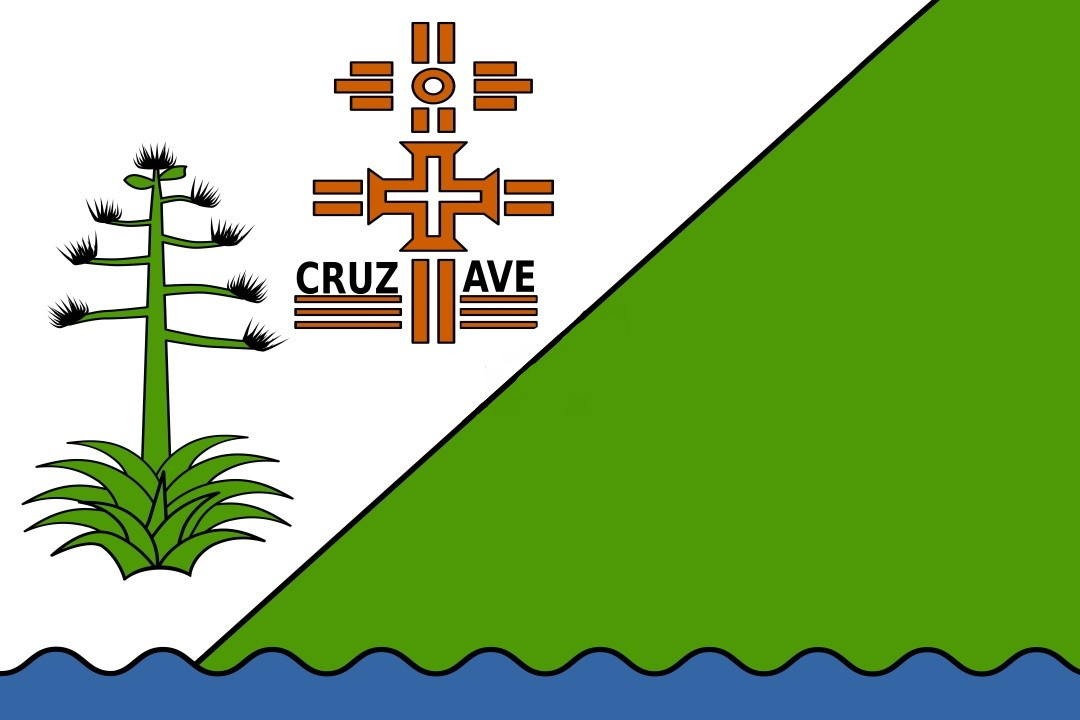
- Flag Coat of arms

- Localization of Várzea Nova in Bahia, Brazil
- Coordinates: 11° 15' 32" S 40° 56' 31" O
- Country: Brazil
- Region: Northeast
- State: Bahia
- Mesoregion: Jacobina

Government
  - Mayor: João Hebert Araújo da Silva (2021 - 2024)

Area
  - Total: 473,320 sq mi (1,225,892 km^{2})
- Elevation: 2,385 ft (727 m)

Population (2022)
  - Total: 13.377
  - Density: 28.4/sq mi (10.96/km^{2})
- Time zone: UTC−3 (BRT)
- ZIP Code: 44.690-000
- Area code: +55 74
- Website: https://www.varzeanova.ba.gov.br/

Várzea Nova is a municipality in the state of Bahia in the Northeast of Brazil.

== See also ==
- List of municipalities in Bahia
