= Guisande (Santa Maria da Feira) =

Former civil parish in Portugal

- Civil parish
- Location in Portugal
- Coordinates: 40°58′18″N 8°28′21″W
- Country: Portugal
- Region: Norte
- Metropolitan area: Porto
- District: Aveiro
- Municipality: Santa Maria da Feira
- Disbanded: 2013

Area
  - Total: 3.78 km^{2} (1.46 sq mi)

Population (2001)
  - Total: 1,474
  - Density: 390/km^{2} (1,000/sq mi)
- Time zone: UTC+00:00 (WET)
  - Summer (DST): UTC+01:00 (WEST)

Guisande (Portuguese pronunciation: [ɡiˈsɐ̃dɨ]) is a former civil parish in the municipality of Santa Maria da Feira, Portugal. In 2013, the parish merged into the new parish Lobão, Gião, Louredo e Guisande. It has a population of 1,474 inhabitants and a total area of 3.78 km^{2}. Guisande is located approximately 30 km south of Porto and 320 km north from the capital city of Lisbon.

== Sites of interests ==
- Casa da Quintão (Outeiro)
- Casa do Loureiro (Barrosa)
- Casa do Moreira (Igreja)
- Casa Almeida (Cimo de Vila)
- Casa do Souto (Casaldaça)
- Casa Santiago (Quintães)
- Casa do Bacêlo (Fornos)
- Casa do Sr. Gomes (Reguengo)
- Cruzeiro (Igreja)
- Alminhas (Igreja, Cimo de Vila, Estôse, Casaldaça)
- Escola Primária do Viso

== Localities ==
- Igreja
- Quintães
- Viso
- Cimo de Vila
- Outeiro
- Estôse
- Pereirada
- Leira
- Gândara
- Casaldaça
- Lama
- Fornos
- Barrosa
- Reguengo

== Associations ==
- Guisande F.C.
- Associação Cultural de Guisande (literally the Guisande Cultural Association) "O Despertar"
