= Ricardo Carvalho (footballer, born 1996) =

Portuguese footballer

Personal information
- Full name: Ricardo Jorge Gomes Carvalho
- Date of birth: 6 March 1996 (age 30)
- Place of birth: Santo Tirso, Portugal
- Height: 1.85 m (6 ft 1 in)
- Position: Centre back

Team information
- Current team: AR São Martinho

Youth career
- 2007–2013: Vitória Guimarães
- 2013–2015: Benfica

Senior career*
Years	Team	Apps	(Gls)
2015	Benfica B	0	(0)
2016–2018	Vitória Guimarães B	33	(0)
2018–2019	Salamanca	14	(0)
2019–2020	Villarrubia	25	(0)
2020–2021	Almería B	25	(0)
2021–	AR São Martinho	39	(1)

International career
2011	Portugal U15	2	(0)
2011–2012	Portugal U16	12	(0)
2012–2013	Portugal U17	12	(1)
2013–2014	Portugal U18	5	(0)
- * Club domestic league appearances and goals as of 2 April 2023

Ricardo Jorge Gomes Carvalho (born 6 March 1996) is a Portuguese professional footballer who plays for AR São Martinho as a defender.

== Career ==
Born in Santo Tirso, Carvalho started his career at Vitória de Guimarães in 2007. In 2013, he joined Benfica's youth system and was promoted to Benfica B in 2015, but did not play any match. In 2016, he returned to Guimarães where he debuted professionally on 9 March, with Vitória Guimarães B in a 2015–16 LigaPro match against UD Oliveirense.

On 31 August 2018, Carvalho moved abroad for the first time in his career, after agreeing to a contract with Segunda División B side Salamanca CF.
