= Penso =

Penso is a surname. Notable people with the surname include:

- Chris Penso (born 1982), American soccer referee
- Francesco Penso (1665–1737), Italian sculptor
- Hazdayi Penso (1914–?), Turkish basketball player
- Tori Penso (born 1985/86), American soccer referee and player
