= Treixedo e Nagozela =

- Civil parish
- Location in Portugal
- Coordinates: 40.433°N 8.094°W
- Country: Portugal
- Region: Centro
- Intermunic. comm.: Viseu Dão Lafões
- District: Viseu
- Municipality: Santa Comba Dão

Area
  - Total: 19.62 km^{2} (7.58 sq mi)

Population (2011)
  - Total: 1,434
  - Density: 73/km^{2} (190/sq mi)
- Time zone: UTC+00:00 (WET)
  - Summer (DST): UTC+01:00 (WEST)

Treixedo e Nagozela is a civil parish in the municipality of Santa Comba Dão, Portugal. It was formed in 2013 by the merger of the former parishes Treixedo and Nagozela. The population in 2011 was 1,434, in an area of 19.62 km^{2}.
