= Roriz (Santo Tirso) =

- Civil parish
- Location in Portugal
- Coordinates: 41.345°N 8.382°W
- Country: Portugal
- Region: Norte
- Metropolitan area: Porto
- District: Porto
- Municipality: Santo Tirso

Area
  - Total: 6.17 km^{2} (2.38 sq mi)

Population (2011)
  - Total: 3,665
  - Density: 594/km^{2} (1,540/sq mi)
- Time zone: UTC+00:00 (WET)
  - Summer (DST): UTC+01:00 (WEST)

Roriz is an urban parish located 10 km northeast of the city of Santo Tirso, in Portugal. It is a major industrial center. The population in 2011 was 3,665, in an area of 6.17 km².
