= Escurquela =

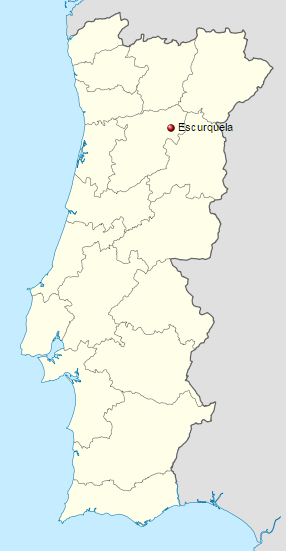
- Location of Escurquela
- Etymology: Escurquela, Portuguese derivative from Escurqnella
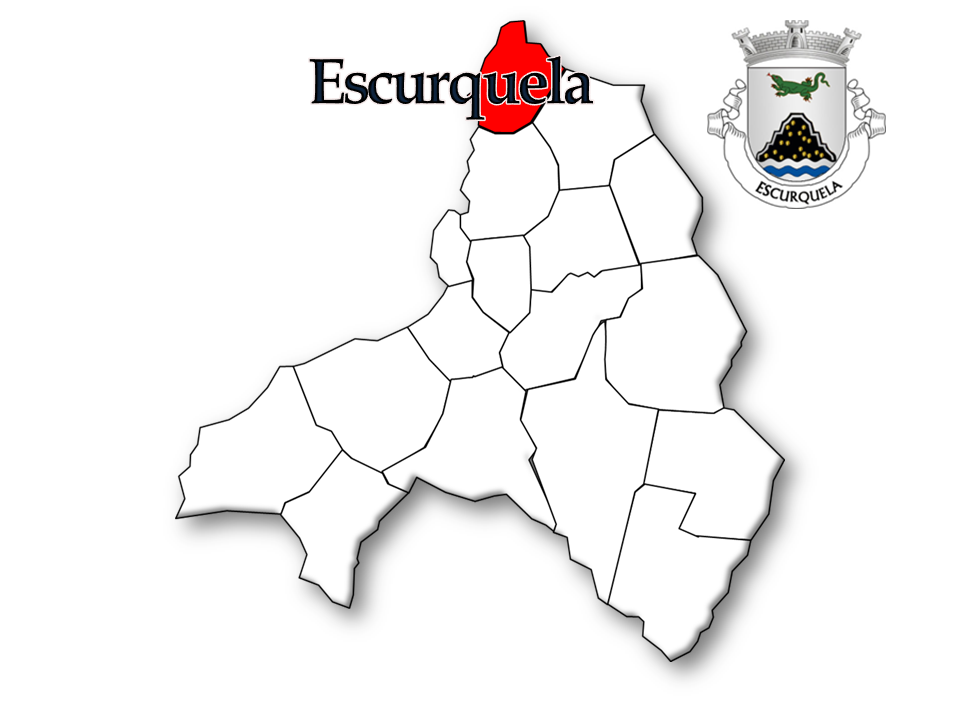
- Location of the civil parish of Escurquela in Sernancelhe municipality
- Coordinates: 41°00′23″N 7°31′15″W
- Country: Portugal
- NUTS II Region: Centro
- NUTS III Subregion: Douro
- District: Viseu
- Settlement: Prior to Reconquista
- Elevation: 630 m (2,070 ft)

Population (2011)
  - Total: 138
  - Density: 16.3/km^{2} (42/sq mi)
- Time zone: UTC0 (WET)
  - Summer (DST): UTC+1 (WEST)
- Postal Zone: 3640-060 ESCURQUELA
- Area Code & Prefix: (+351) 254-XXX-XXX

Escurquela is a small town in the north of Portugal. Located in the municipality of Sernancelhe, Viseu district, with a population of 138 (2011) is small hamlet located near the river Távora downstream of the Barragem do Vilar reservoir.

== Etymology ==
The name of Escurquela derives from the fact that it was a place of sentinel (esculca in Pre-Portuguese) to the castle of Sernancelhe. In 1767 already had the phonetic name of Escurquela, but written differently: "Escurquella". Escurquella or Escurquela, as is written today, comes from the term Esculqnella. Esculqunella is a diminutive of esculca (that signifies a place of sentinel).

== History ==
On the outskirts of Escurquela, the big mount of rocks called "Penedo de São Tiago" (Rock of Saint James in English) was during long times a very important place of sentinel. During the times of the Roman conquest, the tribes of Viriatus used the place as a sentinel location, nevertheless its climax as a military outpost occurred only in the Reconquista period. Rescued from the hands of the moors in the 11th century, during the time of the conquest of Paredes da Beira by the two brothers D. Thedou (Thedo or Thedon) and D.Rauzendo (or Rozendo) (descendants of the kings of León and originators of the house of the Távoras). On this epoch the place started to be a warning post for the castle of Sernancelhe and a place of shrine.

== Population ==
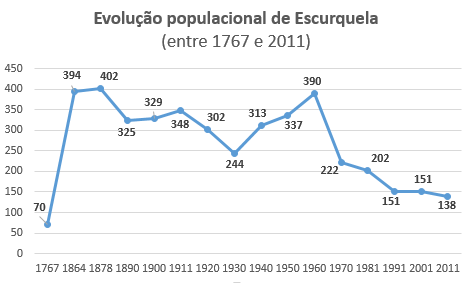
Evolution of the population of Escurquela between 1767 and 2011

Census of the population of the parish of Escurquela
1767	1864	1878	1890	1900	1911	1920	1930	1940	1950	1960	1970	1981	1991	2001	2011
70	394	402	325	329	348	302	244	313	337	390	255	202	151	154	138

Population Distribution by Age Groups
Ano	0–14 years old	15–24 years old	25–64 years old	> 65 years old	0–14 years old	15–24 years old	25–64 years old	> 65 years old
2001	27	23	57	44	17,9%	15,2%	37,7%	29,1%
2011	14	19	62	43	10,1%	13,8%	44,9%	31,2%

Average of the country in the 2001 census: 0/14 years old-16,0%; 15/24 years old-14,3%; 25/64 years old-53,4%; 65 and above years old-16,4%

Average of the country in the 2011: 0/14 years old-14,9%; 15/24 years old-10,9%; 25/64 years old-55,2%; 65 and above years old-19,0%

Evolution of the number of dwellings.
1757	1853	1873
60	86	110

== Landmarks ==
=== Religious landmarks ===
In this town there is a parish church, two chapels, a cemetery and two stone cross. The parish belongs to the diocese of Lamego and till 1834 the Recto of Fonte Arcada presented the priest to the parish.

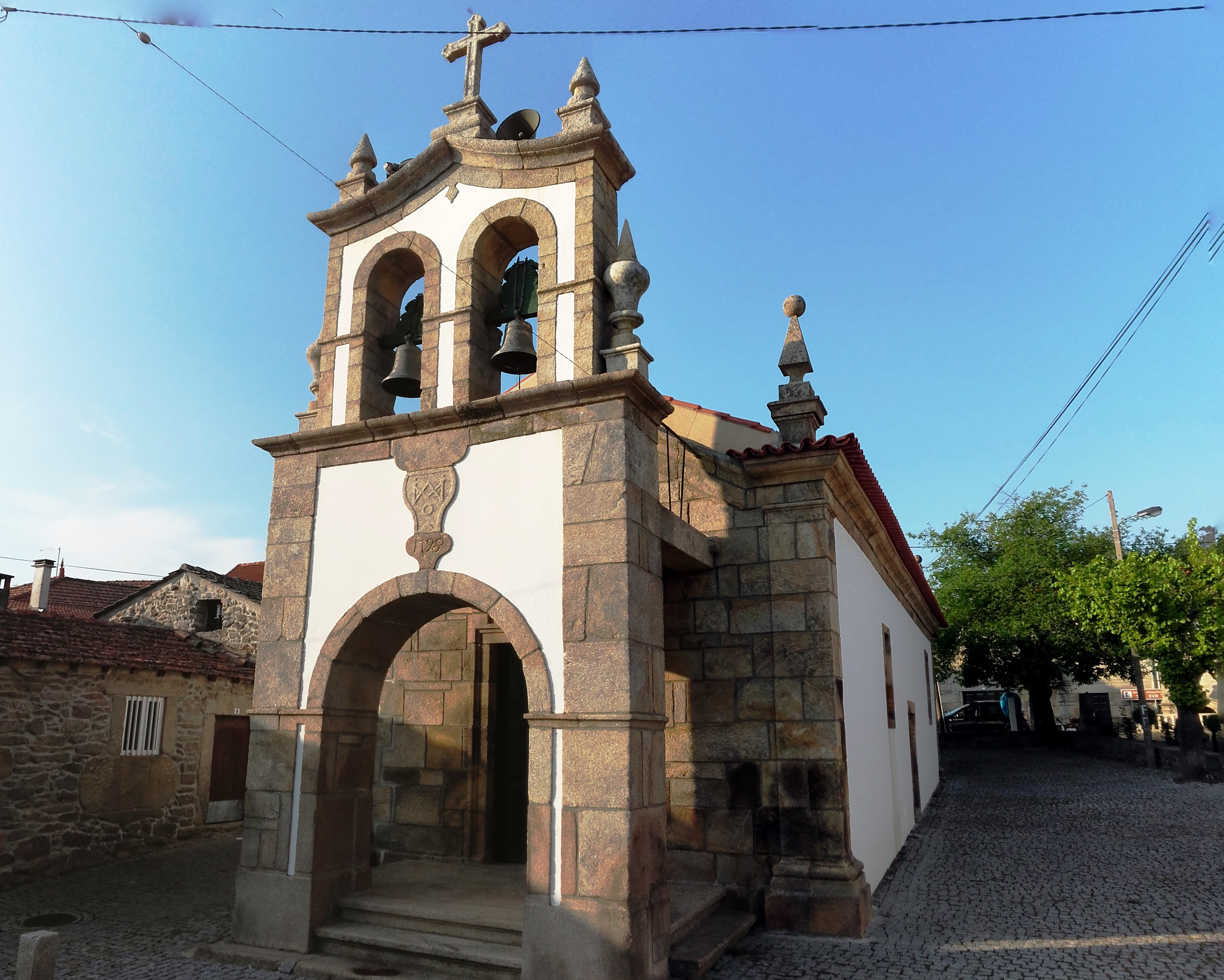
Parish church of Escurquela

The parish church is located in the middle of the town from east to west. Made with only one nave, the church is dedicated to Saint Dominic having an altar mor and two side altars. It still has the wooden ceiling liner nicely painted and the high altar richly gilded, both made in 1713 by the craftsman Manuel de Afonseca, on that time inhabitant of Escurquela. Unfortunately restorations done in the 21st century hide richly grave stone slabs that composed the floor of the church. Also with the changes driven by Paul VI, it was also added a middle altar in 1969.

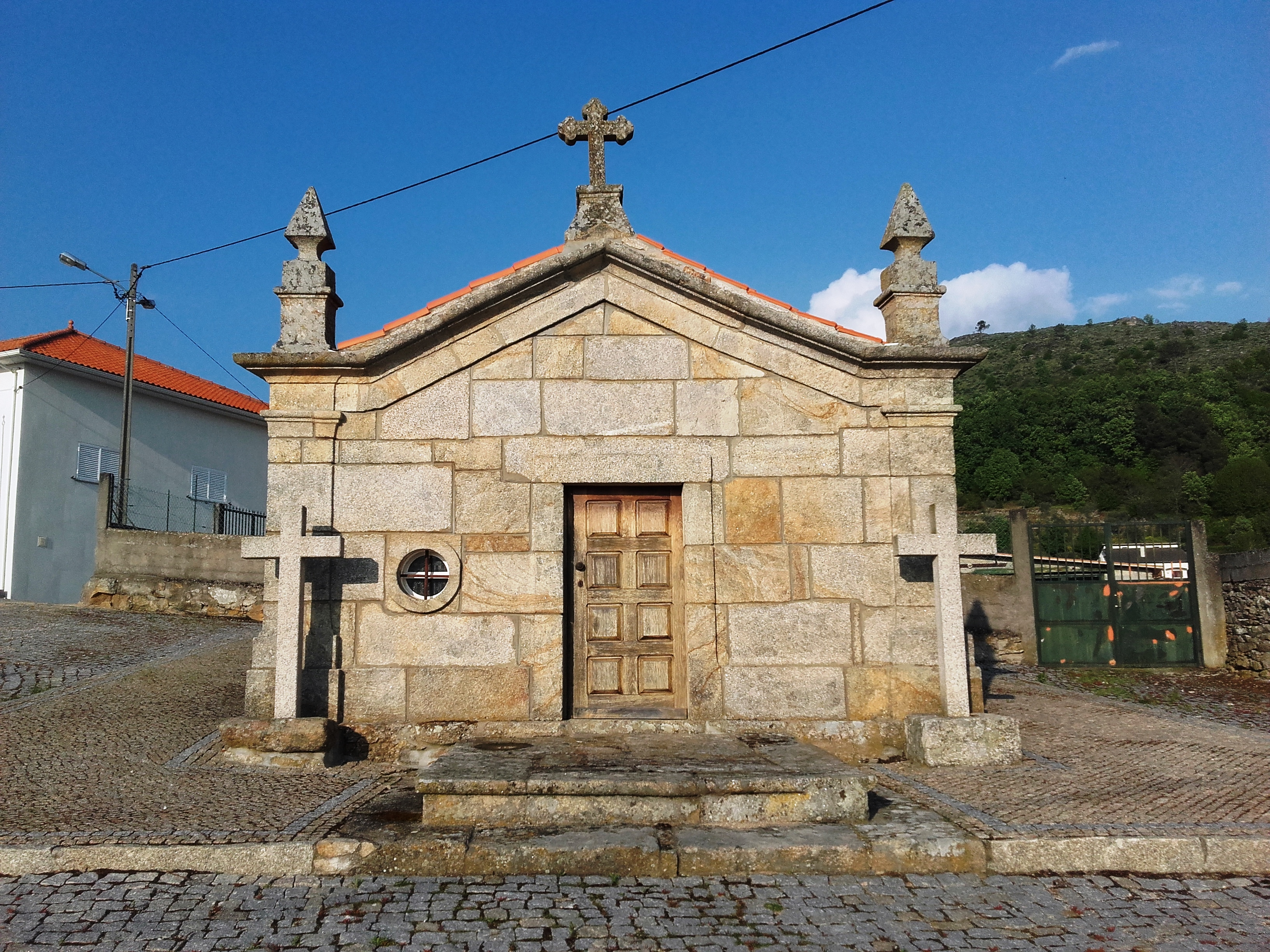
Chapel of St. Bárbara in Escurquela

On highest parts of the village, near the cemetery, there is also a very old chapel: the Capela de Santa Bárbara (Saint Barbara Chapel).

Outside the town, on the foothill of Penedo de São Tiago exists the chapel Capela de São Tiago (Saint James Chapel) that, according to tradition, was the first mother church. In relation to this temple, tradition attributes its current dedication to Saint James because there he appeared miraculously on a horse during a battle in which the Christians were being slaughtered by their enemies. With his encouragement, the Christians regained strength and came out winners. The footprint miraculously left by the horse's hoof on the stone, can still be observed by those who rise to the top of the "Penedo de São Tiago" (Rock of Saint James in English).

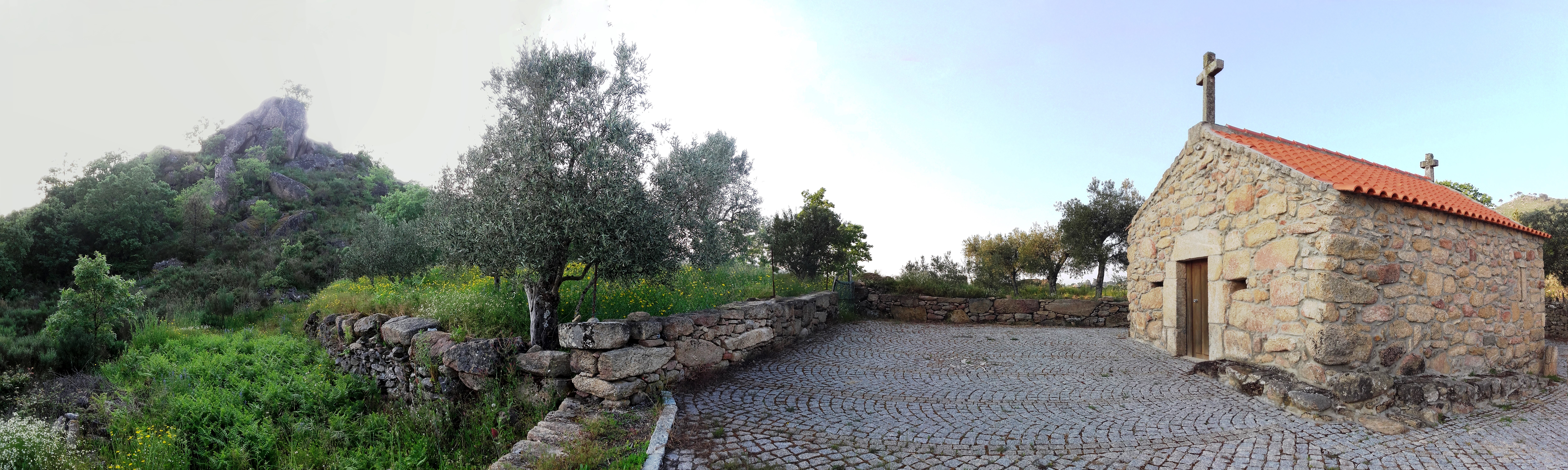
Rock of Saint James and chapel near Escurquela

=== Other landmarks of reference ===
In this hamlet there is also a XVIII stone fountain, a small manor house, a primary school and a public laundry tank for washing clothes (see Washhouses).

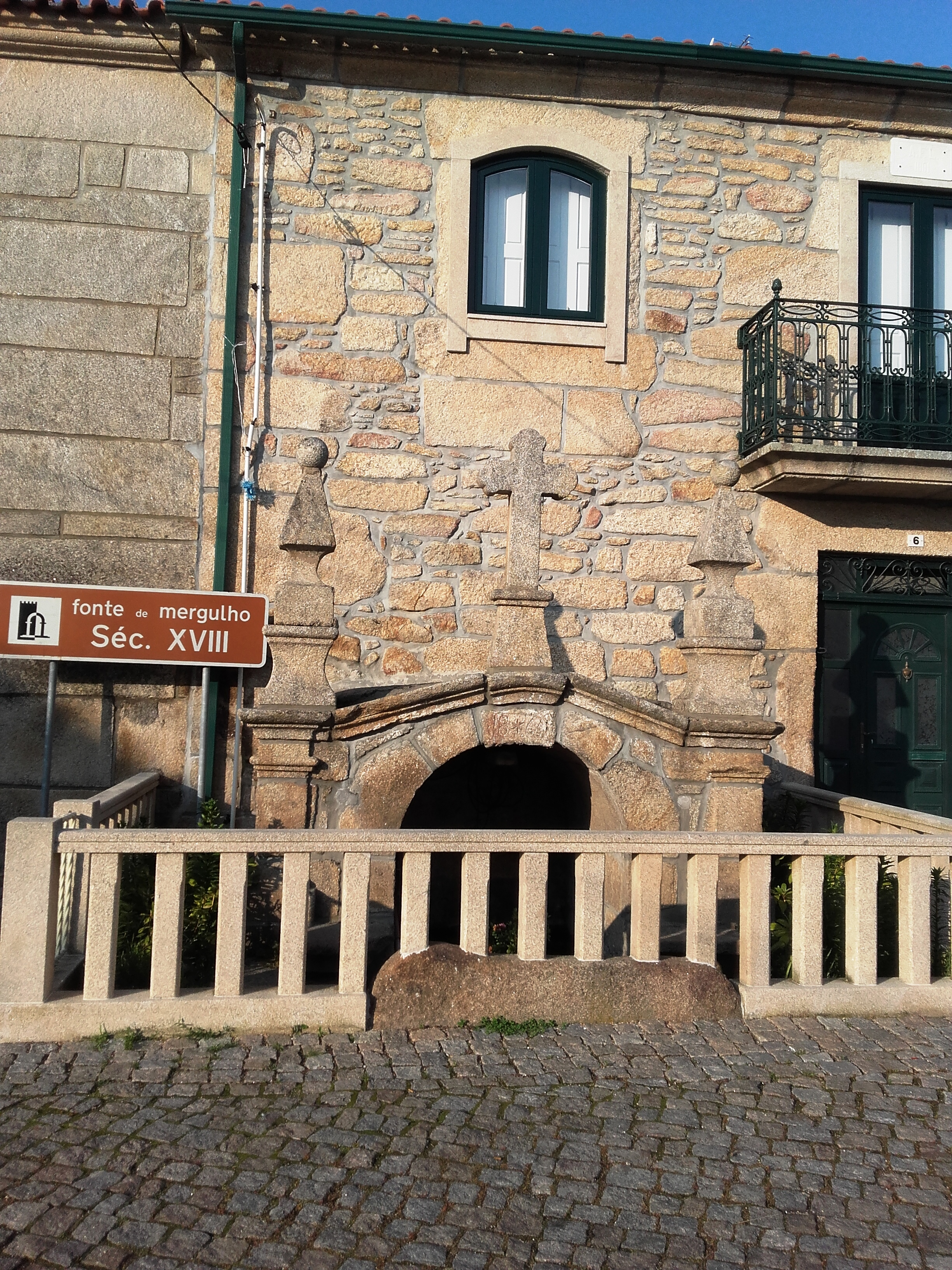
Stone fountain

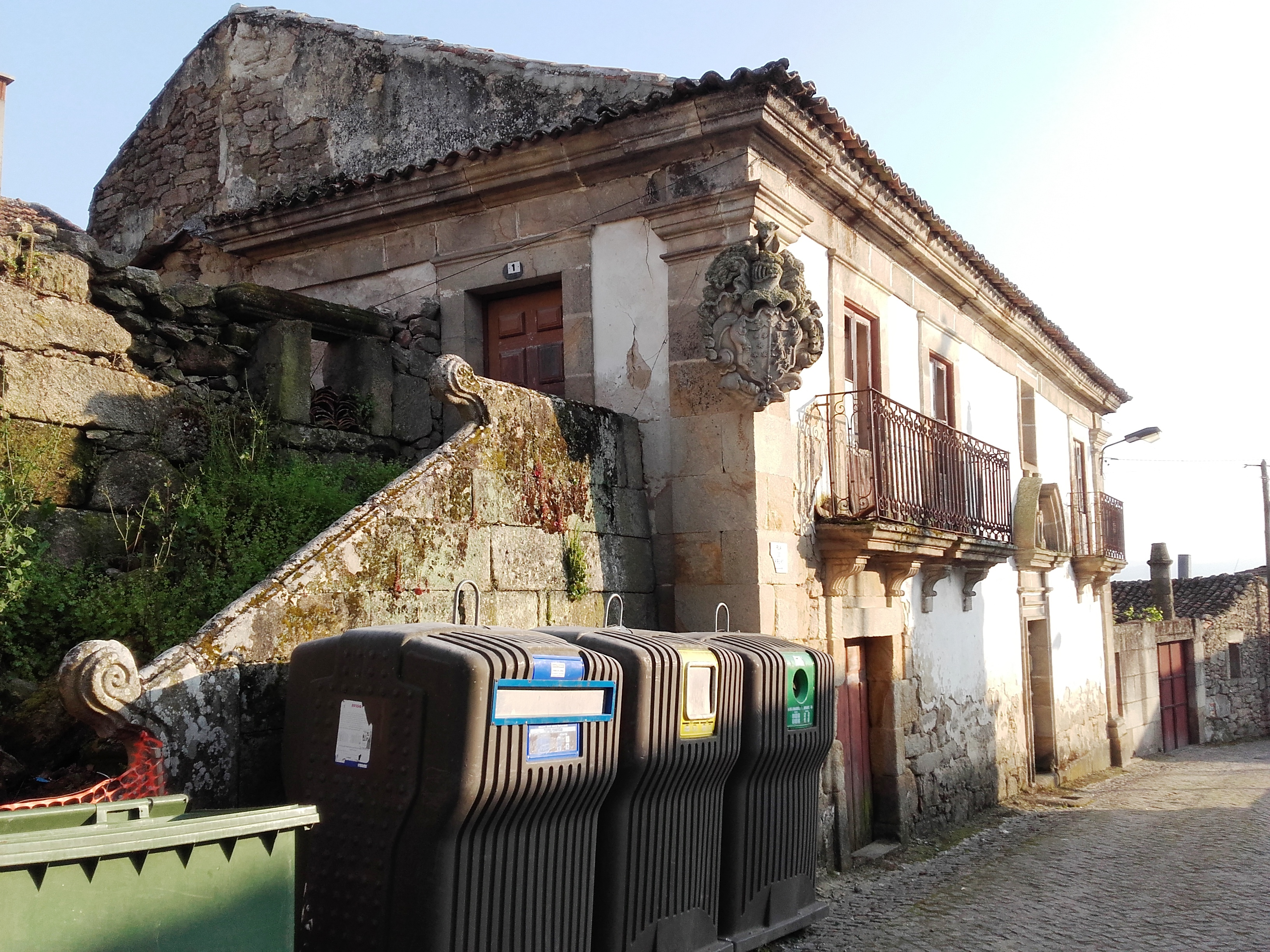
Manor house
