= Villarreal, Badajoz =

Villarreal
- Municipality
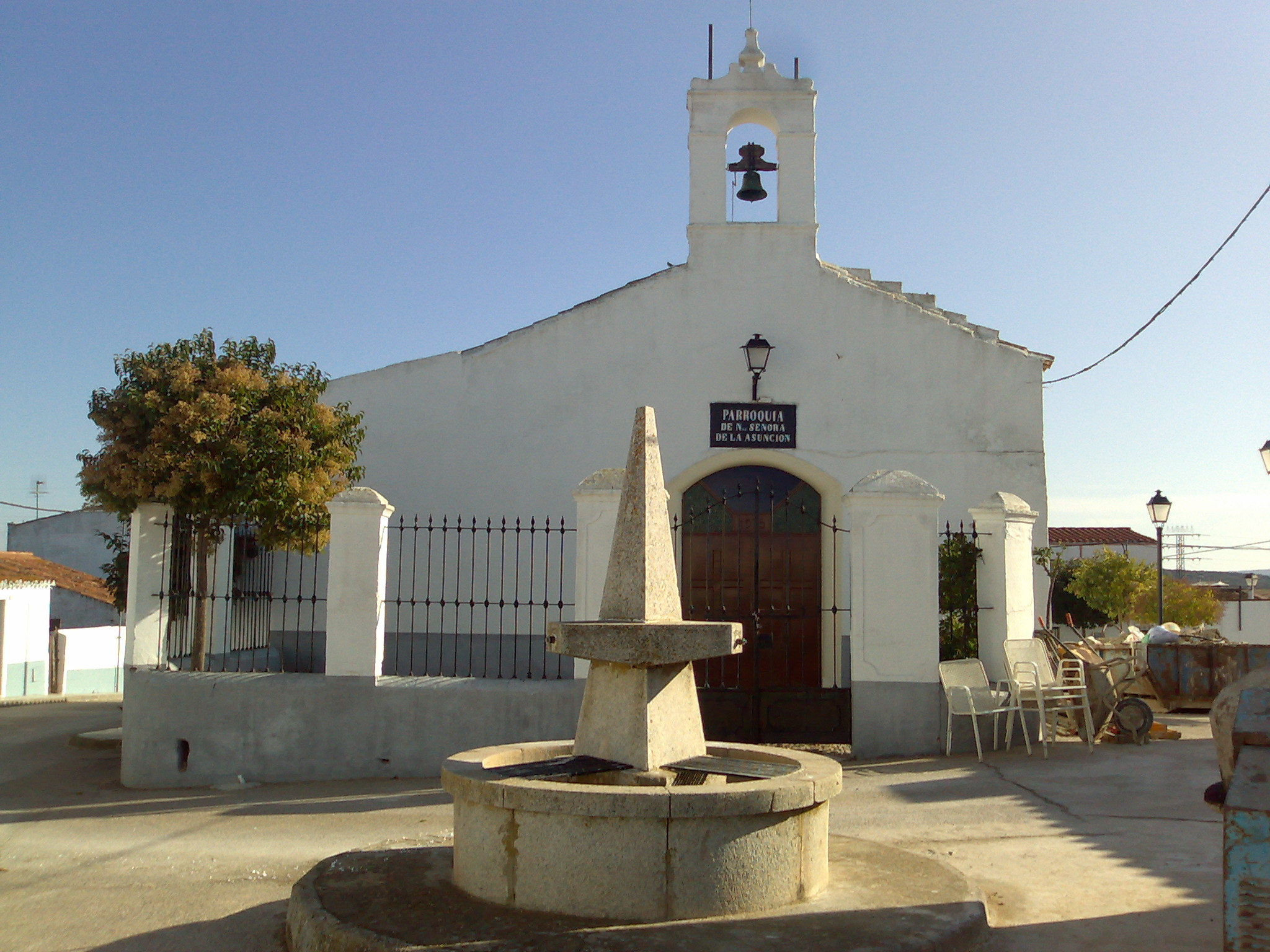

- Location within Extremadura Location within Spain
- Coordinates: 38°43′34.5″N 7°12′48.7″W
- Country: Spain (de facto); claimed by Portugal
- Autonomous community: Extremadura
- Province: Badajoz

Population (2007)
  - Total: 87

Villarreal (Vila Real in Portuguese) is a village located on the Guadiana river in the municipality of Olivenza, Spain.

== History ==
In the thirteenth century, King Sancho I of Portugal awarded the village to the military Order of Aviz, with Gonçalo Viegas being the commander of the area.

== Territorial dispute ==
Villarreal lies on the disputed section of the Portugal–Spain border, in front of the fortified villages of Juromenha and Alandroal. Historically it belonged not as now to Olivenza, but to Juromenha, and was called Aldeia da Ribeira. After its incorporation into the Kingdom of Spain, it became a pedanía in the municipality of Olivenza.
