= Agrela (Santo Tirso) =

- Civil parish
- Location in Portugal
- Coordinates: 41.257°N 8.471°W
- Country: Portugal
- Region: Norte
- Metropolitan area: Porto
- District: Porto
- Municipality: Santo Tirso

Area
  - Total: 6.99 km^{2} (2.70 sq mi)

Population (2011)
  - Total: 1,584
  - Density: 230/km^{2} (590/sq mi)
- Time zone: UTC+00:00 (WET)
  - Summer (DST): UTC+01:00 (WEST)

Agrela is a civil parish in the municipality of Santo Tirso, Portugal. The population in 2011 was 1,584, in an area of 6.99 km^{2}.
