= Treixedo =

Coordinates: 40°26′N 8°06′W

Treixedo is a village (census in 2001 counted 1,104 people) and a former civil parish in the municipality of Santa Comba Dão, Portugal. In 2013, the parish merged into the new parish Treixedo e Nagozela.

Treixedo is an old village (the first documented reference is in a Latin text of 974), surrounded by beautiful valleys and wooded hills.
