= Filipe Ferreira (footballer, born September 1996) =

Portuguese footballer

Personal information
- Full name: Filipe André Martins Freitas Ferreira
- Date of birth: 20 September 1996 (age 30)
- Place of birth: Santo Tirso, Portugal
- Height: 1.92 m (6 ft 4 in)
- Position: Goalkeeper

Youth career
- 2006–2009: Vitória Guimarães
- 2009–2011: Porto
- 2011–2013: Padroense
- 2013–2015: Porto

Senior career*
Years	Team	Apps	(Gls)
2015–2016	Porto B	0	(0)
2016	Nacional	0	(0)
2016	Olhanense	0	(0)
2017	Oliveirense	25	(0)
2017–2019	Braga B	19	(0)
2019–2025	Penafiel	15	(0)

International career^{‡}
2011–2012	Portugal U16	3	(0)
- * Club domestic league appearances and goals as of 4 June 2025 ‡ National team caps and goals as of 1 May 2012

Filipe André Martins Freitas Ferreira (born 20 September 1996) is a Portuguese professional footballer who plays as a goalkeeper.

== Club career ==
On 6 August 2017, Ferreira made his professional debut with Braga B in a 2017–18 LigaPro match against União Madeira.
