= Sátão =

- Municipality
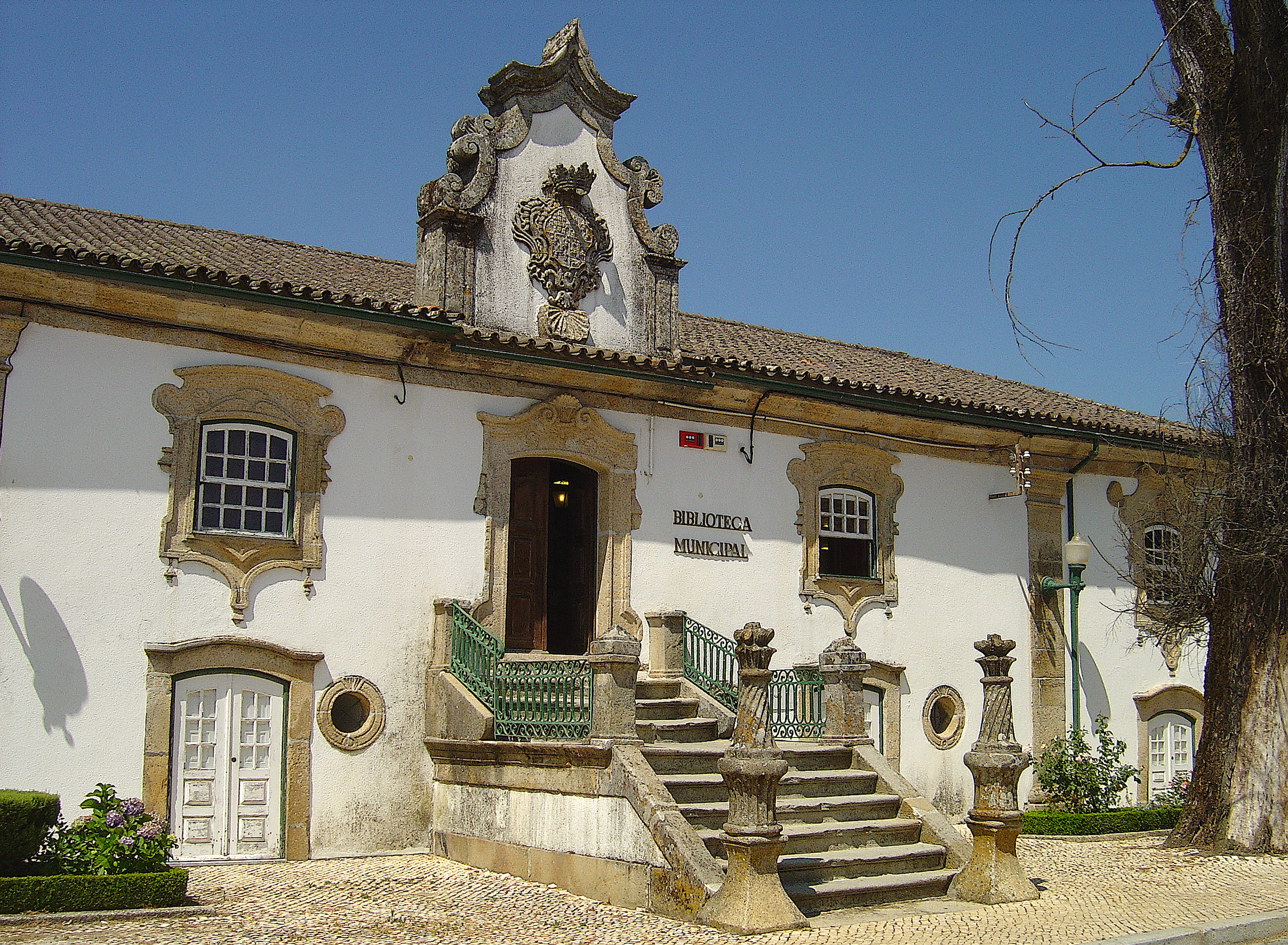
- Municipal library of Sátão

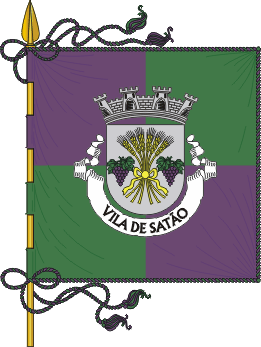
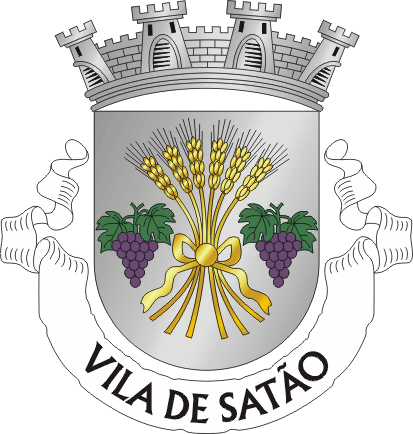
- Flag Coat of arms
- Interactive map of Sátão
- Coordinates: 40°44′N 7°44′W
- Country: Portugal
- Region: Centro
- Intermunic. comm.: Viseu Dão Lafões
- District: Viseu
- Parishes: 9

Government
  - President: Alexandre Vaz (PSD)

Area
  - Total: 201.94 km^{2} (77.97 sq mi)

Population (2011)
  - Total: 12,444
  - Density: 61.622/km^{2} (159.60/sq mi)
- Time zone: UTC+00:00 (WET)
  - Summer (DST): UTC+01:00 (WEST)
- Local holiday: August 20
- Website: www.cm-satao.pt

Sátão (European Portuguese pronunciation: [ˈsatɐ̃w]) is a municipality in the district Viseu in Portugal. The population in 2011 was 12,444, in an area of 201.94 km^{2}.

The present mayor is Paulo Santos, elected by the Social Democratic Party. The municipal holiday is August 20.

== Parishes ==
Administratively, the municipality is divided into 9 civil parishes (freguesias):

- Águas Boas e Forles
- Avelal
- Ferreira de Aves
- Mioma
- Rio de Moinhos
- Romãs, Decermilo e Vila Longa
- São Miguel de Vila Boa
- Sátão
- Silvã de Cima

== Notable people ==
- Tobias Figueiredo (born 1994) a footballer with over 150 club caps, plays for Nottingham Forest
- Pedro Rodrigues a footballer with over 150 club caps
