= Gião (Santa Maria da Feira) =

Former civil parish in Portugal

- Civil parish
- Location in Portugal
- Coordinates: 40.998°N 8.472°W
- Country: Portugal
- Region: Norte
- Metropolitan area: Porto
- District: Aveiro
- Municipality: Santa Maria da Feira
- Disbanded: 2013

Area
  - Total: 3.57 km^{2} (1.38 sq mi)

Population (2001)
  - Total: 1,676
  - Density: 470/km^{2} (1,200/sq mi)
- Time zone: UTC+00:00 (WET)
  - Summer (DST): UTC+01:00 (WEST)

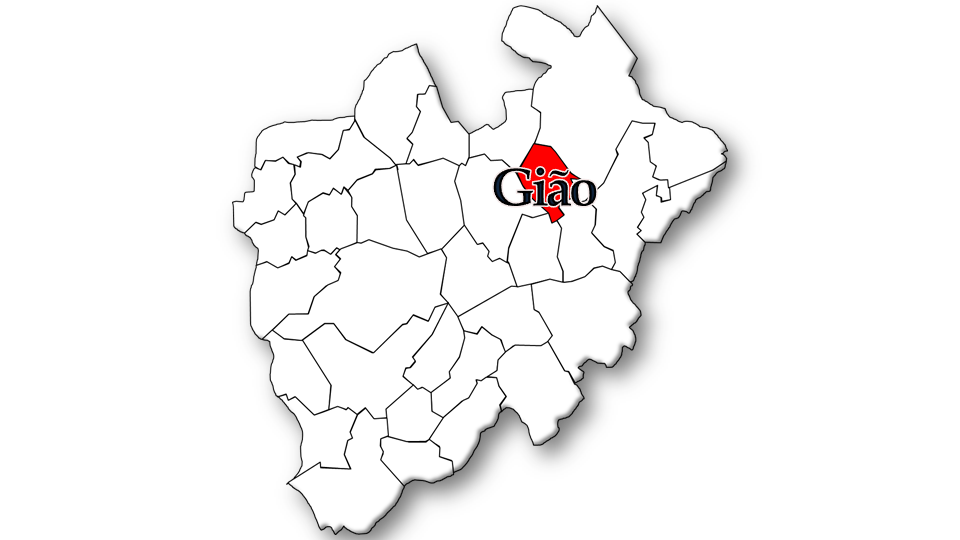
Gião Civil Parish

Gião is a former civil parish in the municipality of Santa Maria da Feira, Portugal. In 2013, the parish merged into the new parish Lobão, Gião, Louredo e Guisande. It has a population of 1,676 inhabitants and a total area of 3.57 km^{2}. Its density was 470/km^{2}.
