= Águas Boas e Forles =

- Civil parish
- Location in Portugal
- Coordinates: 40.856°N 7.626°W
- Country: Portugal
- Region: Centro
- Intermunic. comm.: Viseu Dão Lafões
- District: Viseu
- Municipality: Sátão

Area
  - Total: 15.86 km^{2} (6.12 sq mi)

Population (2011)
  - Total: 237
  - Density: 15/km^{2} (39/sq mi)
- Time zone: UTC+00:00 (WET)
  - Summer (DST): UTC+01:00 (WEST)

Águas Boas e Forles is a civil parish in the municipality of Sátão, Portugal. It was formed in 2013 by the merger of the former parishes Águas Boas and Forles. The population in 2011 was 237, in an area of 15.86 km^{2}.
