= Reguenga =

- Civil parish
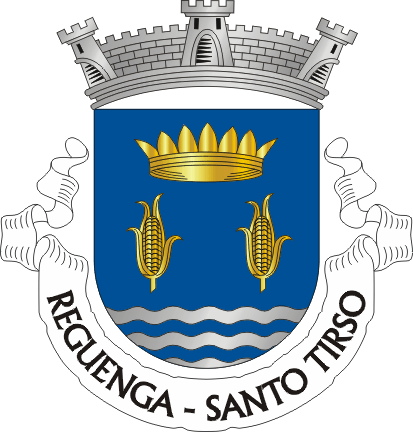
- Coat of arms

- Location in Portugal
- Coordinates: 41.279°N 8.455°W
- Country: Portugal
- Region: Norte
- Metropolitan area: Porto
- District: Porto
- Municipality: Santo Tirso

Area
  - Total: 5.00 km^{2} (1.93 sq mi)

Population (2011)
  - Total: 1,596
  - Density: 320/km^{2} (830/sq mi)
- Time zone: UTC+00:00 (WET)
  - Summer (DST): UTC+01:00 (WEST)

Reguenga is a rural parish located 6 km south of the city of Santo Tirso. The population in 2011 was 1,596, in an area of 5.00 km².
