= Santo Tirso =

- Municipality
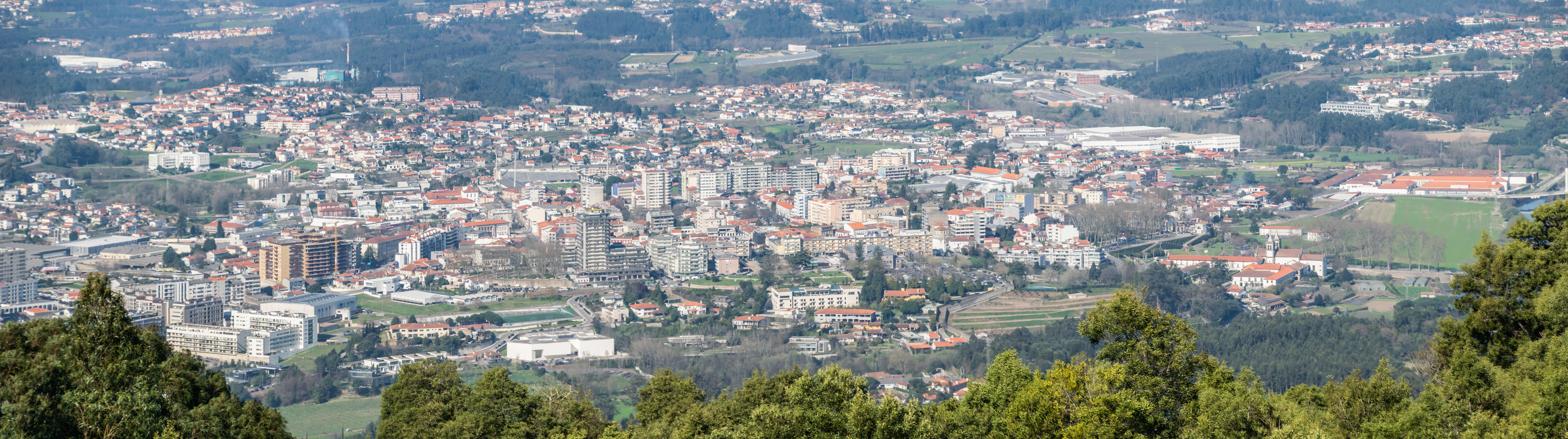
- Panorama of Santo Tirso

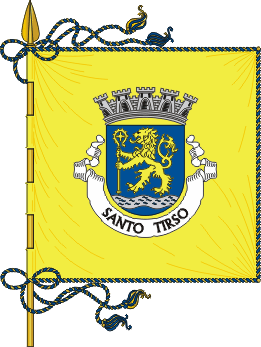
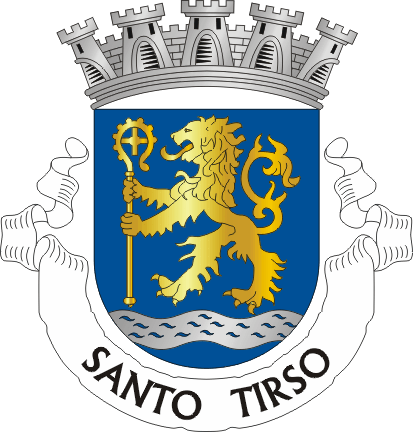
- Flag Coat of arms
- Interactive map of Santo Tirso
- Coordinates: 41°20′N 8°28′W
- Country: Portugal
- Region: Norte
- Metropolitan area: Porto
- District: Porto
- Parishes: 14

Government
  - President: Alberto Costa (Since 2021) (PS)

Area
  - Total: 136.60 km^{2} (52.74 sq mi)

Population (2021)
  - Total: 67,709
  - Density: 495.67/km^{2} (1,283.8/sq mi)
- Time zone: UTC+00:00 (WET)
  - Summer (DST): UTC+01:00 (WEST)
- Website: http://www.cm-stirso.pt

Santo Tirso (Portuguese pronunciation: [ˈsɐ̃tu ˈtiɾsu]) is a city and municipality located in the north of Porto Metropolitan Area, 25 km from central Porto, Portugal. In the region, the Ave Valley, there is a large center of textile industry. The population in 2021 was 67,709, in an area of 136.60 square kilometres (52.74 mi^{2}).

Another important center in the municipality is Aves.

The Santo Tirso Monastery built in 978 is a point of interest.

== History ==
The History of Santo Tirso is tied to its benedictine monastery. The town grew around it and, from 978 until 1834, it was a "couto" – a neutral area that belonged to the clergy. Known initially as Santo Tirso de Riba de Ave, this city has been the capital of a municipality at least since 1833. Its composition changed throughout the years, especially in 1998, when the nearby city of Trofa created its own municipality, taking some of Santo Tirso's towns with it.

Towards the middle of the 19th century, Santo Tirso spearheaded the industrialization of the Ave Valley. One of the first textile factories in the region, the Fábrica de Fiação e Tecidos do Rio Vizela, opened in Vila das Aves, part of its municipality, in 1845. This factory would become the largest of its kind in Portugal, with an area of about nine square kilometres and employing, at one point, over 3.000 people.

== Geography ==
The highest point in the municipality is in the Alto de S. Jorge, in the parish of Refojos, with 527 meters of altitude. The municipality's current perimeter is 69 kilometres (43 miles).

=== Climate ===
Santo Tirso has a Mediterranean climate with warm to hot summers and mild, very wet winters.

Climate data for Santo Tirso, 1951–1980, altitude: 28 m (92 ft)
Month	Jan	Feb	Mar	Apr	May	Jun	Jul	Aug	Sep	Oct	Nov	Dec	Year
Record high °C (°F)	23.0 (73.4)	28.3 (82.9)	28.0 (82.4)	31.6 (88.9)	35.8 (96.4)	37.7 (99.9)	40.5 (104.9)	40.3 (104.5)	38.7 (101.7)	33.5 (92.3)	29.4 (84.9)	23.8 (74.8)	40.5 (104.9)
Mean daily maximum °C (°F)	13.9 (57.0)	14.6 (58.3)	16.6 (61.9)	18.8 (65.8)	21.5 (70.7)	24.7 (76.5)	27.5 (81.5)	27.4 (81.3)	25.5 (77.9)	21.9 (71.4)	16.9 (62.4)	14.2 (57.6)	20.3 (68.5)
Daily mean °C (°F)	9.0 (48.2)	9.6 (49.3)	11.4 (52.5)	13.1 (55.6)	15.8 (60.4)	18.7 (65.7)	20.8 (69.4)	20.4 (68.7)	19.0 (66.2)	15.9 (60.6)	11.4 (52.5)	9.2 (48.6)	14.5 (58.1)
Mean daily minimum °C (°F)	4.1 (39.4)	4.6 (40.3)	6.2 (43.2)	7.4 (45.3)	10.1 (50.2)	12.7 (54.9)	14.1 (57.4)	13.4 (56.1)	12.5 (54.5)	9.9 (49.8)	5.9 (42.6)	4.2 (39.6)	8.8 (47.8)
Average rainfall mm (inches)	193.4 (7.61)	187.6 (7.39)	169.0 (6.65)	96.3 (3.79)	95.6 (3.76)	56.2 (2.21)	22.7 (0.89)	25.0 (0.98)	64.1 (2.52)	128.1 (5.04)	154.8 (6.09)	181.4 (7.14)	1,374.2 (54.07)
Average relative humidity (%)	86	82	77	71	71	71	68	71	76	82	86	87	77
Source: Instituto de Meteorologia

== Parishes ==
Freguesias do concelho de Santo Tirso

Administratively, the municipality is divided into 14 civil parishes (freguesias):

- Agrela
- Água Longa
- Areias, Sequeiró, Lama e Palmeira
- Aves
- Carreira e Refojos de Riba de Ave
- Lamelas e Guimarei
- Monte Córdova
- Rebordões
- Reguenga
- Roriz
- Santo Tirso, Couto (Santa Cristina e São Miguel) e Burgães
- São Tomé de Negrelos
- Vila Nova do Campo
- Vilarinho

== Demographics ==
Historical population

Year	Pop.	±%
1864	22,526	—
1878	23,347	+3.6%
1890	25,610	+9.7%
1900	28,371	+10.8%
1911	33,288	+17.3%
1920	35,234	+5.8%
1930	41,078	+16.6%
1940	51,755	+26.0%

Year	Pop.	±%
1950	63,389	+22.5%
1960	77,130	+21.7%
1970	79,855	+3.5%
1981	93,482	+17.1%
1991	102,593	+9.7%
2001	72,396	−29.4%
2011	71,530	−1.2%
2021	67,709	−5.3%

Source: INE

== Sports ==
Santo Tirso is home of the historic football club Futebol Clube Tirsense and C.D. Aves.

== Notable people ==
- Luís Gonzaga Ferreira da Silva (1923–2013) a Prelate of the Catholic Church & bishop of the Diocese of Lichinga
- Sofia Andrade (born 1988) a Portuguese politician

=== Sport ===
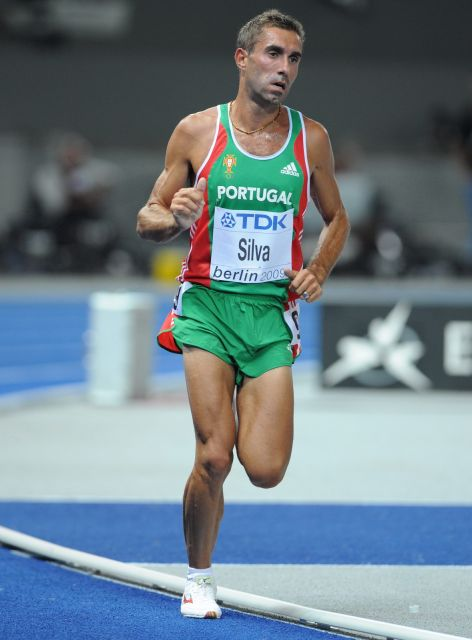
Rui Pedro Silva, 2009

- Rodrigo Almeida (born 2004) a Mozambican racing driver
- Manuel António (born 1946) a former footballer who played as a striker
- Gaspar Azevedo (born 1975) known as Gaspar, a retired footballer with 429 club caps
- Ricardo Carvalho (born 1996) a footballer who plays as a defender
- Chiquinho (born 1995) a footballer who plays as an attacking midfielder
- Alberto Festa (born 1939) a retired footballer with 143 club caps and 19 for Portugal
- Filipe Ferreira (born 1996) a footballer who plays as a goalkeeper
- Grosso (born 1986) a former footballer who played as a midfielder
- Eusébio Guimarães (born 1966) a former footballer
- Quim Machado (born 1966) a former footballer with 320 club caps a current manager
- Sara Moreira (born 1985) a cross country, road, middle & long distance track runner
- Pedro Moutinho (born 1979) a retired footballer with 343 club caps
- Orlando Neto (born 1979), known as Orlando, a former footballer with 386 club caps
- Joaquim Neves (born 1970), a former footballer who played as a defender
- José Pacheco (born 1942) a former cyclist, competed at the 1960 Summer Olympics
- Pedro Queirós (born 1984) a footballer who plays as a right back.
- Ricardo Rocha (born 1978) a retired footballer with 362 club caps and 6 for Portugal
- João Silva (born 1990) is a footballer who plays as a striker
- Rui Pedro Silva (born 1981) a track and field, long distance and cross country athlete, competed at the 2008 & 2012 Summer Olympics
- Sérgio Sousa (born 1986), a former cyclist
- Bruno Tiago (born 1981), a former footballer who played as a midfielder
- Romeu Torres (born 1986) a footballer who plays as a forward
- José Vilaça (born 1985) a footballer who plays as a centre back
- Vitinha (born 2000) a footballer who plays as a midfielder
