= Metropolitan areas in Portugal =

The metropolitan area (Portuguese: área metropolitana) is a type of administrative division in Portugal. Since the 2013 local government reform, there are two metropolitan areas: Lisbon and Porto. The metropolitan areas of Lisbon and Porto were created in 1991. A law passed in 2003 supported the creation of more metropolitan areas, under the conditions that they consisted of at least nine municipalities (concelhos) and had at least 350,000 inhabitants. Several metropolitan areas were created under this law (Algarve, Aveiro, Coimbra, Minho and Viseu), but a law passed in 2008 abolished these, converting them into intermunicipal communities, whose territories are (roughly) based on the NUTS III statistical regions.

The branches of administration of the metropolitan area are the metropolitan council, the metropolitan executive committee and the strategic board for metropolitan development. The metropolitan council is composed of the presidents of the municipal chambers of the municipalities.

== List ==
The legal status of metropolitan area is held only by two:

- Lisbon metropolitan area (Área Metropolitana de Lisboa)
- Porto metropolitan area (Área Metropolitana do Porto)

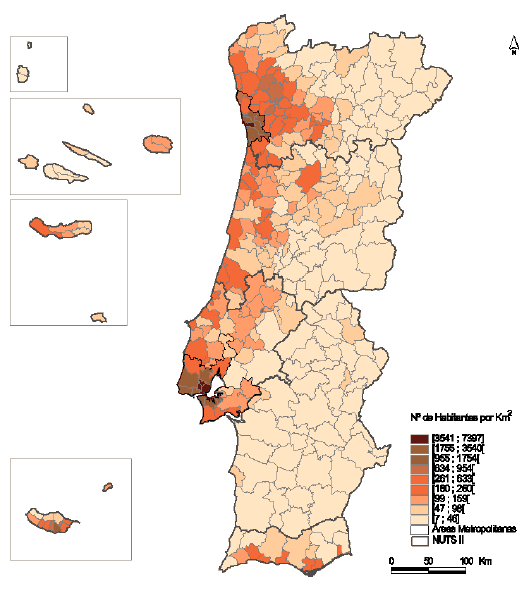
A map of Portugal showing the population density (number of inhabitants / km^{2}) by municipality

The OECD and Eurostat have identified the following metropolitan areas ("Functional Urban Areas") based on commuting patterns.

Rank	City name	FUA population (2015)	Region
1	Lisbon	2,925,000	Lisbon
2	Porto	1,265,000	Norte
3	Coimbra	271,000	Centro
4	Braga	250,000	Norte
5	Funchal	213,000	Madeira
6	Guimarães	179,000	Norte
7	Aveiro	139,000	Centro
8	Faro	122,000	Algarve
9	Ponta Delgada	119,000	Azores
10	Viseu	111,000	Centro
