= Economy of Póvoa de Varzim =

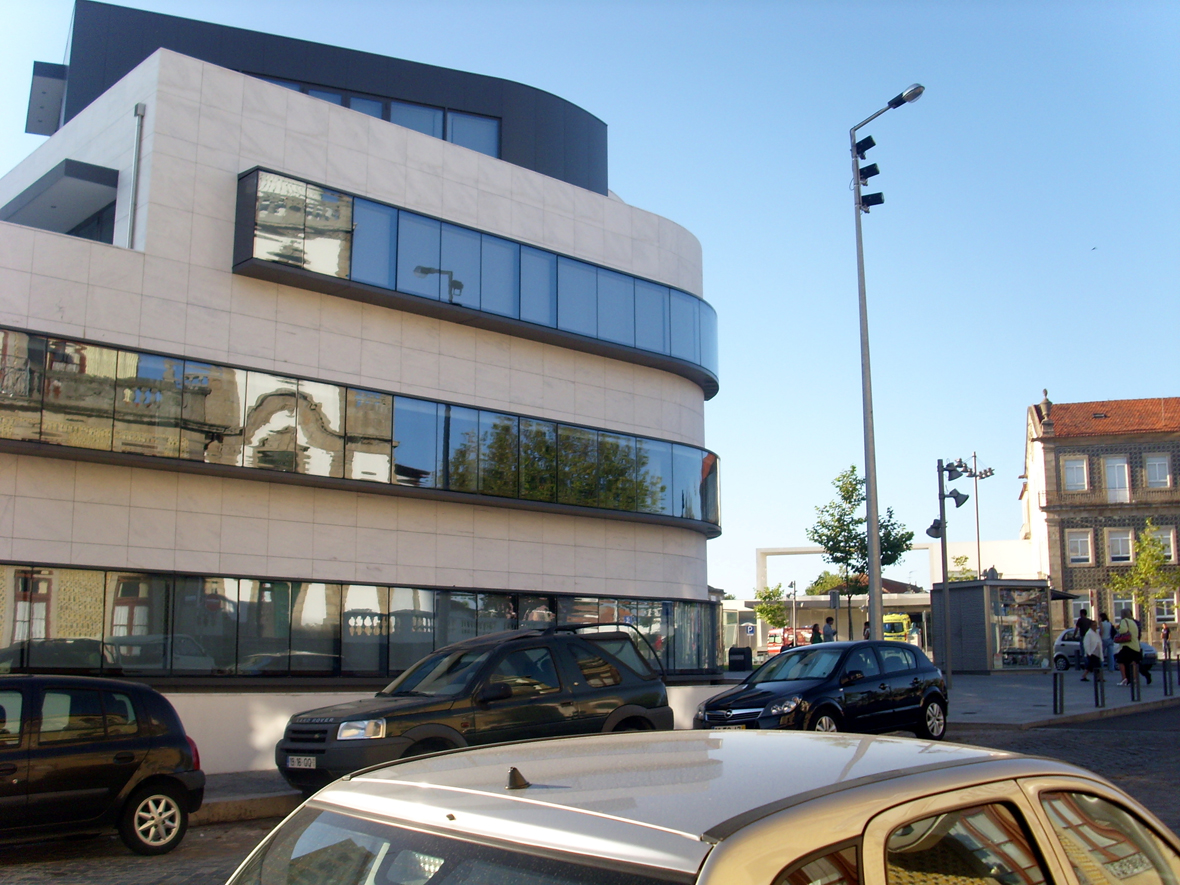
Headquarters of the CA bank of Póvoa de Varzim, Vila do Conde, and Esposende. A co-operative retail bank.

The economy of Póvoa de Varzim in Portugal is driven by tourism (namely gambling, hotels and restaurants), manufacturing, construction, fishing, and agro-business. During the 2001 census, 1770 companies are headquartered in Póvoa de Varzim, of which 2.82% were of the primary sector, 33.73% of the secondary and 63.45% of the tertiary. Despite its weight in Greater Porto international trade is weak, in 2004 it represented 1.1% of departures and 0.9% of arrivals, its coverage rate of arrivals against departures suppressed the 100% mark. The activity rate had grown from 48% to 51.1% from 1991 to 2001, but there were 3353 citizens unemployed in June 2006.

== Fish industry ==
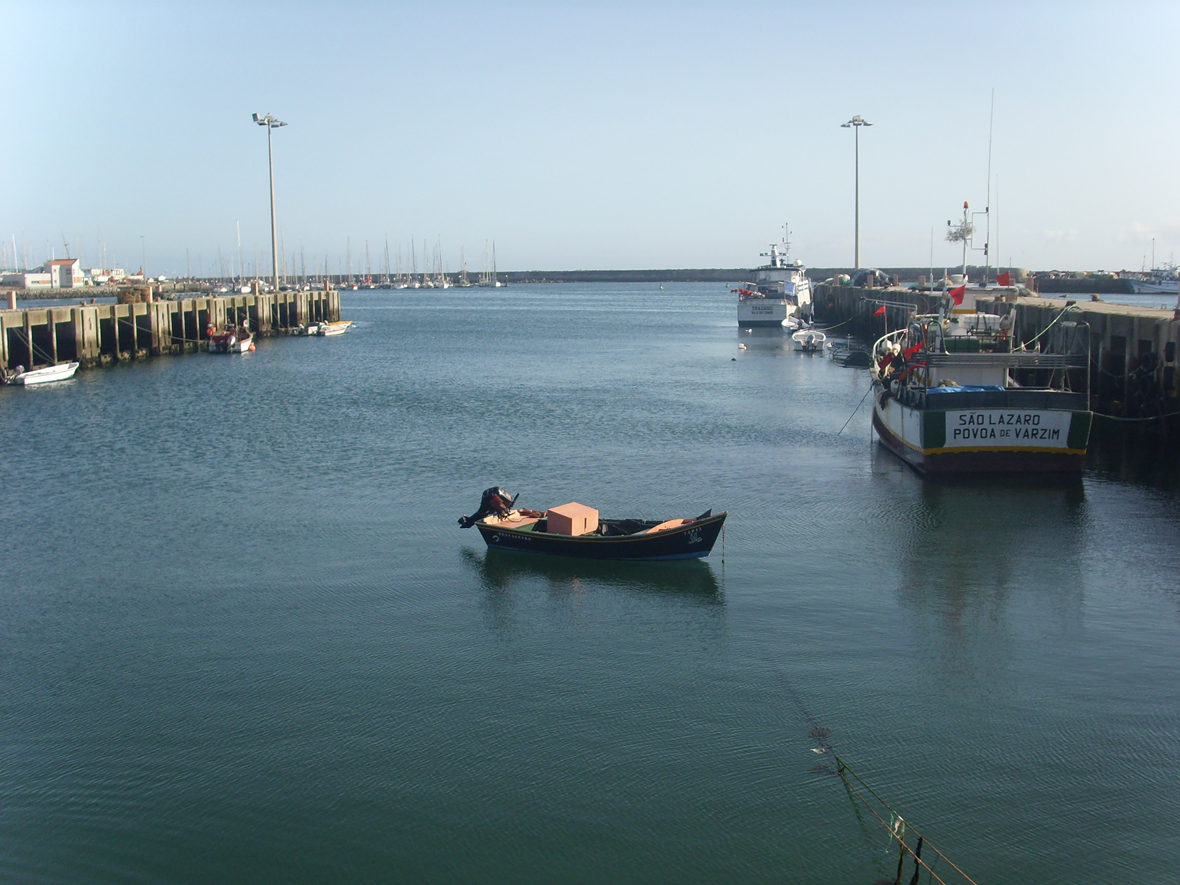
Fishing vessels in the Port of Póvoa de Varzim.

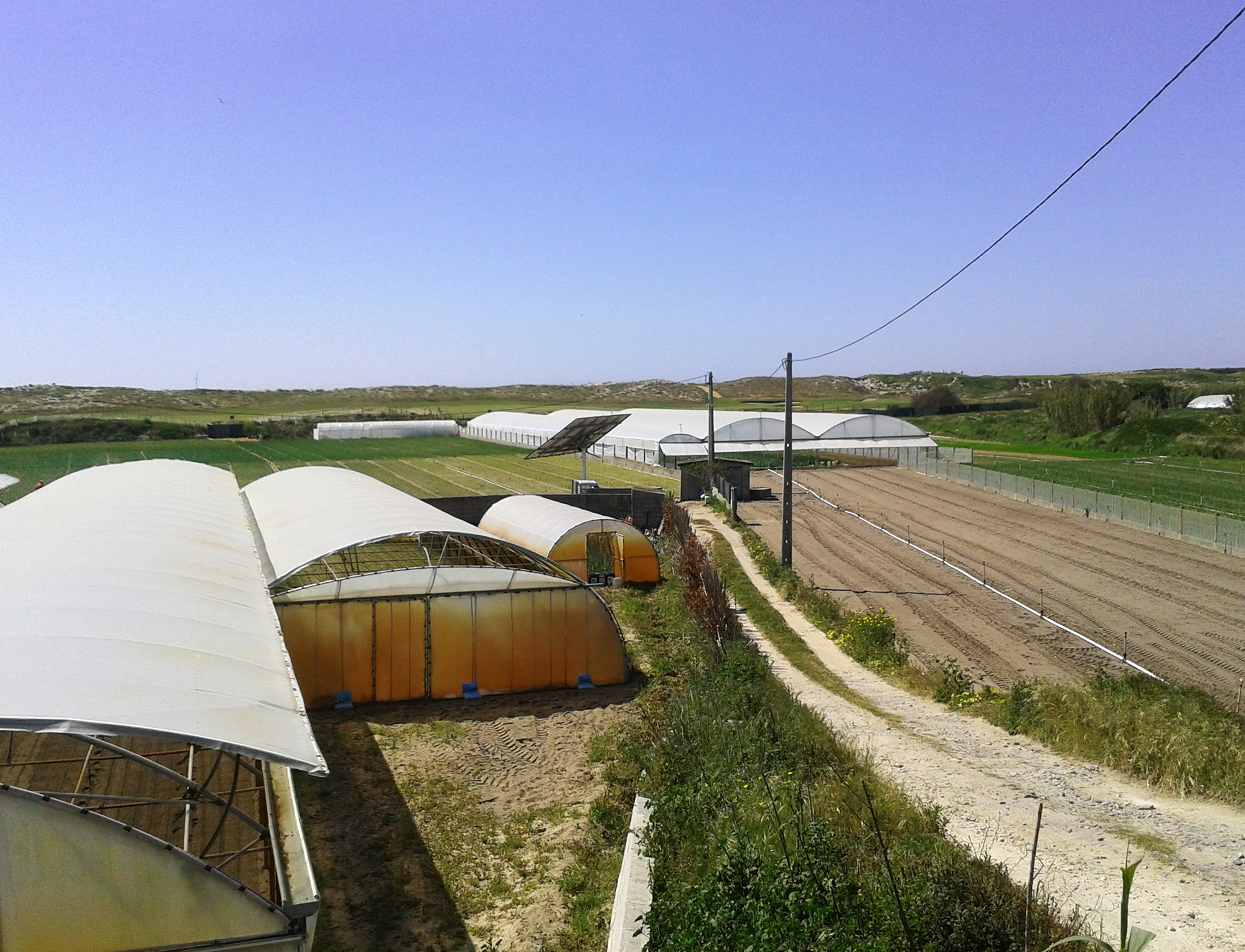
A modern sand dune farm in Rio Alto.

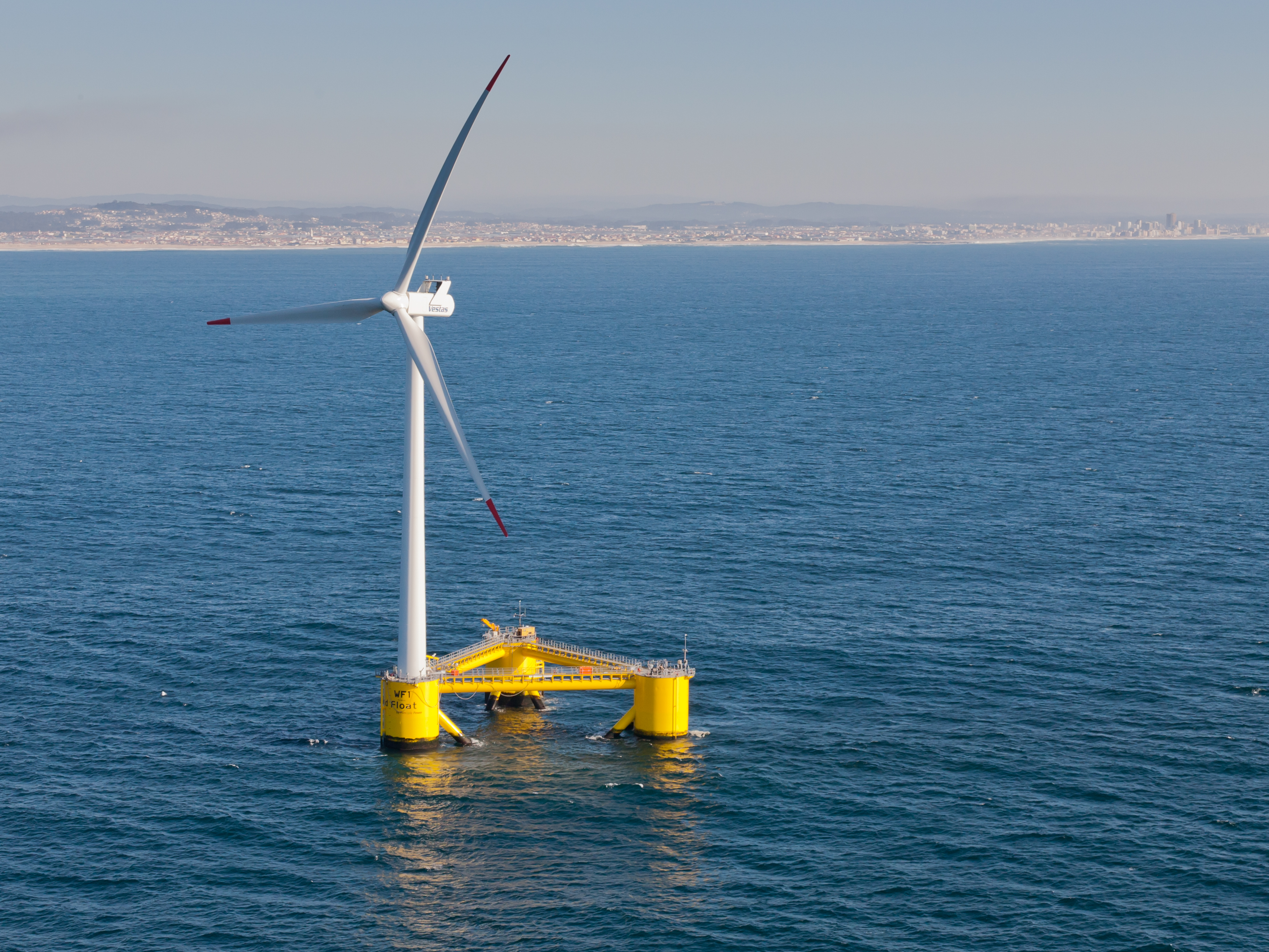
An offshore floating wind turbine.

The fact that it is a seaside city has shaped Póvoa de Varzim's economy: the fishing industry, from the fishing vessels that put in each day to the canning industry and to the city's fish market, beach agriculture, seaweed-gathering for fertilizing fields, and tourism are the result of its geography. Tourism and the related industries are more relevant in Póvoa's economy these days, as fisheries have lost importance. Nevertheless, the mean value of fish landed in 2004, in its seaport, was almost three times that of Matosinhos seaport and significantly higher in the average vessels' capacity. Its fishing productivity is also comparatively higher than the national average. A Poveira is a traditional Povoan canning factory and most of its production, 80 to 85%, is exported and deals with high-end quality brands, such as Minerva, in canned sardines, mackerel and codfish, for MDC markets such as Japan, the United States, the United Kingdom, France, Italy, Scandinavia, Austria, Singapore and Australia and aims to triple the production to meet the demand. Other export market brands include: Poveira, D'Henry IV, and Ala-Arriba.

== Farming and dairy industry ==
Póvoa de Varzim is part of the ancient Vinho Verde winemaking region. In the coast, the masseira farm fields were developed. This technique increases agricultural yields by using large, rectangular depressions dug into sand dunes, with the spoil piled up into banks surrounding the depression. Grapes are cultivated on the banks to the south, east and west, and trees and reeds on the northern slope act as a windbreak against the prevailing northern wind. Garden crops are grown in the central depression. Production is still specialized in horticultural goods, but most of the masseiras were substituted by greenhouses and a significant share of the production is exported to other Western European markets. The inland valley region is committed to milk production and the Agros corporation headquarters of Lactogal, the largest dairy products and milk producer company in the Iberian Peninsula, is located in Espaço Agros and has several departments such as exhibition park and laboratories, and the largest agricultural project in northern Portugal.

== Construction and other industries ==
Monte Adriano, the seventh largest construction company in Portugal, and the joint venture between the Royal Lankhorst Euronete and Quintas & Quintas, producer of deepwater mooring systems, are two large companies based in the city. The manufacturing industry is an important employer, mostly in the textile industry that has low productivity and income. These industries are located out of the city in Beiriz, Balasar, and Rates. Other employers include the blanket handicraft industry of Terroso and Laundos, and the wood industries of Rates. One of the initiatives of the municipality is the Parque Industrial de Laundos (Industrial Park of Laundos), in the city's outskirts, next to the A28 Motorway.

== Renewable energy industry ==
Póvoa de Varzim has been noted internationally for its Renewable energy industry. The world's first commercial wave farm was located in its coast, at the Aguçadora Wave Park. The wave farm used three Pelamis P-750 machines with a capacity of 2.25 megawatts, enough to meet the average electricity demand of more than 1,500 Portuguese households. Energy self-sustainability was foreseen with the expansion of the wave park to 28 machines capable to produce 24 mW, supplying 250 thousand inhabitants. The project failed and was replaced by the floating wind turbine project, a new prototype on offshore wind farms, from a distinct company, that is still operating. Energie, a company headquartered in Póvoa de Varzim, developed a thermodynamic solar system combining solar energy and a heat pump to generate energy even when it is night or overcast; the success of this technology internationally led the company to open in a large factory, that started operating in 2007.

== Local economy ==
- civil construction: buildings, motorways
- Construction materials
- private hospitals
- ERP software
- Gambling, hotels and restaurants
- rope making
- textile industry / handicraft industry
- lifts industry (headquarters) - Póvoa de Varzim/Vila do Conde/Esposende
- Paper industry
- Soft drinks
- milk, dairy food (milk production; headquarters) - Póvoa de Varzim/Vila do Conde/Esposende
- food processing
- wine production
- canning industry; fresh fish
- horticulture

== See also ==
- Transportation in Póvoa de Varzim
- Fairs of Póvoa de Varzim
