= Visionarium =

Visionarium may refer to:

- Visionarium (Portugal), a science museum in Portugal
- Le Visionarium, European counterpart of The Timekeeper, a 1992 Circle-Vision 360° film
