= García Rodrígues =

García Rodrígues da Fonseca
- Lord
- Born: 10th-century Iberian Peninsula
- Died: 11th-century Iberian Peninsula
- Father: Rodrigo Garcia

García Rodrígues da Fonseca (born 10th-century) was a Galician nobleman, Lord of Honra de Fonseca.

He was the grandson of Garcia Moniz, o Gasco. His wife was Dordia Ramírez.

García Rodrígues was appointed Lord of Couto de Leomil by Henry, Count of Portugal in 1102.
