= Sanfins =

Sanfins may refer to:

== Places ==
=== Portugal ===
- Sanfins (Chaves), a civil parish in Chaves Municipality, Portugal;
- Sanfins (Santa Maria da Feira), a civil parish in the municipality of Santa Maria da Feira;
- Sanfins (Valença), a civil parish in the municipality of Valença;
- Sanfins (Valpaços), a civil parish in Valpaços Municipality;
- Sanfins de Ferreira, a civil parish in the municipality of Paços de Ferreira;
- Sanfins do Douro, a civil parish in Alijó Municipality;
- Sanfins (Cinfães), a civil parish in Cinfães Municipality.
