= Rúben Fonseca =

Portuguese footballer

Personal information
- Full name: Rúben Miguel Valente Fonseca
- Date of birth: 24 February 2000 (age 26)
- Place of birth: Sanfins, Portugal
- Height: 1.88 m (6 ft 2 in)
- Position: Forward

Team information
- Current team: Ovarense
- Number: 9

Youth career
- 2010–2011: Sanfins
- 2011–2012: Feirense
- 2012–2016: Benfica
- 2016–2018: Feirense
- 2018–2019: Tondela

Senior career*
Years	Team	Apps	(Gls)
2019–2023	Tondela	46	(3)
2021	→ Salgueiros (loan)	12	(2)
2022	→ Braga B (loan)	9	(1)
2023–2024	Hermannstadt	28	(1)
2024–2025	Sanjoanense	22	(9)
2025–2026	Paredes	24	(1)
2026–	Ovarense	4	(3)

International career
2019	Portugal U19	2	(0)
- * Club domestic league appearances and goals as of 13 September 2026

Rúben Miguel Valente Fonseca (born 24 February 2000) is a Portuguese professional footballer who plays as a forward for Campeonato de Portugal club Ovarense.

== Club career ==
Born in Sanfins (Santa Maria da Feira), Fonseca played youth football for three clubs, including S.L. Benfica from ages 12 to 16. On 23 May 2019, after leading all scorers in the junior championship with 20 goals, the 19-year-old signed his first professional contract with C.D. Tondela.

Fonseca made his competitive debut with the first team on 3 August 2019, coming on as a second-half substitute in a 1–0 away loss against F.C. Penafiel in the second round of the Taça da Liga. He first appeared in the Primeira Liga the following 5 January, featuring 17 minutes in the 1–1 home draw with Gil Vicente FC.

On 5 January 2021, Fonseca was loaned to third division club S.C. Salgueiros until the end of the season. One year later, also on loan, he joined S.C. Braga B of the same league.

Fonseca scored his first second-tier goal on 19 August 2022, closing the 1–1 home draw with S.C. Covilhã. In July 2023, FC Hermannstadt of the Romanian Liga I announced the signing of the player as a free agent.

Fonseca subsequently returned to Portugal, representing A.D. Sanjoanense and U.S.C. Paredes in the Liga 3.

== Honours ==
Tondela

- Supertaça Cândido de Oliveira runner-up: 2022
