= Ermígio Viegas I of Ribadouro =

Portuguese nobleman (?-1070)

Ermigio Viegas I of Ribadouro
- Lord of Ribadouro
- Tenure: c.1044 - c.1070
- Predecessor: Egas Moniz I de Ribadouro
- Successor: Monio Ermiges I
- Died: before 1070
- Noble family: House of Ribadouro
- Spouse: Unisco Pais
- Issue: Monio Ermiges I de Ribadouro Egas Ermiges de Ribadouro Vivili Ermiges de Ribadouro Emiso Ermiges de Ribadouro Onega Ermiges de Ribadouro Ausenda Ermiges
- Father: Egas Moniz I de Ribadouro
- Mother: Toda Ermiges da Maia

Ermigio Viegas I of Ribadouro (d. before 1070), called O Gasco (The Gascon) was a medieval knight of the County of Portucale, feudal lord of Ribadouro, and also governor of Lamego. He was the grandfather of the famous Egas Moniz, the Tutor.

== Biography ==
Ermígio was the firstborn son of Egas Moniz I of Ribadouro and his wife, Toda Ermiges da Maia. He inherited the epithet O Gasco from his father, which was common in the family.

Documented in 1043 and 1047, in the latter year he is said to have presided over a judgment council, related to the government and administration of “lands” on the left bank of the Douro River, presided over by his uncle, Garcia Moniz de Ribadouro. He owned several properties on both sides of the Douro River, from Baião and Resende to Penafiel and Arouca. He is mentioned to have administered, as lieutenant, several localities in Ribadouro after 1060.

Ermígio is believed to have founded, with his brother, Monio Viegas , the Monastery of Pendorada, of which they were the first patrons, a fact that is proven by a document from 1123 which refers to the patronage of the monastery belonging to the descendants of Monio Viegas and Ermigio Viegas.

He appears not to have reached the year 1070.

== Marriage and offspring ==
Ermígio Viegas married, on an unknown date, Unisco Pais, with whom he had:

- Monio Ermiges I de Ribadouro, heir to the headship of the family and the government of Ribadouro
- Egas Ermiges de Ribadouro
- Vivili Ermiges de Ribadouro, married to Paio
- Emiso Ermiges de Ribadouro
- Onega Ermiges de Ribadouro
- Ausenda Ermiges married Diogo Trutesendes.
