= Moninho Viegas, o Gasco =

Medieval Knight (950–1022)

Moninho Viegas
- Lord of Ribadouro
- Tenure: ?-1022
- Successor: Egas Moniz I de Ribadouro
- Full name: Monio Viegas de Ribadouro
- Other names: Monio Viegas, o Gasco
- Born: c. 950
- Died: 1022; Vila Boa do Bispo, Marco de Canaveses, Porto, Portugal
- Buried: Mosteiro de Vila Boa do Bispo, Vila Boa do Bispo, Marco de Canaveses, Porto, Portugal
- Noble family: House of Ribadouro
- Issue: Egas Moniz I de Ribadouro Garcia Moniz, o Gasco; Gomes Moniz; Godo Moniz Fromarico Moniz
- Father: Egas (Moniz?)

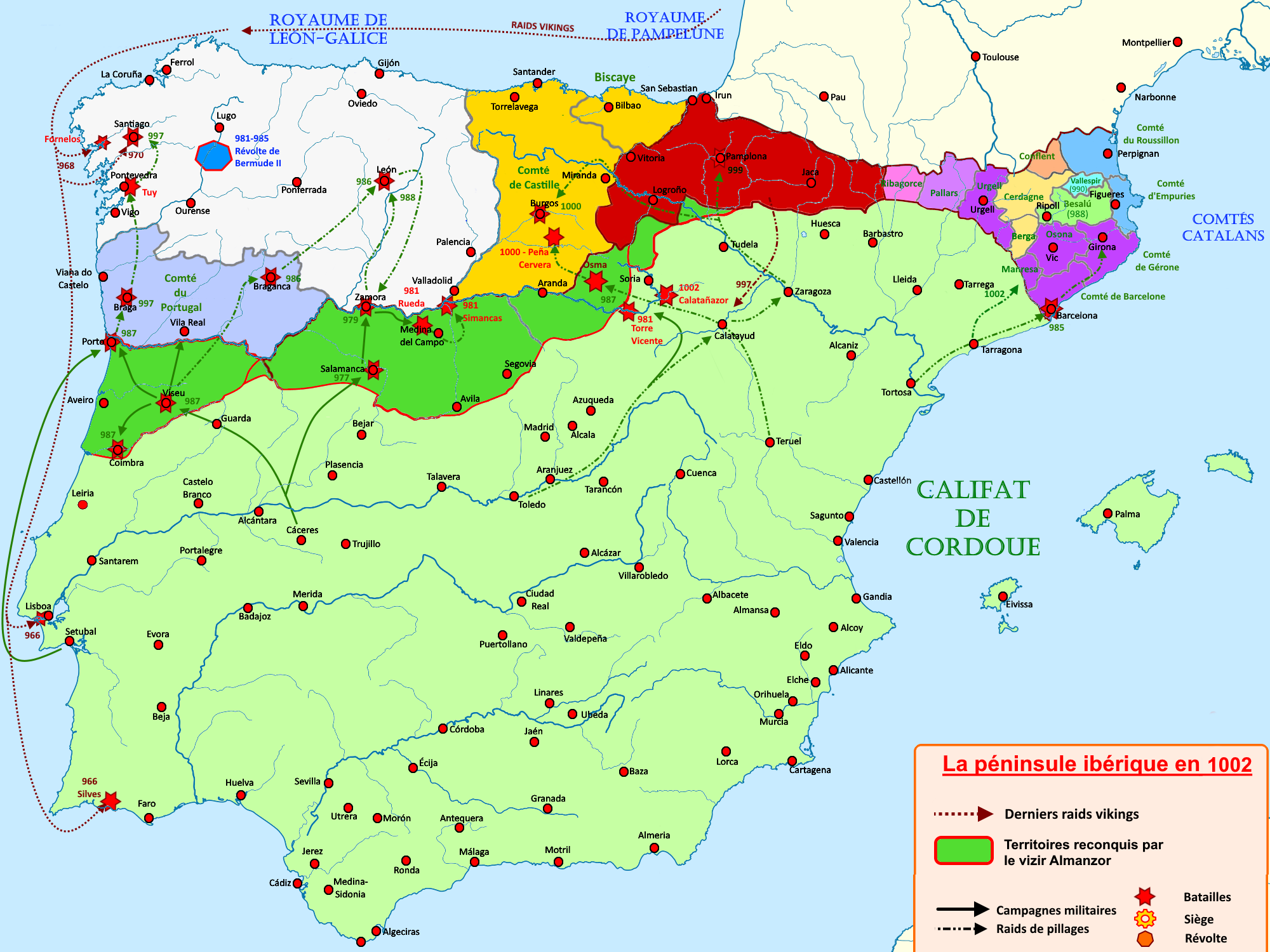
Iberian Peninsula between 961 and 1002 showing Almanzor's campaigns

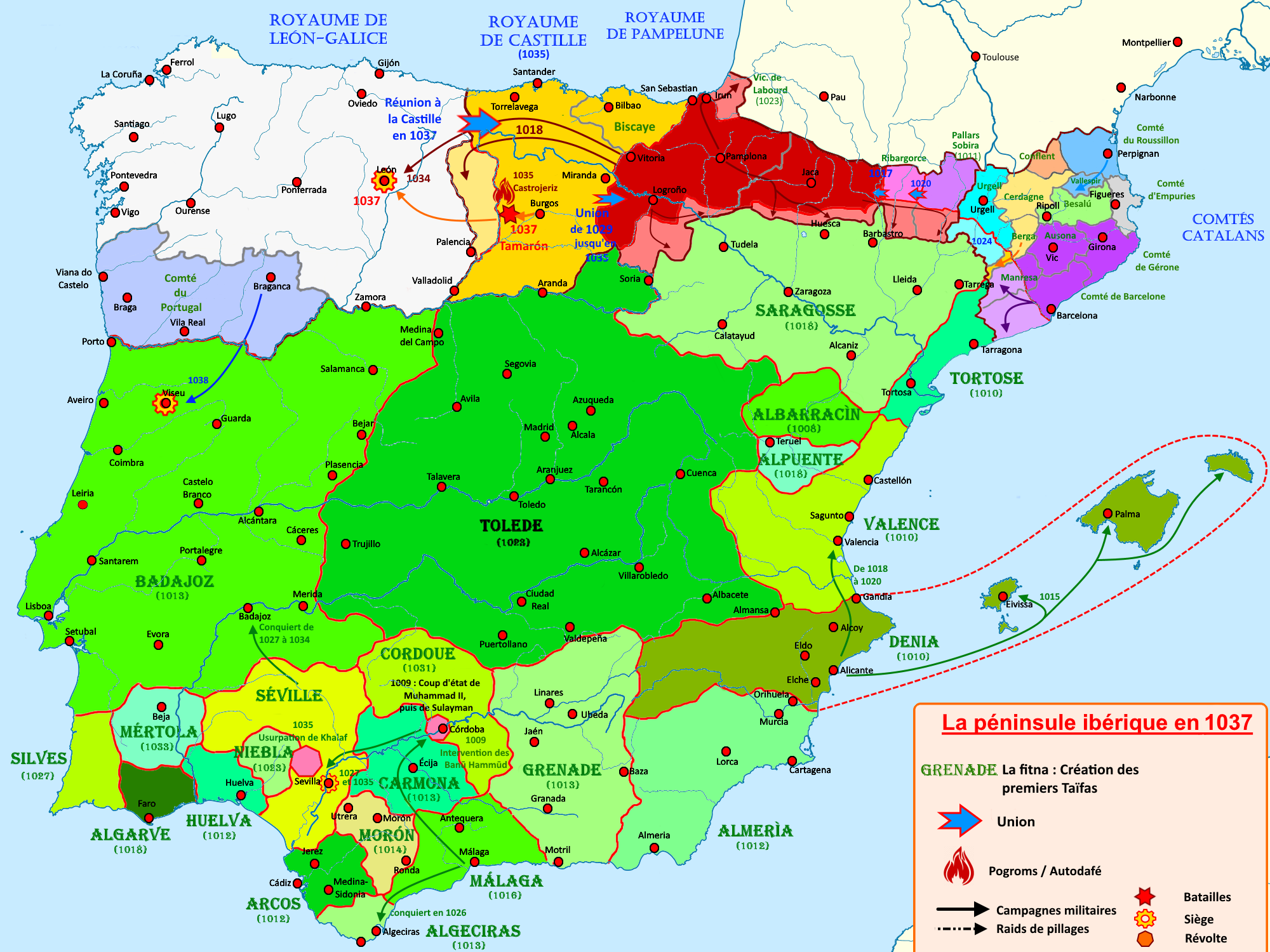
Iberian Peninsula between 1002 and 1037

Moninho Viegas, called the Gascon (o Gasco) or Monio (sometimes spelled Munio) Viegas (c. 950–1022, Vila Boa do Bispo) was a Portuguese nobleman of the 10th and 11th centuries. This Gascon was one of the first, with the help of his brothers, to fight the Moors of Almanzor in Portugal, taking part in the reconquest of western Ribadouro. Moninho Viegas was the founder of Monastery of Villa-Boas.

== Family origins ==
Old accounts tell that in 999, in a year of change in the kingdom of León, when Bermudo II died and Count Mendo Gonçalves of Portugal became regent of the young Afonso V of León, a landing of Christians took place at the mouth of the Douro, commanded by Monio Viegas, the supposed founder of the Ribaduriense (or Gascan) lineage, who was said to have originated in Gascony. This information may be credible, but in a donation that Garcia Moniz made in 1068 to the King of Galicia, it refers to goods that he had inherited from his grandparents, so that these, the supposed parents of the “founder from Gascony” already had control in Ribadouro, and so Monio did not conquer such control, but inherited it, and therefore could not come from Gascony, as he was a native of Portugal, probably from a Portuguese place called Gasconha (or Casconha in the current municipality of Paredes).

== Biography ==
In reality, his patronymic, Viegas, already points to a Portuguese paternity, since he would be the son of D. Egas (probably Moniz, given the frequency of the name in the family) and D. Dordia, and there may be the hypothesis (of which there are few certainties) that he is even the grandson of Monio Guterres and Elvira Arias, and thus nephew of Gonçalo Moniz, Count of Coimbra.

It is known that he owned property in the current municipalities of Marco de Canaveses, Baião, Cinfães, Castelo de Paiva, Penafiel and Arouca, where it is known that he had authority as vicar of the King of León.

=== Founding of monasteries ===
Shortly before 1008 he donated the town of Travanca to his son Garcia, without the obligation to share it with his brother Egas, but with the obligation to build a monastery, which he founded in that year of 1008.

His son was not the only one to found a monastery, as he founded, together with his brother the future bishop of Porto D. Sisnando, the Monastery of Vila Boa do Bispo around 1010. Near the monastery he defeated a Muslim host, by means of a promise made during the battle of Valboa, where he captured the castle of Monte de Arados. The territory where the Monastery was located had favorable conditions for monastic life, since it was rugged and therefore rarely visited by pilgrims and other travelers. It had recently been cleared and repopulated. In the following centuries, the Monastery and the surrounding lands would be linked to several descendants of Monio, with properties in Vila Boa do Bispo or in the territory of the current parish. There is also news of several members of the family who donated assets to this monastery.

=== Death and posterity ===
It is unknown how he died, and nothing rules out that he died in battle. The most likely date of his death is 1022, since a tomb was discovered in the monastery he founded with an inscription identifying him and indicating that year as the date of his death.

== Marriage and descendants ==
The name of his wife is unknown, but lineageists point to Velida Trutesendes, something that would be physically impossible, since she is only attested from the end of the 11th century. Monio would have had the following descendants:

- Egas Moniz de Ribadouro, lord of Ribadouro and married to Toda Ermiges, daughter of Ermígio Aboazar and Vivili Turtezendes.
- Garcia Moniz de Ribadouro, founder of the Monastery of Travanca .
- Gomes Moniz de Ribadouro
- Godo Moniz of Ribadouro
- Fromarico Moniz de Ribadouro

== See also ==
- Egas Moniz I de Ribadouro
- Garcia Moniz, o Gasco
