= NorteShopping =

Shopping centre in Senhora da Hora, near Porto, Portugal

Coordinates: 41°10′52.10238″N 8°39′15.52694″W

- Location: Matosinhos, Portugal
- Opened: October 21, 1998; 28 years ago
- Manager: Sonae Sierra
- Owner: Sonae Sierra
- Num. of stores: c. 250
- Floors: 2
- Website: https://www.norteshopping.pt/

NorteShopping is a shopping mall located in Senhora da Hora, Matosinhos, Portugal, the largest in northern Portugal by gross leasable area. It is owned in equal parts by Fundo Sierra and Nuveen.

It is located between the urban area of Senhora da Hora and Zona Industrial do Porto, at Rua Sara Afonso, near the AEP roundabout, in the crossing between the A28 highway with EN12 (Circunvalação). Since its launch in 1998, it uses a compass as its logo.

== Theme ==
NorteShopping selected a steam engine (originally from Soure, 1981) in homage to the Industrial Revolution of the nineteenth century.

The choice of this theme evoked the former Efanor factory, one of the most importante textile factories that took an active role in Portugal's industrial development, and that of Senhora da Hora. The terrain built for the shopping mall was located in the former factory.

At one of NorteShopping's plazas, a steam machine recovered from the former Paleão factory was installed. The machine dates back to the late eighteenth century, very rare and directly related with the transformation of steam energy to mechanic energy.

== History ==
In an initial phase, adjacent to the opening of the first Continente hypermarket in December 1985, it was known as Centro Comercial Continente de Matosinhos. The complex was built on terrain that was formerly owned by the local diocesis.

Work on the new mall to be built adjacent to the extant Continente complex began on 2 October 1996 and was open to the public on 21 October 1998, becoming northern Portugal's largest mall. José Quintela da Fonseca was its architect.

At opening date, the mall had a total area of 75 400 m², 286 stores, 4 800 free parking slots, 28 escalators, 2 conveyor belts, 6 elevators, 17 forklifts and an installed electric power of 16 780 KVA.

On the early hours of 12 January 2012, it suffered its first robbery. A team of seven tried to steal watches at Boutique dos Relógios Plus at around 5:15 am.

== Expansion ==
Bragashopping proposed the municipality of Matosinhos a new plot of land to expand its complex, being evaluated on 17 April 2015. The agreement also envisioned the expansion of the local cemetery. In September 2016, the expansion was given the go ahead for early 2017.

In 2019, following the demolition of its bowling compound, NorteShopping suffered several changes, through the creation of new stores and expansion of extant tenants. On 3 September, it opened The CookBook, a "trendy" food court. The cinemas were also relocated.

On 21 October 2019, it opened its refurbished Inditex stores, namely Bershka, Pull&Bear, Stradivarius and Zara. The Zara store was expanded and added an online shopping point using QR codes or specific PINs for each order.

Galleria opened on 21 October 2020, in the location of the former cinemas, this area focuses more on premium fashion brands.
