= Monastery of Saint Saviour of Palme =

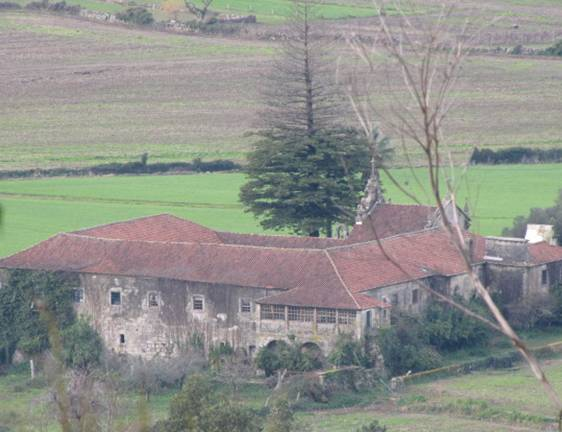

Mosteiro de S. Salvador de Palme

The Monastery was located about 12 km from Barcelos (Portugal), in the small village of Aldreu, south of the Neiva River. It was founded around 1025, it was closed due to the extinction of religious orders enacted in 1834. Benedictine, having passed to the Moniz Family, through the hands of HE the Bishop D. António Bernardo Moniz and his brother, the General and Barão de Palme José Maria da Fonseca Moniz. Currently, one of the descendants and co-owner of the Monastery and the property resides there(Moniz). Of Romanesque origin and construction (1st period), the main chapel of its Gothic church (14th century - 2nd period) and the cloisters are preserved, and the façade was altered in the 19th century.
