= Monio Ermiges =

Portuguese nobleman (1050 - 1107)

- Lord of Ribadouro
- Tenure: 1050 - 1107
- Predecessor: Ermígio Viegas I of Ribadouro
- Successor: Egas Moniz o Aio
- Died: 1107
- Noble family: House of Ribadouro
- Spouse: Ouroana
- Issue: Egas Moniz o Aio D. Mem Moniz de Riba Douro
- Father: Ermígio Viegas I of Ribadouro
- Mother: Unisco Pais

Monio Ermiges (1050 - 1107) was a nobleman of the County of Portucale and holder of the feudal lordship of Ribadouro, a Portuguese parish in the municipality of Baião.

== Family ==
He was the son of Ermigio Viegas (1020 -?), lord of Ribadouro, and Unisco Pais (1030 -?). He married Ouroana (1060 -?), with whom he had:

1. Egas Moniz, the Tutor (1080 - 1146) married twice, first to Dórdia Pais Azevedo and second to Teresa Afonso Nunes de Celanova.
2. D. Mem Moniz de Riba Douro (1075 - 1154) married twice, first to D. Gontinha Mendes and second to Cristina Gonçalves das Astúrias.
