= Espargo =

Former civil parish in Portugal

- Civil parish
- Location in Portugal
- Coordinates: 40.923°N 8.576°W
- Country: Portugal
- Region: Norte
- Metropolitan area: Porto
- District: Aveiro
- Municipality: Santa Maria da Feira
- Disbanded: 2013

Area
  - Total: 5.70 km^{2} (2.20 sq mi)

Population (2001)
  - Total: 1,309
  - Density: 230/km^{2} (595/sq mi)
- Time zone: UTC+00:00 (WET)
  - Summer (DST): UTC+01:00 (WEST)

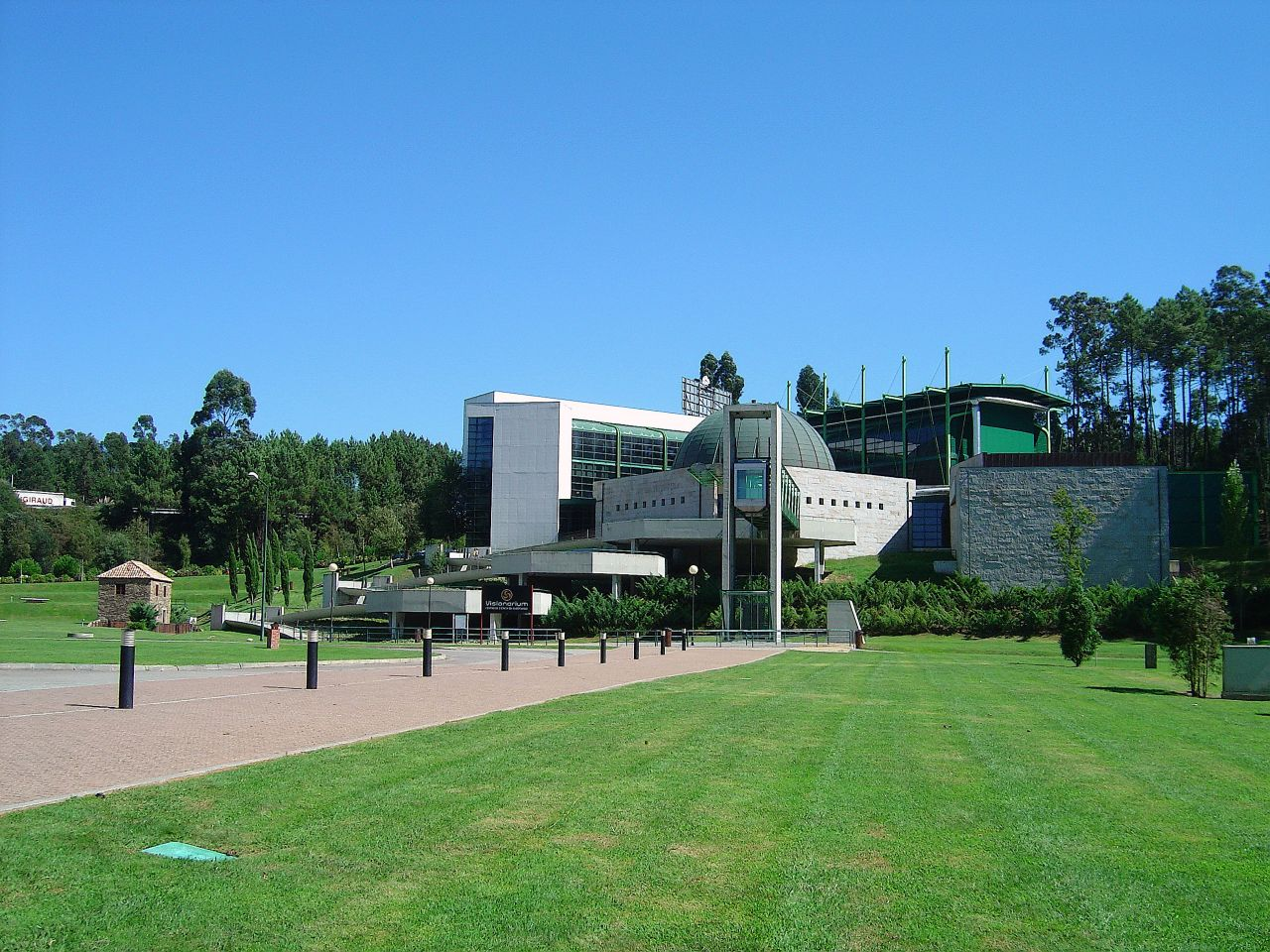
The Visionarium, Europarque Science Center, is one of the main attractions in Espargo

Espargo is a former civil parish in the municipality of Santa Maria da Feira, Portugal. In 2013, the parish merged into the new parish Santa Maria da Feira, Travanca, Sanfins e Espargo. It has a population of 1,309 inhabitants and a total area of 5.70 km^{2}.

== Attractions ==
In the parish is located one of the largest and most modern congress centres in the country, the Europarque, and a science centre, the Visionarium.
