= Vila Boa do Bispo =

- Civil parish
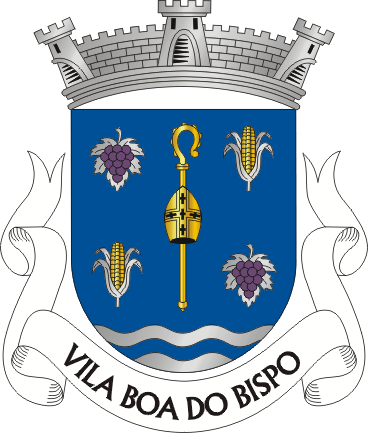
- Coat of arms

- Location in Portugal
- Coordinates: 41.127°N 8.213°W
- Country: Portugal
- Region: Norte
- Intermunic. comm.: Tâmega e Sousa
- District: Porto
- Municipality: Marco de Canaveses

Area
  - Total: 12.48 km^{2} (4.82 sq mi)

Population (2011)
  - Total: 3,240
  - Density: 260/km^{2} (670/sq mi)
- Time zone: UTC+00:00 (WET)
  - Summer (DST): UTC+01:00 (WEST)
- Postal code: 4625
- Area code: 255
- Website: http://www.jf-vilaboadobispo.pt/

Vila Boa do Bispo is a civil parish in the municipality of Marco de Canaveses, in the northern district of Porto. The population in 2011 was 3,240, in an area of 12.48 km^{2}.

== History ==
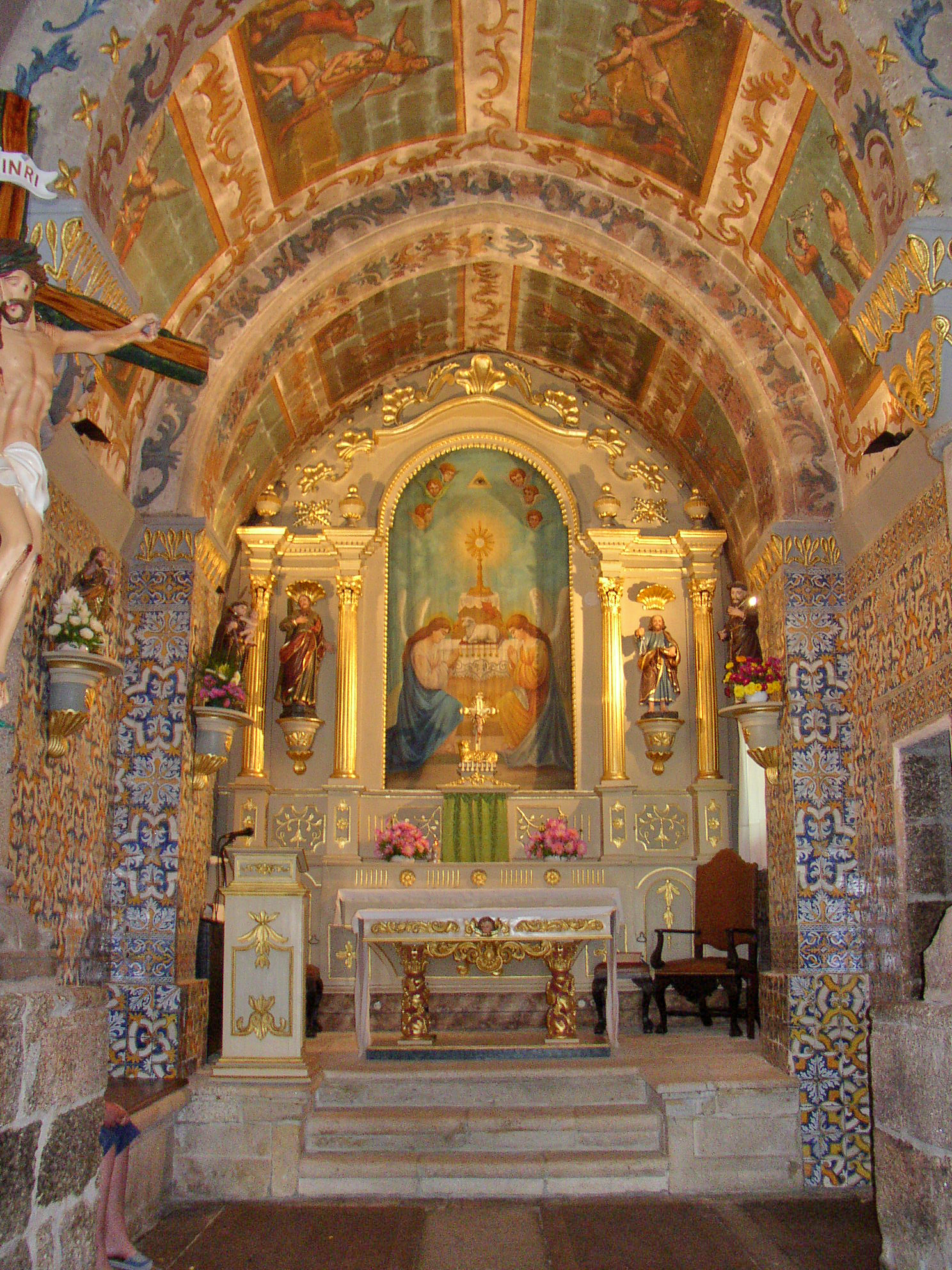
The interior altar and chancel of the parochial church of Santo André

Vila do Bishop arrived at its designation on 12 February 1141, by Afonso Henriques. Its name was so chosen for the fact that the region had rich fertile soils, and that Bishop Sisnando, Bishop of Porto, had lived in the region during several years.

A convent existed in the region, the Convent of Santa Maria de Vila Boa do Bispo, an important monastery of the Convent of the Canons Regular of Saint Augustine (the Crúzios). It was founded by Moninho Viegas in 990, responding to a process made during the battle of Valboa, where he captured the castle of Monte de Arados. The convent church was consecrated by Bishop Nonego, Bishop of Porto, and its first abbey was Rosardo, a native of France. The aforementioned Sisnando, was the successor of Nonego, and, after battling the Moors for several years, he resigned his commission in Porto and escaped to the convent, in the area that would then be named for his location (from 1030 to 1035).

The convent was retired/closed in 1605, but the deacon André Carneiro de Vasconcelos, known as the o Bravo (The Brave) did not accept the closure. He continued to stay on in the convent, with more liberty began to hunt, following his time in prayer and meditation. The convent continued to obtain its income from the parishes in its vicinity, including S. Lourenço do Douro, Paredes de Viadores, Várzea do Douro, S. Gens de Boelhe (Penafiel), S. Miguel de Bairros (Castelo de Paiva), S. Tiago de Paços (in the bishopric of Lamego), and, naturally, Vila Boa do Bispo.

With the exception of a short period when it was under the commandery system (its last commander was Miguel de Almeida), the Canons Regular lived at the convent until 1740. After this period it was occupied by Jesuits, until the attempted murder of King Jose I, when they were expelled by the Marquess of Pombal, and their possession abrogated to the Crown. It was sold, and began to be held by property-owners. At one time, the cult of São Vicent of Lisbon alleging their connection to the Canons Regular, took action to recover the convent, but their demands were dismissed in court.

The parochial church of Vila do Bispo, dating to the 17th century, is part of the convent's former possessions. The former cult occupied a smaller church, in ruins on the church grounds. The new church is tall and spacious, with a chapel decorated in azulejo tile in the Renaissance style.

== Geography ==
It is situated on the eastern slopes of the Rosem mountains, confronted by the civil parishes of Sande, S. Lourenço do Douro, Ariz, S. Paio de Favões, Rosem and Avessadas.

At its lowest point is the Tâmega River, which supported several watermills and proportioned the activity along the river beaches, in particular Festa-e-Lá, in the Praia do Ribeiro de Baixo.

The parish is crossed by Lourido River, springing from the Lidrais mountains, that flow into the Tâmega, and in the high country by the Geloas River, with its spring near Mexide.

In addition to the principal seat of Vila Boa do Bispo, the parish includes several "places" (Portuguese: lugares), or small settlements, such as: Albelo, Baceira, Bairral, Bouça, Bremes, Carcavelos, Casal, Casadela, Casal de Matos, Cavalhões, Cavalhõesinhos, Coalva, Deguilhas, Eidinho, Estrada, Fafiães, Formiga, Gandra, Lages, Lamoso, Lavandeira, Mexide, Meregeiro, Mosteiro, Outeirinho, Pinheiro, Pombal, Quebradas, Quintãs, Retiro, Ribeira de Baixo, Ribeira de Cima, Sidrais, Uzenda, Val, Valverde, Veiga and Vilar.
