= Garcia Moniz, o Gasco =

Portuguese knight (-1068)

- Knight
- Born: 11th-century
- Died: 1066 or 1068; Travanca, Amarante, Porto, Portugal
- Buried: Mosteiro de Travanca, Porto
- Noble family: House of Ribadouro
- Spouse: Elvira de Ribadouro
- Issue: Rodrigo Garcia de Ribadouro
- Father: Moninho Viegas, o Gasco
- Mother: Válida Trocosendes de Baião

Garcia Moniz de Ribadouro, called the Gascon (o Gasco) was a medieval Knight that participated in Reconquista against the Moors. He is credited with founding the Monastery of Travanca. He was the son of Munio Viegas and Válida Trocosendes de Baião, and was married to Elvira.

Garcia Moniz died in 1066 or 1068 fighting the Moors, during the campaign of conquest of Ribadouro.

== Biography ==
=== Origin ===
Old accounts tell that in 999, in a year of change in the Kingdom of León, when Bermudo II died and Count Mendo Gonçalves de Portucale became regent of the young Afonso V, a landing of Christians took place at the mouth of the Douro, commanded by Monio Viegas, the supposed founder of the Ribaduriense (or Gascan) lineage, who was said to have originated in Gascony. This information may be credible, but in the donation that Garcia Moniz made in 1068 to the King of Galicia, it refers to goods that he had inherited from his grandparents, so that they, the supposed parents of the “founder of Gascony” already had control in Ribadouro, and so Monio did not conquer such control, but inherited it, and therefore could not come from Gascony, as he was a native of Portugal, probably from a Portuguese place called Gasconha (or Casconha, in the current municipality of Paredes).

=== Early years ===
Garcia was the second son of the great Monio Viegas I of Ribadouro, who is generally considered the founder of the Ribadouro dynasty. His mother was called Válida Trocosendes de Baião, daughter of Dom Trutesendo Galindes de Baião and Moninho Viegas. From the patronymic, it is possible to say that his paternal grandfather was called Egas, probably Egas Moniz, a name that would become quite common in the family (in fact, it was the name of his eldest brother and heir to the house).

=== Founding of Travanca and the issue with the Monastery of Soalhães ===
The first news of Garcia is from 1008, when his father donated the town of Travanca to him, without the obligation to share it with his brother Egas, but with the obligation to build a monastery, which he founded that year.

It is also known that Garcia Moniz attacked the monastery of Soalhães, seizing its estates and also trying to obtain its patronage. Thus, the priests Afonso and João brought a case against him before the “vicars” of Ferdinand I of León in Portugal, namely Diogo Trutesendes, Mendo Dias and Gosendo Arnaldes de Baião. When the first instance failed, the vicars themselves took the matter to Palencia, before King Ferdinand himself and his council, composed of the bishops Alvito, Diogo Vestruariz, Mauselo, Miro and Sisnando (the bishop of Porto), Count Sancho Vasques, Nuno Mendes (probably the one who would later become the Portuguese leader) and Framego Dias and the Portuguese infantrymen Gomes Echegues de Sousa, Mendo Gonçalves da Maia and Godinho Viegas, in addition to several other nobles; there the case was decided in favour of the monastery, of which Garcia Moniz's grandparents were the patrons, and he ended up granting the estate in question to the priests.

=== Later years and death ===
He appears again in the documentation, in one of his last times, in 1066, when, with his wife Elvira, he made a vast donation to Garcia II of Galicia; in 1068 a Monio Viegas (II) appears calling him his nephew, and grandson of another Monio Viegas (I). It is known that in 1068 this Monio nephew received from the King of Galicia a part of the goods that his uncle had donated two years earlier.

According to tradition, Garcia died in 1068, in combat against the Moors :

En aquel tiempo llamavanle la Foz de Duero Malo, y lidiaron alli con grande exercito de Moros por muchas vezes y fue muerto por ellos en un recuentro dõ Garcia Moñiz el Gasco (...)

== Marriage and descendants ==
Garcia was married to Elvira de Ribadouro, of unknown origins. They had a son named:

- Rodrigo Garcia de Ribadouro (or Olívio Garcia), who inherited assets in the Land of Favões from his father.

== See also ==
- Moninho Viegas, o Gasco
- Egas Moniz I de Ribadouro
