= Santa Maria da Feira, Travanca, Sanfins e Espargo =

Civil parish in Portugal

- Civil parish
- Location in Portugal
- Coordinates: 40.926°N 8.544°W
- Country: Portugal
- Region: Norte
- Metropolitan area: Porto
- District: Aveiro
- Municipality: Santa Maria da Feira

Area
  - Total: 23.36 km^{2} (9.02 sq mi)

Population (2011)
  - Total: 18,194
  - Density: 780/km^{2} (2,000/sq mi)
- Time zone: UTC+00:00 (WET)
  - Summer (DST): UTC+01:00 (WEST)

Santa Maria da Feira, Travanca, Sanfins e Espargo is a civil parish in the municipality of Santa Maria da Feira, Portugal. It was formed in 2013 by the merger of the former parishes Feira, Travanca, Sanfins and Espargo. The population in 2011 was 18,194, in an area of 23.36 km^{2}.
