= Egas Moniz I de Ribadouro =

Lord of Ribadouro (977–1044)

Egas Moniz I of Ribadouro
- Lord of Ribadouro
- Tenure: 1022 - c. 1040
- Predecessor: Moninho Viegas, o Gasco
- Successor: Ermígio Viegas I of Ribadouro
- Full name: Egas Moniz de Riba Douro
- Born: 977
- Died: before 1044
- Noble family: House of Ribadouro
- Spouse: Toda Ermiges da Maia
- Issue: Ermígio Viegas I of Ribadouro Monio Viegas II, tenens Unisco Viegas, Senhora de Baião Pedro Viegas Énego Viegas II Gomes Viegas I Vivilide Viegas
- Father: Moninho Viegas, o Gasco

Egas Moniz I of Ribadouro, called The Gascon or The Old (c. 977 - before 1044) was a medieval nobleman of the County of Portugal, having been lord of Ribadouro, governor of Lamego and the founder of the Monastery of Cucujães.

== Biography ==
Egas was the eldest son of Moninho Viegas, o Gasco, who is generally considered the founder of the House of Ribadouro. His mother's name is unknown. From his patronymic, it is possible to say that his paternal grandfather was called Egas, probably Egas Moniz, a name that would become quite common in the family (in fact, it was the name of his eldest brother and heir to the house). From his father he inherited the epithet The Gascon, common in the family.

Old accounts tell that in 999, in a year of change in the kingdom of León, when Bermudo II died and Count Mendo Gonçalves of Portugal became regent of the young Afonso V of León, a landing of Christians took place at the mouth of the Douro, commanded by Monio Viegas, the supposed founder of the Ribaduriense (or Gascan) lineage, who was said to have originated in Gascony. This information may be credible, but in a donation that Garcia Moniz made in 1068 to the King of Galicia, it refers to goods that he had inherited from his grandparents, so that these, the supposed parents of the “founder from Gascony” already had control in Ribadouro, and so Monio did not conquer such control, but inherited it, and therefore could not come from Gascony, as he was a native of Portugal, probably from a Portuguese place called Gasconha (or Casconha in the current municipality of Paredes).

Egas inherited several assets in Ribadouro from his father, especially in the regions of Penafiel (Galegos, Canelas, etc.) and Castelo de Paiva (Pedorido, Raiva, etc.). He also exercised authority in these same lands, probably conferred by Afonso V of León and Bermudo III of León.

He married Toda Ermiges da Maia, who, in addition to being a first cousin of the first lord of Maia, Trastamiro Aboazar, was the maternal granddaughter of Trutesendo Galindes, from the influential lineage of the founders of Paço de Sousa Monastery.

It is known that he was already deceased in 1044.

== Marriage and descendants ==
Egas married Toda Ermiges da Maia, daughter of Ermígio Aboazar da Maia and his wife, Vivilide Trutesendes. The marriage resulted in the following descendants:

- Ermígio Viegas I of Ribadouro ( 1020 -?), lord of Ribadouro, married Unisco Pais.
- Monio Viegas II of Ribadouro (before 1044-before 1097), married Unisco Trastamires.
- Pedro Viegas de Ribadouro (before 1044-after 1070), married Sancha Pinioliz, and in second marriage Toda Pais.
- Unisco Viegas of Ribadouro (d. before 1118), married Egas Gondesendes II of Baião.
- Énego Viegas II (fl. 1044).
- Gomes Viegas I (before 1044-before 1071).
- Vivilide Viegas (before 1044-after 1080), married Fernando Jeremias.

== See also ==
- Moninho Viegas, o Gasco
- Garcia Moniz, o Gasco
