= Lactogal =

Portuguese food products company

- Type: Private
- Industry: Dairy
- Founded: 1996; 30 years ago
- Headquarters: Porto, Portugal
- Products: Food
- Website: lactogal.pt

Lactogal is a Portuguese food products company focused on dairy products, milk, fruit juice and mineral water. It is headquartered in Porto and is placed among the twenty largest agro-food European companies. It has major factories in Oliveira de Azeméis and Vila do Conde.

== History ==
Lactogal was founded in 1996 by the fusion between the three largest Portuguese companies in the sector: AGROS – União das Cooperativas de Produtores de Leite Entre Douro e o Minho e Trás-os-Montes, UCRL (headquartered in Espaço Agros in Póvoa de Varzim; founded in 1949); LACTICOOP – União das Cooperativas de Produtores de Leite entre Douro e Mondego, UCRL (headquartered in Aveiro; founded in 1962); and PROLEITE/MIMOSA S.A. (headquartered in Oliveira de Azeméis; founded in 1973). The company acquired the Spanish company Leche Celta in 2006, and in 2007, Lactogal was planning to complete before 2010 a new factory in Oliveira de Azeméis. In March 2016, Lactogal along with Lactalis opened war against Galician producers of organic milk. In November 2026, it was announced that Lactogal was preparing a merger with Spanish Calidad Pascual.

== Factories in Portugal ==
- Tocha – milk collecting and juice
- Oliveira de Azeméis – yogurt, UHT milk, cream
- Vila do Conde – UHT milk, butter, cream and yogurt
- Sanfins (Sever do Vouga) – cheese
- Aviz – cheese, butter
- Leça – pasteurized milk
- Lousado – milk collecting that is stored in order to be sent to Vila do Conde's factory
- Macedo de Cavaleiros – UHT milk
- Azores – cheese

== Brands ==
- Mimosa (diverse dairy food)
- Agros (diverse dairy food)
- Gresso (diverse dairy food)
- Vigor (diverse dairy food)
- Pleno (water with flavour)
- Matinal (diverse dairy food)
- Adágio (yogurt)
- Fresky (fruit juices)
- Águas Serra da Penha (mineral water)
- Primor (butter)
- Castelões (cheese)
- Serra Dourada (milk)
- Milhafre dos Açores (milk and butter)
- Leche Celta (diverse dairy food)

== See also ==
- List of food companies
