= Associação Empresarial de Portugal =

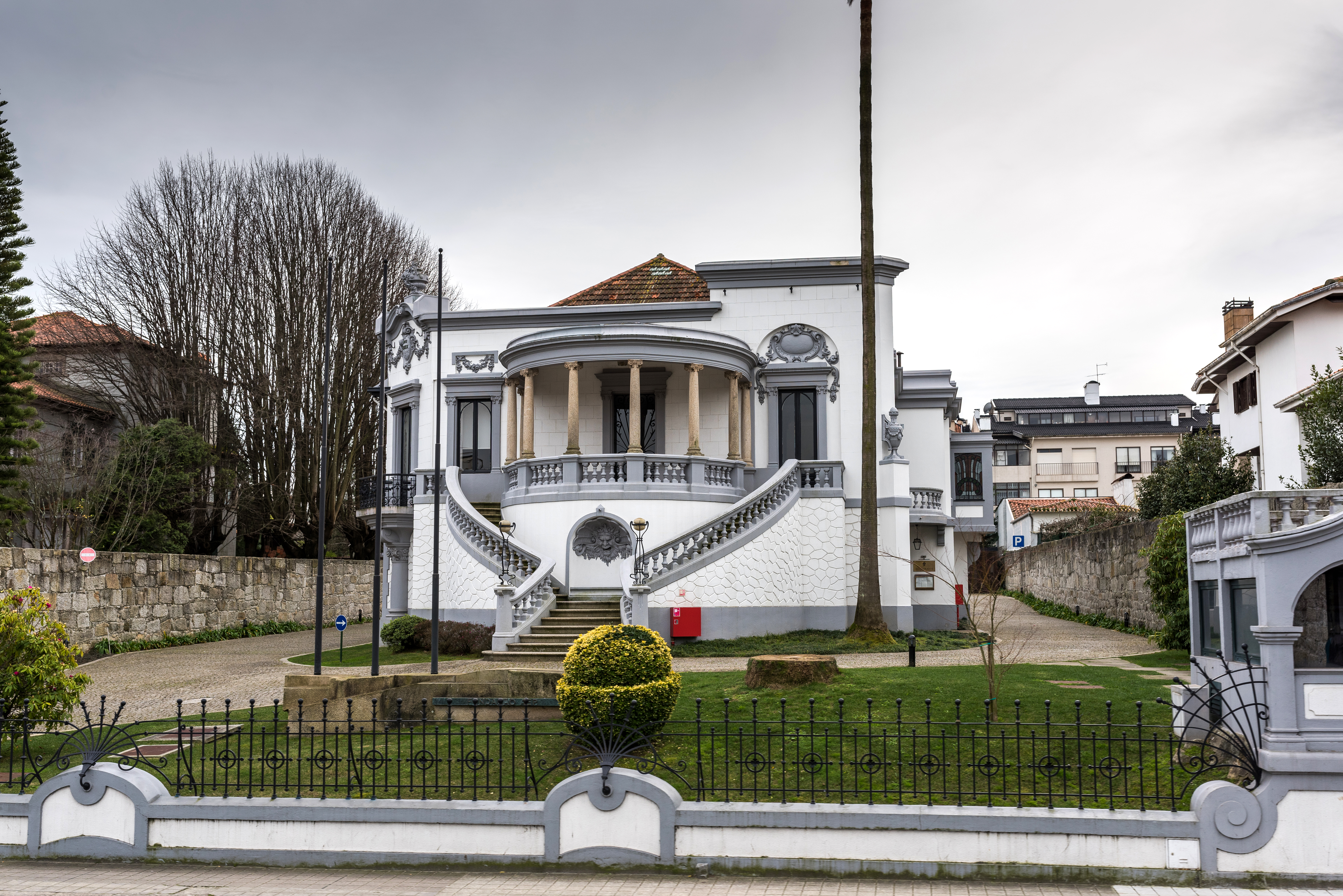
headquarters and restaurant, Associação Empresarial de Portugal, in Porto.

The Associação Empresarial de Portugal (AEP) (Portuguese Business Association) is a Portuguese chamber of commerce, based in Porto, Portugal and founded in 1849. Its first statutes, however, date from 1838.

In 1996, the Associação Empresarial de Portugal was officially upgraded to Chamber of Commerce and Industry of the Norte Region (decree no. 58/96 of 22 February).

== See also ==
- Visionarium
