= Espaço Agros =

Business park in Póvoa de Varzim

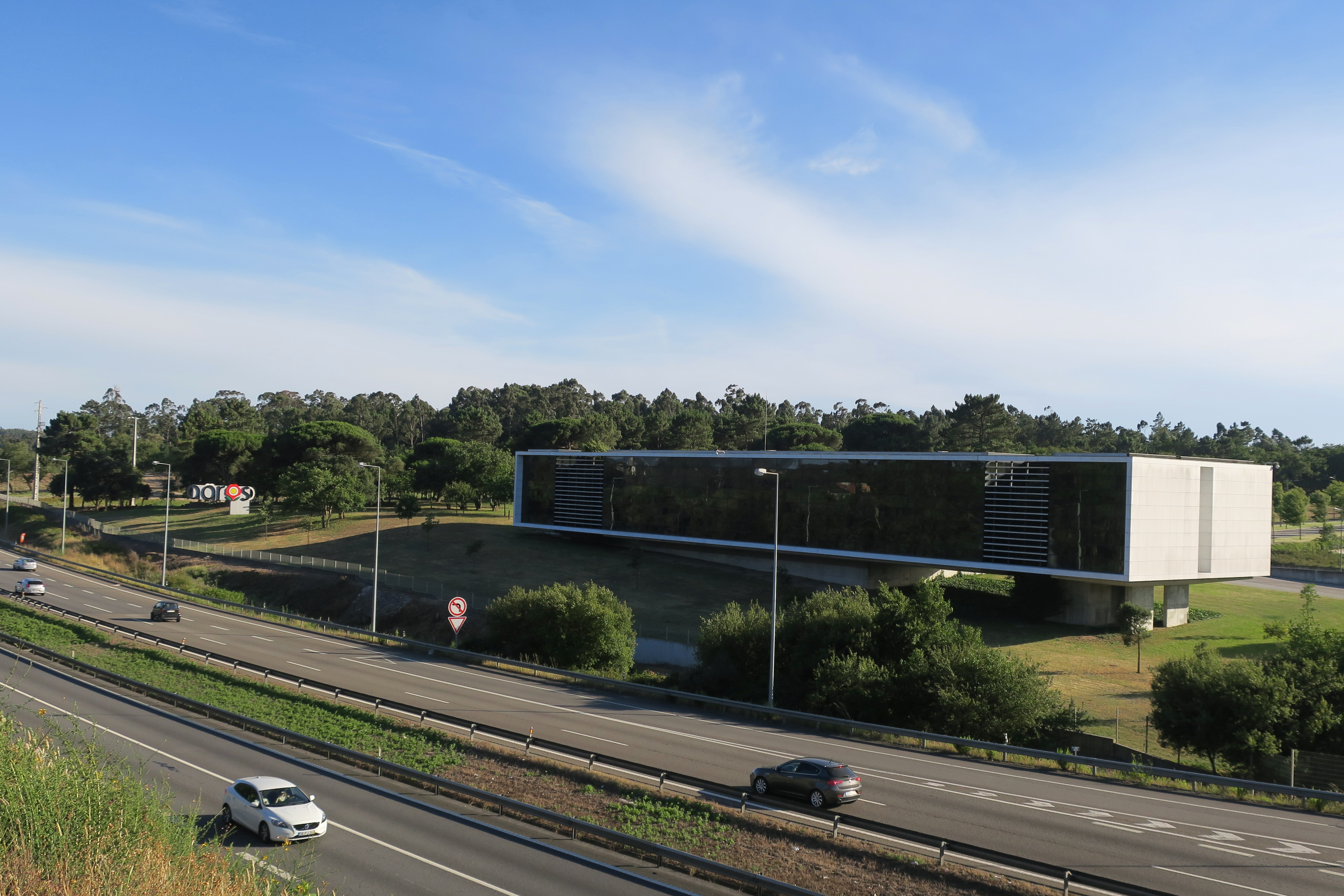
- Type: Private
- Location: Póvoa de Varzim
- Area: 22 hectares (54 acres)
- Created: 2012

Espaço Agros (in English Agros Space) is an Agros organization business park and headquarters located in a 22 hectares (54 acres) park, located in the Portuguese city of Póvoa de Varzim, with woods and ancient farming fields.

The plan for the park intended to keep the essential rural values of the location, with landscaping and environmental improvements. As such buildings and road construction were conditioned by this plan and quite apart from each other, and the most significant part of the woods were kept, in a clear intention to give the location a natural feeling of a large farm, as the location keeps in most part the picturesque rural landscaping. The park also preserves some of the rural ways that stretch to the woods, now used for walking and relaxation.

Beyond Agros Headquarters building, the park also includes an auditorium and a sports and leisure park. Pre-existing ruins were recovered and planned to integrate a museum area, the Agros Museum.

A small pre-existing water stream was used to improve landscaping of the park, by enlarging the rivulet banks and a building a small dam, thus creating a new lake that during construction immediately became a natural habitat for several species of migratory birds.

== History ==
The park is located in the woodlands and old farms known as Anjo, a traditional local Spring picnic area, part of the Anjo festival (Ivy festival) celebrations, at the outskirts of the city of Póvoa de Varzim. Significant part of the picturesque woods were destroyed when the then IC1 (now A28 motorway/freeway) was constructed in the early 1990s, damaging even Castro culture ruins.

Agros was the result of a 1949 joint venture by Vila do Conde and Póvoa de Varzim farming and milk cooperatives, that later extended to other cooperatives and now groups milk producers from all Northern Portugal. It founded Lactogal with other two cooperatives and produced, in 2011 alone, 525 million liters of milk, 60% of the national production. The company needed new headquarters and planned a business park.

The park started being built in 2003 and was inaugurated, on March 19, 2012, by the Portuguese Minister of Agriculture, Assunção Cristas and Braga archbishop, Jorge Ortiga.
