= Transport in Póvoa de Varzim =

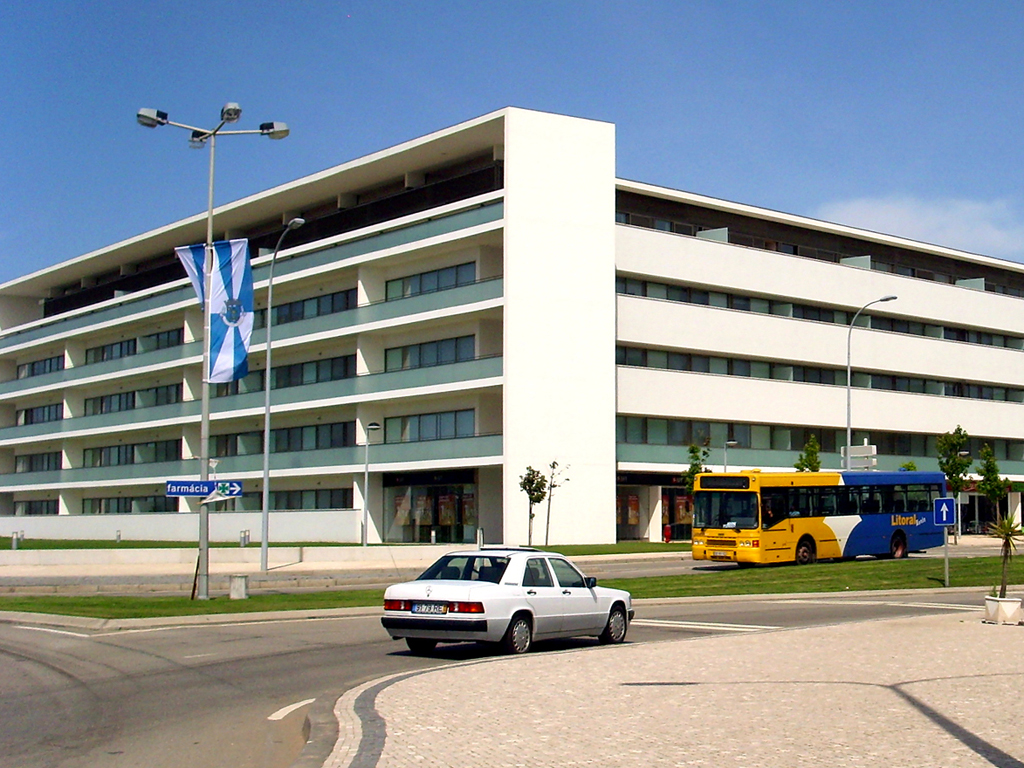
Line A bus leaving 25 de Abril Avenue during the Amorim Industry Area - Caxinas route.

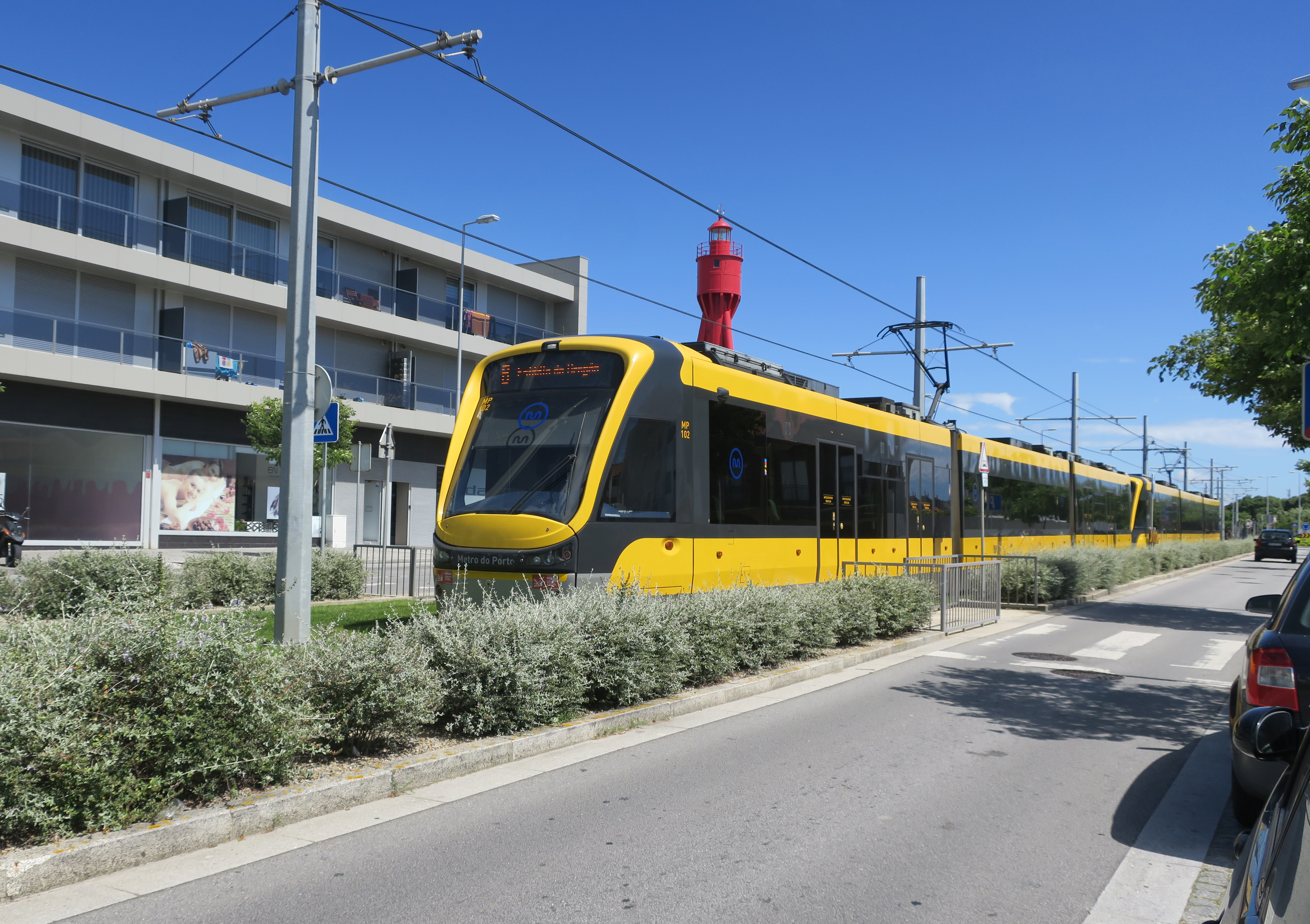
Line B Porto Metro tram-train in 2017.

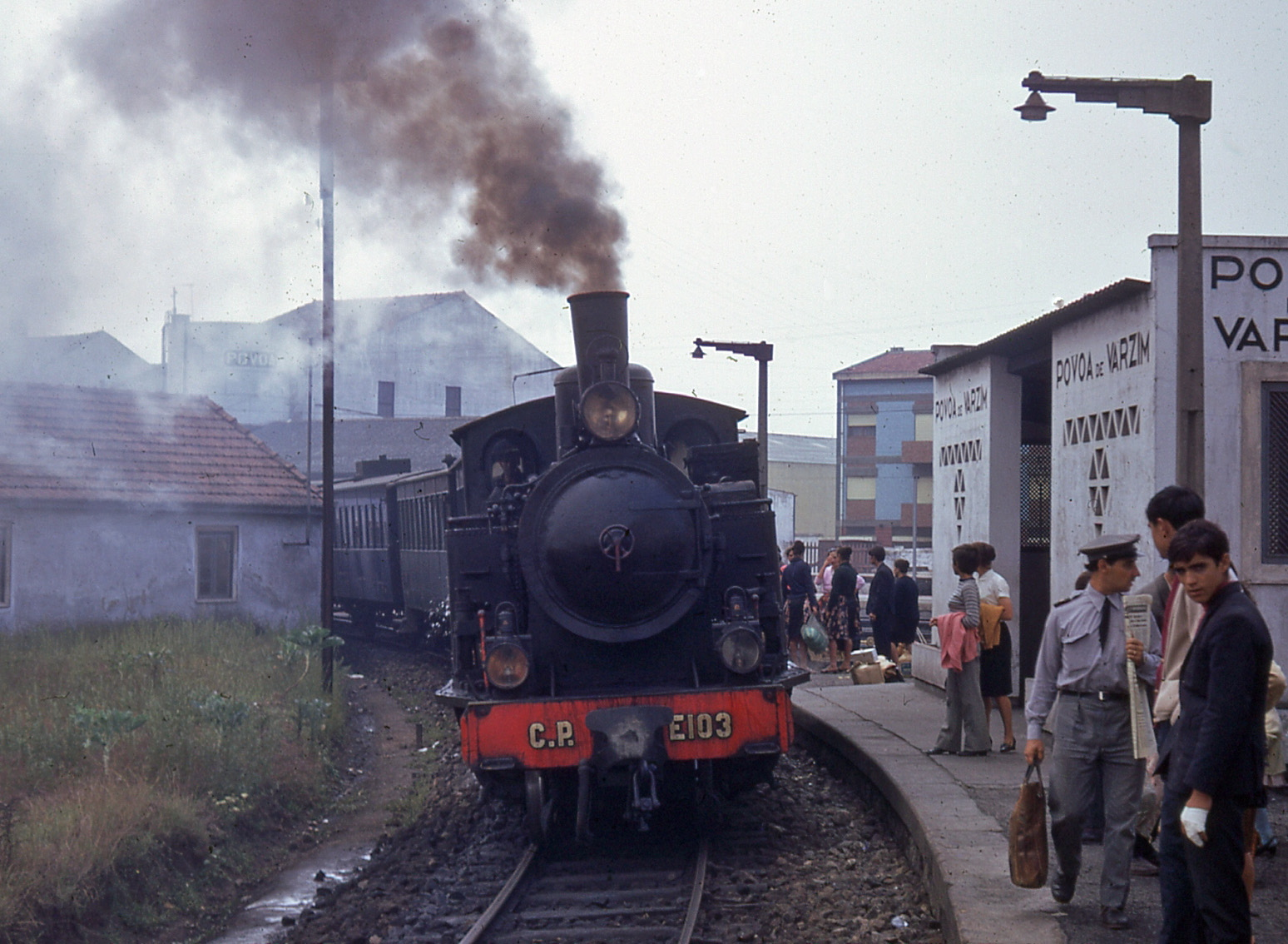
Steam train on the former route to Famalicão in 1970.

Póvoa de Varzim' is served by a transportation network that employs maritime, aerial and terrestrial travel. The terrestrial access infrastructure is composed of national motorways (freeways), the national roads system, and light rail metro. These infrastructures and the airport, bus terminal, marina and harbour are daily used by commuters.

Public transportation within the city is provided by private-owned companies. The Central de Camionagem is a terminus for urban and long-distance buses that provide mass transit in the surrounding region, namely the city's countryside, Porto, Minho Region, and Galicia in Spain. Litoral Norte as a wholly urban transportation network with 5 lines, while Linhares has the oldest bus network operating in the city, now owned by Transdev.

Póvoa de Varzim taxis are black with an olive green hardtop. The main taxi stands are located in Praça do Almada, in Póvoa de Varzim metro station and Largo das Dores. There are taxi centrals: Central Táxis Ribamar, Táxis Póvoa and a few others. Ribamar has a tourist service to tourist attractions away from the city center, including the Discovery Age carrack replica in Vila do Conde's riverside, the medieval Romanesque churches of Rates and Rio Mau, Cividade de Terroso and São Félix Hill.

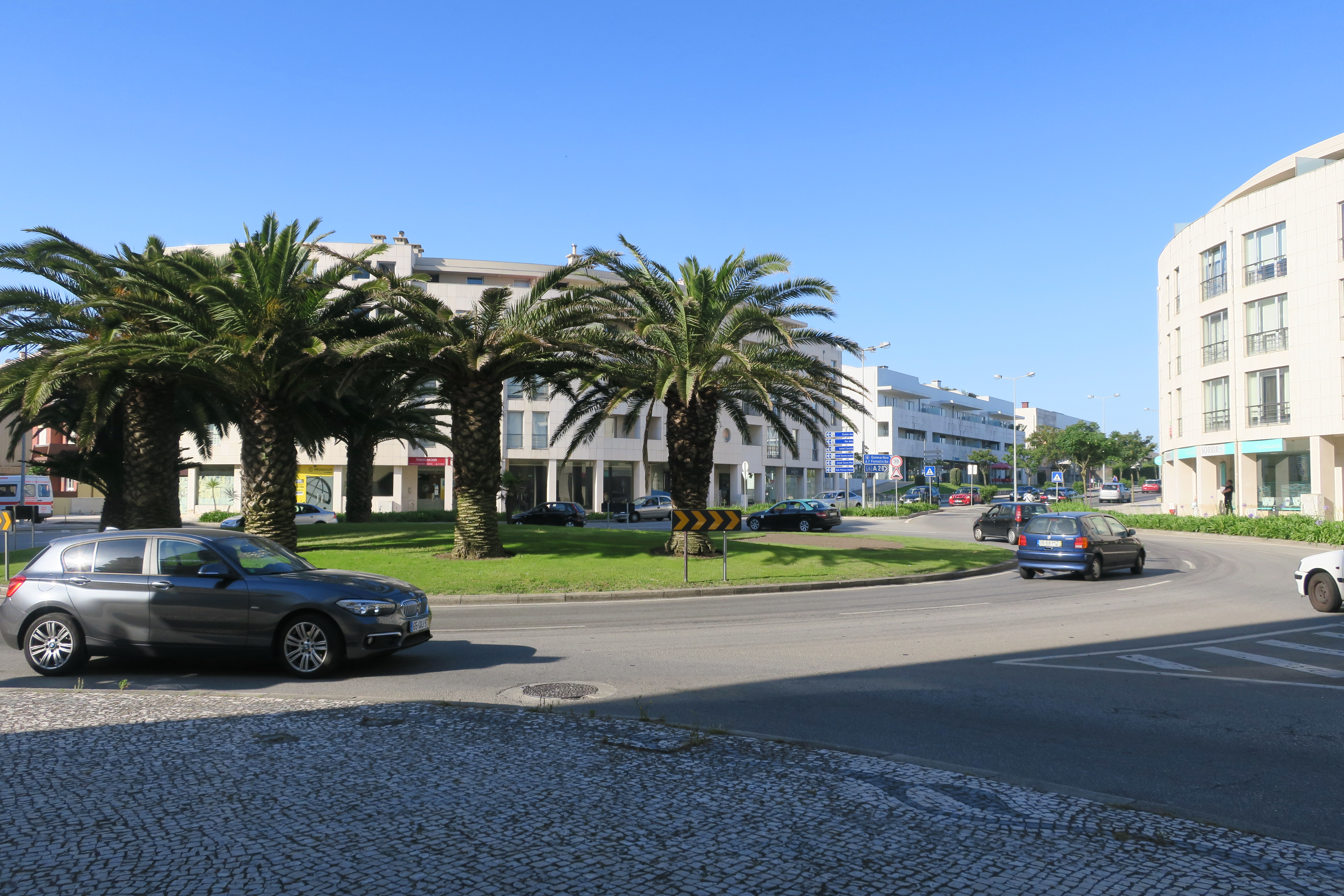
Roundabouts are the preferred method for traffic management in Póvoa de Varzim.

== Air ==
The Francisco Sá Carneiro Airport (IATA: OPO, ICAO: LPPR) is located 18 km (11 mi) south of Póvoa de Varzim. The airport, known outside the region as Porto Airport, is the second-busiest international airport in Portugal, moving over 9.3 million passengers in 2016. By car or taxi, it is quickly accessible (17 minutes) via the A28 motorway, linked to the A41 motorway and the airport's drop-off and pick-up areas, or the EN13 highway, the latter using the airport's EN107 accessway. Póvoa Aerodrome, officially known as S. Miguel de Laundos, is small, only 270 meters long for ultralight aviation and other small planes for leisure activities.

== Rail ==
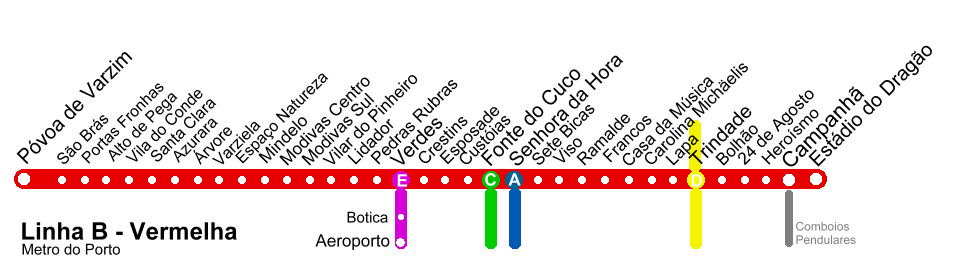
Lines B and E of Porto Metro.

Line B of Porto Metro links Póvoa de Varzim station to Porto and the airport with two services: a standard and a shuttle (the Expresso). Through Verdes station, Metro trains link the city and the airport. This waiting station to reach Póvoa de Varzim is a small public park near the airport, and it literally means the green park station. The line operates on a former railway, which opened in 1875 and closed in 2002 to give way for the metro. The railway network was expanded and reached Famalicão in 1881, it was closed entirely in 1995 due to an accident with a bus and became a rail trail.

== Roads ==
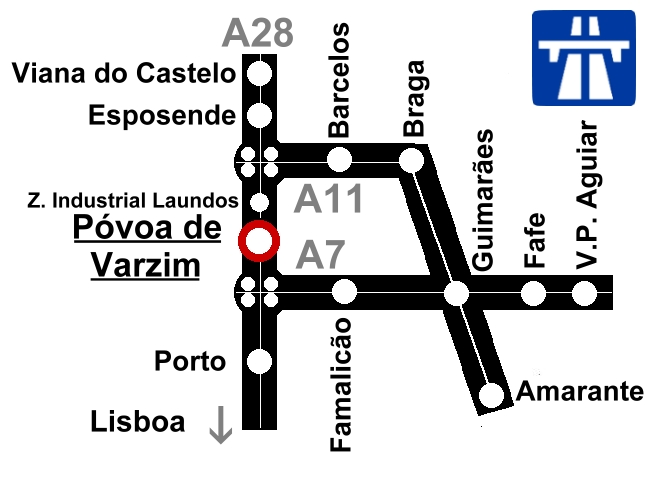
Motorway network which reach Póvoa de Varzim directly.

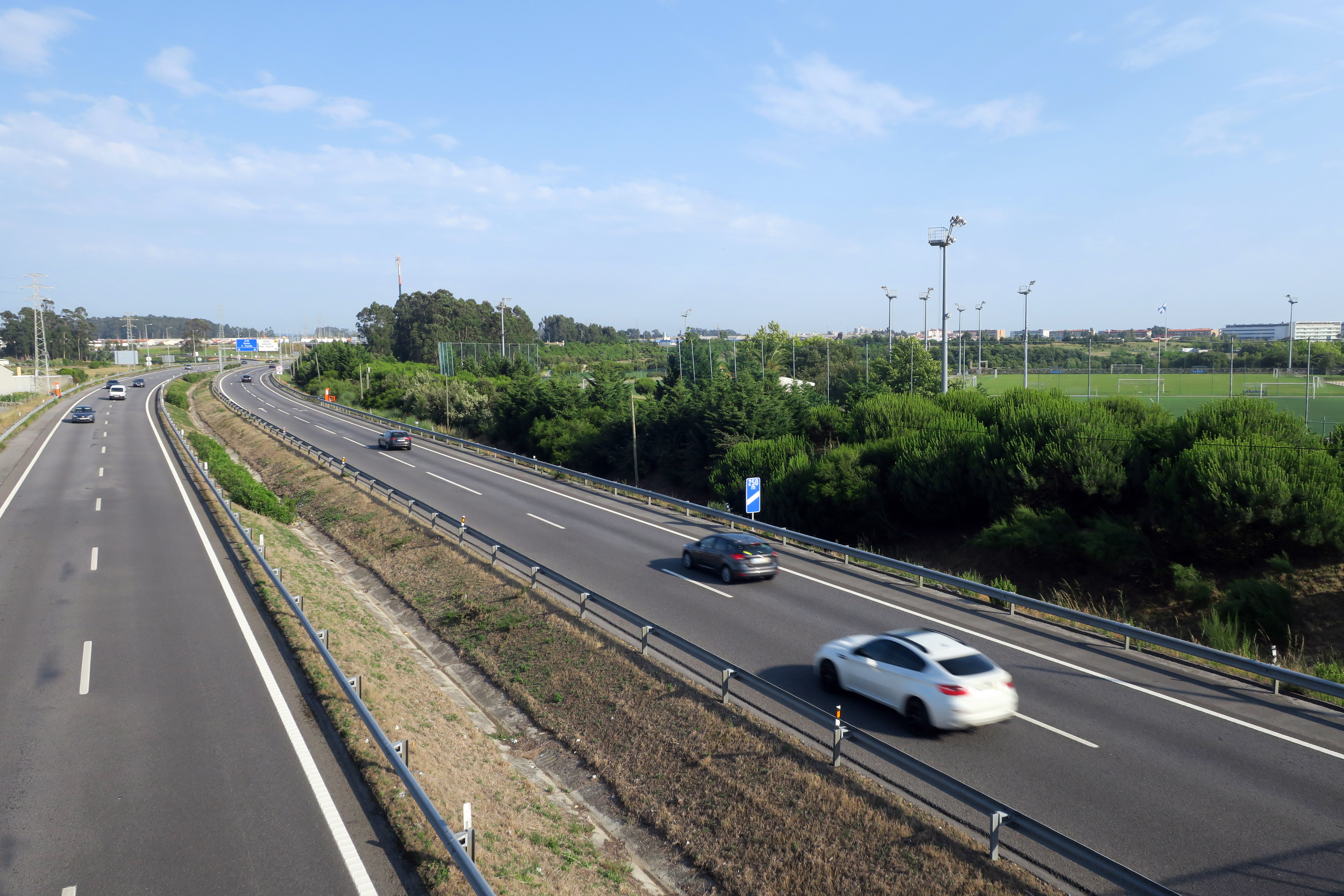
The A28 near the City Park.

The city is connected by road on a north–south axis reaching Viana do Castelo and the Spanish border to Porto by the A28 motorway. In Greater Porto, the A28 has the most popular suburban commercial areas of Northern Portugal with suburban shopping centers, large stand-alone stores, retail parks and outlets and reaches Porto's major thoroughfares and ring roads, including the VCI inner orbital motorway. Póvoa is also reached by the A7 (from Guimarães and Vila Nova de Famalicão) and A11 (from Braga and Barcelos) motorways on an east–west axis, through the south and north of the city, in that order, and both cross the A28. With these motorways, Póvoa de Varzim is accessible within minutes and central in the Northern Littoral Urban-Metropolitan Region of Northern Portugal, with 2.99 million inhabitants (2001 census).
