= Visionarium (Portugal) =

Science museum in Portugal

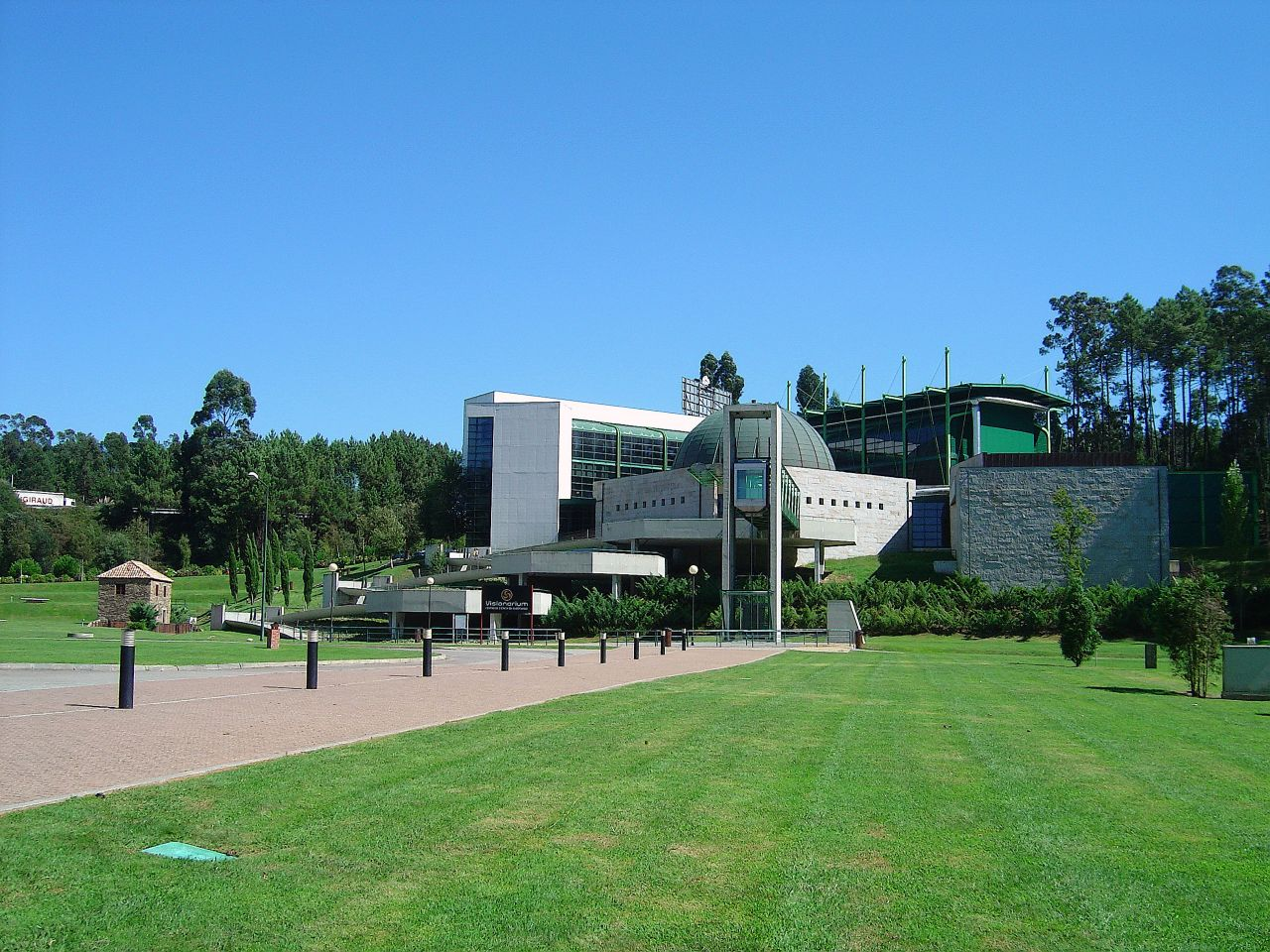
Visionarium

Visionarium is a science museum with interactive displays in Portuguese and English covering subjects ranging from the Portuguese voyages of discoveries to the interiors of microchips and cells. It is located in Santa Maria da Feira, Portugal.

Closed since April 2018

It was inspired on the Cité des Sciences et de l'Industrie (France) and the Exploratorium (USA).

== Location ==
The Visionarium — Centro de Ciência do Europarque is an interactive museum located in Espargo, Santa Maria da Feira, in its congressial perimeter Europarque, and is owned by Associação Empresarial de Portugal (Entrepreneurship Association of Portugal). Situated from only 15 minutes of Porto, it explains every detail about knowledge. With six divided rooms (odissey), an auditorium, it contains more than over 25.000 m2 of green space and services.

== Awards ==
Visionarium as a token of its outlooks won the "European Museum of the Year Award" from the "European Museum Forum" in 2000.

== Appearances ==
=== RTP ===
In 1999, RTP launched a 90 episodes mini-series containing its characters, with Portuguese voices. Going years into the future, and they will appear on books.

=== Jornal de Notícias ===
In 2006, they launched a series of 12 books containing 12 CDs, with many of the mini-series shown, containing its characters.

But not only do they make experiences multimedia, they also make experiments in the outdoors. Since its launch, there have been made countless experiments and experiences whether they are on Summer vacation or where the kids are in classes. All ages are suitable.

== Characters ==
There are characters describing each part that the museum has:

=== "Cósmico" ===
From the Universe Odyssey (a part of the museum in which it contains all the explanations of the Universe) is most described in which he appears in the books, which is only 2.

=== "Bit" ===
From the Information Odyssey (a part of the museum in which it explains all technological explanations, and other stuff like speaking into a virtual character from a screen and seeing yourself on front) knows all the technological explanations like binary numbers.

=== "Atomium" ===
From the Matter Odyssey (a part of the museum in which it explains all molecular explanations) knows everything in this part. He knows the periodic table even backwards and forwards.

=== "Vita" ===
From the Life Odyssey (a part of the museum in which its explained the meanings of life and even other simple stuff of the human body) knows all explainable reasons, in here.

=== "Cassiopeia" ===
From the Earth Odyssey (a part of the museum in which its known all of the Earth's history) knows everything in this manner.

=== "Labirinfo" ===
He is the center of all of Visionarium's facility, since, he's never seen in any odyssey room, or since he's always seen (in books) in which you have to make experiments in your own house.
