= Travanca (Santa Maria da Feira) =

Former civil parish in Portugal

- Civil parish
- Location in Portugal
- Coordinates: 40.911°N 8.574°W
- Country: Portugal
- Region: Norte
- Metropolitan area: Porto
- District: Aveiro
- Municipality: Santa Maria da Feira
- Disbanded: 2013

Area
  - Total: 5.72 km^{2} (2.21 sq mi)

Population (2001)
  - Total: 2,201
  - Density: 385/km^{2} (997/sq mi)
- Time zone: UTC+00:00 (WET)
  - Summer (DST): UTC+01:00 (WEST)

Church in Travanca, Santa Maria da Feira, Portugal.

Travanca is a former civil parish in the municipality of Santa Maria da Feira, Portugal. In 2013, the parish merged into the new parish Santa Maria da Feira, Travanca, Sanfins e Espargo. It has a population of 2,201 inhabitants and a total area of 5.72 km^{2}.
