= Egas Moniz o Aio =

Portuguese nobleman (1080-1146)

Egas Moniz, o Aio
- Rico-homem
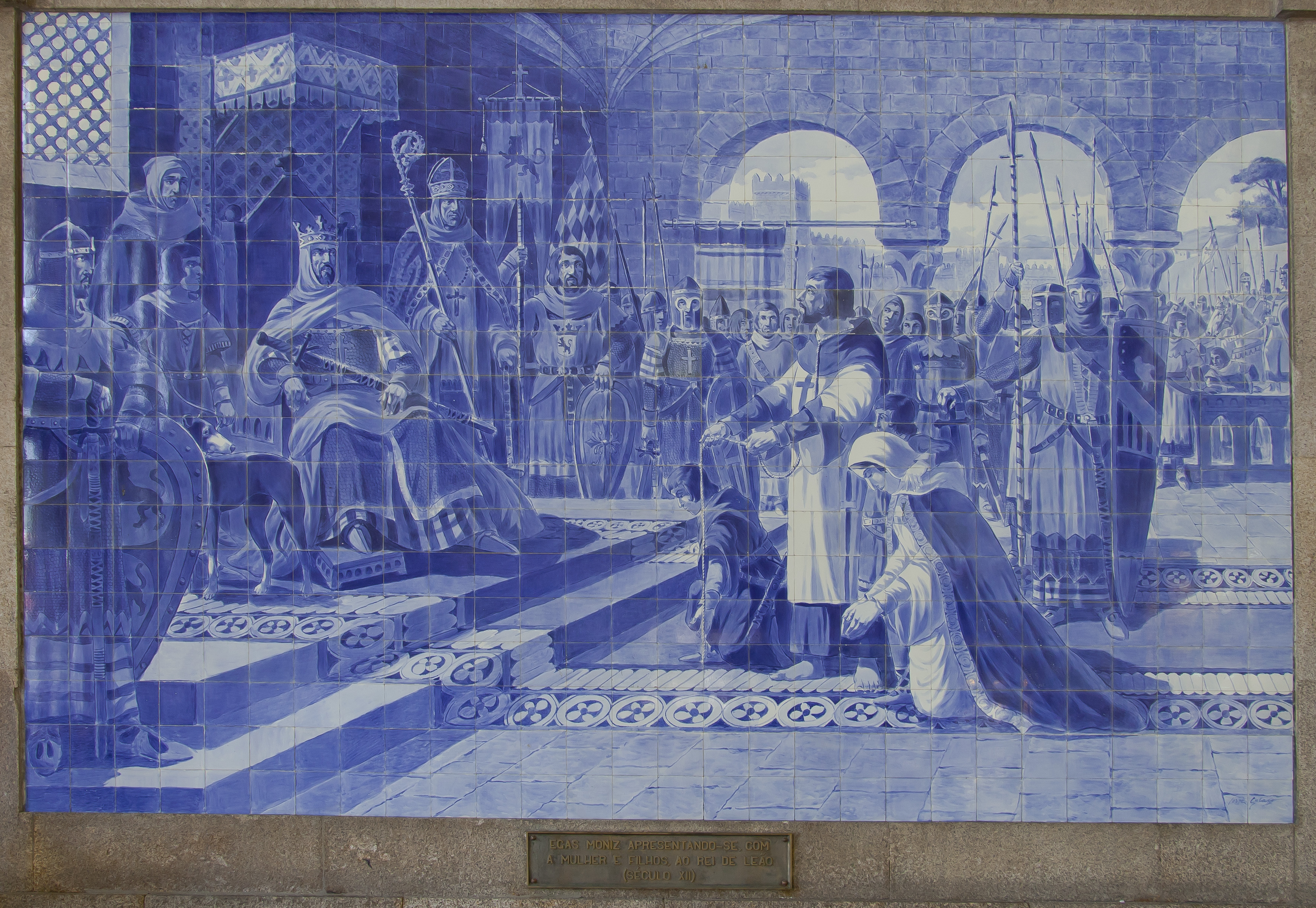
- Egas Moniz presents himself to the King of Leon with his family.
- Predecessor: Ermígio Moniz
- Successor: Lourenço Viegas
- Born: 1080; Portugal
- Died: 1146 (aged 65–66); Portugal
- Buried: Paço de Sousa Monastery, Penafiel, Porto
- Spouses: Dórdia Pais de Azevedo; Teresa Afonso
- Issue: Lourenço Viegas Afonso Viegas; Dórdia Viegas; Soeiro Viegas; Elvira Viegas Urraca Viegas
- Father: Monio Ermiges de Ribadouro
- Mother: Ouroana

Egas Moniz de Riba Douro, also known as o Aio ('the Tutor') (1080-1146) was a Portuguese nobleman, who served in the Portuguese Crown as the tutor of Afonso Henriques.

== Biography ==
Born in 1080 in the County of Portugal, Egas Moniz was a rich nobleman, member of the five major families of Entre-Douro-e-Minho of the 12th century, to whom Henry, Count of Portugal, entrusted the education of his son Afonso Henriques, a task that gave the nickname by which he became known. He was Tenente of Lamego between 1102-1111. Later in 1136, he served as Mordomo Mór of Portugal, until his death in 1146.

Egas Moniz was son of Monio Ermiges, o Gasco (the Gascon) and Ouroana. He had two wives, the first was Dórdia Pais de Azevedo, daughter of Paio Godins de Azevedo and Gontinha Nunes Velho. His second marriage was with the Countess Teresa Afonso de Celanova, a noble lady, daughter of Afonso Nunes de Celanova and Maria Fernandes.

== The Legend of Egas Moniz, o Aio ==
During the siege of Guimarães by Alfonso VII, then the county's political headquarters, the Emperor reportedly demanded an oath of vassalage from his cousin Afonso Henriques; Egas Moniz addressed the emperor, informing him that his cousin accepted submission. However, after relocating his capital to Coimbra (1131), Afonso Henriques felt an urgent need to destroy the ties that bound him to Alfonso VII. With that he declared war and invaded Galicia. As Afonso Henriques did not live up to what was agreed by his tutor, Egas Moniz, having learned what happened, went to Toledo, the imperial capital, accompanied by his wife and children, all barefoot, dressed in white and with a tether around the neck. Introducing himself to the Emperor, he let him dispose of his life and of his own as a pledge for maintaining the oath of allegiance promised by him but not fulfilled by his pupil. The emperor, moved with such honor, is said to have forgiven him and sent him back to Portugal in peace. This part of Egas Moniz's life is retold by Camões in the Lusíadas Song III (stanzas 35-40).
