= Sanfins (Santa Maria da Feira) =

Former civil parish in Portugal

- Civil parish
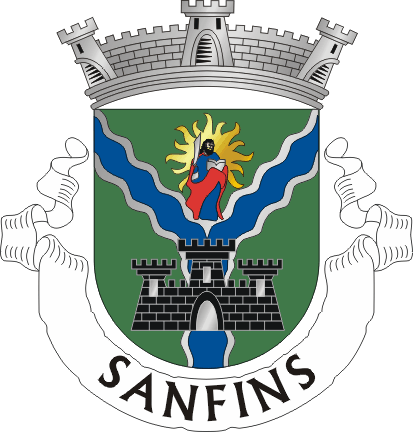
- Coat of arms

- Location in Portugal
- Coordinates: 40.928°N 8.525°W
- Country: Portugal
- Region: Norte
- Metropolitan area: Porto
- District: Aveiro
- Municipality: Santa Maria da Feira
- Disbanded: 2013

Area
  - Total: 3.70 km^{2} (1.43 sq mi)

Population (2001)
  - Total: 1,970
  - Density: 530/km^{2} (1,400/sq mi)
- Time zone: UTC+00:00 (WET)
  - Summer (DST): UTC+01:00 (WEST)

Sanfins is a former civil parish in the municipality of Santa Maria da Feira, Portugal. In 2013, the parish merged into the new parish Santa Maria da Feira, Travanca, Sanfins e Espargo. It has a population of 1,970 inhabitants and a total area of 3.70 km^{2}. Its postal code is 4520.

The parish was first mentioned in 1288. The parish of Sanfins including its other parishes of the municipality lies in the Vouga Valley.

== Sites of interests ==
- Mala-Posta de Sanfins Building, Mala-Posta de São Jorge Building or Souto Redondo
