= List of freguesias of Portugal: P =

The freguesias (civil parishes) of Portugal are listed in by municipality according to the following format:

- concelho
  - freguesias

== Paços de Ferreira ==
- Arreigada
- Carvalhosa
- Codessos
- Eiriz
- Ferreira
- Figueiró
- Frazão
- Freamunde
- Lamoso
- Meixomil
- Modelos
- Paços de Ferreira
- Penamaior
- Raimonda
- Sanfins de Ferreira
- Seroa

== Palmela ==
- Marateca
- Palmela
- Pinhal Novo
- Poceirão
- Quinta do Anjo

== Pampilhosa da Serra ==
- Cabril
- Dornelas do Zêzere
- Fajão
- Janeiro de Baixo
- Machio
- Pampilhosa da Serra
- Pessegueiro
- Portela do Fojo
- Unhais-o-Velho
- Vidual

== Paredes ==
- Aguiar de Sousa
- Astromil
- Baltar
- Beire
- Besteiros
- Bitarães
- Castelões de Cepeda
- Cete
- Cristelo
- Duas Igrejas
- Gandra
- Gondalães
- Lordelo
- Louredo
- Madalena
- Mouriz
- Parada de Todeia
- Rebordosa
- Recarei
- Sobreira
- Sobrosa
- Vandoma
- Vila Cova de Carros
- Vilela

== Paredes de Coura ==
- Agualonga
- Bico
- Castanheira
- Cossourado
- Coura
- Cristelo
- Cunha
- Ferreira
- Formariz
- Infesta
- Insalde
- Linhares
- Mozelos
- Padornelo
- Parada
- Paredes de Coura
- Porreiras
- Resende
- Romarigães
- Rubiães
- Vascões

== Pedrógão Grande ==
- Graça
- Pedrógão Grande
- Vila Facaia

== Penacova ==
- Carvalho
- Figueira de Lorvão
- Friúmes
- Lorvão
- Oliveira do Mondego
- Paradela
- Penacova
- São Paio de Mondego
- São Pedro de Alva
- Sazes do Lorvão
- Travanca do Mondego

== Penafiel ==
- Abragão
- Boelhe
- Bustelo
- Cabeça Santa
- Canelas
- Capela (Penafiel)
- Castelões
- Croca
- Duas Igrejas
- Eja
- Figueira
- Fonte Arcada
- Galegos
- Guilhufe
- Irivo
- Lagares
- Luzim
- Marecos
- Milhundos
- Novelas
- Oldrões
- Paço de Sousa
- Paredes
- Penafiel
- Perozelo
- Pinheiro
- Portela
- Rans
- Recezinhos (São Mamede)
- Recezinhos (São Martinho)
- Rio de Moinhos
- Rio Mau
- Santa Marta
- Santiago de Subarrifana
- Sebolido
- Urrô
- Valpedre
- Vila Cova

== Penalva do Castelo ==
- Antas
- Castelo de Penalva
- Esmolfe
- Germil
- Ínsua
- Lusinde
- Mareco
- Matela
- Pindo
- Real
- Sezures
- Trancozelos
- Vila Cova do Covelo

== Penamacor ==
- Águas
- Aldeia de João Pires
- Aldeia do Bispo
- Aranhas
- Bemposta
- Benquerença
- Meimão
- Meimoa
- Pedrógão de São Pedro www.pedrogao.com
- Penamacor
- Salvador
- Vale da Senhora da Póvoa

== Penedono ==
- Antas
- Beselga
- Castainço
- Granja
- Ourozinho
- Penedono
- Penela da Beira
- Póvoa de Penela
- Souto

== Penela ==
- Cumeeira
- Espinhal
- Penela (Santa Eufémia)
- Penela (São Miguel)
- Podentes
- Rabaçal

== Peniche ==
- Atouguia da Baleia
- Ferrel
- Peniche (Ajuda)
- Peniche (Conceição)
- Peniche (São Pedro)
- Serra d' El-Rei

== Peso da Régua ==
- Canelas
- Covelinhas
- Fontelas
- Galafura
- Godim
- Loureiro
- Moura Morta
- Peso da Régua
- Poiares
- Sedielos
- Vilarinho dos Freires
- Vinhós

== Pinhel ==
- Alverca da Beira
- Atalaia
- Azevo
- Bogalhal
- Bouça Cova
- Cerejo
- Cidadelhe
- Ervas Tenras
- Ervedosa
- Freixedas
- Gouveia
- Lamegal
- Lameiras
- Manigoto
- Pala
- Pereiro
- Pinhel
- Pínzio
- Pomares
- Póvoa d' El-Rei
- Safurdão
- Santa Eufémia
- Sorval
- Souro Pires
- Valbom
- Vale de Madeira
- Vascoveiro

== Pombal ==
- Abiul
- Albergaria dos Doze
- Almagreira
- Carnide
- Carriço
- Guia
- Ilha
- Louriçal
- Mata Mourisca
- Meirinhas
- Pelariga
- Pombal
- Redinha
- Santiago de Litém
- São Simão de Litém
- Vermoil
- Vila Chã

== Ponta Delgada (Azores) ==
- Ajuda da Bretanha
- Arrifes
- Candelária
- Capelas
- Covoada
- Fajã de Baixo
- Fajã de Cima
- Fenais da Luz
- Feteiras
- Ginetes
- Livramento
- Mosteiros
- Pilar da Bretanha
- Relva
- Remédios
- Santa Bárbara
- Santa Clara
- São José
- São Pedro
- São Roque
- São Sebastião
- Santo António
- São Vicente Ferreira
- Sete Cidades

== Ponta do Sol (Madeira) ==
- Canhas
- Madalena do Mar
- Ponta do Sol

== Ponte da Barca ==
- Azias
- Boivães
- Bravães
- Britelo
- Crasto
- Cuide de Vila Verde
- Entre Ambos-os-Rios
- Ermida
- Germil
- Grovelas
- Lavradas
- Lindoso
- Nogueira
- Oleiros
- Paço Vedro de Magalhães
- Ponte da Barca
- Ruivos
- Sampriz
- Touvedo (Salvador)
- Touvedo (São Lourenço)
- Vade (São Pedro)
- Vade (São Tomé)
- Vila Chã (Santiago)
- Vila Chã (São João Baptista)
- Vila Nova de Muía

== Ponte de Lima ==
- Anais
- Arca
- Arcos
- Arcozelo
- Ardegão
- Bárrio
- Beiral do Lima
- Bertiandos
- Boalhosa
- Brandara
- Cabaços
- Cabração
- Calheiros
- Calvelo
- Cepões
- Correlhã
- Estorãos
- Facha
- Feitosa
- Fojo Lobal
- Fontão
- Fornelos
- Freixo
- Friastelas
- Gaifar
- Gandra
- Gemieira
- Gondufe
- Labruja
- Labrujó
- Mato
- Moreira do Lima
- Navió
- Poiares
- Ponte de Lima
- Queijada
- Rebordões (Santa Maria)
- Rebordões (Souto)
- Refóios do Lima
- Rendufe
- Ribeira
- Sá
- Sandiães
- Santa Comba
- Santa Cruz do Lima
- Seara
- Serdedelo
- Vilar das Almas
- Vilar do Monte
- Vitorino das Donas
- Vitorino dos Piães

== Ponte de Sor ==
- Foros de Arrão
- Galveias
- Longomel
- Montargil
- Ponte de Sor
- Tramaga
- Vale de Açor

== Portalegre ==
- Alagoa
- Alegrete
- Carreiras
- Fortios
- Reguengo
- Ribeira de Nisa
- São Julião
- São Lourenço
- Sé
- Urra

== Portel ==
- Alqueva
- Amieira
- Monte do Trigo
- Oriola
- Portel
- Santana
- São Bartolomeu do Outeiro
- Vera Cruz

== Portimão ==
- Alvor
- Mexilhoeira Grande
- Portimão

== Porto ==
=== Until 28 January 2013 ===
- Aldoar
- Bonfim
- Campanhã
- Cedofeita
- Foz do Douro
- Lordelo do Ouro
- Massarelos
- Miragaia
- Nevogilde
- Paranhos
- Ramalde
- Santo Ildefonso
- São Nicolau
- Sé
- Vitória

=== Effective 29 January 2013 ===
- Aldoar, Foz do Douro e Nevogilde
- Bonfim
- Campanhã
- Cedofeita, Santo Ildefonso, Sé, Miragaia, São Nicolau e Vitória
- Lordelo do Ouro e Massarelos
- Paranhos
- Ramalde

== Porto de Mós ==
=== Until 28 January 2013 ===
- Alcaria
- Alqueidão da Serra
- Alvados
- Arrimal
- Calvaria de Cima
- Juncal
- Mendiga
- Mira de Aire
- Pedreiras
- Porto de Mós (São João Baptista)
- Porto de Mós (São Pedro)
- São Bento
- Serro Ventoso

=== Effective 29 January 2013 ===
- Alqueidão da Serra
- Alvados e Alcaria
- Arrimal e Mendiga
- Calvaria de Cima
- Juncal
- Mira de Aire
- Pedreiras
- Porto de Mós - São João Baptista e São Pedro
- São Bento
- Serro Ventoso

== Porto Moniz (Madeira) ==
- Achadas da Cruz
- Porto Moniz
- Ribeira da Janela
- Seixal

== Porto Santo (Madeira) ==
- Porto Santo

== Póvoa de Lanhoso ==
- Águas Santas
- Ajude
- Brunhais
- Calvos
- Campos
- Covelas
- Esperança
- Ferreiros
- Fonte Arcada
- Frades
- Friande
- Galegos
- Garfe
- Geraz do Minho
- Lanhoso
- Louredo
- Monsul
- Moure
- Oliveira
- Póvoa de Lanhoso (N Senhora do Amparo)
- Rendufinho
- Santo Emilião
- São João de Rei
- Serzedelo
- Sobradelo da Goma
- Taíde
- Travassos
- Verim
- Vilela

== Póvoa de Varzim ==
- A Ver-o-Mar
- Aguçadoura
- Amorim
- Argivai
- Balasar
- Beiriz
- Estela
- Laundos
- Navais
- Póvoa de Varzim
- Rates
- Terroso

== Povoação (Azores) ==
- Água Retorta
- Faial da Terra
- Furnas
- Nossa Senhora dos Remédios
- Povoação
- Ribeira Quente

== Praia da Vitória (Azores) ==
- Agualva
- Biscoitos
- Cabo da Praia
- Fonte do Bastardo
- Fontinhas
- Lajes
- Porto Martins
- Praia da Vitória
- Quatro Ribeiras
- São Brás
- Vila Nova

== Proença-a-Nova ==
- Alvito da Beira
- Montes da Senhora
- Proença-a-Nova
- São Pedro do Esteval
- Sobreira Formosa
