= Parada (Paredes de Coura) =

- Civil parish
- Location in Portugal
- Coordinates: 41.915°N 8.526°W
- Country: Portugal
- Region: Norte
- Intermunic. comm.: Alto Minho
- District: Viana do Castelo
- Municipality: Paredes de Coura

Area
  - Total: 5.90 km^{2} (2.28 sq mi)

Population (2011)
  - Total: 298
  - Density: 50.5/km^{2} (131/sq mi)
- Time zone: UTC+00:00 (WET)
  - Summer (DST): UTC+01:00 (WEST)
- Website: www.jf-parada-pcoura.com

Parada is a civil parish in the municipality of Paredes de Coura, Portugal. The population in 2011 was 298, in an area of 5.90 km^{2}.

== Geography ==
The parish is bounded by Padornelo to the north, Vascões and Bico e Cristelo to the south. The source of the Rio Coura is near the parish.

== History ==
Parada is a historic rural parish in Paredes de Coura, Portugal, whose administrative roots trace back to the 13th-century reign of King D. Afonso III. Nestled near the source of the Coura River and tightly integrated into the pristine Corno do Bico Protected Landscape, the village developed a deeply agrarian identity centered around mountain farming and historic water mills. Its rich heritage is written into its traditional granite architecture, marked predominantly by a 1758 Baroque church, noble manors, and sacred roadside shrines known as alminhas. Today, Parada blends its centuries-old religious traditions, like the annual July festival for Nossa Senhora das Dores, with an active modern community life anchored by its cultural and sports association (ACDS Parada), founded in 1993.

== Economy ==
Its main economic activity is agriculture, civil construction and ultimately employment in the Castanheira industrial area, São Bento and in Cerveira. Its main productions are corn, potatoes, wine and others.

== Associations ==
- ACDSP – Associação Cultural Desportiva e Social de Parada (Parada Sporting and Social Cultural Association)
