= Castle of Curutelo =

Castle in Viana do Castelo District, Portugal

- Castelo do Curutelo
- Viana do Castelo, Alto Minho, Norte Region, Portugal in Portugal
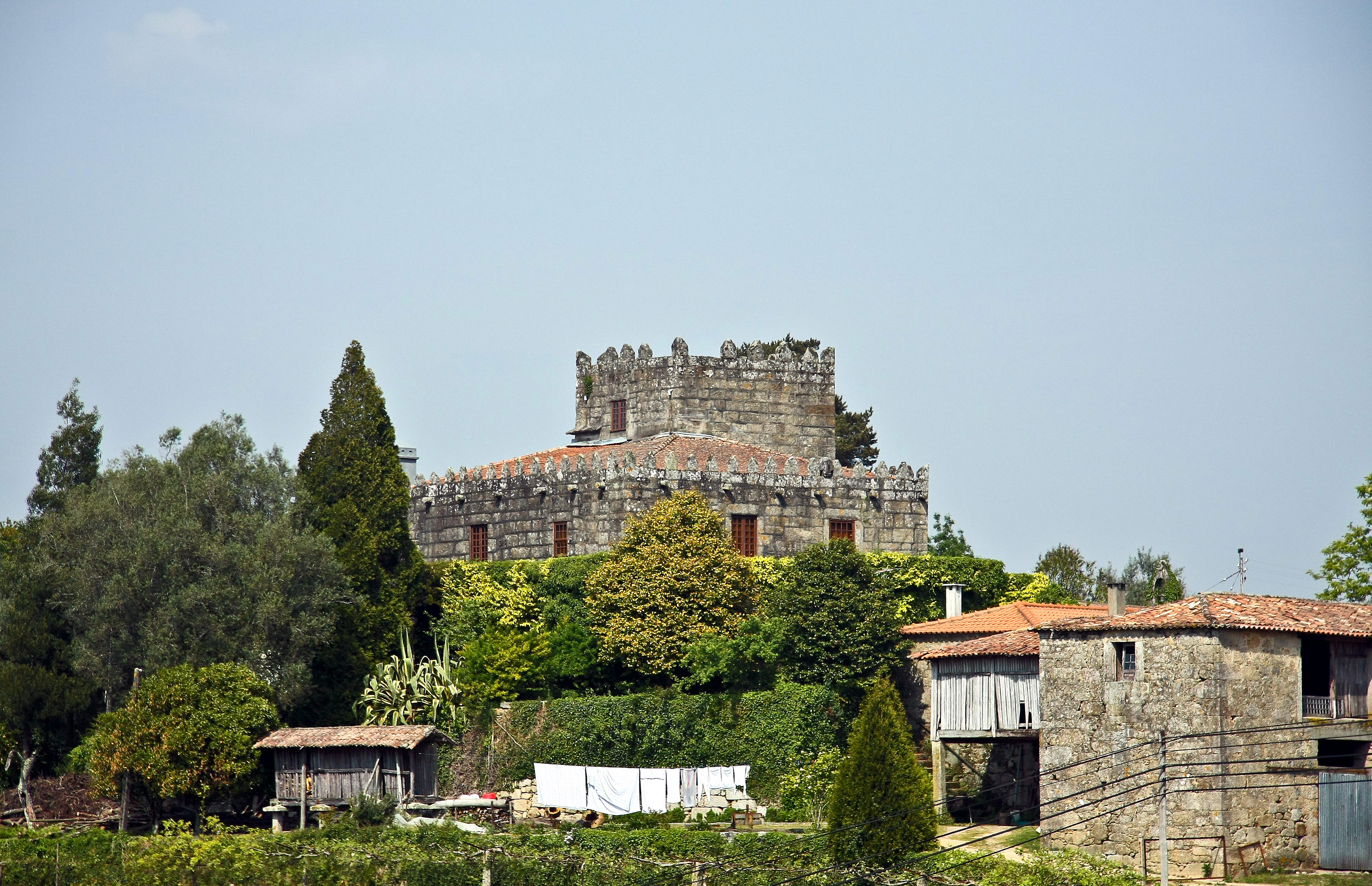

Site information
- Type: Castle
- Owner: Portuguese Republic
- Open to the public: Public

Location
- Coordinates: 41°39′12″N 8°36′19″W

Site history
- Built: 800
- Materials: Granite

The Curutelo Castle (Portuguese: Castelo do Curutelo) is a well-preserved medieval castle located in the civil parish of Ardegão, Freixo e Mato, in the municipality of Ponte de Lima, Portuguese Viana do Castelo.

== History ==
There are many interpretations as to the construction of the palace of Curutelo. Félix Machado, in his notes on the nobility of the Count of São Pedro, stated that the structure existed during the time of Ferdinand I of León who conquered Coimbra from the Moors, and gave it to Nuno Nudiz. João Salgado de Araújo, Abbey of Perre, indicates that it was constructed by the Asturian nobleman Alarico (powerful descendant of the Goths) around 800. The building remained in the inheritance of his descendants until D. Urraca Landufes, who married Nuno Nudiz. Figueiredo Guerra indicates that the building was erected in 1532, by João Rodrigues do Lago, and that there was no castle at the time that Nuno Viegas and his wife, Inês Dias, instituting the Majorat, which was later confirmed by D. João I on 14 December 1395. Figueiredo da Guerra suggests that the estate palace was built in the first half of the 16th century., and followed a typology inspired by the medieval tower-residence.

A document dating from 1395 identified that Nuno Viegas do Rego and his wife, Inês Dias, established a vineyard in the Quinta de Coucieiro and Quinta de Curutelo, for his son Álvaro Viegas. At the time, there was no indication or reference of a castle or tower. The majorat was confirmed by King D. João I in December of the same year.

During the stewardship of the 5th Majorat of Coucieiro, around 1532, the lands were sold to Duke D. Jaime, becoming the owner of the residence, tower, castle and estate of Curutelo. He eventually called on the nobleman João Rodrigues de Lago (son of Rui Gomes) to render services and conquer Azamar, resulting in the estate becoming the possession of his descendant in the following centuries.

Following the marriage of D. Maria de Felgueiras Gajo with Dr. Rodrigo Augusto Cerqueira Velozo (a Barcelos lawyer) in 1867, work was begun on modernizing the tower, that included opening spaces for new windows and doors. Yet, not having any heirs, before her death, D. Maria Felgueiras Gajo, named her husband as benefactor, resulting in litigation in the courts, that ultimately sided with Dr. Rodrigo Velozo.

In 1902, the Esposende capitalist and former merchant of Porto, Valentim Ribeiro da Fonseca purchased the estate.

== Architecture ==
The structure is situated in a harmonious, rural landscape, half-way up the mount of São Cristóvão dos Milagres, also known as São Cristóvão do Curutelo, overlooking a small valley covered in forest. It is encircled by a high wall, with ivy-covered, rectangular gated access alongside the roadway.

Similar to many of the manor-houses in the Alto Minho constructed in the 16th century, the palace of Curutelo combines the symmetry and regularity of the civil architecture associated with the Renaissance, with medieval keep tower, which at the time had a defensive function, symbolizing the nobility and power of property-owners. Its plan focuses on a single-story rectangular section, that includes a central, elevated square tower. The main body of the building is crowned by pyramidal merlons, with gargoyles situated along regular spaces on the facade. In comparison, the frontispiece is austere, with a few regular guillotine-style windows and doors with simple frames.

In the courtyard of the estate is a chapel dedicated to Santo Amaro, with a simple typology similar to the manor-house. It has a simple facade, divided into two registers by friezes, with simple rectangular frame surmounted by window, and accompanied by a truncated, rectangular bell-tower. The interior of this single-nave church includes a high-choir and presbytery in gilded woodwork.
