= Labruja =

- Civil parish
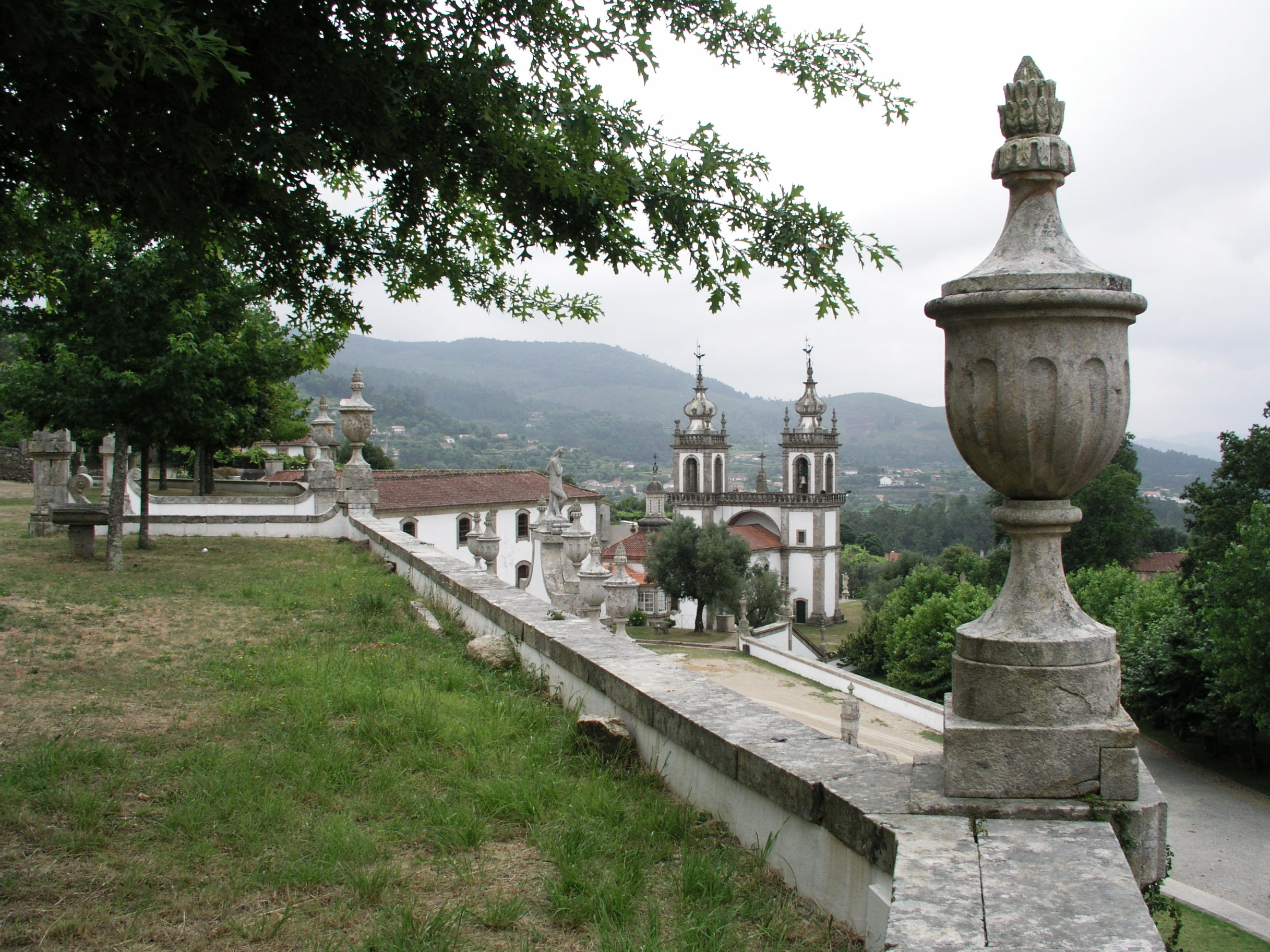
- Church of Nossa Senhora do Socorro

- Location in Portugal
- Coordinates: 41.842°N 8.598°W
- Country: Portugal
- Region: Norte
- Intermunic. comm.: Alto Minho
- District: Viana do Castelo
- Municipality: Ponte de Lima

Area
  - Total: 14.56 km^{2} (5.62 sq mi)

Population (2011)
  - Total: 439
  - Density: 30.2/km^{2} (78.1/sq mi)
- Time zone: UTC+00:00 (WET)
  - Summer (DST): UTC+01:00 (WEST)
- Postal code: 4990
- Area code: 258
- Patron: São Cristóvão
- Website: https://www.jf-labruja.pt

Labruja is a civil parish (Portuguese: freguesia) in the municipality of Ponte de Lima in northern Portugal. The population in 2011 was 439, in an area of 14.56 km².

== History ==
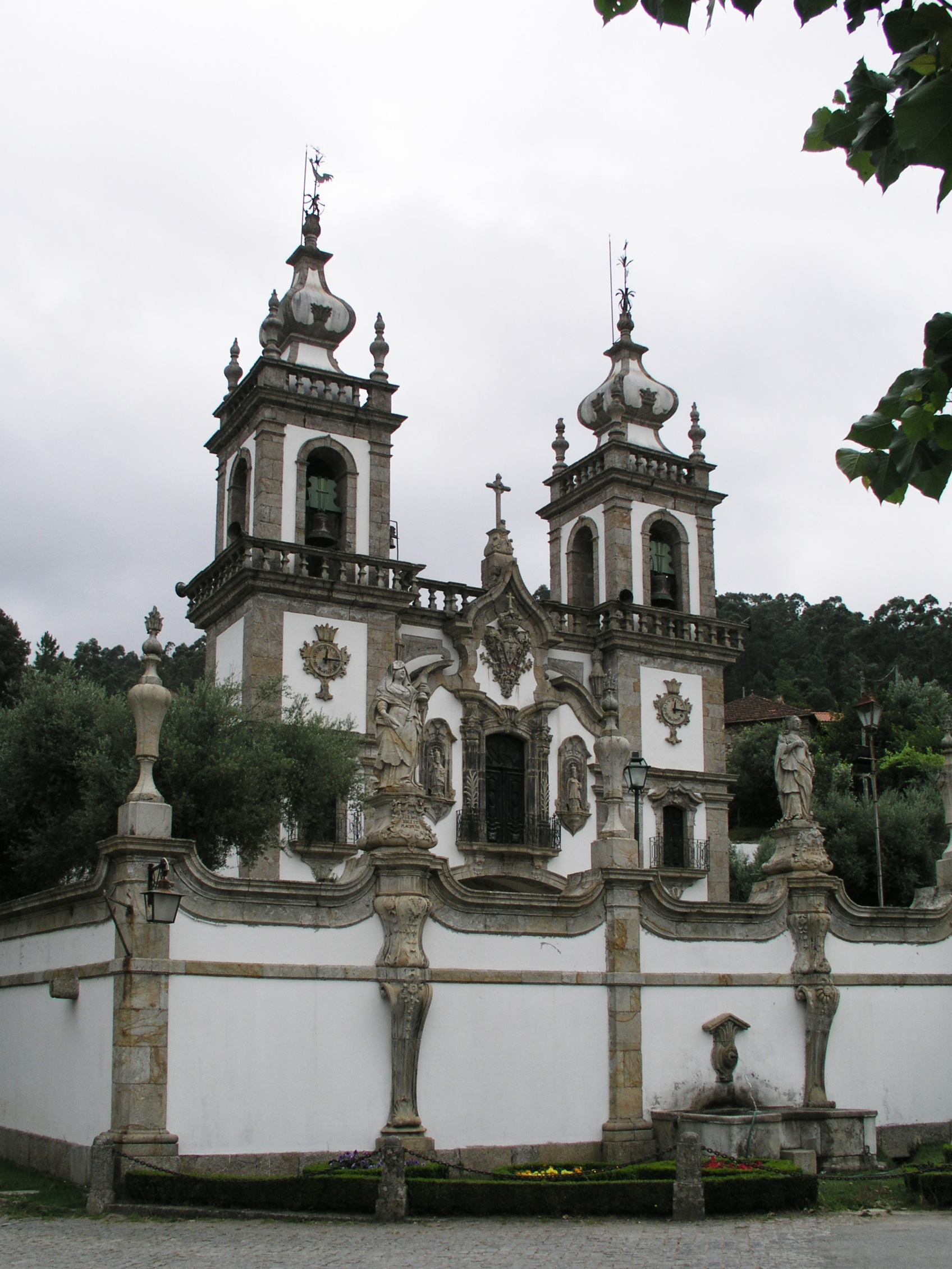
The Church of Our Lord of Socorro (Portuguese: Santuário do Senhor do Socorro)

The name Labruja comes from the Portuguese word laboriosa, after the name of the mountain range where it is located; laboriosa means laborious in English.

The ancient settlement may not have existed during the Roman era, but it was a village during the Goth civilization.

Historically, the settlement grew from the 9th century village, that became a centre of a Benedictine monastery, founded by Hermóigio, bishop of Tui. Labruja was a vicarage of the Sé of Braga, and also, at one time, the archdeaconship of the Sé of Tui. The Benedictine monastery of São Cristóvão de Labruja, was founded by the Bishop of Tui, Hermoígio, who ordered its construction on local lands (Bandeira) under the reign of the monarch Ordoño II of León. This king later donated the monastery to the Sé in Lugo, in 915. In 1125, Teresa transferred this title to the Sé in Tui. During the division of ecclesiastical lands on 1 December 1156, the churches of Cepões, Rendufe and half of Romarigães was transferred to the administration of Tui. In 1242, Lucas, Bishop of Tui, created the archdeaconship of Labruja, with its seat in the Sé and administration at São Cristóvão de Labruja.

During the Inquirições (inventory/inqueries) of 1258, the monastery became part of the Royal Padroado. The Sanctuary of Our Lord of Help/Aid (Portuguese: Santuário do Senhor do Socorro), was the centre of religious pilgrimages during the 13th century, and was remodelled in 1773, in addition to further renovations in successive years. Lubrija was on the road to Santiago de Compostela, along the famous Saint James's Way, crossed by the faithful.

The monastery was closed in 1460, and by 1520, the local census (written by Diogo de Sousa) identified that the monastery was reduced to merely a parochial church.

It was founded after the foral of São Martinho, bestowed by King Manuel I of Portugal on 2 June 1515. In 1546, Archbishop Manuel de Sousa, evaluated the monastery and annex in 70,000 réis. Friar Baltasar Limpo, in 1580, identified Labruja as an ecclesiastical parish, and annexed the community of São Tiago de Romarigães.

== Geography ==
The civil parish is located in the Serra de Labruja, nine kilometres from the municipal seat of Ponte de Lima, occupying one of the largest tracts in the municipality. But regardless, the parish has less than 750 inhabitants interspersed within several localities (with dozens of homes in each), including: Antas, Arco, Bacelos, Balada, Bandeira, Bargo, Bouça, Camboa, Carvalho, Casa Branca, Codeçal, Devesa, Espinheiro, Fijô, Gávia, Igreja, Mota, Outeiro, Pessegueiros, Pedrelo, Pinheiro, Pombinha, Ponte Nova, Quinta, Revolta, Rua, Santana, Soutinho, Torre, Valinhos, Vinhó de Baixo and Vinhó de Cima. Its neighbours include Cunha and Romarigães to the north (in the municipality of Paredes de Coura); Arcozelo to the south; Rendufe, Bárrio and Cepões to the east; and Cabração to the west.

Municipal services are limited in the region: by 2011, canalized water distribution was not yet universal; sewage treatment was non-existent; and the collection of waste only served 80% of the community (twice weekly). Educational services are limited to two primary-level schools (Portuguese: JI de Labruja and EB1 de Soutinho), only one with refectory, while there are no local medical services (healthcare is handled in the municipal seat). Cultural services include a sports complex, an open library and a local community hall (used by local cultural groups for annual events).

== Economy ==
The primary economic activities in this area are subsistence agriculture, farming and bee-keeping, in addition to saw-milling and nascent commercial businesses. There are also artisanl industries such as textiles and embroidery, in addition to woolen quilts, that hark back to the traditional communities that occupied the valley. Other sectors are limited by the municipal plan, a lack of industrial zones, and limited access.

The parish is served by primarily by local roads, as the E1-IP1 (A3 Auto-Estrada Porto-Valença) motorway bypasses the village, and the secondary N201 (while meandering through the parish) is also some distance from the rural community. Public transport is limited to bus service and local taxis.

== Architecture ==
Although limited, the parish attempts to promote a tourist economy, through the preservation of many of its architectural treasures:

=== Civic ===
- Bridge of Arquinho (Portuguese: Ponte do Arquinho), dating to the 13th-14th century, this Romanesque single-arch bridge crosses the Labruga River.
- Pillory of Ponte de Lima (Portuguese: Pelourinho de Ponte de Lima)
- Tower of Paço do Beiral (Portuguese: Torre da Casa do Paço do Beiral)

=== Religious ===
- Church of Senhor do Socorro (English: Our Lord of Help/Aid), which celebrated an annual festival on first Sunday and Saturdays in July; The ample temple and front court, is surrounded by a wall, and accessible from a staircase flanked by angels blowing trumpets. The verandas of balusters are decorated with stone flames, while the staircase is enhanced by allegorical statues of stone, intermingled with vases and flames. The façade of the church is flanked by two bell-towers designed in the Rococo-style. On the cornices are royal arms, while below them and above the main doorway is a window flanked by niches with the statues of Saint Peter, and presumably Pope Clement XIV. Apart from its ornate 18th century chapel, choir and pulpits in the Neoclassical-style, the interior is simple. Behind the temple is a building used to house pilgrims on their visits to Santiago de Compostela.
- Chapel of São João da Grova (Portuguese: Capela de São João da Grova)
- Chapel of Santa Catarina (Portuguese: Capela de Santa Catarina)
- Chapel of Santa Ana (Portuguese: Capela de Santa Ana)
- Chapel of Nossa Senhora das Neves (Portuguese: Capela de Nossa Senhora das Neves) Cepões
- Chapel of Poça (Portuguese: Capela da Poça)
- Chapel of São Domingos (Portuguese: Capela de São Domingos)
- Church of São Cristóvão (Portuguese: Igreja Paroquial de Labruja/Igreja de São Cristóvão)

Along the route to Santiago do Compostela, there are still vestiges of the rock ovens used by pilgrims to cook goat on the journey.

== Culture ==
Most social events, apart from religious events, are motivated by the cultural groups: the Associação Cultural, Recreativa e Desportiva de Labruja (English: Cultural, Recreational and Sporting Association of Labruja), the Grupo Coral (English: Choral Group) and the Grupo Animador de Labruja.
