= Cossourado e Linhares =

- Civil parish
- Location in Portugal
- Coordinates: 41.924°N 8.637°W
- Country: Portugal
- Region: Norte
- Intermunic. comm.: Alto Minho
- District: Viana do Castelo
- Municipality: Paredes de Coura

Area
  - Total: 9.64 km^{2} (3.72 sq mi)

Population (2011)
  - Total: 517
  - Density: 54/km^{2} (140/sq mi)
- Time zone: UTC+00:00 (WET)
  - Summer (DST): UTC+01:00 (WEST)

Cossourado e Linhares is a civil parish in the municipality of Paredes de Coura, Portugal. It was formed in 2013 by the merger of the former parishes Cossourado and Linhares. The population in 2011 was 517, in an area of 9.64 km^{2}.
