= Formariz e Ferreira =

- Civil parish
- Location in Portugal
- Coordinates: 41.922°N 8.579°W
- Country: Portugal
- Region: Norte
- Intermunic. comm.: Alto Minho
- District: Viana do Castelo
- Municipality: Paredes de Coura

Area
  - Total: 19.54 km^{2} (7.54 sq mi)

Population (2011)
  - Total: 998
  - Density: 51/km^{2} (130/sq mi)
- Time zone: UTC+00:00 (WET)
  - Summer (DST): UTC+01:00 (WEST)

Formariz e Ferreira is a civil parish in the municipality of Paredes de Coura, Portugal. It was formed in 2013 by the merger of the former parishes Formariz and Ferreira. The population in 2011 was 998, in an area of 19.54 km^{2}.
