= Cristelo =

Cristelo may refer to:

Places in Portugal

- Cristelo (Barcelos), a parish in the municipality of Barcelos
- Cristelo (Caminha), a parish in the municipality of Caminha
- Cristelo (Paredes), a parish in the municipality of Paredes
- Cristelo (Paredes de Coura), a parish in the municipality of Paredes de Coura
