= Coura =

Coura may refer to the following places in Portugal:

- Coura (Armamar), a civil parish in the municipality of Armamar
- Coura (Paredes de Coura), a civil parish in the municipality of Paredes de Coura
