= Romarigães =

- Civil parish
- Location in Portugal
- Coordinates: 41.869°N 8.635°W
- Country: Portugal
- Region: Norte
- Intermunic. comm.: Alto Minho
- District: Viana do Castelo
- Municipality: Paredes de Coura

Area
  - Total: 7.13 km^{2} (2.75 sq mi)

Population (2011)
  - Total: 224
  - Density: 31/km^{2} (81/sq mi)
- Time zone: UTC+00:00 (WET)
  - Summer (DST): UTC+01:00 (WEST)
- Website: http://www.jf-romarigaes.com

Romarigães is a civil parish in the municipality of Paredes de Coura, Portugal. The population in 2021 was 224, in an area of 7.13 km^{2}.

== Sites of interest ==
- Casa Grande de Romarigães
- Castro do Coto de Ouro
