= Agualonga =

- Civil parish
- Location in Portugal
- Coordinates: 41.886°N 8.615°W
- Country: Portugal
- Region: Norte
- Intermunic. comm.: Alto Minho
- District: Viana do Castelo
- Municipality: Paredes de Coura

Area
  - Total: 4.14 km^{2} (1.60 sq mi)

Population (2021)
  - Total: 263
  - Density: 64/km^{2} (160/sq mi)
- Time zone: UTC+00:00 (WET)
  - Summer (DST): UTC+01:00 (WEST)

Agualonga is a Portuguese civil parish in the municipality of Paredes de Coura, a parish with an area of 4.14 km² and 263 inhabitants in the 2021 census having, therefore, a population density of 63.5 inhabitants/km².

== Demographics ==
Population of the Parish of Agualonga
Year	Pop.	±%
1864	536	—
1878	500	−6.7%
1890	474	−5.2%
1900	481	+1.5%
1911	506	+5.2%
1920	491	−3.0%
1930	582	+18.5%
1940	584	+0.3%
1950	589	+0.9%
1960	544	−7.6%
1970	534	−1.8%
1981	410	−23.2%
1991	335	−18.3%
2001	284	−15.2%
2011	295	+3.9%
2021	263	−10.8%
