= Infesta =

Infesta may refer to the following places in Portugal:

- Infesta (Celorico de Basto), a parish in the municipality of Celorico de Basto
- Infesta (Paredes de Coura), a parish in the municipality of Paredes de Coura
- Infesta (São Simão de Gouveia), a subdivision of the parish of São Simão de Gouveia in the municipality of Amarante
- São Mamede de Infesta, a city in Matosinhos municipality
