= Labrujó, Rendufe e Vilar do Monte =

- Civil parish
- Location in Portugal
- Coordinates: 41.854°N 8.542°W
- Country: Portugal
- Region: Norte
- Intermunic. comm.: Alto Minho
- District: Viana do Castelo
- Municipality: Ponte de Lima

Area
  - Total: 11.26 km^{2} (4.35 sq mi)

Population (2011)
  - Total: 417
  - Density: 37.0/km^{2} (95.9/sq mi)
- Time zone: UTC+00:00 (WET)
  - Summer (DST): UTC+01:00 (WEST)

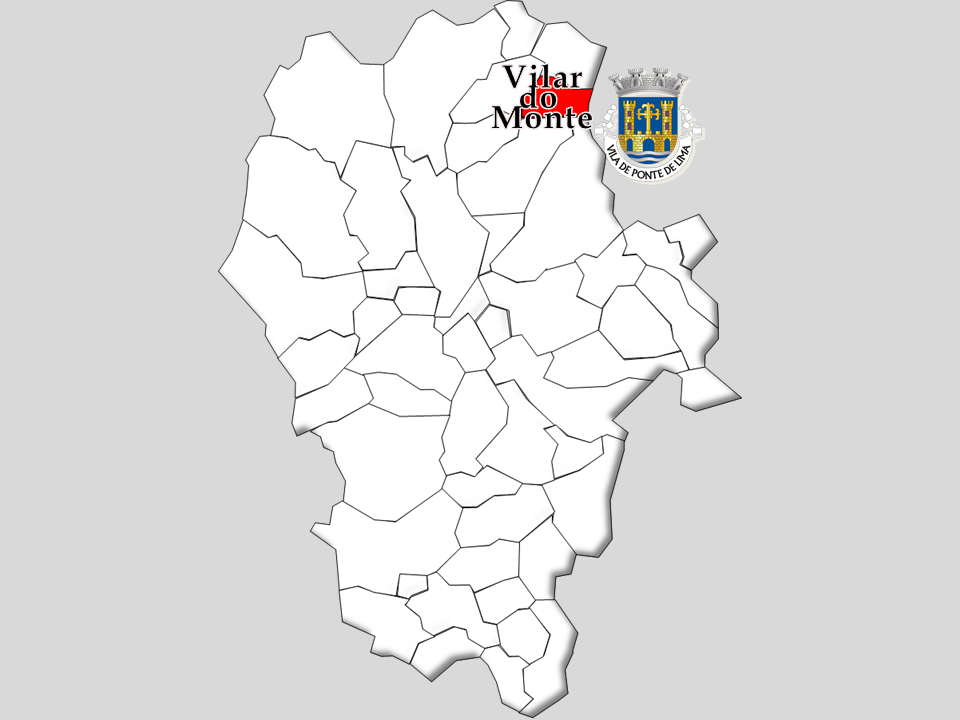

Labrujó, Rendufe e Vilar do Monte is a civil parish in the municipality of Ponte de Lima, Portugal. It was formed in 2013 by the merger of the former parishes Labrujó, Rendufe and Vilar do Monte. The population in 2011 was 417, in an area of 11.26 km^{2}.
