= Paredes de Coura e Resende =

- Civil parish
- Location in Portugal
- Coordinates: 41.911°N 8.560°W
- Country: Portugal
- Region: Norte
- Intermunic. comm.: Alto Minho
- District: Viana do Castelo
- Municipality: Paredes de Coura

Area
  - Total: 5.84 km^{2} (2.25 sq mi)

Population (2011)
  - Total: 2,099
  - Density: 360/km^{2} (930/sq mi)
- Time zone: UTC+00:00 (WET)
  - Summer (DST): UTC+01:00 (WEST)

Paredes de Coura e Resende is a civil parish in the municipality of Paredes de Coura, Portugal. It was formed in 2013 by the merger of the former parishes Paredes de Coura and Resende. The population in 2011 was 2,099, in an area of 5.84 km².

== Sites of interests ==
- The old prison of Paredes de Coura
- The pelourinho of Paredes de Coura
