= Mozelos =

Mozelos may refer to the following places in Portugal:

- Mozelos (Paredes de Coura), a parish in the municipality of Paredes de Coura
- Mozelos (Santa Maria da Feira), a parish in the municipality of Santa Maria da Feira
