= Insalde e Porreiras =

Insald Porreiras
- Civil parish
- Location in Portugal
- Coordinates: 41.949°N 8.533°W
- Country: Portugal
- Region: Norte
- Intermunic. comm.: Alto Minho
- District: Viana do Castelo
- Municipality: Paredes de Coura

Area
  - Total: 17.59 km^{2} (6.79 sq mi)

Population (2011)
  - Total: 459
  - Density: 26/km^{2} (68/sq mi)
- Time zone: UTC+00:00 (WET)
  - Summer (DST): UTC+01:00 (WEST)

Insalde e Porreiras is a civil parish in the municipality of Paredes de Coura, Portugal. It was formed in 2013, by the merger of the former parishes Insalde and Porreiras. The population in 2011 was 459, in an area of 17.59 km^{2}.
