= Diogo Bernardes Theatre =

- Teatro Diogo Bernardes
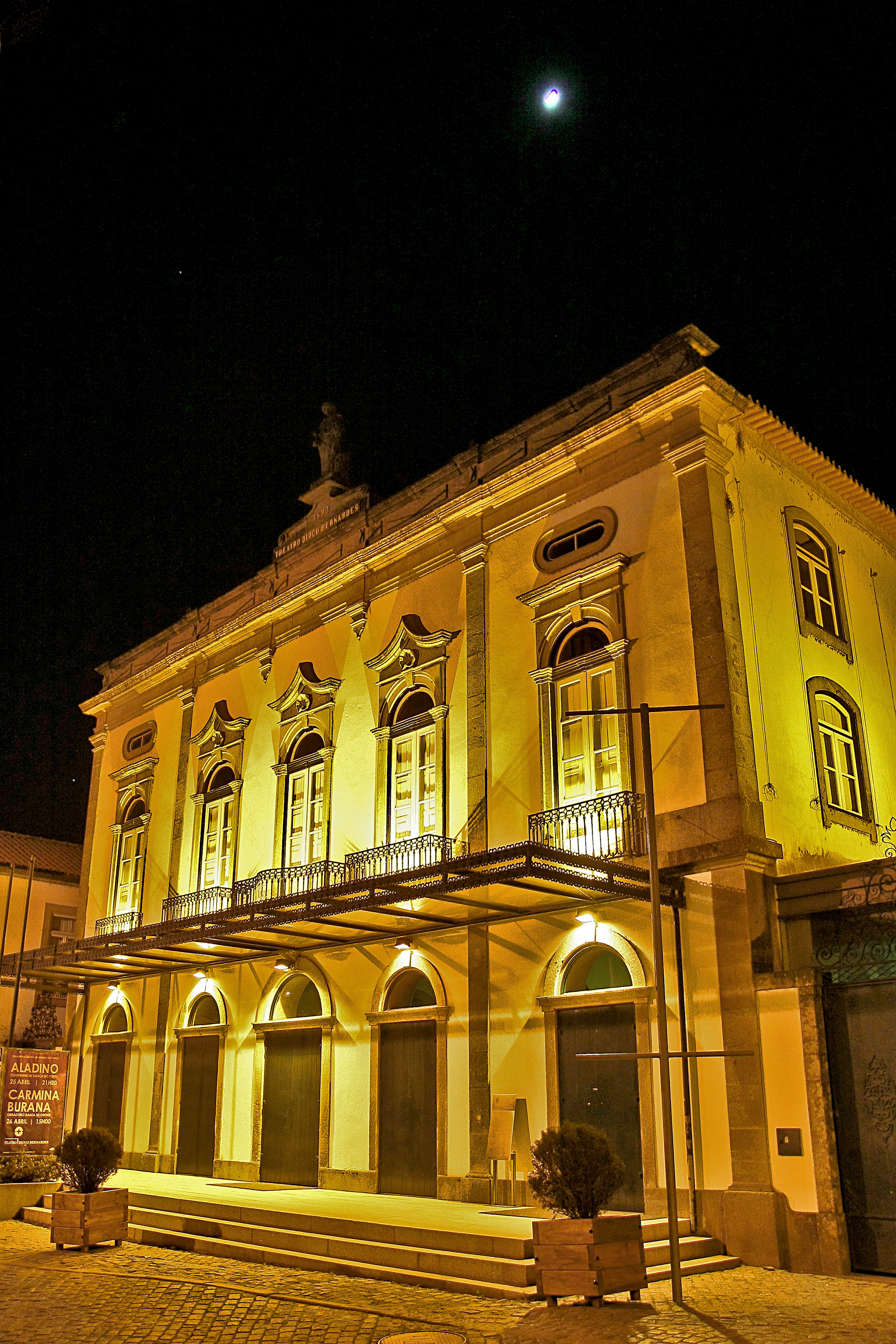
- A picture of Diogo Bernardes Theatre
- Interactive map of the Diogo Bernardes Theatre area

General information
- Type: Theatre
- Architectural style: Italianate
- Location: Ponte de Lima, Portugal
- Coordinates: 41°45′53.9″N 8°35′11.8″W
- Opened: 20th century
- Owner: Portuguese Republic

Technical details
- Material: Concrete

Design and construction
- Architects: António Adelino de Magalhães Coutinho

The Diogo Bernardes Theatre (Portuguese: Teatro Diogo Bernardes) is a theatre in the civil parish of Arca e Ponte de Lima, in the municipality of Ponte de Lima, in the Portuguese district of Viana do Castelo.

== History ==
On 19 February 1893, the theatre commission, that included João Rodrigues de Morais, Francisco António da Cunha Magalhães and Dr. António Inácio Pereira de Freitas, decided to acquire a plot of land, that was formerly occupied by the former-Convent of Santo António dos Frades Capuchos, an area of 1,500 square metres (16,000 ft^{2}). for 1.200$000 réis.

A year later work began on building the Theatre Diogo Bernardes, a project of architect António Adelino de Magalhães Coutinho, with the stonework completed by António Pereira Correia, the carpentry by José Maria da Cunha and painting by Eduardo Reis.

Inauguration of the theatre occurred on 19 September 1896.

The first presentation of films at the theatre began in 1920.

The building was acquired by the municipal council of Ponta de Lima for 50,000 contos in 1992, following several years of degradation and abandon. In 1996, work to remodel and expansion of the theatre (under architect Luís Faro Viana), a project financed partially by the Ministry of Culture for 390,000 contos. Between 1996 and 1999, there were further projects to bring the theatre up to code, that included lighting, roofing, consolidation of walls, installation of fire safety equipment and construction of handicap accessways. At the same time, the stage was expanded, along with the mezzanine and booth seating.

The Teatro Diogo Bernardes became the home of the Ponte de Lima Festival of Opera and Classical Music.

== Architecture ==
The theatre is flanked and integrated into the centre of the town in an area of paved stonework and granite structure, behind the Church of Santo António dos Capuchos, near the Lima River and along the Avenida dos Plátanos. The principal facade is preceded by a platform of granite slabs accessible by three stairs, and flanked by two iron gates between granite pilasters.

The longitudinal plan is composed of two rectangular wings, with one higher than the other, with an L-shaped section addorsed in the northeast and northwest, covered in differentiated tiles and metal sheeting. The facades are decorated and painted white, encircled by salient cornice. On the southeast facade it is crowned by a cornice with geometric motifs in relief and decorated by statute of Melpômene over acrotary, with the inscription: 1893 / THEATRO DIOGO BERNARDES. This facade includes three sections, structured by overlapping pilasters, with the central three sections with archway over pilasters with cornice. It forms a flag and window over pilasters, decorated with curvilinear frontispiece with tympanium. The lateral sections with similar door frame and window, also over pilasters is decorated in cornice and ovular oculus. Over the doorways to the entrance is a window and iron grating, with metallic mantle in geometric decoration. The lateral facades, which continues the same motifs, are marked by an elevated tower structure, and includes rounded doorways with windows. The principal facade, which is partially covered, in the northeast by annex, includes two storeys with windows and decorated with plaques of granite along the foundations. Below this is an iron gateway, with access to the patio of the warehouse. The rear facade with small gabled window is reinforced by a counterweight system that consisted of large metal beams and concrete.

=== Interior ===
The interior of the structure includes two large atriums, decorated and painted white, with mosaic ceramic pavements forming an encased motif with entranceway presenting two allusive tile panels, recovered from the original construction. The atriums had two large rounded doors with windows that connect them to the spaces, backstage, ticket office, seating, and cafeteria on the first floor, in addition to dressing rooms. Following a wood staircase to the second floor provides accesses to balcony and mezzanine, accessed by corridors of plastered white walls. The main auditorium, with a horseshoe plan, is surrounded by three floors of balconies, in a bow shape with carved motifs and wooden curved guardrails. It is covered by a domed stucco roof, with a central carton, circular, ornamented, laced with phytomorphic themes.
