= Alcaria (Porto de Mós) =

- Civil parish
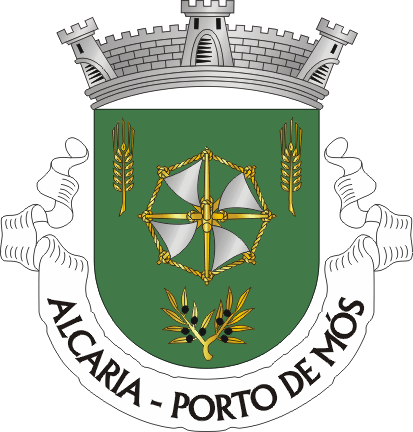
- Coat of arms

- Location in Portugal
- Coordinates: 39°34′18″N 8°47′3″W
- Country: Portugal
- Region: Centro
- Intermunic. comm.: Região de Leiria
- District: Leiria
- Municipality: Porto de Mós
- Disbanded: 28 January 2013

Area
  - Total: 14.15 km^{2} (5.46 sq mi)

Population (2011)
  - Total: 244
  - Density: 17/km^{2} (45/sq mi)
- Time zone: UTC+00:00 (WET)
  - Summer (DST): UTC+01:00 (WEST)

Alcaria is a former civil parish in the municipality of Porto de Mós, Portugal. The population in 2011 was 244, in an area of 14.15 km^{2}. On 28 January 2013 it merged with Alvados to form Alvados e Alcaria.

Population of the civil parish of Alcaria (1864–2011)
Year	Pop.	±%
1864	404	—
1878	438	+8.4%
1890	481	+9.8%
1900	554	+15.2%
1911	556	+0.4%
1920	543	−2.3%
1930	520	−4.2%
1940	569	+9.4%
1950	492	−13.5%
1960	389	−20.9%
1970	293	−24.7%
1981	319	+8.9%
1991	298	−6.6%
2001	256	−14.1%
2011	244	−4.7%
