= Padornelo (Galicia) =

Village in Galicia, Spain

Coordinates: 42.712°N 7.123°W

for other places called Padornelo, see Padornelo

Padornelo is a village on the Way of St. James in Pedrafita do Cebreiro in the Province of Lugo, Galicia, Spain.

In the Middle Ages Padornelo had a hostel for pilgrims next to the church of St Mary Magdalene, which is no longer extant. A graveyard now occupies the site.

The dedication of the parish church of San Xoan is reminiscent of the Hospitallers (Knights of St John).
