= Padornelo =

Padornelo may refer to the following places:

== Portugal ==
- Padornelo (Portugal)

== Spain ==
- Padornelo (Castile and León), in the municipality of Lubián
- Padornelo (Galicia), in the municipality of Pedrafita do Cebreiro
