= Padornelo (Castile and León) =

Coordinates: 42.7119°N 7.1228°W

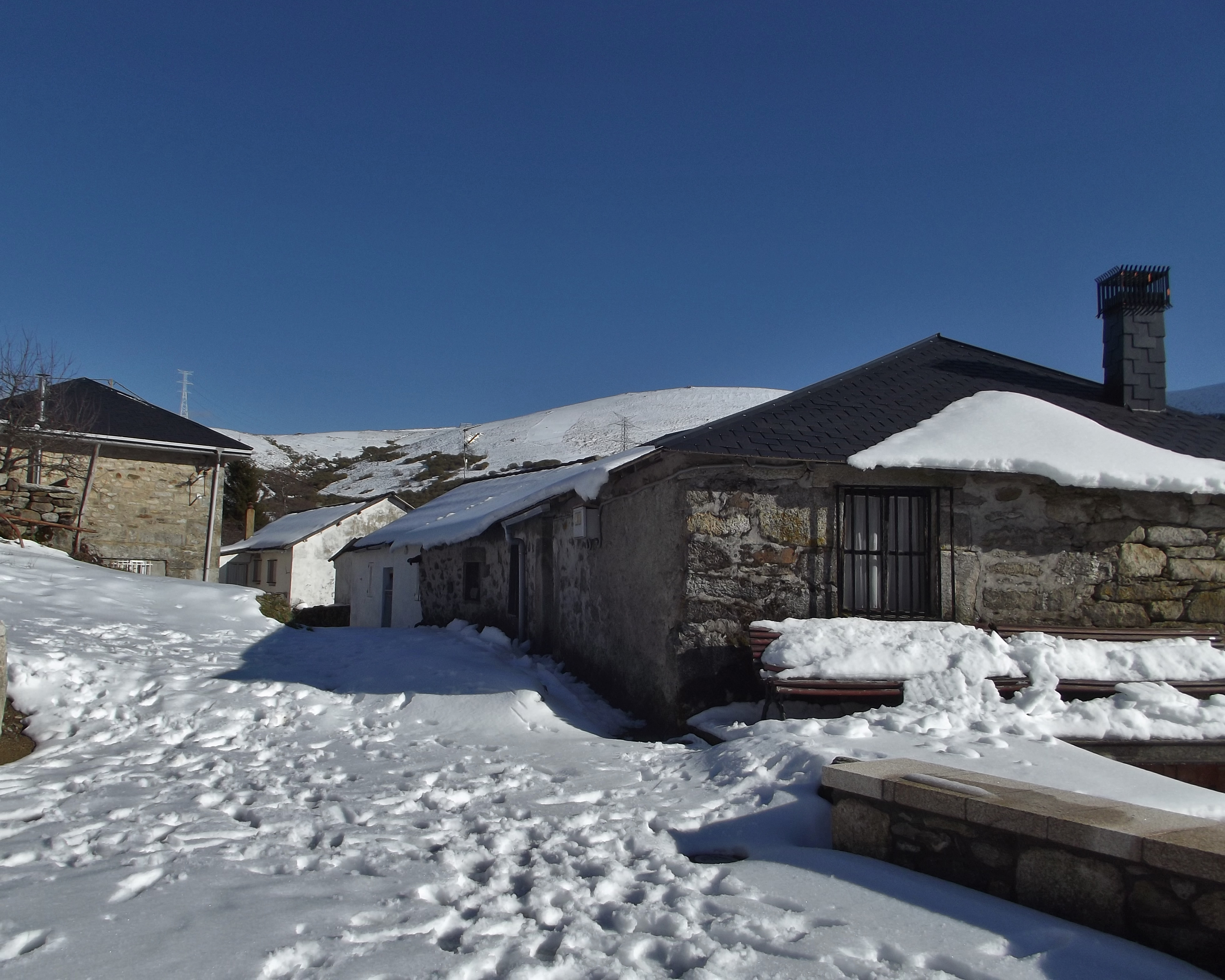

for other places called Padornelo, see Padornelo

Padornelo is a Spanish parish located in the municipality of Lubián in the region of Sanabria, Castile and León. It is located at a height of 1260 meters.
