= Alvados =

- Civil parish
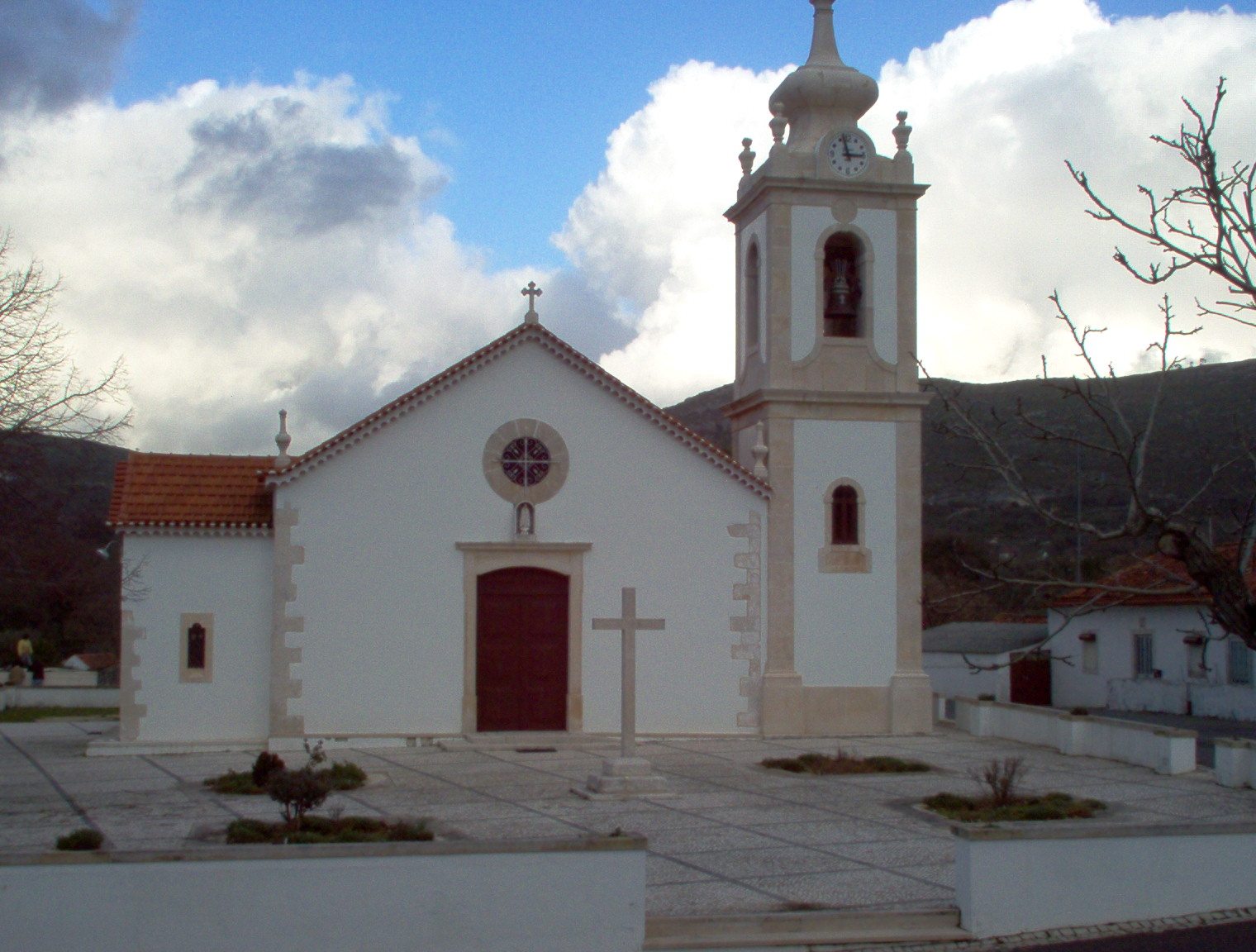
- The Church of Our Lady of Consolation in Alvados (2009)

- Location in Portugal
- Coordinates: 39°32′57″N 8°46′8″W
- Country: Portugal
- Region: Centro
- Intermunic. comm.: Região de Leiria
- District: Leiria
- Municipality: Porto de Mós
- Disbanded: 28 January 2013

Area
  - Total: 10.3 km^{2} (4.0 sq mi)

Population (2011)
  - Total: 497
  - Density: 48.3/km^{2} (125/sq mi)
- Time zone: UTC+00:00 (WET)
  - Summer (DST): UTC+01:00 (WEST)
- Patron: Our Lady of Consolation

Alvados is a former civil parish in the municipality of Porto de Mós, Portugal. The population in 2011 was 497, in an area of 10.3 km^{2}. On 28 January 2013 it merged with Alcaria to form Alvados e Alcaria. It's known for its grottoes Grutas de Alvados and Grutas de Santo António (discovered in 1964 and 1955 respectively).

Population of the civil parish of Alvados (1864–2011)
Year	Pop.	±%
1864	1,154	—
1878	1,214	+5.2%
1890	1,276	+5.1%
1900	1,443	+13.1%
1911	1,476	+2.3%
1920	1,539	+4.3%
1930	1,712	+11.2%
1940	984	−42.5%
1950	843	−14.3%
1960	761	−9.7%
1970	572	−24.8%
1981	567	−0.9%
1991	554	−2.3%
2001	558	+0.7%
2011	497	−10.9%
