= Redemptus of the Cross =

Portuguese lay brother (1598–1638)

Blessed Redemptus of the Cross OCD
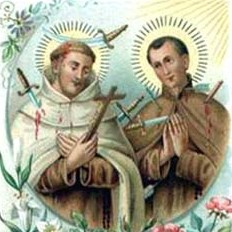
- A devotional image of the Blesseds Redemptus and Denis (Redemptus on the right)

Martyr
- Born: 15 March 1598 in Paredes de Coura, Portugal
- Died: 27 November 1638 (aged 40); Aceh, Indonesia
- Venerated in: Roman Catholic Church
- Beatified: 10 June 1900 by Pope Leo XIII
- Feast: 29 November

Redemptus of the Cross, OCD (also Redemptorus of the Cross; 15 March 1598 – 27 November 1638) was a Portuguese Carmelite lay brother. He was put to death, along with other members of a group sent to Aceh by Portuguese authorities.

== Life ==
Redemptus was born Tomás Rodrigues da Cunha in Paredes de Coura, Portugal on 15 March 1598. He first served as a soldier in the Portuguese army in India, where he joined the Carmelites in Goa as a lay brother in 1615, taking the name Redemptus of the Cross.

Redemptus was sent by the superiors of the order to accompany Denis of the Nativity as part of an ambassadorial mission from the Portuguese Empire to the Sultan of Aceh. The mission was led by Dom Francisco Sousa de Castro as ambassador.

Once in Aceh, all the members of the mission were seized and arrested, at the instigation of the Dutch authorities based in Jakarta. They were then subjected to torture, and those members of the mission who refused to deny their faith were executed one by one. The two friars were led to a desolate spot on the seashore, where Redemptus was shot with arrows, after which his throat was slit. Father Denis, a crucifix in his hands, was the last to die, his skull shattered by a blow of a scimitar.

Castro, the ambassador, was the only survivor. He was held in captivity for three years, until his family paid a large ransom for his release.

== Veneration ==
Redemptus of the Cross was beatified on 10 June 1900 by Pope Leo XIII, together with Denis of the Nativity. Their feast is 29 November.
