= ARCD Mendiga =

A.R.C.D. Mendiga
- Full name: Associação Recreativa Cultural e Desportiva da Mendiga
- Short name: MDG
- Founded: March 30, 1980 (45 years ago)
- Ground: Pavilhão Gimnodesportivo ARCD Mendiga
- Capacity: 500 (217 individual seats)
- League: 2ª Divisão Nacional de Futsal
- Website: http://arcd-mendiga.blogspot.pt/

The Associação Recreativa Cultural e Desportiva de Mendiga is a multi-sport club based in Mendiga, Porto de Mos, Portugal.

The club colors are white and black.

The only currently practiced sport is futsal in the ranks of Seniores, Juniores(U-20), Juvenis(U-17), Iniciados(U-15), Infantis(U-15) and Escolinhas(U-11) and is practiced in the sports pavilion of ARCD Mendiga.

The Grande Prémio de Atletismo da Mendiga is held annually, receiving participants from all around the country.

== History ==
The A.R.C.D. Mendiga was founded on March 30, 1980.

Almost from its foundation the club possessed a pavilion that was used to practice futsal, organize dances and events including a 1982 concert by Jafumega

In 1987 the club initiated an annual running event called Grande Prémio de Atletismo da Mendiga with participants from all over the country.

In 2001 it acquired a new sports field to practice sports, that was later covered in 2003, therefore the previous pavilion was changed to hold cultural events and for events such as New Year's Eve parties, regional taverns where you can taste the best food of Mendiga and regional dances.

The Sports Holidays (Férias Desportivas) are held annually for children from 6 to 15 years old.

== Supporters Group ==
On October 17, 2014 a supporter group called MDG Boys came together.

== Sports Anchievements ==
- 2 Championships Division of Honor of AF Leiria (2006/2007 and 2014/2015);
- 1 National Championship Futsal 3rd Division (2012/2013).
