= Francisco de Melo da Gama de Araújo e Azevedo =

Francisco de Melo da Gama de Araújo e Azevedo (May 16, 1773 – January 17, 1859) was a major general of the Portuguese Army and governor of Diu in Portuguese India between March 21, 1821 and January 1840.

== Name variations ==
- Francisco da Silva e Melo da Gama Araújo
- Francisco de Melo da Gama e Araújo
- Use of "Melo", "Mello", "Meló" and "Melô";
- There are multiple variations of "e"; "de" and "da".

== Biography ==
- Últimas Gerações de Entre-Douro e Minho, José de Sousa Machado, editora J. A. Telles da Sylva (Ano: 1931. Ano da Edição: 1989)
- Notícias Históricas de Portugal e Brasil 1751-1800, Manuel Lopes de Almeida, Coimbra Editora 1964
- Revista do Instituto Histórico e Geográfico Brasileiro, Tomo XXI, 1858
- Os Generais do Exército Português, Volume II Tomo I, Coronel António José Pereira da Costa, Biblioteca do Exército, Lisboa 2005
- Nobiliário das Famílias de Portugal, Felgueiras Gayo, editora Carvalhos de Basto, 2ª Edição, Braga 1989

He died on January 17, 1859 in Quinta da Garrida, Parish of St. João da Ribeira Ponte de Lima, Portugal
