= Padornelo (Portugal) =

- Civil parish
- Location in Portugal
- Coordinates: 41.920°N 8.543°W
- Country: Portugal
- Region: Norte
- Intermunic. comm.: Alto Minho
- District: Viana do Castelo
- Municipality: Paredes de Coura

Area
  - Total: 6.66 km^{2} (2.57 sq mi)

Population (2011)
  - Total: 437
  - Density: 66/km^{2} (170/sq mi)
- Time zone: UTC+00:00 (WET)
  - Summer (DST): UTC+01:00 (WEST)

for other places called Padornelo, see Padornelo

Padornelo is a civil parish in the municipality of Paredes de Coura, Portugal. The population in 2011 was 437, in an area of 6.66 km². It includes the settlement of Valinha.
