= Corno do Bico Protected Landscape =

Protected landscape in Portugal

- Paisagem Protegida do Corno do Bico
- IUCN category V (protected landscape/seascape)
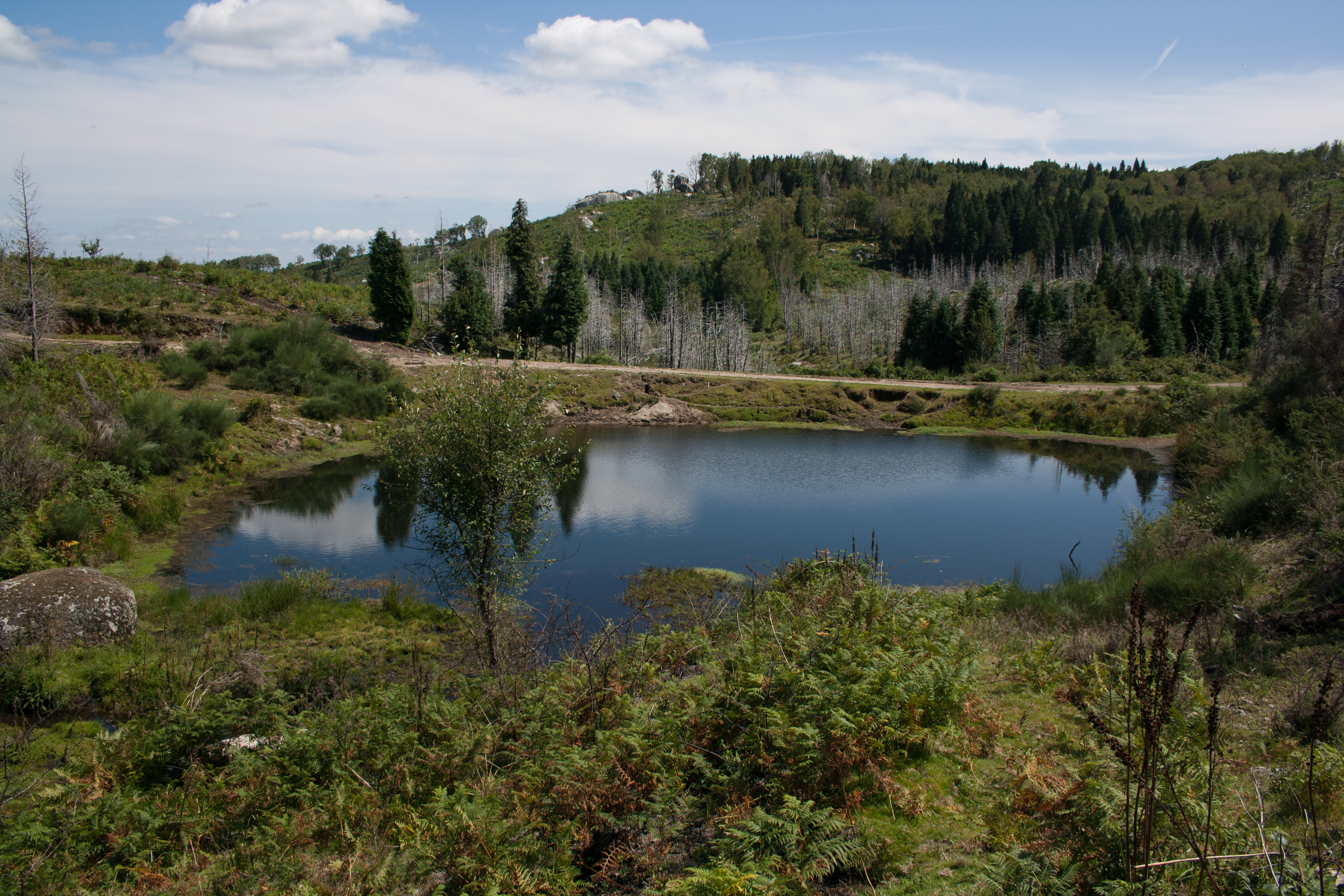

- Location within Portugal
- Location: Paredes de Coura, Portugal
- Coordinates: 41.8869°N 8.52°W
- Area: 2,175 hectares (5,370 acres)
- Established: 20 September 1999

Corno do Bico Protected Landscape is a protected landscape in Portugal, entirely located in Paredes de Coura. It is one of the 30 areas which are officially under protection in the country.

It is composed by wood and grassland pasture systems and well preserved oak forests and it is a habitat to various native and European flora and fauna species like the Iberian wolf, the Pyrenean desman, the European otter, the palmate newt, the genet, the European roe deer and the wild boar.

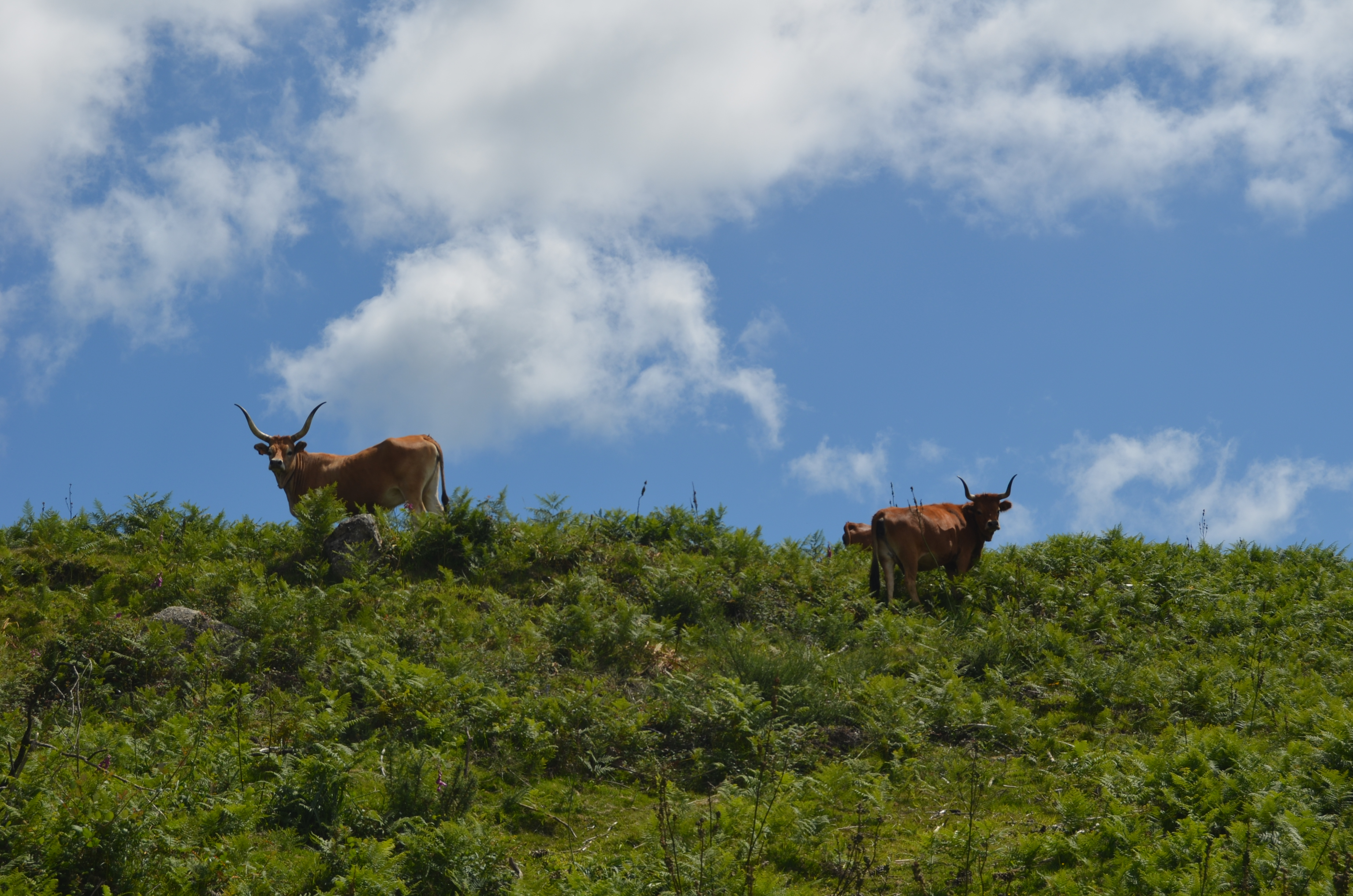
Grazing cattle.
