= Mozelos (Paredes de Coura) =

- Civil parish
- Location in Portugal
- Coordinates: 41.926°N 8.555°W
- Country: Portugal
- Region: Norte
- Intermunic. comm.: Alto Minho
- District: Viana do Castelo
- Municipality: Paredes de Coura

Area
  - Total: 3.36 km^{2} (1.30 sq mi)

Population (2011)
  - Total: 347
  - Density: 100/km^{2} (270/sq mi)
- Time zone: UTC+00:00 (WET)
  - Summer (DST): UTC+01:00 (WEST)

Mozelos is a civil parish in the municipality of Paredes de Coura, Portugal. The population in 2011 was 347, in an area of 3.36 km^{2}.
