= Bico e Cristelo =

- Civil parish
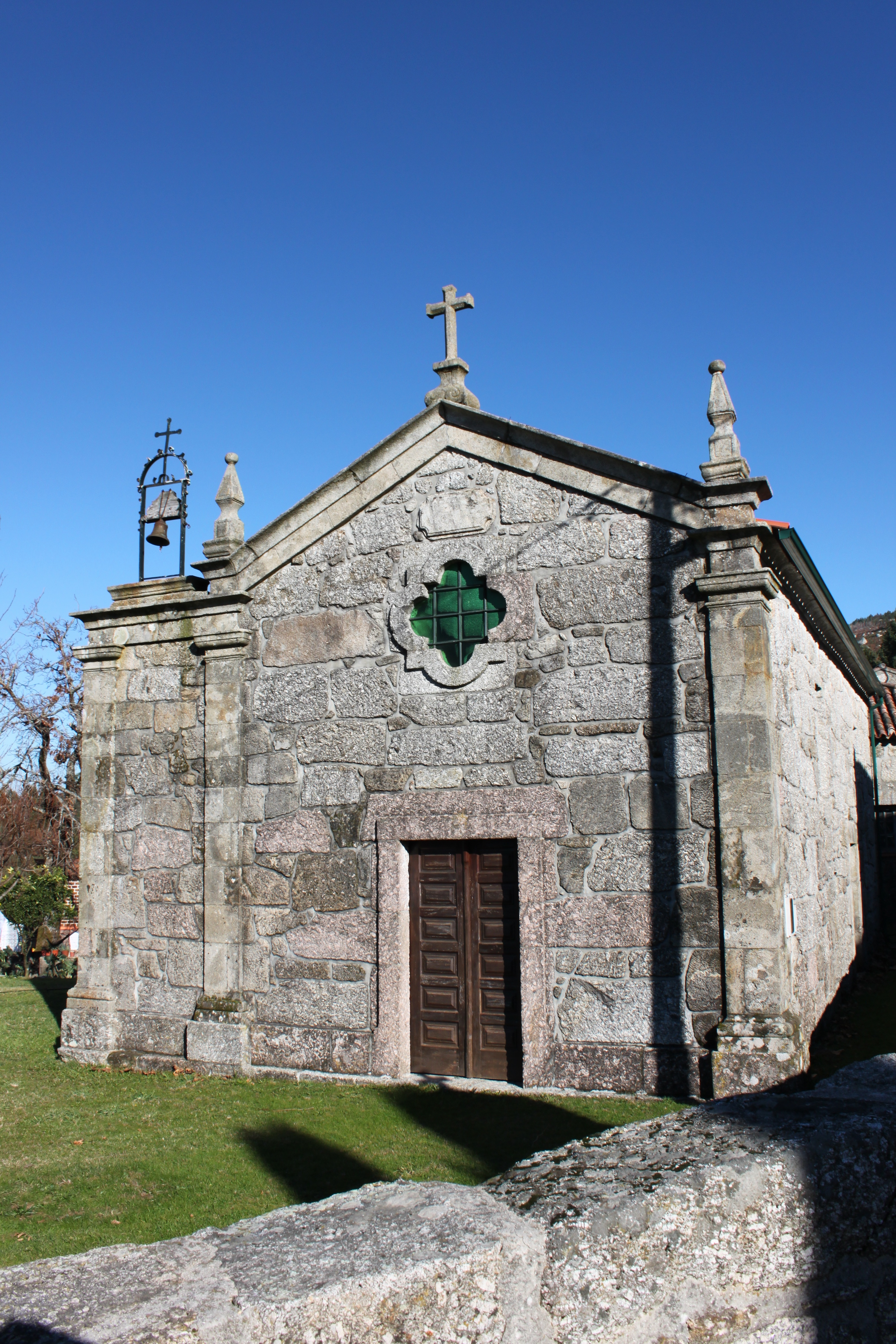

- Location in Portugal
- Coordinates: 41.893°N 8.526°W
- Country: Portugal
- Region: Norte
- Intermunic. comm.: Alto Minho
- District: Viana do Castelo
- Municipality: Paredes de Coura

Area
  - Total: 11.68 km^{2} (4.51 sq mi)

Population (2021)
  - Total: 734
  - Density: 62.8/km^{2} (163/sq mi)
- Time zone: UTC+00:00 (WET)
  - Summer (DST): UTC+01:00 (WEST)

Bico e Cristelo is a Portuguese parish in the municipality of Paredes de Coura, with an area of 11.68 km² and 734 inhabitants in the 2021 census. Its population density is 62.8 inhabitants/km².

== History ==
It was created during the administrative reorganization of 2012/2013 resulting from the aggregation of the former parishes of Bico and Cristelo.

== Demographics ==
The population recorded in the census was:

Population of the parish of Bico
Year	Pop.	±%
2001	475	—
2011	466	−1.9%

Population of the parish of Cristelo
Year	Pop.	±%
2001	352	—
2011	317	−9.9%

Population of the Union of the parishes of Bico and Cristelo
Year	Pop.	±%
2021	734	—
