= Serro Ventoso =

- Civil parish
- Location in Portugal
- Coordinates: 39°33′19″N 8°49′59″W
- Country: Portugal
- Region: Centro
- Intermunic. comm.: Região de Leiria
- District: Leiria
- Municipality: Porto de Mós

Area
  - Total: 34.16 km^{2} (13.19 sq mi)

Population (2021)
  - Total: 892
  - Density: 26.1/km^{2} (67.6/sq mi)
- Time zone: UTC+00:00 (WET)
  - Summer (DST): UTC+01:00 (WEST)

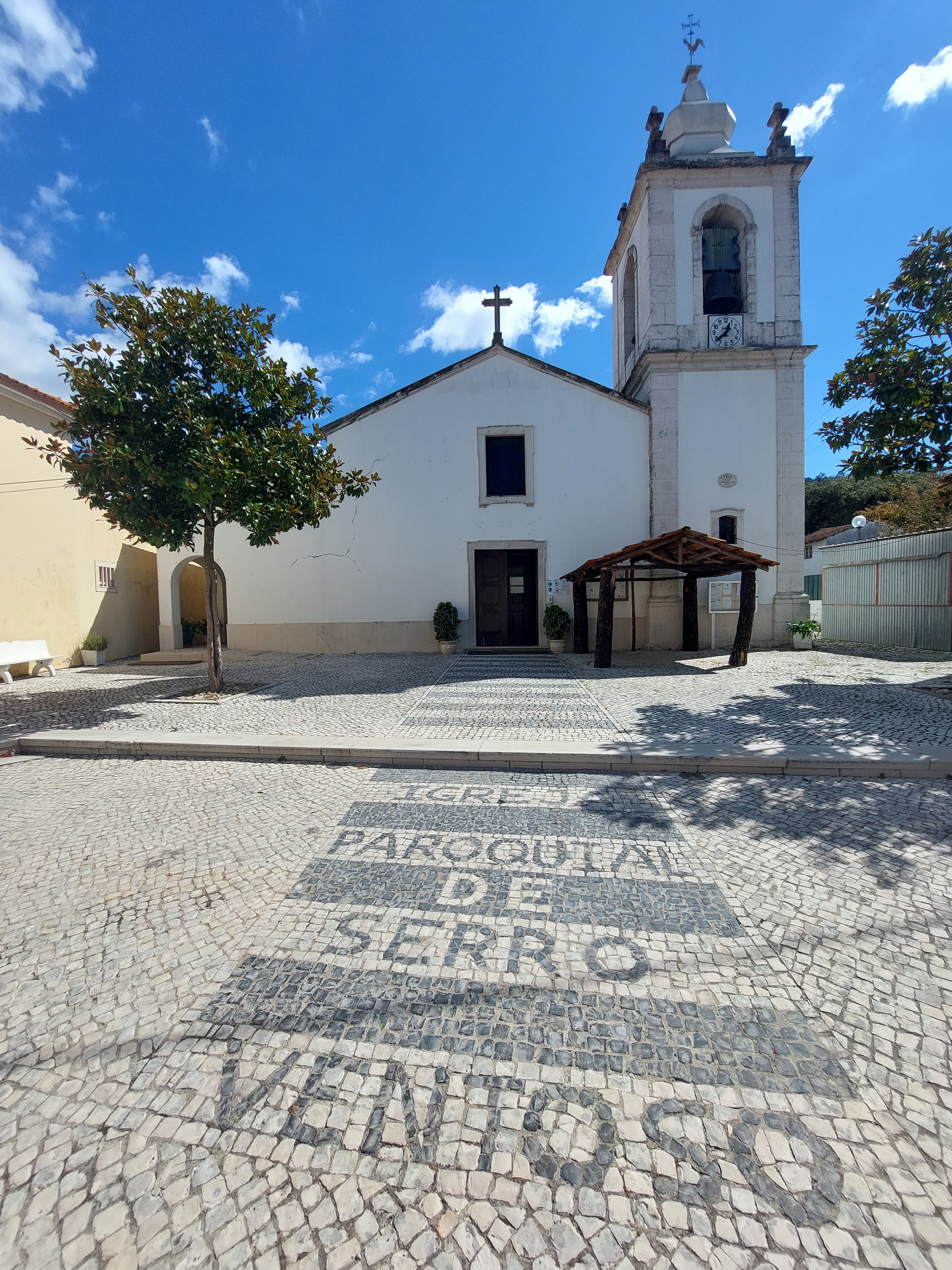
Inscription in the square of the Parish Church of Serro Ventoso

Serro Ventoso is a civil parish in the municipality of Porto de Mós, Portugal. The population in 2021 was 892, in an area of 34.16 km^{2}. It was created in 1933.

Population of the civil parish of Serro Ventoso (1864–2021)
Year	Pop.	±%
1864	784	—
1878	856	+9.2%
1890	834	−2.6%
1900	979	+17.4%
1911	976	−0.3%
1920	1,012	+3.7%
1930	1,254	+23.9%
1940	1,161	−7.4%
1950	1,173	+1.0%
1960	1,170	−0.3%
1970	1,133	−3.2%
1981	1,078	−4.9%
1991	1,032	−4.3%
2001	1,114	+7.9%
2011	1,026	−7.9%
2021	892	−13.1%
