= Pedreiras (Porto de Mós) =

- Civil parish
- Location in Portugal
- Coordinates: 39°35′15″N 8°51′56″W
- Country: Portugal
- Region: Centro
- Intermunic. comm.: Região de Leiria
- District: Leiria
- Municipality: Porto de Mós

Area
  - Total: 11.28 km^{2} (4.36 sq mi)

Population (2021)
  - Total: 2,548
  - Density: 225.9/km^{2} (585.0/sq mi)
- Time zone: UTC+00:00 (WET)
  - Summer (DST): UTC+01:00 (WEST)

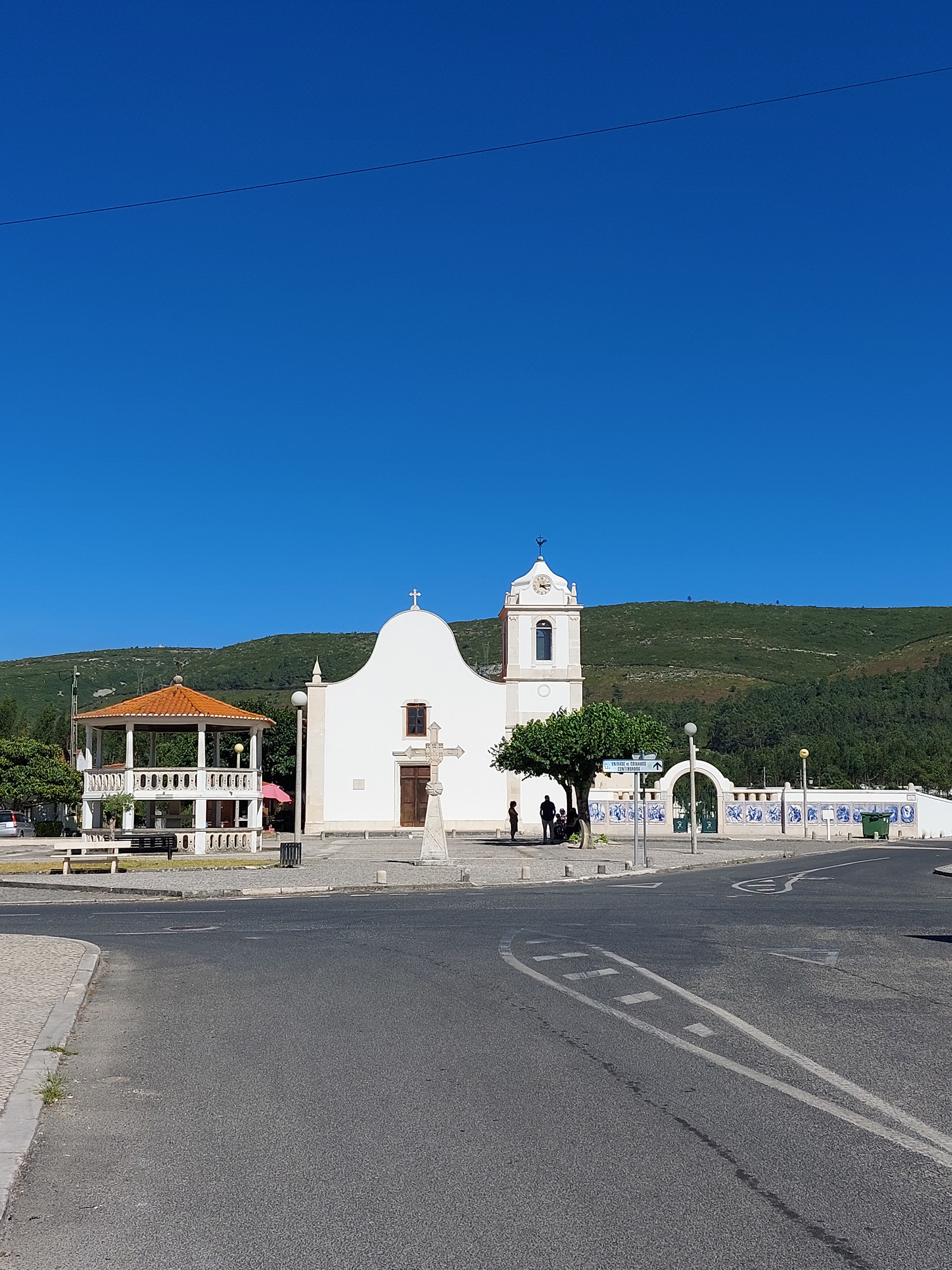
The Old Church of Pedreiras

Pedreiras is a civil parish in the municipality of Porto de Mós, Portugal. The population in 2021 was 2,548, in an area of 11.28 km^{2}. It was created on 19 December, 1924 by law No.1:702.

Population of the civil parish of Pedreiras (1930–2021)
Year	Pop.	±%
1930	1,388	—
1940	1,670	+20.3%
1950	1,829	+9.5%
1960	1,943	+6.2%
1970	1,675	−13.8%
1981	2,445	+46.0%
1991	2,652	+8.5%
2001	2,655	+0.1%
2011	2,705	+1.9%
2021	2,548	−5.8%
