= Mendiga =

- Civil parish
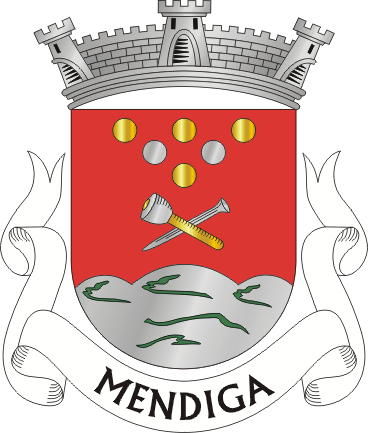
- Coat of arms

- Location in Portugal
- Coordinates: 39°29′51″N 8°50′52″W
- Country: Portugal
- Region: Centro
- Intermunic. comm.: Região de Leiria
- District: Leiria
- Municipality: Porto de Mós
- Disbanded: 28 January 2013

Area
  - Total: 20.01 km^{2} (7.73 sq mi)

Population (2011)
  - Total: 930
  - Density: 46/km^{2} (120/sq mi)
- Time zone: UTC+00:00 (WET)
  - Summer (DST): UTC+01:00 (WEST)

Mendiga is a former civil parish in the municipality of Porto de Mós, Portugal. The population in 2011 was 930, in an area of 20.01 km^{2}. It was first mentioned in 1142 but only became a freguesia shortly after 1525. It is home to the multi-sport club ARCD Mendiga. On 28 January 2013 it merged with Arrimal to form Arrimal e Mendiga.

Population of the civil parish of Mendiga (1864–2011)
Year	Pop.	±%
1864	481	—
1878	541	+12.5%
1890	660	+22.0%
1900	686	+3.9%
1911	782	+14.0%
1920	776	−0.8%
1930	825	+6.3%
1940	961	+16.5%
1950	987	+2.7%
1960	1,019	+3.2%
1970	991	−2.7%
1981	963	−2.8%
1991	938	−2.6%
2001	1,016	+8.3%
2011	930	−8.5%
