= São Bento (Porto de Mós) =

- Civil parish
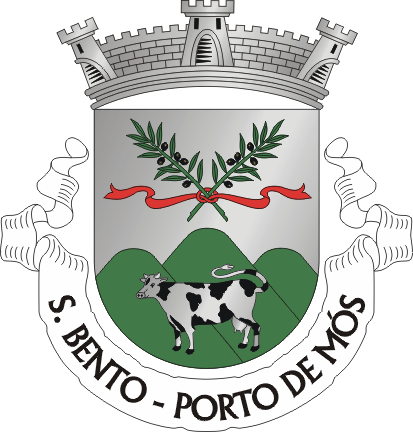
- Coat of arms

- Location in Portugal
- Coordinates: 39°31′35″N 8°47′18″W
- Country: Portugal
- Region: Centro
- Intermunic. comm.: Região de Leiria
- District: Leiria
- Municipality: Porto de Mós

Area
  - Total: 39.70 km^{2} (15.33 sq mi)

Population (2021)
  - Total: 751
  - Density: 19/km^{2} (49/sq mi)
- Time zone: UTC+00:00 (WET)
  - Summer (DST): UTC+01:00 (WEST)
- Website: https://www.freguesiadesaobento.pt/

São Bento is a civil parish in the municipality of Porto de Mós, Portugal. The population in 2021 was 751, in an area of 39.70 km^{2}. It was created on 31 May 1933 by law No.22:602.

Population of the civil parish of São Bento (1940–2021)
Year	Pop.	±%
1940	1,223	—
1950	1,320	+7.9%
1960	1,350	+2.3%
1970	1,153	−14.6%
1981	1,013	−12.1%
1991	957	−5.5%
2001	953	−0.4%
2011	835	−12.4%
2021	751	−10.1%
