= Arrimal =

- Civil parish
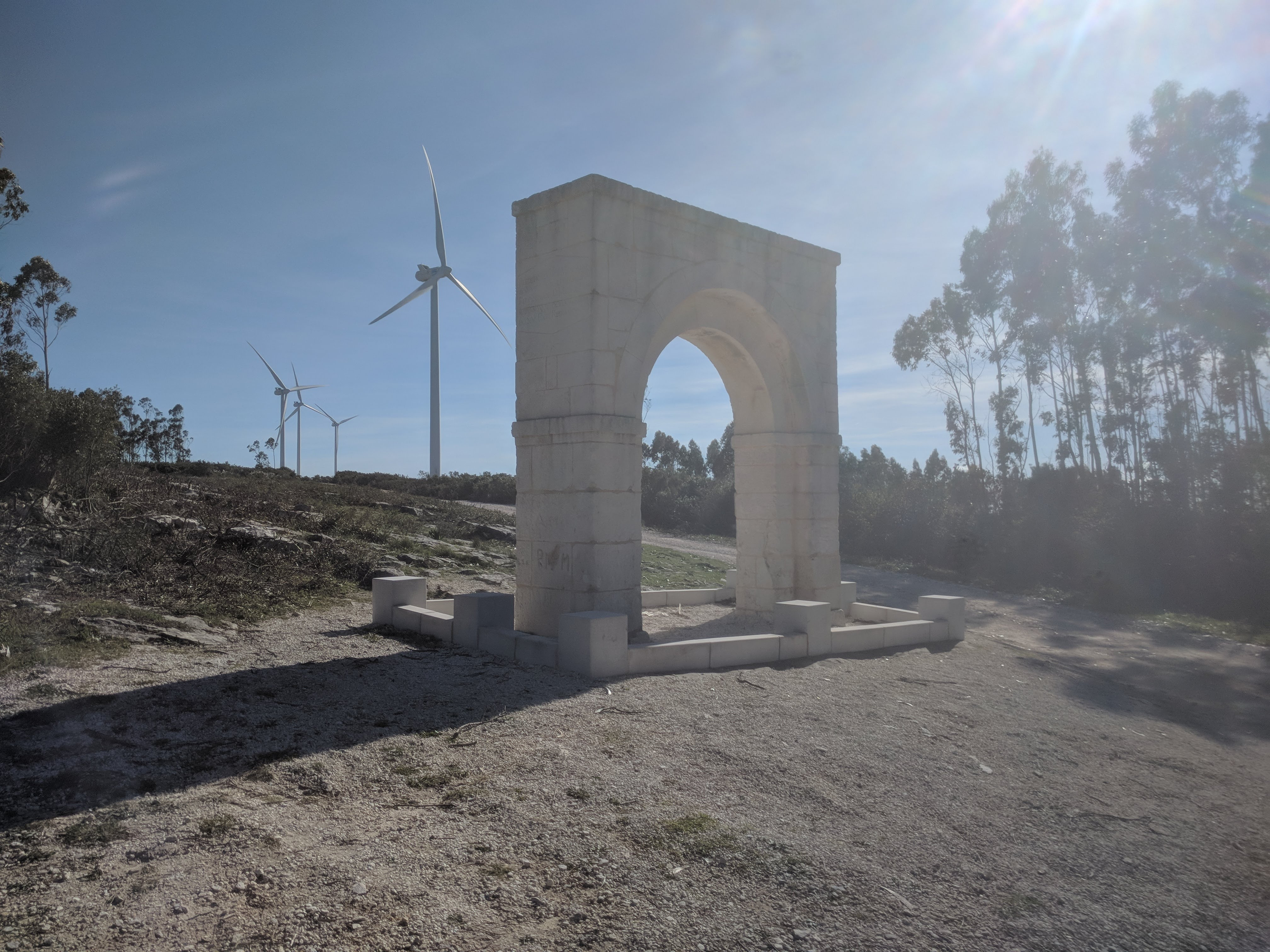
- Arco da Memória (Arch of Memory)

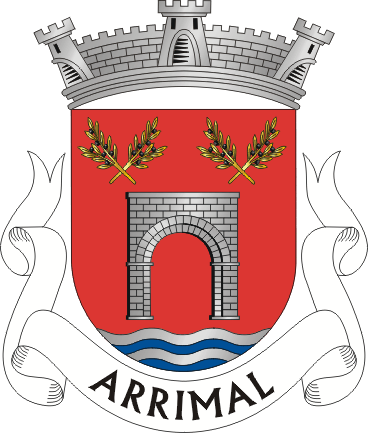
- Coat of arms

- Location in Portugal
- Coordinates: 39°29′21″N 8°52′50″W
- Country: Portugal
- Region: Centro
- Intermunic. comm.: Região de Leiria
- District: Leiria
- Municipality: Porto de Mós
- Disbanded: 28 January 2013

Area
  - Total: 18.57 km^{2} (7.17 sq mi)

Population (2011)
  - Total: 774
  - Density: 41.7/km^{2} (108/sq mi)
- Time zone: UTC+00:00 (WET)
  - Summer (DST): UTC+01:00 (WEST)

Arrimal is a former civil parish in the municipality of Porto de Mós, Portugal. The population in 2011 was 774, in an area of 18.57 km^{2}. On 28 January 2013 it merged with Mendiga to form Arrimal e Mendiga.

Population of the civil parish of Arrimal (1864–2011)
Year	Pop.	±%
1864	611	—
1878	631	+3.3%
1890	678	+7.4%
1900	761	+12.2%
1911	791	+3.9%
1920	744	−5.9%
1930	699	−6.0%
1940	841	+20.3%
1950	866	+3.0%
1960	869	+0.3%
1970	861	−0.9%
1981	853	−0.9%
1991	815	−4.5%
2001	747	−8.3%
2011	774	+3.6%
