= Arrimal e Mendiga =

- Civil parish
- Location in Portugal
- Coordinates: 39°29′51″N 8°50′52″W
- Country: Portugal
- Region: Centro
- Intermunic. comm.: Região de Leiria
- District: Leiria
- Municipality: Porto de Mós

Area
  - Total: 38.58 km^{2} (14.90 sq mi)

Population (2021)
  - Total: 1,575
  - Density: 41/km^{2} (110/sq mi)
- Time zone: UTC+00:00 (WET)
  - Summer (DST): UTC+01:00 (WEST)
- Patron: Saint Anthony of Arrimal and Saint Julian of Mendiga
- Website: www.uf-arrimal-mendiga.pt/index.html

Arrimal e Mendiga (officially União das Freguesias de Arrimal e Mendiga) is a civil parish in the municipality of Porto de Mós, Portugal. The population in 2021 was 1,575, in an area of 38.58 km^{2}. It was formed on 28 January 2013 by the merging of freguesias Arrimal and Mendiga.

It is known for its natural beauty, being the home of the Serras de Aire e Candeeiros Natural Park and two natural lagoons.
