= Friúmes e Paradela =

- Civil parish
- Location in Portugal
- Coordinates: 40.272°N 8.214°W
- Country: Portugal
- Region: Centro
- Intermunic. comm.: Região de Coimbra
- District: Coimbra
- Municipality: Penacova

Area
  - Total: 22.18 km^{2} (8.56 sq mi)

Population (2011)
  - Total: 870
  - Density: 39/km^{2} (100/sq mi)
- Time zone: UTC+00:00 (WET)
  - Summer (DST): UTC+01:00 (WEST)

Friúmes e Paradela is a civil parish in the municipality of Penacova, Portugal. It was formed in 2013 by the merger of the former parishes Friúmes and Paradela. The population in 2011 was 870, in an area of 22.18 km².
