= Juncal =

- Civil parish
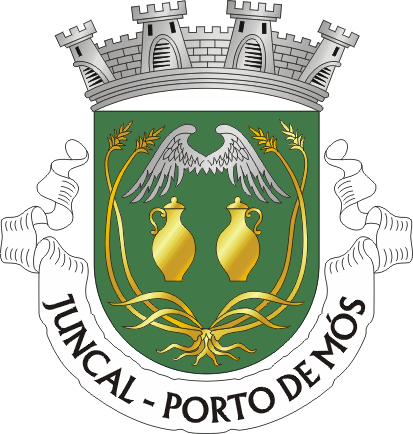
- Coat of arms

- Location in Portugal
- Coordinates: 39.602°N 8.899°W
- Country: Portugal
- Region: Centro
- Intermunic. comm.: Região de Leiria
- District: Leiria
- Municipality: Porto de Mós

Area
  - Total: 26.64 km^{2} (10.29 sq mi)

Population (2011)
  - Total: 3,316
  - Density: 120/km^{2} (320/sq mi)
- Time zone: UTC+00:00 (WET)
  - Summer (DST): UTC+01:00 (WEST)

Juncal is a civil parish in the municipality of Porto de Mós, Portugal, with an area of 26,64 km² and population of 3,197 (2021).

== History ==
In former times, when the land was wetter, the reed plant would have grown abundantly on the land, hence the name "Juncal", as the name in portuguese for reed is "junco". It is also because of the abundance of this plant that one of the most important craft activities was the manufacture of reed baskets and very simple hand-looms. Ceramic baskets and ancient coins discovered in the locality of Andam, a town near by, have proven the presence of Roman civilisations in this area. The original village was located in S. Miguel do Peral (a now abandoned area). As this place was very unsheltered and lacked water, the inhabitants moved to the place where the village now stands. Thus, in 1560 the parish of Juncal was founded, keeping S. Miguel (Saint Michael) as its patron saint. The old chapel located in S. Miguel do Peral gradually fell down, remaining now only the main chapel of the old temple, which is still used once a year, for the Monday mass during the festivities of S. Miguel, during the 3rd weekend of August.

Juncal was elevated to the category of village on July 13, 1990.

== Coat of arms ==
The coat of arms of the parish is composed of a green shield with two golden jars, a pair of silver wings and four golden reed stems "embracing" this set. On top, there is a "crown" with four silver towers and, at the bottom, a white band with the legend "JUNCAL-PORTO DE MÓS". In this way, are represented Juncal's ware (due to the fact that pottery is one of the major activities in this village), the reed that gave the name to the parish and S. Miguel' wings, the patron saint of the parish.

== Patrimony ==
- A Real Fábrica (The Royal Factory): In 1770, a ceramics factory was founded in Juncal. Its founder was José Rodrigues da Silva e Sousa and the factory obtained the title of Royal in September 1784, manufacturing crockery and tiles. The tiles made here are spread all over the country, and there is even a book dedicated to show the most relevant tile panels produced and where they can be found.

Oldest (and most important) monuments in the village:

- Chapel of S. Miguel do Peral
- Parish Church
- Parish Hall
- Private Chapel (built in 1940)
- Cross.

== Equipament ==
Public Services:

- Juncal Parish Care Centre (creche)
- Kindergarten
- Primary School
- Juncal's Educational Institute (Middle and High School)
- Health centre
- Pharmacy
- Juncal's Voluntary Fire Brigade
- Post Office
- Faria Tomaz Foundation (Senior center)
- Juncal Parish Council
- Caixa Agrícola (national bank)
