= Ponte de Lima =

- Municipality
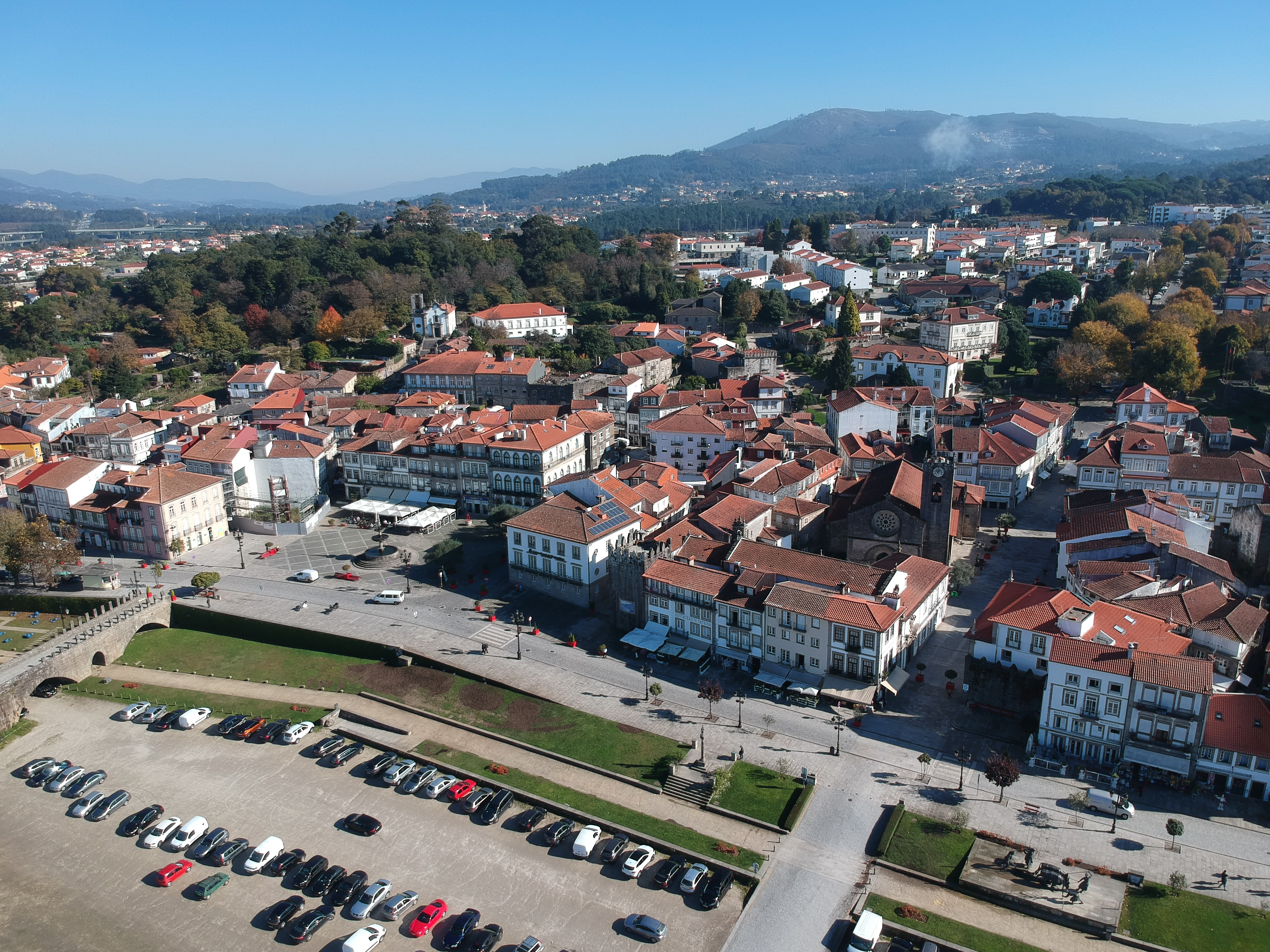
- Aerial view of Ponte de Lima

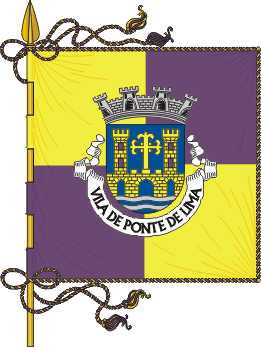
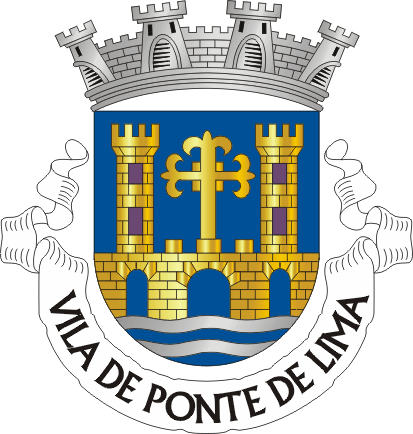
- Flag Coat of arms
- Interactive map of Ponte de Lima
- Coordinates: 41°46′N 8°34′W
- Country: Portugal
- Region: Norte
- Intermunic. comm.: Alto Minho
- District: Viana do Castelo
- Parishes: 39

Government
  - President: Vasco Ferraz

Area
  - Total: 320.25 km^{2} (123.65 sq mi)

Population (2021)
  - Total: 41,164
  - Density: 128.54/km^{2} (332.91/sq mi)
- Time zone: UTC+00:00 (WET)
  - Summer (DST): UTC+01:00 (WEST)
- Website: www.cm-pontedelima.pt

Ponte de Lima (European Portuguese pronunciation: [ˈpõtɨ ðɨ ˈlimɐ]), the oldest vila (chartered town, head of a municipality) in Portugal, is located in the Viana do Castelo District. Situated on the southern bank of the Lima River, it takes its name from the medieval bridge (ponte) that crosses the waterway. In 2021, the municipality had a population of 41,164 within an area of 320.25 square kilometres (123.65 mi^{2}). The town itself has approximately 2,800 inhabitants.

The current mayor is Vasco Ferraz, elected by the People's Party (CDS–PP). As of 2024, Ponte de Lima is one of the six municipalities in Portugal administered by this party. The municipal holiday is celebrated on the Tuesday following the Feiras Novas (New Fairs), a festivity held annually during the second weekend of September.

== History ==
The area of Ponte de Lima has been inhabited since prehistoric times, with archaeological evidence of settlements dating back over 3,000 years. During the Iron Age, numerous castros (hillforts) were established across the modern municipality, with larger examples located at Monte das Santas (now Santa Maria Madalena) near the town center and Monte de Santo Ovídio on the opposite bank of the Lima River.

During the Roman occupation of the Iberian Peninsula, Ponte de Lima gained prominence due to its location along the Via XIX of the Antonine Itinerary, connecting Braga to Santiago de Compostela, Lugo and Astorga. This road, which traversed the region from south to north, was later used during the medieval period and partially coincided with the Camino de Santiago pilgrimage route. Roman infrastructure in the area included a stone bridge over the Lima River, along with two additional bridges in nearby parishes.

Ponte de Lima received its first foral (charter) on March 4, 1125, granted by Theresa, Countess of Portugal and her son, Afonso Henriques. The charter defined the territory, smaller than today's municipality, and provided protection for market participants. It also contains the earliest documented reference to a market in the area. This charter was confirmed by King Afonso II in 1217 and later revised by King Manuel I in 1511.

The Middle Ages marked a period of military significance for Ponte de Lima. Defensive structures, including walls, towers, and the bridge over the Lima River, were constructed. An inscription on the foundation of the Torre de Santo António in 1359 records the beginning of these fortifications under King Pedro I. By 1370, the town’s walls were completed. During the 1383–1385 interregnum, Ponte de Lima supported King John I of Portugal, overcoming local opposition from Lopo Gomes de Lira, who sided with Castile.

In the 15th century, the town transitioned from royal to noble governance. Leonel de Lima, was granted the hereditary title of Alcaide-Mor (chief magistrate) in recognition of his family's support for King John I. His contributions included the construction of the Convent of Santo António dos Capuchos and renovations to the Paço do Marquês. However, his tenure was controversial, with complaints about his conduct and that of his descendants. He was rumored to protect wrongdoers and was accused of unjustly imprisoning and mistreating people in the castle’s prison.

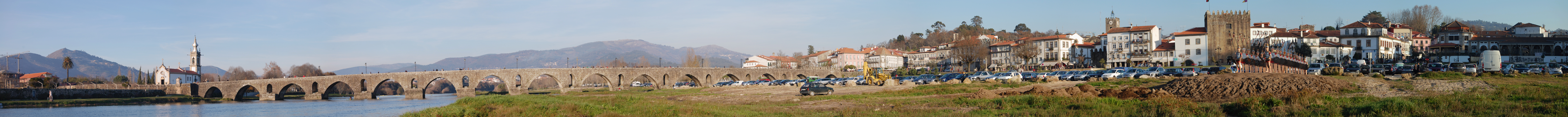
Ponte de Lima

In the 16th century, King Manuel I ordered improvements to the town’s infrastructure, including paving the bridge, adding merlons, and establishing the town jail in one of the defensive towers. This period also saw the founding of the Misericórdia of Ponte de Lima, which provided social assistance, operating a hospital in the town square and managing the former leprosy hospital outside the walls, now the site of the Church of Nossa Senhora da Guia.

Urban development continued in the 17th century with the construction of notable structures such as the Chapel of Nossa Senhora da Penha de França, designed for prisoners to attend mass, and the Hospital of São João de Deus, built for soldiers injured during the Portuguese Restoration War. The Chafariz Nobre, a fountain for potable water, was also completed and later relocated to Largo de Camões in the 20th century.

In the 18th and 19th centuries, the town’s medieval walls and towers fell into disuse and were dismantled, with the stone repurposed for new constructions. This period saw the emergence of Baroque manor houses, reflecting the liberal ideals of the era. Cultural institutions such as the Diogo Bernardes Theater and the Limarense Society, inaugurated in 1868, were established, enriching the town’s cultural life.

The administrative reforms of 1836 expanded the municipality's territory, but the local economy remained rooted in agriculture until well into the 20th century.

== Climate ==
Ponte de Lima has a Mediterranean Climate

Climate data for Ponte de Lima, 1980-1990 normals, 1981-2021 precipitation, altitude: 18 m (59 ft)
Month	Jan	Feb	Mar	Apr	May	Jun	Jul	Aug	Sep	Oct	Nov	Dec	Year
Mean daily maximum °C (°F)	14.4 (57.9)	15.3 (59.5)	17.7 (63.9)	18.5 (65.3)	21.1 (70.0)	25.0 (77.0)	28.0 (82.4)	28.5 (83.3)	27.5 (81.5)	22.1 (71.8)	17.7 (63.9)	15.2 (59.4)	20.9 (69.7)
Daily mean °C (°F)	9.2 (48.6)	10.3 (50.5)	12.1 (53.8)	13.3 (55.9)	15.5 (59.9)	19.2 (66.6)	21.4 (70.5)	21.5 (70.7)	20.6 (69.1)	16.4 (61.5)	12.7 (54.9)	10.3 (50.5)	15.2 (59.4)
Mean daily minimum °C (°F)	4.0 (39.2)	5.4 (41.7)	6.5 (43.7)	8.1 (46.6)	10.0 (50.0)	13.5 (56.3)	14.9 (58.8)	14.5 (58.1)	13.7 (56.7)	10.6 (51.1)	7.7 (45.9)	5.5 (41.9)	9.5 (49.2)
Average precipitation mm (inches)	170.4 (6.71)	134.5 (5.30)	119.3 (4.70)	122.1 (4.81)	95.0 (3.74)	45.7 (1.80)	24.2 (0.95)	35.7 (1.41)	74.9 (2.95)	156.6 (6.17)	175.6 (6.91)	208.9 (8.22)	1,362.9 (53.67)
Source: Portuguese Environment Agency

== Parishes ==
Administratively, the municipality is divided into 39 civil parishes (freguesias):

- Anais
- Arca e Ponte de Lima
- Arcos
- Arcozelo
- Ardegão, Freixo e Mato
- Bárrio e Cepões
- Beiral do Lima
- Bertiandos
- Boalhosa
- Brandara
- Cabaços e Fojo Lobal
- Cabração e Moreira do Lima
- Calheiros
- Calvelo
- Correlhã
- Estorãos
- Facha
- Feitosa
- Fontão
- Fornelos e Queijada
- Friastelas
- Gandra
- Gemieira
- Gondufe
- Labruja
- Labrujó, Rendufe e Vilar do Monte
- Navió e Vitorino dos Piães
- Poiares
- Refóios do Lima
- Ribeira
- Sá
- Santa Comba
- Santa Cruz do Lima
- Santa Maria de Rebordões
- Seara
- Serdedelo
- Souto de Rebordões
- Vale do Neiva
- Vitorino das Donas

== Culture ==
The Feiras Novas (New Fairs) are the municipal festivities of Ponte de Lima, established on May 5, 1826, by King Peter IV of Portugal, who authorized three days of annual fairs in honor of Nossa Senhora das Dores (Our Lady of Sorrows). Held during the second weekend of September, the event has grown steadily over time, attracting thousands of visitors annually. The Feiras Novas have contributed to preserving local heritage and have become a cornerstone of the town's identity.

Every second Monday, Ponte de Lima holds one of the largest country markets in Portugal.

Today, Ponte de Lima is a significant stop on the Central Portuguese branch of the Camino de Santiago pilgrimage route.

The attractive rural area surrounding the town has the largest concentration of baroque manors in Portugal (Aurora, Bertiandos, Brandara, Calheiros, and Pomarchão are among the best known); Some provide tourism accommodation. Ponte de Lima is also known in the region and all across Portugal for its red Vinho Verde wines and its sarrabulho rice.

== Notable people ==
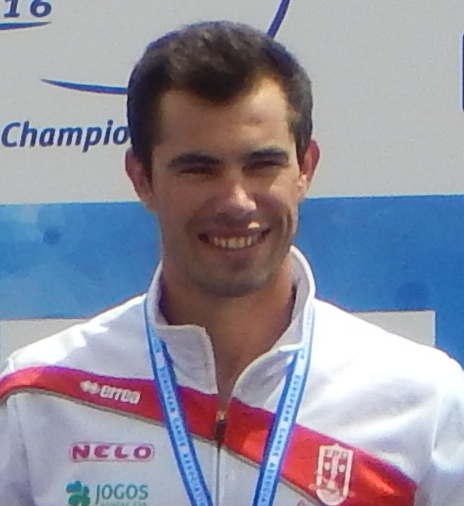
Fernando Pimenta, 2016

- António de Araújo e Azevedo (1754–1817) a statesman, author, amateur botanist and 1st Count of Barca.
- Francisco de Melo da Gama de Araújo e Azevedo (1773 – 1859) a field marshal of the Portuguese Army and governor of Diu in Portuguese India 1821 to 1840.
- Miguel Pereira Forjaz (1769–1827) a general, War Secretary in the Peninsular War and Count of Feira
- Francisco de São Luís (1766–1845) a Cardinal of the Catholic Church, the eighth Patriarch of Lisbon, 1840 to 1845.
- José Norton de Matos (1867–1955) a Portuguese general and politician.
- Fernando Pimenta (born 1989) a sprint canoeist, silver medallist at the 2012 Summer Olympics and bronze medallist at the 2020 Summer Olympics
