= Paredes de Coura =

Town and Municipality in Viana do Castelo, Portugal

- Municipality
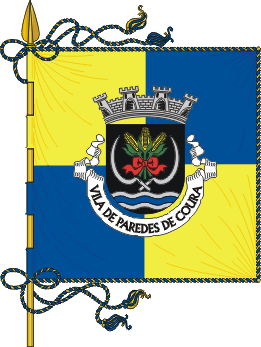
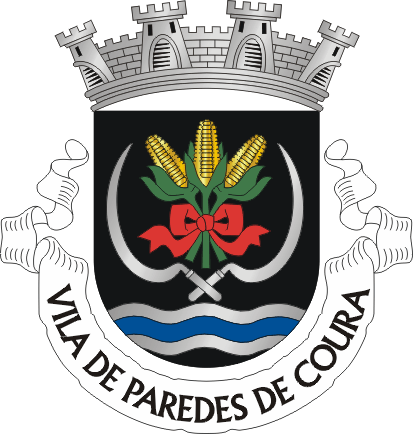
- Flag Coat of arms
- Interactive map of Paredes de coura
- Coordinates: 41°54′N 8°33′W
- Country: Portugal
- Region: Norte
- Intermunic. comm.: Alto Minho
- District: Viana do Castelo
- Parishes: 16

Government
  - President: Vitor Paulo Pereira (PS)

Area
  - Total: 138.19 km^{2} (53.36 sq mi)

Population (2021)
  - Total: 8,632
  - Density: 62.46/km^{2} (161.8/sq mi)
- Time zone: UTC+00:00 (WET)
  - Summer (DST): UTC+01:00 (WEST)
- Website: www.cm-paredes-coura.pt

Paredes de Coura (Portuguese pronunciation: [pɐˈɾeðɨʒ ðɨ ˈkoɾɐ]) is a town and a municipality in the district of Viana do Castelo in northern Portugal. The municipality hosted a population of 8,632 as of 2021, in an area of 138.19 square kilometres (53.36 sq mi). The town is located within the Paredes de Coura e Resende civil parish and had 2,011 inhabitants in the same year.

The present Mayor is Vitor Pereira, elected by the Socialist Party. The municipal holiday is August 10.

== History ==
In 1515, Paredes de Coura received a royal charter (foral) from Manuel I, and it was then called Terra de Coyra. The municipality was also known as Celeiro do Minho (Minho's barn) until the middle of the 20th century.

== Parishes ==
The municipality is composed of 16 parishes:

- Agualonga
- Bico e Cristelo
- Castanheira
- Cossourado e Linhares
- Coura
- Cunha
- Formariz e Ferreira
- Infesta
- Insalde e Porreiras
- Mozelos
- Padornelo
- Parada
- Paredes de Coura e Resende
- Romarigães
- Rubiães
- Vascões

== Paredes de Coura Festival ==
The town is known for hosting the Paredes de Coura Festival, one of Portugal's oldest and most respected music festivals, held annually in August by the banks of the Taboão River. It was founded in 1993 by four local friends with a shared passion for music and a modest budget of 160 contos (approximately €800). Initially called the Festival de Música Moderna Portuguesa de Paredes de Coura, it focused on emerging Portuguese alternative bands, distinguishing itself from the mainstream pop acts dominating the charts at the time. The festival quickly became known for its laid-back atmosphere, scenic riverside location, and commitment to alternative and indie music. Over the decades, the festival evolved from a free, one-day local event into a multi-day international gathering, hosting renowned acts such as Coldplay, Arcade Fire, Nick Cave, Sonic Youth, and LCD Soundsystem.

== Landmarks ==
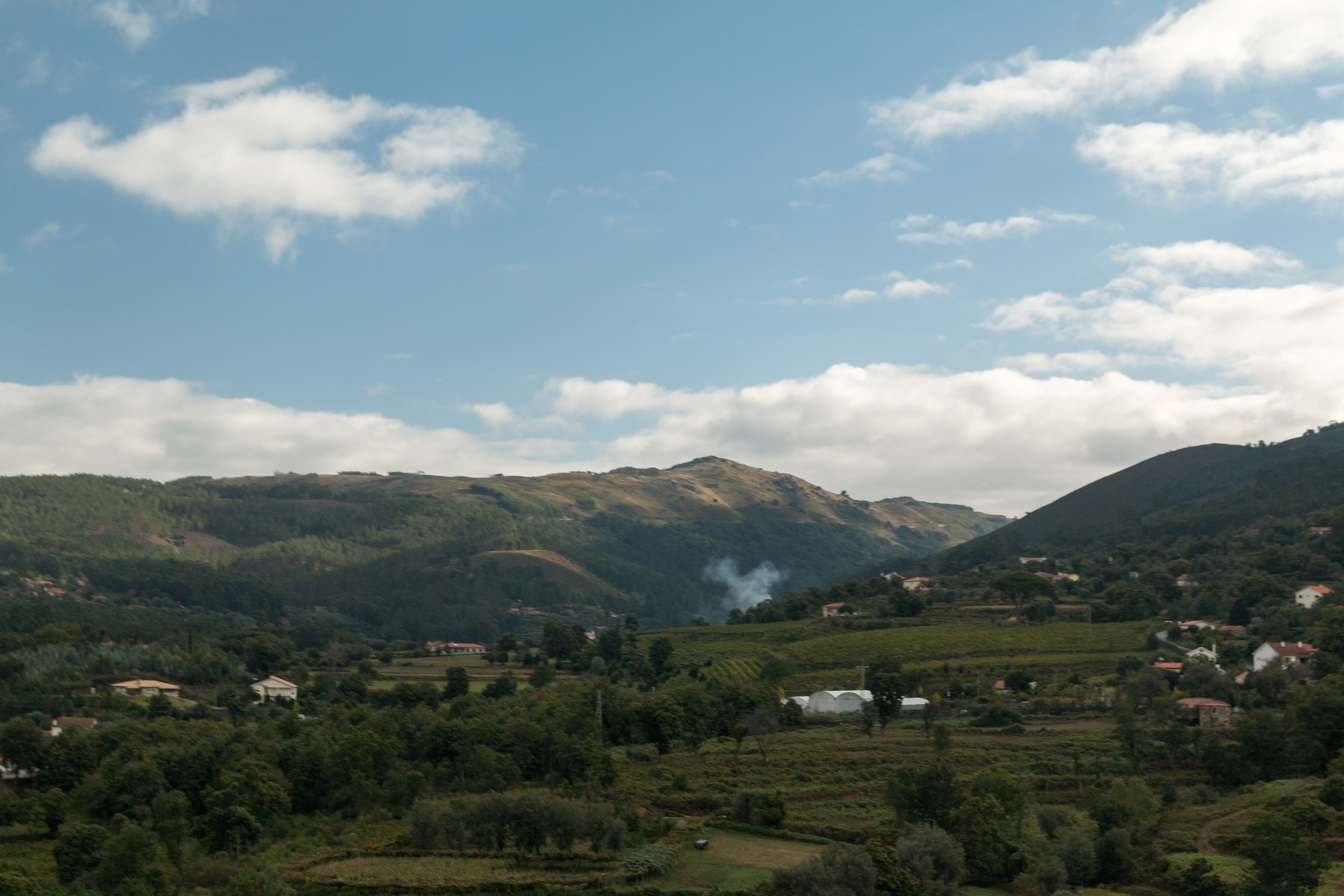
Corno do Bico landscape

Notable landmarks in Paredes de Coura include the Ponte de Rubiães, a Roman bridge dating back to the 2nd century, located on the historic Way of St. James. Another prominent feature is the Corno do Bico, a natural area known for its biodiversity and scenic trails and the highest point in the municipality at 883 metres (2,897 ft) above sea level.

== Notable people ==
- Tomás Rodrigues da Cunha (1598–1638) a Portuguese lay brother in the Order of Discalced Carmelites, known as Redemptus of the Cross. Beatified in 1900 by Pope Leo XIII
