= Alvados e Alcaria =

- Civil parish
- Location in Portugal
- Coordinates: 39°32′57″N 8°46′8″W
- Country: Portugal
- Region: Centro
- Intermunic. comm.: Região de Leiria
- District: Leiria
- Municipality: Porto de Mós
- Established: 28 January 2013

Area
  - Total: 24.45 km^{2} (9.44 sq mi)

Population (2021)
  - Total: 731
  - Density: 30/km^{2} (77/sq mi)
- Time zone: UTC+00:00 (WET)
  - Summer (DST): UTC+01:00 (WEST)
- Patron: Our Lady of Consolation of Alvados and Our Lady of Pleasures of Alcariah
- Website: https://www.alvadosealcaria.pt/

Alvados e Alcaria (officially União das Freguesias de Alvados e Alcaria) is a civil parish in the municipality of Porto de Mós, Portugal. The population in 2021 was 731, in an area of 24.45 km^{2}. It was the result of two freguesias joining on 28 January 2013; Alvados and Alcaria.
