= Alto Minho =

Intermunicipal community in northern Portugal

Alto Minho Upper Minho
- Intermunicipal community
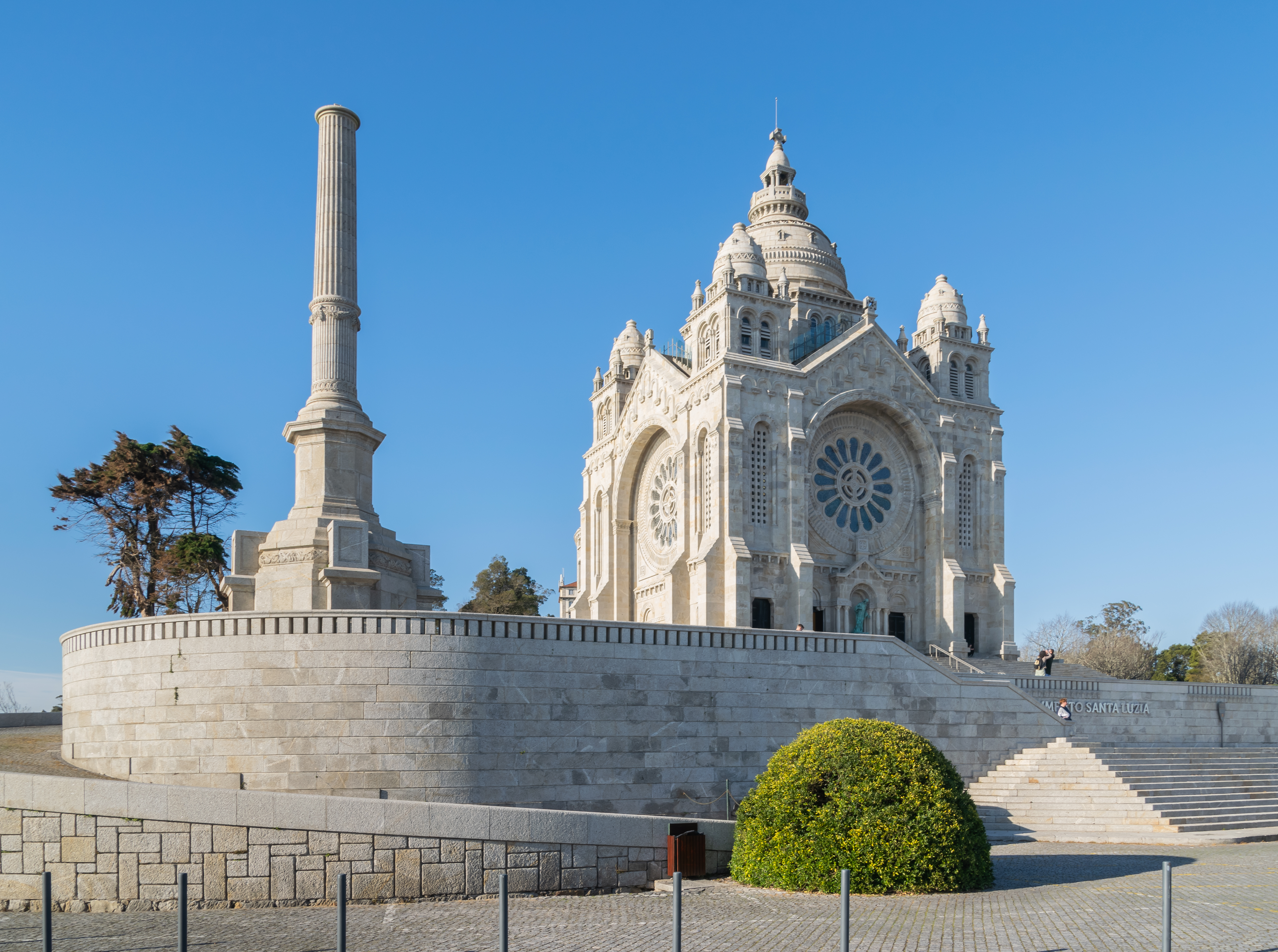
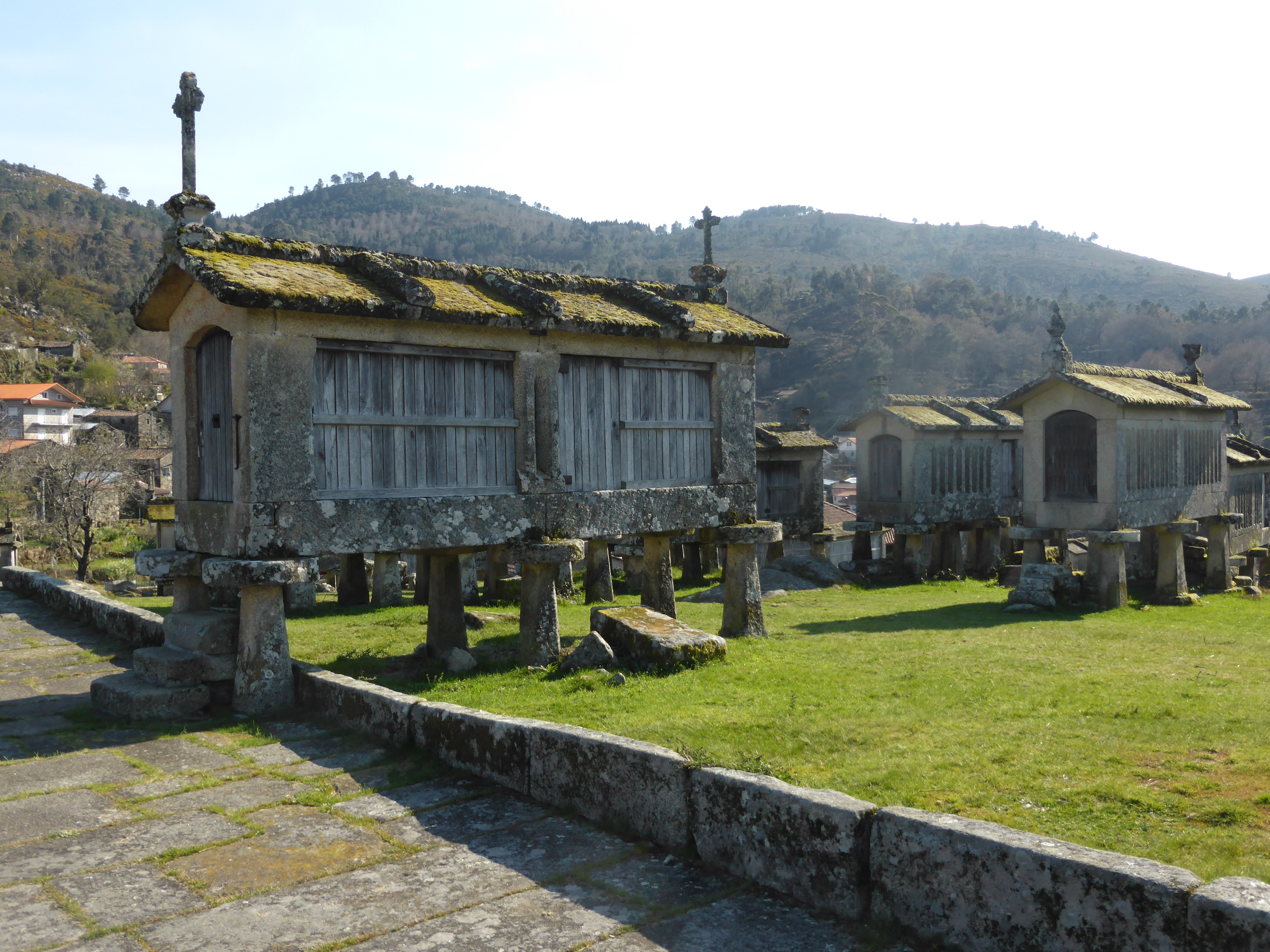
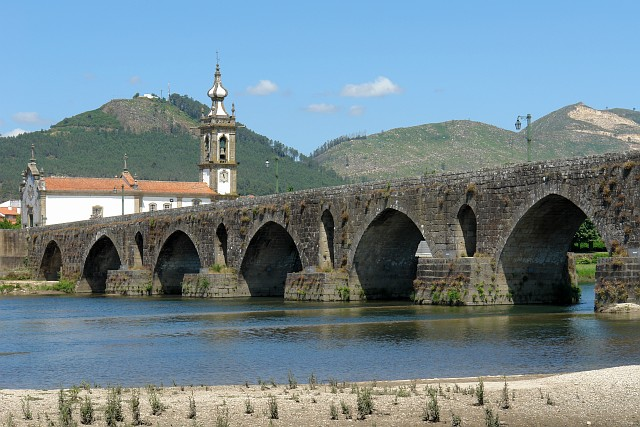
- Left to right, from top: Dusk panorama of the River Minho at Vila Nova de Cerveira; Sanctuary of Santa Luzia (Viana do Castelo), Lindoso granaries; Ponte de Lima bridge, Arcos de Valdevez, Terreiro square (Caminha)

- Brandmark

- Location of Alto Minho in Portugal
- Interactive map of Alto Minho
- Coordinates: 41°42′N 8°50′W
- Country: Portugal
- Region: Northern Portugal
- District: Viana do Castelo
- Historical province: Minho (1936 map), Entre-Douro-e-Minho (pre-1832)
- Established: 15 October 2008
- Seat: Viana do Castelo
- Municipalities: 10

Government
  - Type: Intermunicipal community (CIM)
  - Body: Council, Assembly, Executive Secretariat, Strategic Board
  - Council President (2025-29): António Barbosa (PSD, Monção)
  - Assembly President: Luís Brandão Coelho (PS, Valença)
  - First Secretary: José Paulo Queiroz

Area
  - Total: 2,218.84 km^{2} (856.70 sq mi)

Population (2021)
  - Total: 231,266
  - Density: 104.228/km^{2} (269.950/sq mi)
- Demonym: alto-minhoto
- Time zone: UTC+00:00 (WET)
  - Summer (DST): UTC+01:00 (WEST)
- Website: www.cim-altominho.pt

The Alto Minho (Portuguese pronunciation: [ˈaltu ˈmiɲu]) or Upper Minho is an intermunicipal community (CIM), NUTS-3 statistical region and cultural subregion in Northern Portugal. In the country's northwestern corner, it is coterminous with the district of Viana do Castelo. As of the 2021 census, it is the home of 231,266 residents in an area of 2,218.84 km^{2} (856.70 sq mi), within its 10 municipalities.

Situated between the River Minho and the valley of the Lima, its territory is marked by lower valley rivers among more mountainous areas leading into the northern portion of the Costa Verde and dotted by border fortresses. An area of strong gastronomic identity, it is part of the region that produces a specific type of wine called Vinho Verde.

The intermunicipal community was officially instituted in 2008, with its headquarters in the territory's main city, Viana do Castelo. It borders the Spanish region of Galicia to the north and east, the Cávado intermunicipal community to the south and the Atlantic Ocean to the west. Since January 2015, Alto Minho gives its name to the coterminous NUTS-3 subregion of Norte Region, formerly marked as Minho-Lima.

While the historical Minho province's name stems from its namesake river, the "Alto" (Upper) part of this subregion's name does not refer to its place along the water course, rather, it is tied to its location within the province's territory. The Baixo Minho (Lower Minho) in a non-hydrological context typically refers to the southern part of the province, effectively consisting of the Braga district, currently divided between the Cávado and Ave communities.

== Administrative history ==
The current institution of Alto Minho was already formed in the 21st century, but it's roots trace further back. Indeed, as a coterminous territory with the Viana do Castelo district, it's arguable that its history can in a way be traced back to that unit's creation in 1835.

In the second half of the 1970s, the central government approved the creation of the GATs (Technical Support Offices) which would aid local municipalities in their development. Alto Minho would consist of the offices marked A1 and A2, later known as Minho Valley (Vale do Minho, headquartered in Valença) and Lima Valley (Vale do Lima, based out of Viana do Castelo), respectively.

Portugal's accession to the EEC required the creation of a national map of NUTS statistics territories within the European framework. The NUTS-1986 map is the first to include the territorial concept as a NUTS-3 region under the name "Minho-Lima" and remains unchanged with the exception of its name change ahead of the NUTS-2015 map. At the same time, from the 1980s onward, the concept of intermunicipal associations for different purposes began to flourish, particularly after the European community funds distribution encouraged their establishment, namely for projects such as LEADER. From this two associations were born in 1994 - Vale do Minho (Minho Valley) and Valima (Vale do Lima - Lima Valley - later referred to as Valimar or Vale-e-Mar), accompanied by initially coterminous agricultural associations.

By the time the framework for the concept of "communities" was created in 2003, the two associations both decided that they would establish themselves in this newly created form, the former as an intermunicipal community and the latter as an urban community, both within the Minho-Lima NUTS-3 region. It was a regional division that, while approved, was not within the perspective of the central government, which believed the local reality was such and similar enough that it justified just one large community, as noted by then Secretary of State for Territorial Ordinance Miguel Relvas on the occasion of the establishment of the Valimar Urban Community on 11 March 2004.

Further legislation in this area would be created in 2008, revoking the 2003 bill and replacing it with an updated concept of the intermunicipal community in its stead. At the same time, some municipalities, such as Valença, among others, would come to seek unity in the subregion as it saw that the division could be detrimental to project funding.

On 15 October 2008, the Alto Minho Intermunicipal Community was officially instituted by its ten municipalities, absorbing the two existing communities and the functions of the two existing GATs, which had been nationally extinct a few days prior. The legal framework for intermunicipal communities was reviewed and updated in 2013. The existing associations continued to exist on a more local level, the Minho Valley reverted back to a Municipal Association in August 2009 and as of 2026 remains registered as active, while Valimar was extinct in 2011. Both agricultural regional association remain active.

== Municipalities ==
It is composed of ten municipalities:

Municipality	Population (2021)	Area (km^{2})
Arcos de Valdevez	20,720	447.60
Caminha	15,800	136.52
Melgaço	7,773	238.25
Monção	17,818	211.31
Paredes de Coura	8,632	138.19
Ponte da Barca	11,049	182.11
Ponte de Lima	41,169	320.25
Valença	13,625	117.13
Viana do Castelo	85,784	319.02
Vila Nova de Cerveira	8,923	108.47
Total	231,266	2,218.84

== Administration ==
Like all intermunicipal communities in Portugal, it is composed of four main bodies - the Intermunicipal Council (Conselho Intermunicipal), the Intermunicipal Assembly (Assembleia Intermunicipal), the Intermunicipal Executive Secretariat (Secretariado Executivo Intermunicipal) and the Strategic Council for Intermunicipal Development (Conselho Estratégico para o Desenvolvimento Intermunicipal).

The Alto Minho Intermunicipal Community is based out of Viana do Castelo, in the former Lima Valley GAT offices on Rua Bernardo Abrunhosa, 105. It has two technical service office branches - one in Ponte de Lima (Moraes Villa building, former headquarters of the Valimar Community) and another in Valença (Avenida Miguel Dantas, 69, which also houses the municipalities associations as well as being the former base of the Minho Valley GAT).
