= Viana do Castelo District =

District of Portugal

Coordinates: 41°41′42″N 8°49′48″W

District of Viana do Castelo Distrito de Viana do Castelo (Portuguese)
- District
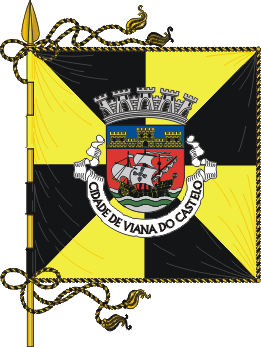
- Flag Coat of arms

- Location of Viana do Castelo within continental Portugal
- Country: Portugal
- Region: Northern Portugal
- Historical province: Entre Douro e Minho
- Number of municipalities: 10
- Number of parishes: 213
- Capital: Viana do Castelo

Area
  - Total: 2,255 km^{2} (871 sq mi)

Population (2006)
  - Total: 252,011
  - Density: 111.8/km^{2} (289.4/sq mi)
- ISO 3166 code: PT-16
- No. of parliamentary representatives: 5

The Viana do Castelo District (Portuguese: Distrito de Viana do Castelo [viˈɐnɐ ðu kɐʃˈtɛlu]) is a district located in the northwest of Portugal, bordered on the north by Spain (Galicia) and on the south by Braga District. It has an area of 2,255 km^{2} (871 sq mi) and a population of 252,011 (2006), for a density of 111.8 inhabitants/km^{2}. The district capital is the city of Viana do Castelo.

== Municipalities ==
The district is composed of ten municipalities:

- Arcos de Valdevez Municipality
- Caminha Municipality
- Melgaço Municipality
- Monção Municipality
- Paredes de Coura Municipality
- Ponte da Barca Municipality
- Ponte de Lima Municipality
- Valença Municipality
- Viana do Castelo Municipality
- Vila Nova de Cerveira Municipality

== List of Parliamentary Representatives ==
Member	Party
Anabela Rodrigues	PS
Eduardo Teixeira	PSD
Emília Cerqueira	PSD
Jorge Salgueiro Mendes	PSD
José Manuel Carpinteira	PS
Marina Gonçalves	PS

== Summary of votes and seats won 1976-2022 ==
Summary of election results from Viana do Castelo district, 1976-2022
Parties	%	S	%	S	%	S	%	S	%	S	%	S	%	S	%	S	%	S	%	S	%	S	%	S	%	S	%	S	%	S	%	S
Parties	1976		1979		1980		1983		1985		1987		1991		1995		1999		2002		2005		2009		2011		2015		2019		2022	
PS	25.5	2	24.9	2	22.8	1	32.5	2	18.4	1	20.3	1	25.2	2	38.8	3	40.2	3	35.3	3	42.0	3	36.3	3	26.2	2	29.8	2	34.8	3	42.1	3
PSD	32.8	3	In AD				32.6	3	33.5	3	54.5	5	56.9	4	42.1	3	35.8	2	45.5	3	33.5	2	31.3	2	43.6	3	In PàF		33.8	3	34.2	3
CDS-PP	23.5	2	In AD				18.4	1	16.6	1	7.7		7.2		11.3		14.0	1	10.3		11.4	1	13.6	1	13.4	1	In PàF		6.2		3.4	
AD			54.8	4	59.2	5																										
PRD									16.2	1	4.8																					
PàF																											45.5	4				
Total seats	7		6																													
Source: Comissão Nacional de Eleições
