= LAN party =

Temporary gathering of people with computers or game consoles

A LAN party is a social gathering of participants with personal computers or compatible game consoles, where a local area network (LAN) connection is established between the devices using a router or switch, primarily for the purpose of playing multiplayer video games together. LAN party events differ significantly from LAN gaming centers and Internet cafes in that LAN parties generally require participants to bring your own computer (BYOC) and are not permanent installations, often taking place in general-use venues or residences.

The size of these networks may vary from as few as two people to very large gatherings of a hundred or more. Small parties can form spontaneously and take advantage of common household networking equipment, but larger ones typically require more planning, equipment and preparation, even dedicated gaming servers. As of 2020, the world record for the size of a LAN party is 22,810 visitors, set at DreamHack, in Jönköping, Sweden. LAN parties were very popular in the Late 90s and 2000s, but their decline began in the early 2010s, mainly due to the advancement of online gaming and faster internet, which made it less necessary to physically meet to play.

== Small parties ==
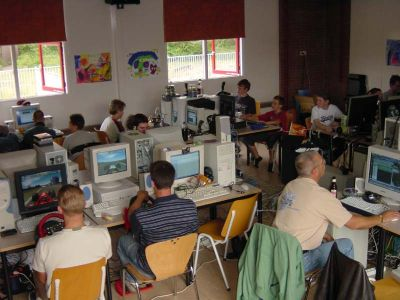
A LAN party in the Netherlands (2003)

Usually, smaller LAN parties consist of people bringing their computers over to each other's houses to host and play multiplayer games.

These are sometimes established between small groups of friends, and hosted at a central location or one that is known to all participants. Such events are often organized quickly with little planning, and some overnight events, with some stretching into days (or even weeks). Because of the small number of players, games are usually played on small levels and/or against bots.

If the venue lacks Wi-Fi, an ad hoc network may be set up, thereby eliminating the need for a wired network. Providing refreshments is often also a duty of the host, though guests are usually asked to contribute. In larger parties where participants may not all know each other personally, an entry fee may even be charged. Another tradition of some small groups is to purchase large amounts of fast food for consumption over many days. Many LAN participants will also bring food or drinks to consume over the course of the party—though they can be held at any hour, many LAN parties begin late in the evening and run through the next morning, making energy drinks a popular choice.

When some of the participants cannot be present or when merging a few LAN parties together, VPN software such as Hamachi can be used to arrange computers over the Internet so they appear to be on the same LAN.

Normally, the host will host the games but sometimes at very small LAN parties (e.g. 2 or 3 people) all participants will connect to an online internet server and add a word in front of their name to tell everyone else that they are a clan or group. At bigger LANs (e.g. 5 or more people) the host or a friend of the host will use a spare PC as a game server to serve all the participants. Usually the host and/or the owner are administrators.

The group can play together in another server as well if they wish as long as they are in the same LAN.

Private LAN parties were at their peak in popularity during the late 1990s to early 2000s when broadband internet access was either unavailable or too expensive for most people at the time. Another purpose for attending private LAN parties was also the opportunity to share software, movies or music among the participants. File-sharing over LAN networks provided a convenient way to exchange content among participants, as most average internet users did not have access to the high-speed and bandwidth that a broadband Internet connection offers to accommodate large file size downloads. Since the wide availability of high-speed internet, friends can more easily remotely play their multiplayer games together, using gaming-orientated software such as TeamSpeak, Discord and Steam. Social media can also assist in online meet-ups and communication for groups of friends to be able to play their multiplayer games online together, in the comfort of their own homes rather than the inconvenience of packing and then setting up their PC's to the LAN party host's location.

== Console-based LAN parties ==
A console-based private LAN party

While traditional LAN parties have solely consisted of computer gaming, the widespread adoption of network-centric console platforms, such as Xbox 360 and PlayStation 3, has led to an evolution in LAN parties. Modern consoles equipped with Ethernet ports are able to communicate with each other over standard routers or switches, much like traditional computers.

Console-LAN attendees need only their console, games, and television to garner the same local gaming experience as their computer-based counterparts. Many popular multiplayer games for the console have also been ported to the PC (e.g. Battlefield: Bad Company 2 and Halo: Combat Evolved). Developers have given consumers the choice to enjoy the same multiplayer games on multiple platforms, paving way for an alternative stage in 21st-century LAN parties.

== Larger parties ==
A photo from the world's largest LAN party, DreamHack

AMD Radeon ExtravaLANza Event in 2012

Many commercialized parties offer various tournaments, with competitions in such games as StarCraft, Warcraft III, World of Warcraft, Counter-Strike: Source, Counter-Strike: Global Offensive, Unreal Tournament, Fortnite, Kirby Air Ride, PlayerUnknown's Battlegrounds, Garry's Mod, and games from the Quake, Left 4 Dead, Call of Duty, Battlefield, Doom and Halo series. Prizes may be awarded to winners, and can include computer hardware such as overclocking kits, cases, lights, fans, graphics cards and sometimes even complete computers (often considered humorous as typically the winner of the competition would already have (and be competing on) a custom PC far superior to the prize).

The duration of events is not standardized; organized parties often last for a weekend.

Big LAN parties often offer a quiet place to sleep, shower, and eat, as well as hired security, alternative entertainment (such as music), and a dedicated support crew, as well as a professionally managed network including a connection to the Internet. Catering might come in the form of a bar, delivered food such as pizza, or nearby shops. Some parties come fully catered in the form of regular barbecues or even employment of a catering staff running a public canteen.

Gaming clans—groups of gamers that often play in team games—often use these gatherings to meet one another, since they typically play together over the Internet between other parties with little real-world contact. Their goal is often to win tournaments. Clans are often in "ladders" where they move up after winning a match. As well as counting for standings in national and international gaming leagues such as the CPL there are regular events such as QuakeCon in which the very best players from around the world compete against one another, much like in popular sports. Practice matches are usually held prior to a match so competitors can get a rough idea of what they are up against.

Often case modders and overclockers attend these events to display their computers, which otherwise would be seen by few. Some come just to display their computers and look at others' computers.

Some attendees also use these parties for the purpose of file sharing. Copyright infringement via file sharing is often discouraged or forbidden by the larger parties. However, enforcement is rare and spotty due to the time involved and often a lack of desire by organizers. Some LAN parties actively support file sharing for legitimate purposes (game patches, updates, user-contributed content), and may run Direct Connect hubs or other P2P service servers. One of the main reasons for running such servers is so file sharing can be monitored/controlled while standard Windows file sharing (SMB/CIFS) can be blocked, thus preventing the spread of SMB/CIFS-based viruses. Most P2P setups used at LAN parties also have a 'centralized' chat area, where all members of the LAN party can converse in an IRC-like environment.

There are also other kinds of parties not referred to as "LAN parties" where temporary LANs are built but are not used as the main attraction. Amongst these are demoparties such as Assembly and hacker conventions such as DEF CON.

In the traditionally active demoscene countries, such as those in Northern Europe, the LAN party culture is often heavily influenced by demoparties. This is due to the fact that many of the largest demoparties were already well established in the early 1990s and their facilities were also suitable for large-scale LAN party activity. This eventually led to gaming clans and other similar groups to attend these events and regard them merely as large LAN parties. On the other hand, it is not uncommon for "pure" LAN parties in Northern Europe to organize some demoscene-like competitions in areas such as computer graphics or home videos.

=== Sponsorship ===
Many computer companies, including NVIDIA, Cooler Master, Cyber Snipa, Antec, Corsair, Alienware, SteelSeries, Tesoro, and Thermaltake, offer sponsorship packages to large LAN parties, with funding, prizes, or equipment given in return for advertising. Many large-scale LAN parties seek such sponsorship, in order to reduce operating risk (often the organisers risk losing tens of thousands of dollars) and provide prizes for attendees.

== Culture ==
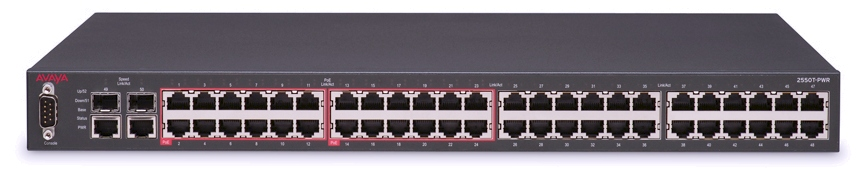
A 50-port plug-and-play Ethernet switch, which can provide network and internet access to up to 50 simultaneous computers or consoles

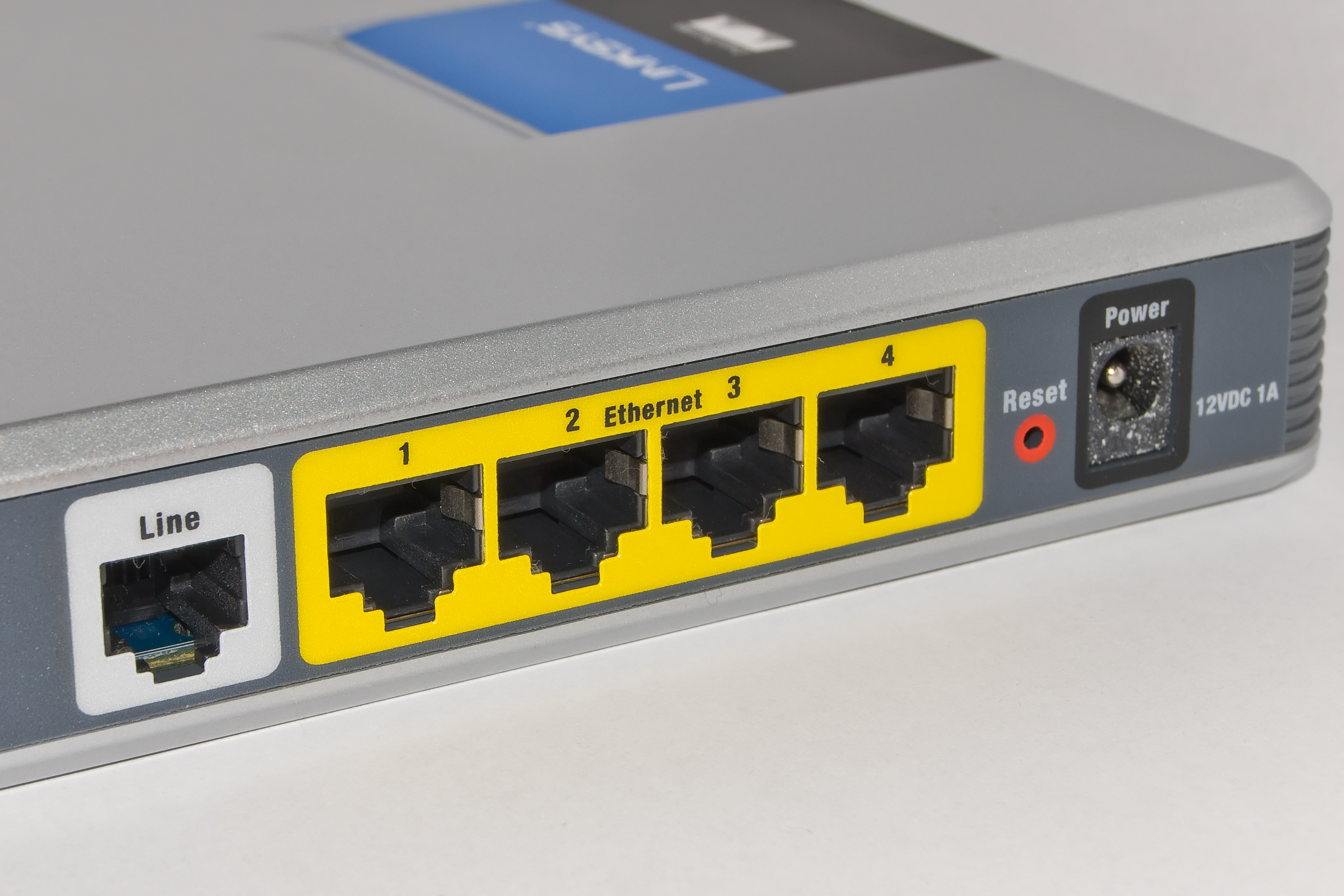
A typical home or small office router, which commonly comes equipped with 4 LAN Ethernet ports

LAN parties have their own unique culture. Enthusiasts often show off computers with extravagant aftermarket cooling systems, LED lighting effects, multi-display setups, and custom-built cases, and many other enhancements. Highly caffeinated drinks, termed energy drinks, are very popular in these events to improve concentration and stamina, since LAN parties often run into the early morning hours. Large parties can last for several days with no scheduled breaks. Most of the time, sleep is compromised to play for extended periods of time lasting from night to morning. There are also designated rooms separated from the LAN party for sleep.

== Notable events ==
- Assembly demo party, held annually in Helsinki, Finland, the world's largest gathering of demoscene programmers.
- CampZone, the world's largest outdoor LAN party held in the Netherlands.
- Cyberathlete Professional League, formerly one of the largest LAN events in the United States.
- DreamHack, claimed to be the largest LAN party in the world. Held twice annually in Jönköping, Sweden.
- Euskal Encounter, the largest (6000 people) and oldest (since 1994) LAN party in Spain, celebrated every July at the Bilbao Exhibition Centre in Barakaldo.
- Fragapalooza, one of the largest LAN parties in Canada. Held in Edmonton, Alberta.
- Frag Infinity Tournament, F.I.T.E.S. LAN is a major event held yearly in south central Pennsylvania.
- Gaming Scotland, the largest Scottish LAN party held at the Dobbie Hall, Scotland.
- Lan ETS, the largest LAN party in Canada. Held in Montreal, Quebec.
- Minho Campus Party, LAN party held annually in the Minho region, Portugal.
- Insomnia Gaming Festival, the largest LAN party in the United Kingdom, hosted by Multiplay. Held twice annually at the National Exhibition Centre in Birmingham, England.
- NETWAR, LAN party held bi-annually for charity in Omaha, Nebraska since 2003.
- Organised Chaos, Africa's largest monthly LAN party (1200 people). Held in the Bellville Velodrome in Cape Town, South Africa. Posted Over 2 days in the Weekend.
- PDXLAN, is one of the largest family and friend oriented annual LAN parties in the Northwestern US.
- Pittsburgh LAN Coalition, holds Iron Storm, a major semi-yearly LAN in Pittsburgh, Pennsylvania.
- QuakeCon, largest LAN party in the United States Held annually in Dallas, Texas.
- The Gathering, held in Hamar, Norway is one of the world's largest computer parties
- The Big LAN, held in Melbourne, Australia is currently the largest LAN event in Australia. It runs four times a year and focuses more on casual/fun tournaments, rather than esports.
- NAG LAN, held in various places in South Africa is currently the largest LAN event in South Africa. It runs once a year usually around early December.

== See also ==
- Block party
- Install fest
- MIDI Maze
