= Estádio Municipal de Braga =

Football stadium in Braga, Portugal

- A Pedreira (The Quarry)
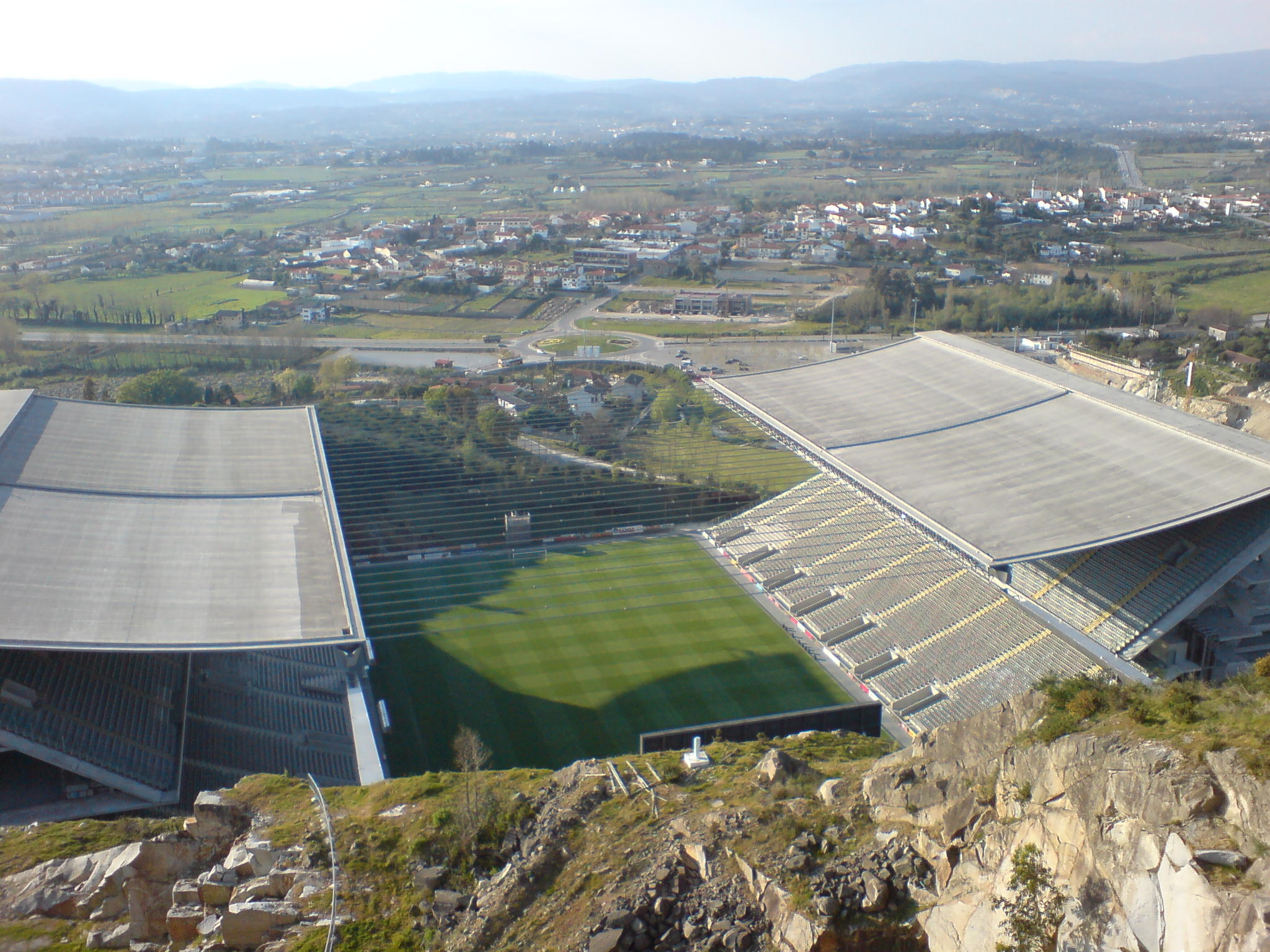
- UEFA
- Interactive map of Estádio Municipal de Braga
- Former names: Estádio AXA
- Location: Braga, Portugal
- Coordinates: 41°33′45″N 8°25′48″W
- Owner: Câmara Municipal de Braga
- Capacity: 30,286
- Surface: Grass
- Record attendance: 30,186 (14 February 2010); S.C. Braga 2–1 C.S. Marítimo
- Field size: 105 x 68 m

Construction
- Built: 2003; 23 years ago
- Opened: 30 December 2003; 22 years ago
- Cost: €200 million
- Architect: Eduardo Souto de Moura
- Structural engineer: AFA Associates
- General contractor: ACE
- Main contractors: Tensoteci, Soares da Costa, ASSOC, ACE, DMI, Rodrigues Gomes & Associados, AFA Associados, Cêgê, Gerisco, RWDI

Tenants
- Sporting Clube de Braga (2003–present); Portugal national football team (selected matches)

The Estádio Municipal de Braga (English: Braga Municipal Stadium) is an all-seater football stadium located in Braga, Portugal, and the current home of Sporting Clube de Braga. It has a capacity of 30,286 spectators, making it the seventh largest football stadium in Portugal. The stadium was designed by Portuguese architect Eduardo Souto de Moura who was awarded the Pritzker Architecture Prize in part for this design.

The stadium is owned by the municipality of Braga. Its nickname is A Pedreira (The Quarry), since it was carved into the side of a hill at its south end. The stadium was built in 2003 as a designated venue for the UEFA Euro 2004.

== History ==
The project to build a stadium was developed in 2000 by architect Eduardo Souto Moura. On 5 June, the program to build the new municipal stadium for the European championships in 2004 began, promoted by the municipal council of Braga. Construction began in 2002 and was completed in 2003. A football game between Sporting Braga and Celta Vigo inaugurated the opening of the stadium on 30 December 2003.

The enormous rock moving process contributed heavily to the exorbitant final €200 million cost, when the estimated cost for the initial project was just 29.9 million euros. This made it the most expensive of the ten new stadiums built for Euro 2004, even more expensive than the Estádio da Luz (capacity: 64,642), Estádio do Dragão (capacity: 50,033) and Estádio José Alvalade (capacity: 50,095).

During the UEFA European Championship in 2004, it was the site of 2 matches: the Group C game between Bulgaria and Denmark (18 June 2004) and the Group D game between Netherlands and Latvia (22 June 2004).

On 27 January 2005, a dispatch was opened by the president of the IPPAR to classify the stadium as a national patrimony. In the same year, Eduardo Souto Moura received the Secil Prize from Portuguese President Jorge Sampaio, for his work on the municipal stadium. It was followed six years later by the Pritzker Prize. In 2006 the stadium won the Chicago Athenaeum International Architecture Award for the best new global design. A Financial Times article on Britain's stadia referred to the municipal stadium as one of the four examples of "beautiful grounds", noting that: "There has been nothing in this country to match the architectural delight of Eduardo Souto de Moura’s stadium for Braga in Portugal, a breathtaking arena carved into the side of a rock face on the site of a former quarry."

In July 2007, Sporting Braga announced a three-year sponsorship deal with French insurance company AXA, which included a promotional change to the name of the municipal stadium by the club. Following this agreement, promoters and team officials began to refer to the municipal stadium of Braga as the Estádio AXA (AXA Stadium). However, the municipality (as landlord) clarified that the stadium had not been officially renamed, as this was a deal between its tenant and its partner. On 23 October 2009, the process to classify the stadium ran out, under terms of article 78 (decree 309/2009) but was prorogued on 23 October. As the principal tenant, Sporting Braga paid a monthly symbolic rent of €500 for the use of the stadium. In 2023 the municipality had started a process of selling it for 15 million euros to the club or to one of the club's major shareholders.

== Architecture ==
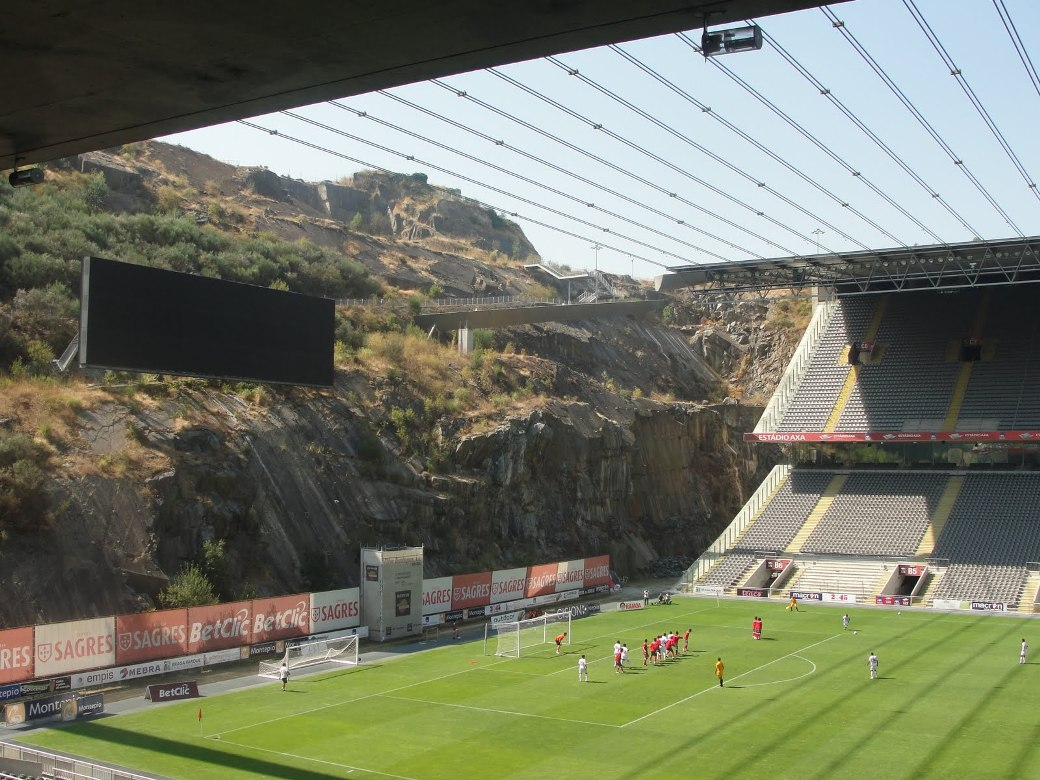
The quarry face and lateral stands, showing the steel-string canopy

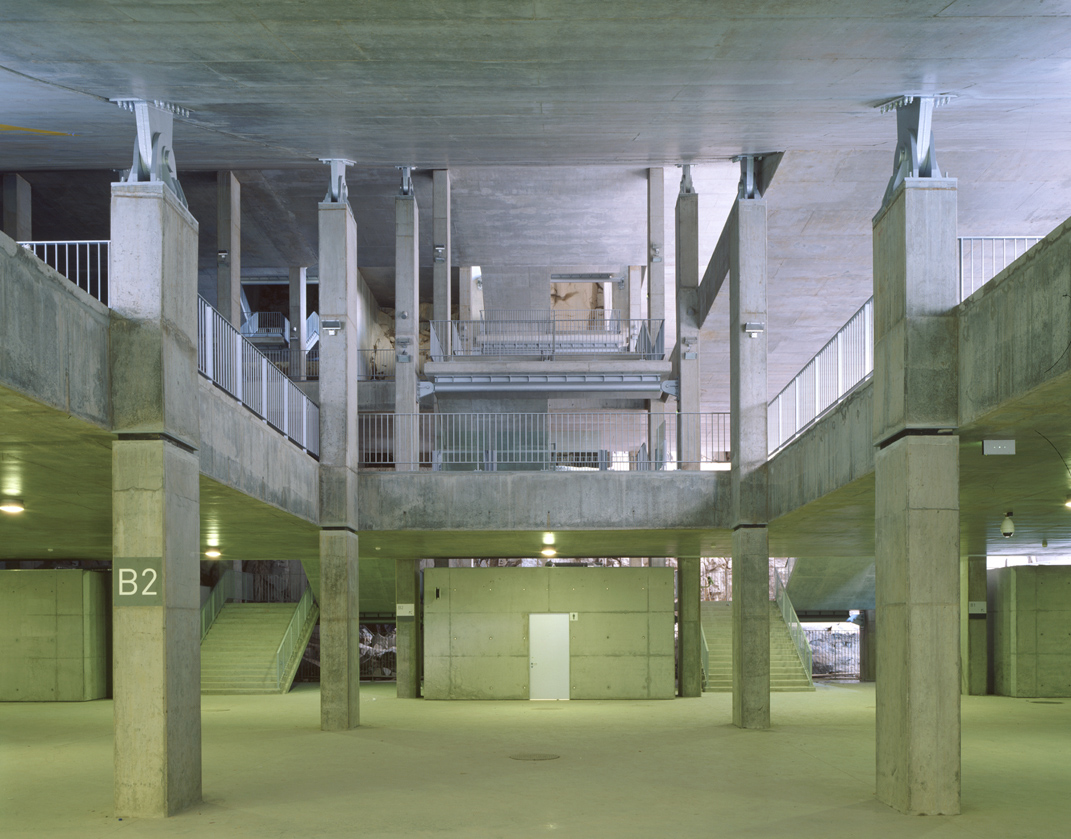
A view of the causeway and staircases servicing the stands and concession

The stadium is situated in an isolated, urban area on the north flank of Monte do Castro, in the sporting park of Dume. The stadium was carved from the Monte do Castro quarry that overlooked Braga; stands were constructed on either side of the pitch, while one of the goal backdrops was carved from the rock walls of the quarry. The opposite goal backdrop is dominated by the city sprawl. Each stand is covered with a canopy-style roof and connected by dozens of steel strings, a design inspired by ancient South American Incan bridges. Movement between stands is accomplished through a 5,000 square metres (54,000 sq ft) plaza under the pitch. It is regularly listed as one of the finest stadiums in world football.

== Events ==
- The stadium plaza held the Minho Campus Party, a LAN party, in 2004.
- The Corrs performed at the stadium in 2004 on their Borrowed Heaven Tour.
- The outskirts of the stadium annually host the "Enterro da Gata", a university festival that celebrates the end of the school year with multiple concerts and festivities, organized by the University of Minho.

== UEFA Euro 2004 ==
The following UEFA Euro 2004 matches were held in the stadium.

| Date | Team #1 | Result | Team #2 | Round | Attendance |
|---|---|---|---|---|---|
| 18 June 2004 | Bulgaria | 0–2 | Denmark | Group C | 24,131 |
| 23 June 2004 | Netherlands | 3–0 | Latvia | Group D | 27,904 |

== Portugal national team matches ==
The following national team matches were held in the stadium.

| # | Date | Score | Opponent | Competition | Attendance |
|---|---|---|---|---|---|
| 1. | 31 March 2004 | 1–2 | Italy | Friendly | 25,000 |
| 2. | 15 October 2008 | 0–0 | Albania | 2010 World Cup qualification | 29,500 |
| 3. | 11 September 2012 | 3–0 | Azerbaijan | 2014 World Cup qualification | 29,971 |
| 4. | 8 October 2015 | 1–0 | Denmark | Euro 2016 qualifying | 29,860 |
| 5. | 28 May 2018 | 2–2 | Tunisia | Friendly | 17,220 |
| 6. | 27 September 2022 | 0–1 | Spain | 2022–23 UEFA Nations League | 28,196 |
| 7. | 14 November 2026 | 1–4 | Denmark | 2026–27 UEFA Nations League | 24,879 |
