= Church of São Pedro de Rubiães =

Church of Rubiães
- Church of Saint Peter
- Igreja de Rubiães
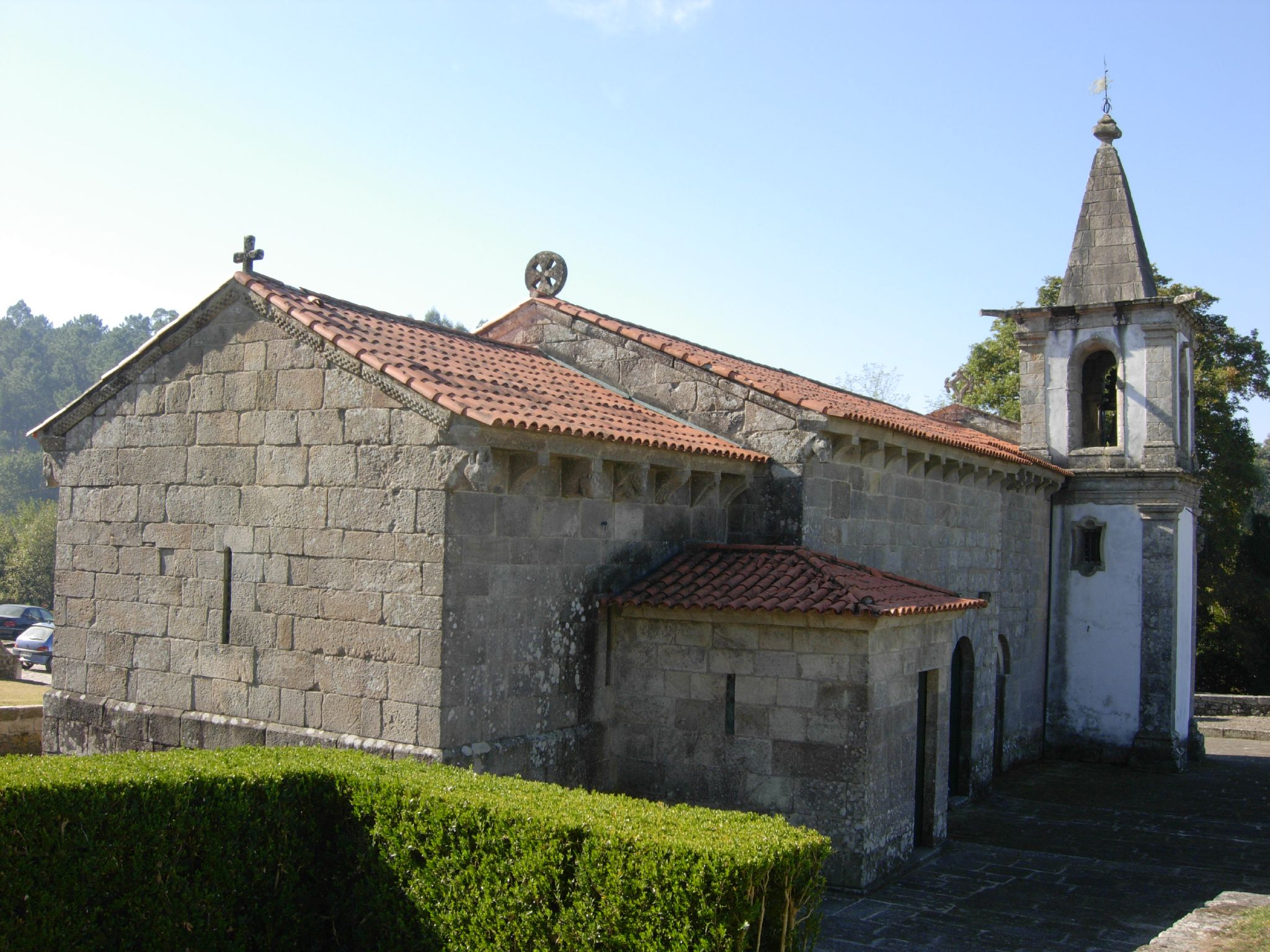
- The rear of the Church of São Pedro de Rubiães showing aspects of its medieval character, including sacristy
- Church of Rubiães
- 41°53′47.57″N 8°37′31.48″W
- Location: Viana do Castelo, Alto Minho, Norte
- Country: Portugal

Architecture
- Style: Romanesque, Baroque

Specifications
- Length: 11.08 m (36.4 ft)
- Width: 24.18 m (79.3 ft)

The Church of São Pedro de Rubiães (Portuguese: Igreja de São Pedro de Rubiães) is a 12th-century Romanesque church located in the civil parish of Rubiães in the municipality of Paredes de Coura, that was part of the medieval Way of St. James (Portuguese: Caminho de Santiago), the famous pilgrimage road to Santiago de Campostela. Over time it was expanded in the 16th and 17th century to become the parochial church of Rubiães. The Church was classified as National Monument in 1913.

== History ==
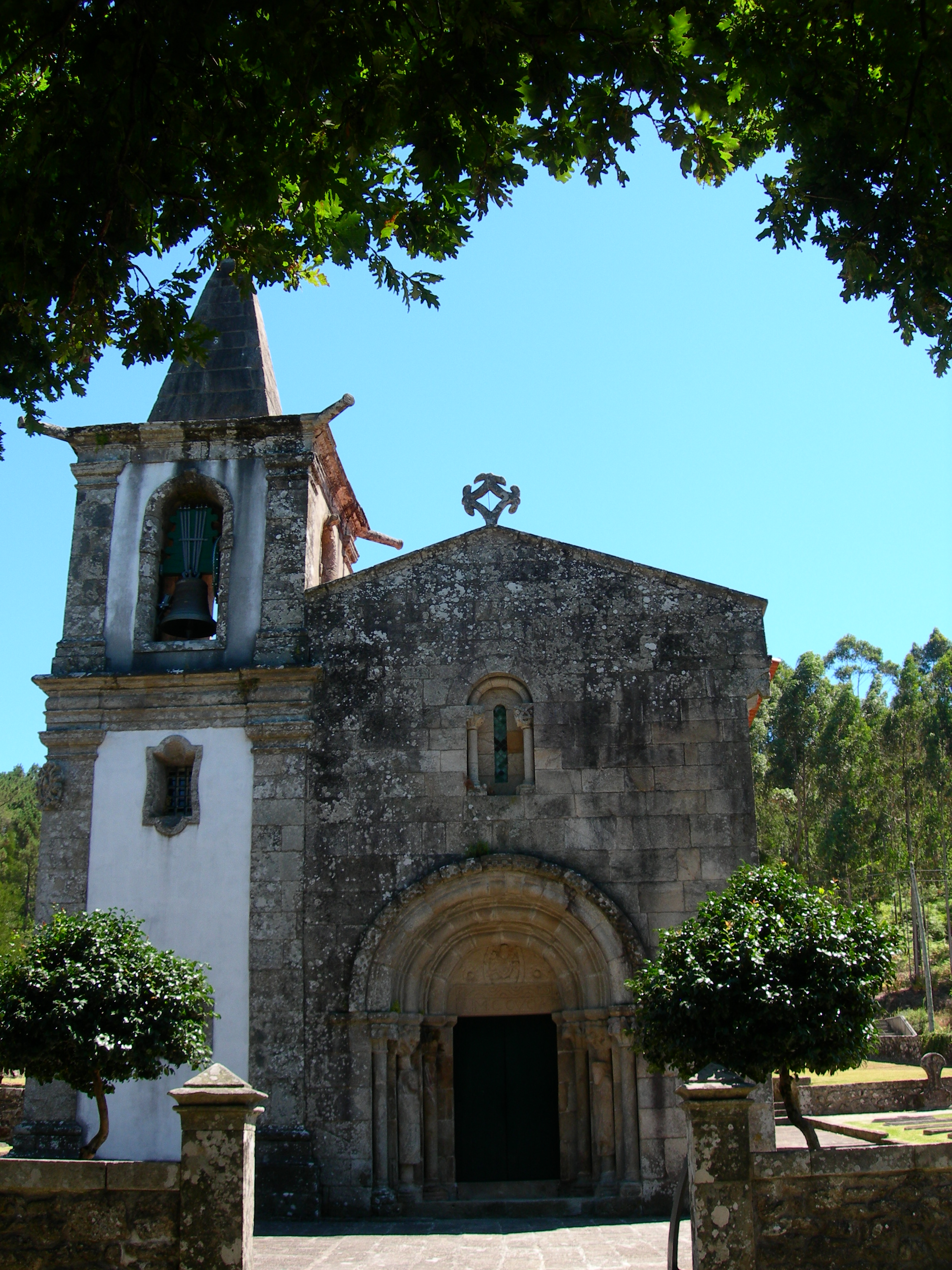
The front façade of the Romanesque Church of São Pedro, showing the mixture of medieval and Romanesque elements

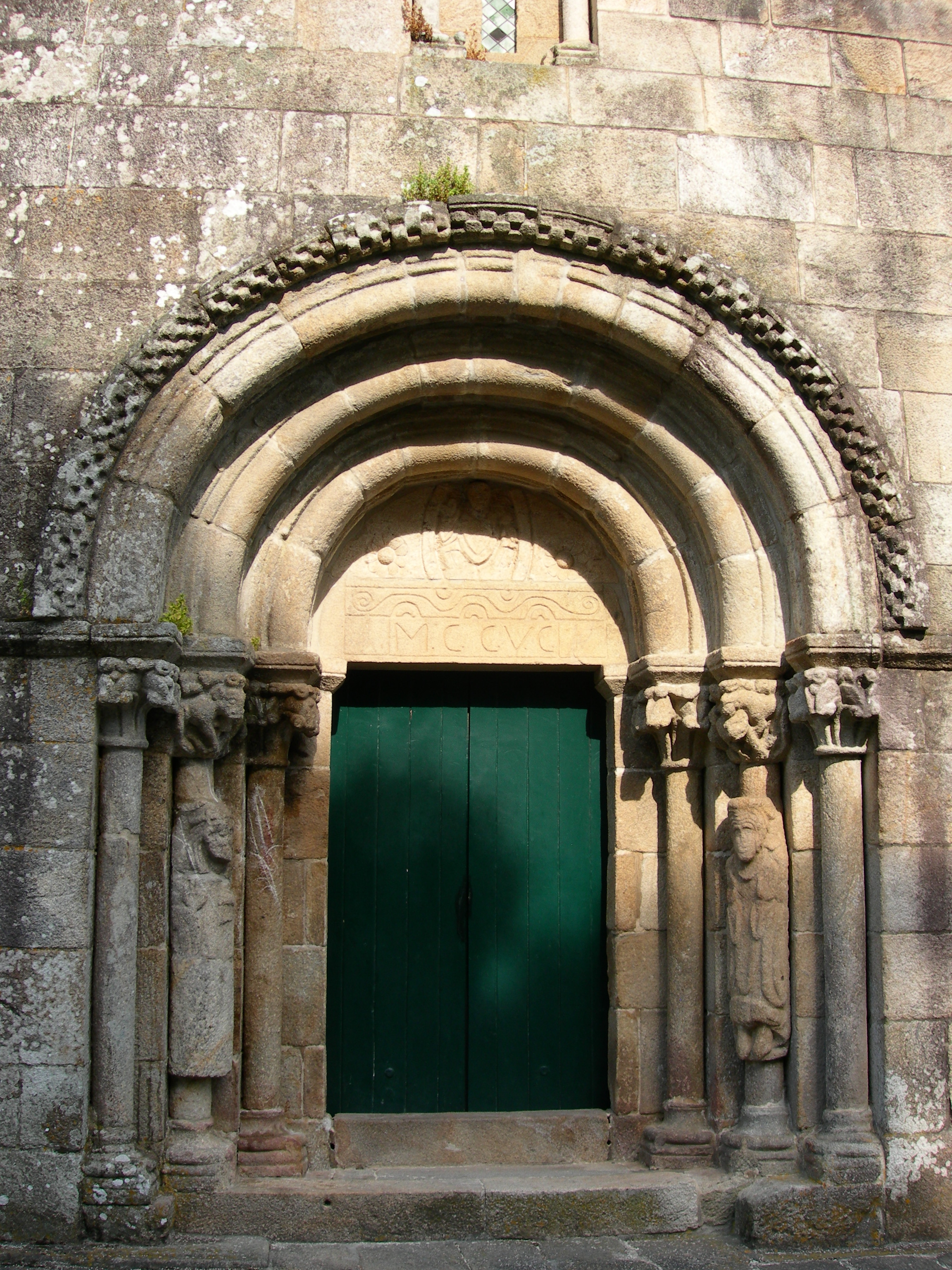
Detail of the portico, showing the decorated capitals, tympanum and lintel

Inscribed on the entrance lintel was the date 1295, and is assumed to be the date of the church's completion.

During the 16th century, the nave was extended towards the east reformulating the presbytery and sacristy. It was also at the end of this century that the first fresco was painted in the interior. At the beginning of the following century, another fresco was applied over the pre-existing painting. During the same period, the construction of Baroque-style bell-tower was completed, altering the medieval frontispiece.

In the 19th century, the tympanum was remodelled.

In 1936 the Direcção-Geral de Edifícios e Monumentos Nacionais (DGEMN) first intervened in the church, with the conclusion of various projects. In 1960, the roof was re-tiled, while a 1972 storm caused major problems and damages to the building. Two years later the main portico and prebestery were restored, supplemented by projects in the prebestery in 1978 and nave in 1980.

Further projects directed to restore and reinforce the stability of the building were also undertaken in the early 1990s. These included: treatments to water infiltration, repairs to the belltower and baptistery, cleaning and clearing of the exterior stones, restoration of fresco mural, installation of a drainage system (accompanied by the University of Minho archaeology department representatives). During the drainage project in 1996, excavators unearthed the vestiges of shallow medieval tombs. The excavation revealed two lines of overlapping tombs, with the first dating to the 13th century. The tombstones are organized in two parallel lines, on either side of the Church, and integrated into the space's relief. These tombs were excavated in the north and south of the Church and dismantled before the installation of the drainage system. Meanwhile, the roof of the sacristy was restored and painted, while electricity was introduced into the space.

== Architecture ==
São Pedro de Rubiães is located in an isolated, rural location, encircled by forest, alongside the N201 roadway and protected by a small wall. Alongside the northern and southern facades are several granite slabs of sepulchres from the historical cemetery, as well as a millennium marker. Although not located along the banks of the Minho River, it was situated stylistically within a regional focus overlooking the valley, in line with the Galician perspective at the time (as seen in the location of the Cathedral of Tui and other churches in the province of Pontevedra). The church comprises a longitudinal plan of a single rectangular nave, with an extended, rear presbytery and sacristy, subdivided into articulated volumes and covered in tiled roof.

The principal facade, complete with gable, includes an archway portico comprising four archivolts, three of which are mounted on column capitols with alternating vegetal and zoomorphic designs. An important part of the church is this axial portico, which represents theAnnunciation. The central columns include sculpted forms; on the left is a representation of an angel with long hair, beard and parchment (likely the Angel Gabriel), while the right form is the Virgin with veil and raised hands. Although these forms are not well defined, they testament to the popularity of public interests at the time of its carving, providing an iconographic representation of the scene rather than a clearly literal interpretation. These sculptural themes are comparable to the churches of Sanfins de Friestas, Longos Vales and Bravães and suggest its completion in the middle of the 13th century. The lintel is inscribed with the presumed date of its construction, while in the tympanum is the figure of Christ surrounded by aureola. The representation of Christ is part of the first revivalist reproduction of the tympanum, while the serpentine lintel which is thin and less profound, is almost graffiti and less to do with the original form. The tympanum although "a bad reconstitution, relatively modern, of the older piece" is part of the a restrictive number of representations of the Christ in aureola for the period, and is here treated summarily with de-contextualized flowers flanking the aureola. Even by the 1980s, there still existed fragments of the original tympanum in the area that confirmed that a copy was installed in the portal. Carlos Alberto Ferreira de Almeida dated the epigraph to 1257, although it seems late given the architectural elements of the Church, raising debate due to the difference stylistically in age of the elements. Almeida interpreted later writings, and assumed a late Galician influence on the temple, which was later rebuked in favour of an earlier date.

Above this entrance is a simple arched window over columns and decorated capitals.

In the northern corner of the Church is the rectangular bell-tower decorated with canon-like gargoyles extending from the corners under a pyramidal roof. The lateral walls included doors with double archivolts over simple tympanum, although the northern facade also has a door with smooth archway. Circling the entire building is a squared-off cornice, consisting of undulating or flat diamond-shaped forms decorated with zoomorphic or geometric motifs.

=== Interior ===
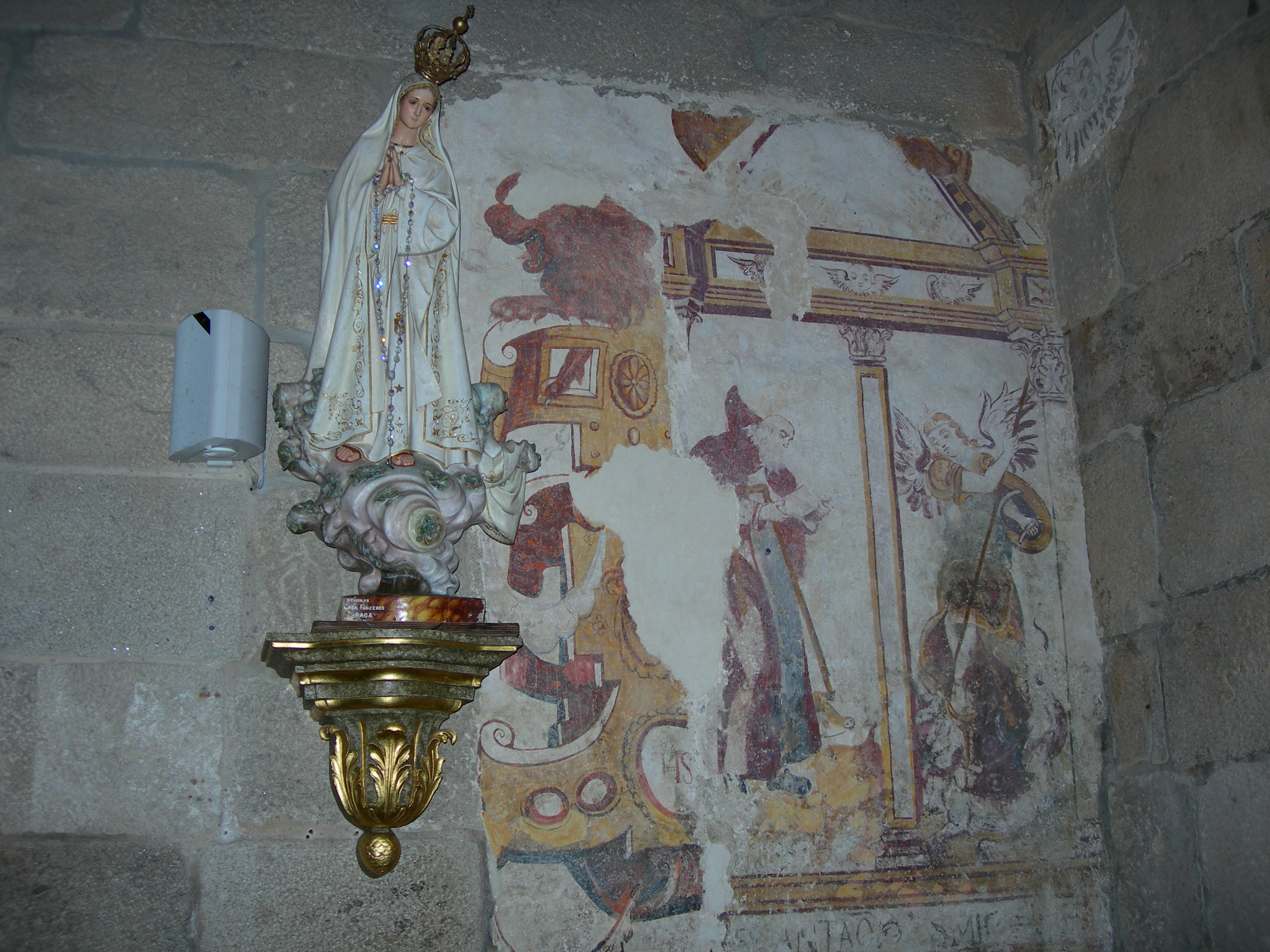
The remnants of the early fresco on the left of the altar

The temple is illuminated by the narrow slit windows that open into the interior, while the interior structure is supported by wood frame beams. The presbytery with two lateral and one central slit windows provides all the light into this space, which includes a granite altar against the wall. The squared cornices on the frontlet of the presbytery was a common feature of the Romanesque church in the Alto Minho region. The central window itself is decorated with columns and decorated capitals, surmounted by blocks supporting the simple arch.

At the left of the altar, through a triumphal arch, is fresco painting consisting of monk and angel, in partial ruin, with fragments missing. The interior paintings, executed in fresco over a thin layer of plaster, was completed in a restricted colour palette: ocres, reds, black, blue and a mixture of the two. Incisions were detected in the plaster, corresponding to the original design that was applied to the wall, although there are no indications of junctions between the plaster.
