= Gaming Scotland =

Gaming Scotland is a non-profit organisation which hosts regular LAN party events in Scotland These events are hosted at either Grangemouth Scout Hall or the Dobbie Hall in Larbert, Scotland, and accommodate twenty-five to one hundred people, depending on venue.

== History ==
Gaming Scotland was formed from the remnants of Gumpcom LAN Party when it was shut down in late 2010. The organisation is currently administered by 3 of Gumpcom's longest serving former staff members, who also staff the events alongside a few willing volunteers. Gaming Scotland as an organisation has run five successful events as of July 2011, although the staff have experience spanning the seven years of Gumpcom, including Gumpcom-LAN #15, the largest Scottish LAN party in current history.

== Current Events ==
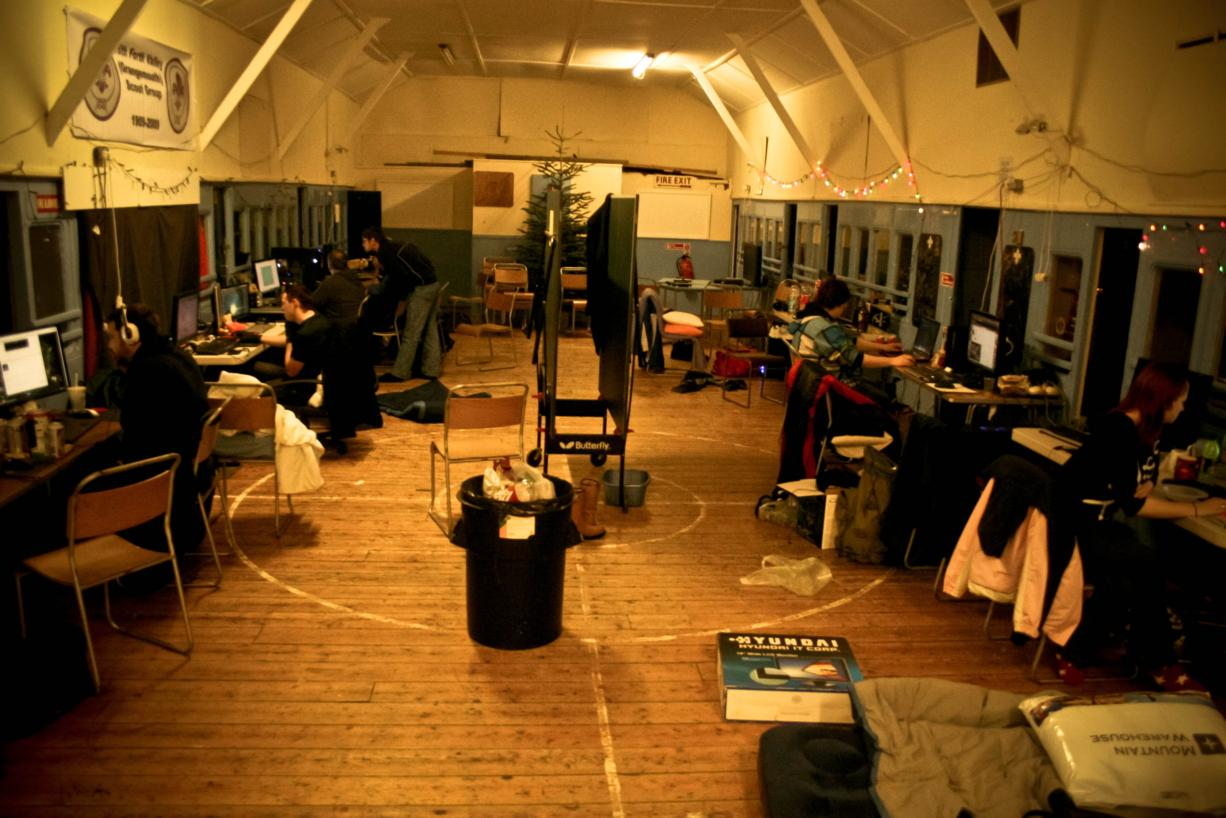
Example of a Gaming Scotland LAN party

Gaming Scotland currently hosts two LAN parties, small 25 man LANs in Grangemouth and large 100man+ events in Larbert.

The small events are community focused and do not have many tournament games or sponsored prizes.

The larger events have tournaments in some of the most popular computer games including; Counter-Strike: Global Offensive, Rocket League, Dota2, Overwatch and Warsow and is considered to have a more competitive edge in comparison to the Grangemouth events.

The Counter-Strike: Global Offensive tournament is generally the most popular, with up to 8 teams. The past few years the tournament has been dominated by a team known as click2kill. The captain of c2k, jMz had this to say about the Gaming Scotland LANs: "Gaming Scotland LANs are holding the LAN community of Scotland together with their regular, fun and social LANs. There is a whole host of games played ranging from battle arena, to survival games. The competitive side isn't taken too seriously which is great for newcomers and those who like a little bit of competitive play but don't want to spend the full weekend concentrating on one game. We've been coming since GS #17 which was our first CS:GO LAN win and we've managed to dominate and win a fair few more Dobbie Hall CS:GO tournaments."
