= Luís Simões da Silva =

Portuguese researcher

Luis Simoes da Silva
- Luís Alberto Proença Simões da Silva
- Born: 24 January 1962 (age 64); Coimbra, Portugal
- Education: University of Coimbra; Imperial College London
- Scientific career
- Workplaces: University of Coimbra; Institute for Sustainability and Innovation in Structural Engineering
- Website: Luis Simoes da Silva

Luís Alberto Proença Simões da Silva also known as Luis Simoes da Silva, (born 24 January 1962) is a professor of Structural Mechanics at the Department of Civil Engineering of the Faculty of Science and Technology at the University of Coimbra in Portugal. He is head of the Civil Engineering Department and director of Institute for Sustainability and Innovation in Structural Engineering research centre financed by FCT (Portuguese Foundation for Science and Technology) evaluated in 2014 with excellent. He is also president of cmm (Portuguese Steelwork Association).

== Education ==
He completed his BSc in structural engineering in 1984 at University of Coimbra. Then he completed his MSc in structural steel design (1986) and his PhD (and DIC) in structural mechanics in 1989, both at Imperial College London.

== Research ==
His activity strongly covers the following aspects: (i) connections, (ii) nonlinear design and stability, and (iii) sustainability, life-time engineering, monitoring and maintenance. In this context, he achieved the following results: • Author of 17 books, editor of 17 books, 154 scientific papers published in peer-reviewed international journals (130 in journals listed in the Science Citation Index Expanded (ISI Web of Knowledge)) and 496 papers published in international (293) and national (203) conference proceedings; • Supervision of 22 PhD thesis and 57 MSc thesis already concluded. Currently supervises 7 PhD thesis and 6 MSc thesis (full list in appendix). • Member of the Scientific or Organising Committees or Keynote Speaker of 113 international or national conferences (full list in appendix). • Coordination and participation in 57 international (35) and national (22) research projects with funding on a competitive basis, totalling 62.1 M€ of global budget and 15.3 M€ of budget for his research centre since 2005 and 10 international thematic networks (full list in appendix).

In the field of structural stability of steel members, components and systems he has significantly contributed to the development of fundamental knowledge, practical implementation and technological transfer, as follows: - Development and implementation of a consistent theoretical formulation for columns, beams and beam-columns with variable cross-section, backed by full-scale tests; - Proposal of a detailed methodology for design, in line with the general procedure of EN 1990, supported by a systematic statistical characterization of the relevant variables, collected in a European database; - Systematic safety assessment of the design rules of EN 1993–1–1; - Ongoing extension of the design rules for high strength steels, including pre-stressed columns; - Innovative development for curved steel panels, leading to methodologies for the design of stiffened and unstiffened panels for bridge, offshore and naval applications. Most of these developments were related to funded projects (HILONG, SAFEBRICTILE, STROBE, TAPERSTEEL, ULTIMATE PANEL, OUTBURST), which led to 5 PhD and 10 MSc theses, 5 books, 36 papers in ISI journals, 122 papers in conferences and 5 invited keynotes. The knowledge had direct impact in one amendment to Eurocode 3 and a new Annex (E) that recommends statistical parameters for the properties of steel profiles.

In the field of the analysis and design for steel and composite joints he has made significant contributions towards the development of performance based design methodologies focused on the prediction of the behavior of joints under generalized loading conditions, covering: (i) ductility of joints (1997-); (ii) fire behavior of joints (1998-); (iii) seismic behavior of joints (1995-); (iv) semi-rigid minor axis joints and I-beam to tubular joints (1995-); (v) joints under bending and axial force (2001-); (vi) composite joints (1995-); (vii) joints with beams of unequal depth; (viii) joints under impact loading; (ix) 3D behaviour of steel joints. These experimental, numerical and analytical developments led to: - Development and implementation of a generic 3D macro-element that simulates the behaviour of a structural node (including all joints) under static and cyclic conditions; - Development of a cyclic component model for the prediction of the response of steel joints under seismic loading; Most of those developments were achieved with funded projects (COMDYNCOMPST, SJOINTSEXTEV, INFASO, ROBUSTFIRE, HSS-SERF, COMPFIRE, FRAMEUP, INFASO+, EQUALJOINTS, FREEDAM, INNO3DJOINTS, EQUALJOINTS+, IMPACTFIRE, 3DJOINTS), that led to 2 books, 66 papers in ISI journals, 204 papers in conferences, 5 invited keynotes, 10 PhD and 21 MSc theses.

In the field of sustainability, life-time engineering, monitoring and maintenance, he pushed towards the introduction of sustainability thinking in structural engineering by proposing a European wide network action on Sustainability of Constructions – Integrated approach to life-time structural engineering, in 2005, that led to the development of methodologies for the life-cycle assessment of buildings and bridges, including the operational phase of buildings and innovative concepts for modular housing based on industrialization. Most of those developments were achieved with funded projects (COOLHAVEN, ECOSTEELPANEL, SBRI, SB_STEEL, LVS3, MODCONS, OPTIBRI, SBRI+, PROLIFE) and the network COST project C25, that led to 2 books, 23 papers in ISI journals, 71 papers in conferences, 3 invited keynotes, 3 PhD and 8 MSc theses.

== Academic service ==
He is chairman of the editorial board of ECCS. Chairman of the editorial board of “Steel Construction – Design and Construction”. Member of the editorial board of: “Steel and Composite Structures”, “Journal of Constructional Steel Research”, “Advanced Steel Construction”, “Revue Roumaine des Sciences Techniques - Série de Mécanique Appliquée”, edited by the Roumanian Academy and “Revista da Estrutura em Aço”, edited by CBCA, Brazil.

Silva serves on several committees in European Committee for Standardization, which currently includes: CT 115 – Structural Eurocodes (CEN TC 250); CT 171 – Sustainability of Constructions (CEN TC 350); President of CT 182 – Execution of Steel and Aluminium Structures (CEN TC 135); the Evolution Group EC3-1-1 – Eurocode 3, Part 1-1 (CEN TC 250-SC3-EvG-1-1); the Ad-hoc Group gamma_M – Eurocode 3, Part 1-1 (CEN TC 250-SC3-EvG-1-1); the Evolution Group EC3-1-8 – Eurocode 3, Part 1-8 (CEN TC 250-SC3-EvG-1-8); TC8 – Stability (ECCS TC8); TWG8.3 – Plated Structures (ECCS TWG8.3); TC10 – Connections (ECCS TC10); TC14 – Sustainability (ECCS TC14).

== Awards and honours ==
Year	Description
October 2013	European Convention for Constructional Steelwork Silver Medal
November 2013	Personality of the Year in Engineering - Journal CONSTRUIR
December 2014	The Portuguese Academy of Engineering member award
