= Rubiães =

- Civil parish
- Location in Portugal
- Coordinates: 41.896°N 8.625°W
- Country: Portugal
- Region: Norte
- Intermunic. comm.: Alto Minho
- District: Viana do Castelo
- Municipality: Paredes de Coura

Area
  - Total: 9.08 km^{2} (3.51 sq mi)

Population (2011)
  - Total: 512
  - Density: 56/km^{2} (150/sq mi)
- Time zone: UTC+00:00 (WET)
  - Summer (DST): UTC+01:00 (WEST)

Rubiães is a civil parish in the municipality of Paredes de Coura, Portugal. The population in 2011 was 512, in an area of 9.08 km².

== Sites of interests ==
- Igreja de São Pedro de Rubiães
- Roman road from Braga to Tui
- Ponte de Rubiães (Roman)
- Solar das Antas
