= Campzone =

Outdoor LAN event

- Location: Eindhoven
- Type: LAN event

CampZone is a large outdoor LAN event organized by Duh-Events. It takes place in the summer and lasts for eleven days. The first eight editions were organized by GameParty.net. Duh-Events took over organizing CampZone in 2009. British software house Codemasters (2003–2008), Getronics PinkRoccade (2007–2008) are known for being the main sponsors of the event. Since CampZone 2012, Rabobank has been the main sponsor.

== Location ==
=== 2001–2006 ===
From its beginning in 2000, until 2006, CampZone was held on the festival grounds surrounding the Walibi World amusement park. These grounds were originally created to accommodate the 18th World Scout Jamboree. Since then the terrain has been used for several large-scale events, such as the annual Lowlands music festival. These fields are fully drained, so they could be used for camping in the relatively wet Dutch climate.

The festival grounds are subdivided into smaller fields separated by a thin treeline. CampZone used two of these fields: one for entry, car parking and sports activities, the other for the event itself. The fields used are approximately 56,700 m^{2} (67,800 yd^{2}), about nine soccer fields in size.

Due to the nearby presence of a hostel for terminally ill children (the Colombinehuis), strict rules pertaining to sound were enforced during the event. The sections of the field used during CampZone nearest to this hostel were reserved for participants generating only moderate noise levels. People bringing sound systems capable of generating over 100 watts of output were required to use the sections of the field furthest away from the Colombinehuis.

=== 2007–2015 ===
In 2007 CampZone moved to Oirschot, near Eindhoven, the Netherlands. This is easily accessible from Eindhoven Airport, to draw more visitors from outside the Netherlands. The new location received a lot of criticism, due to the bad road leading to it and because the extreme amounts of rainwater did not drain well during CampZone 2007.

The 2009 and 2010 editions of the event continued the success of the previous editions, although the organization of the events was more difficult than before due to the financial crisis. Over time the event changed from an outdoor LAN party to something more like a festival. This change is mostly visible in the growing amount of non-computer related extra activities. In the past years the organization has teamed up with the Dutch Army to provide some of those activities, which range from running obstacle courses to shooting simulations.

As of 2012, CampZone has booked several music groups to play during the event.

The 2013 edition featured a new field layout, to make the field more centered on the central activities field and the main-tent. The parking was moved further from the main road to make it less accessible for non-visitors. These changes were also made to save some cost on the power and networking grid.

=== 2016–2018 ===
In 2016 CampZone moved to Kronenberg, near Venlo, the Netherlands.

=== 2019–Present ===
In 2019 CampZone moved to Veghel, next to the A50 between the cities of Nijmegen and Eindhoven.

== Origin ==
CampZone originated from WAN, a smaller LAN party which was held in the recreation area "De Kibbelkoele" near Emmen (NL). WAN was held from 1998 until 2000 (WAN NULL).

== Past events ==
CampZone 1 (2001)

  - ≈400 visitors
  - Festival grounds of Walibi World
  - 350 kVA power generator used

CampZone 2 (2002)

  - ≈800 visitors
  - Festival grounds of Walibi World
  - 350 kVA power generator used

CampZone 3 (2003)

  - ≈1200 visitors
  - Festival grounds of Walibi World
  - 650 kVA power generator used

CampZone 4 (2004)

  - ≈1500 visitors
  - Festival grounds of Walibi World
  - 1000 kVA power generator used

CampZone 5 (2005)

  - ≈1750 visitors
  - Festival grounds of Walibi World
  - 1250 kVA power generator used

CampZone 6 (2006)

  - ≈2000 visitors
  - Festival grounds of Walibi World
  - 1250 kVA power generator used (nearly 40000 liters of diesel)

CampZone 7 (2007)

- ≈1500 visitors
  - New location near Eindhoven (Westfields, Oirschot)
  - 4 250 kVa power generators

CampZone 8 (2008)

  - ≈1500 visitors
  - Same location near Eindhoven as in 2007
  - 4 250 kVa power generators

CampZone 9 (2009)

  - ≈1500 visitors
  - Same location near Eindhoven as in 2007 and 2008
  - 4 250 kVa power generators

CampZone 10 (2010)

- ≈1500 visitors
  - Same location near Eindhoven as in 2007, 2008 and 2009
  - 4 250 kVa power generators

CampZone 11 (2011)

- ≈1500 visitors
- CampZone-location near Oirschot
- 4 250 kVa power generators

CampZone 12 (2012)

- ≈1500 visitors
- CampZone-location near Oirschot
- 4 250 kVa power generators

CampZone 13 (2013)

- ≈1500 visitors
- CampZone-location near Oirschot
- 4 250 kVa power generators

CampZone 14 (2014)

- ≈1750 visitors
- CampZone-location near Oirschot
- 3 350 kVa power generators

CampZone 15 (2015)

- ≈1950 visitors
- CampZone-location near Oirschot
- 3 350 kVa power generators

CampZone 16 (2016)

- ≈2200 visitors
- Terrein D'n Umswing in Kronenberg Limburg
- 3 350 kVa power generators

CampZone 17 (2017)

- ≈2800 visitors
- Terrein D'n Umswing in Kronenberg Limburg
- 3 350 kVa power generators

CampZone 18 (2018)

- ≈2900 visitors
- Terrein D'n Umswing in Kronenberg Limburg
- 3 350 kVa power generators

CampZone 19 (2019)

- ≈3000+ visitors (predicted)
- Corridor 20 Veghel
- 3 350 kVa power generators (predicted)

== Organisation ==
The organisation behind CampZone consists completely of dedicated volunteers. The basic structure of the CampZone organisation is as follows:

- Main organisation (5 persons), responsible for the event. They are addressed with all problems and take care of agendas, structure, information etc.
  - Network team (9 persons since the formation of the Campzone Community Network team, CCN), responsible for the network.
  - Server team (6 persons), responsible for the servers and services needed for a network.
  - Webteam (≈10 persons), responsible for the intranet and internet site. They also maintain order on the sites.
  - Competitions team (8 persons), responsible for gaming competitions during the event.
  - Activities team (9 persons), responsible for extra activities during the event, such as sports.
  - Power team (4 persons), responsible for the power at CampZone. They take care of the power, the power-distribution, monitoring of the power and mainly all heavy machinery. They also take care of the sanitary (warm showers, running water and such).
  - Field admins (30 persons), administer the giving out of network ports and power for their field, and keep directly in touch with the main organisation and technical teams. They are the first to address for visitors who are experiencing problems, and make sure that only the structural or global problems reach the main organisation or technical teams.
  - Main security (3 persons), responsible for security. They make sure security runs in shifts, problems are swiftly addressed and global order and rules are maintained. They make the final decisions when problems occur.
    - security (20 persons), voluntary visitors who see to safety and order on the event. They work in shifts and keep notes of events and troubles.
  - First aid (7 persons), responsible for applying first aid to visitors who need it.
  - Gate-crew (10 persons), watching the gate of the event. They also upgrade payment cards, a money system Campzone uses so visitors do not have to go around carrying real money.
  - Casemod-crew, supervise the casemodding on CampZone. Casemodding is quite popular among LAN party visitors, but since it uses dangerous tools and machinery, CampZone supplies with a special section for this practise. Four people supervise this, helping the visitors who are modifying their cases, but also making sure that it is done safely to prevent injuries and broken computer parts.

== Network ==
Until CampZone 7, the network was based around a central high-speed glass fiber switch, with cables to sub-switches on each field. Those field switches are operated and supervised by the field admins for that particular field. Connected computers needed to manually configure a fixed IP address for the network. The core of the network, as well as many servers brought by visitors, resided in the Network Heardquarters (NHQ), a temporary air-conditioned building. Wireless network access and Internet were also available at CampZone 7 (although limited).

For the next edition, an entirely new network has been designed. The new network is a routed network. Each field gets its own high-speed switch (HP Procure 9300 series) which are interconnected using 8 to 20 gigabit links. Every end-user switch has its own subnet so that network issues remain local problems and do not affect the entire network, as well as limiting unneeded broadcast traffic. Also, DHCP is used, removing the need to manually configure IP addresses. In order to allow for certain types of broadcast traffic, a custom-built system is used that relays certain packets (such as gameserver discovery packets) across the entire network. In addition, thanks to the high speeds at which fields are connected, every participant can use gigabit Ethernet to connect their own PC to the network. Previously gigabit connections were available in few numbers and reserved for people who shared the link with several others. Altogether this should prove for a much more advanced, faster, more stable network.

== Power ==
Since there is no normal power source at the location of CampZone, the power has to be generated there. The entire event greatly depends on trustworthy stable power, because computers and other hardware can very easily damage when the current fluctuates, or is not properly aligned or consequent.

Some power usage facts of CampZone 7 (2007):

  - 4x 250 kVA generators, which are linked together.
  - The generators were configured so that the next one automatically starts when the other ones are at 80% capacity.
  - 30.000 litre (7925 US gallon) diesel was used by the generators.
  - A total of about 250 16 amp groups available for visitors (each shared by ≈5 people).
  - 8 km (5.0 mi) power cable in various diameters.

== Competitions and activities ==
During the event, many official and unofficial competitions are held. The official PC competitions are organized by the CampZone crew. All official competitions offer prizes for at least the winner, most of which are provided by sponsors.

The official outdoor competitions are organized by the activities team of Duh-Events. Most competitions are announced long before the start of the event, but some outdoor competitions are announced during the event. Examples of outdoor competitions held during previous editions of CampZone are riding a mechanical bull and playing soccer on a field of soap.

Unofficial competitions can be organized by visitors and vary from playing old-fashioned board or card games, to sports and a "strongest man" competition.

== Notable groups on CampZone ==
The following groups are amongst the biggest on CampZone. They vary from 10 to 30+ people in each group.

- Clan Badjas
- Feestjuh Online
- Fus1on
- HMO
- LAM
- LDT
- New Army on the Block
- Tent Jeroen
- Tweakers @ Campzone
- WallyLan
- Clan Trappist
- Thor
