= Organised Chaos LAN Party =

South African monthly video gaming mass gathering

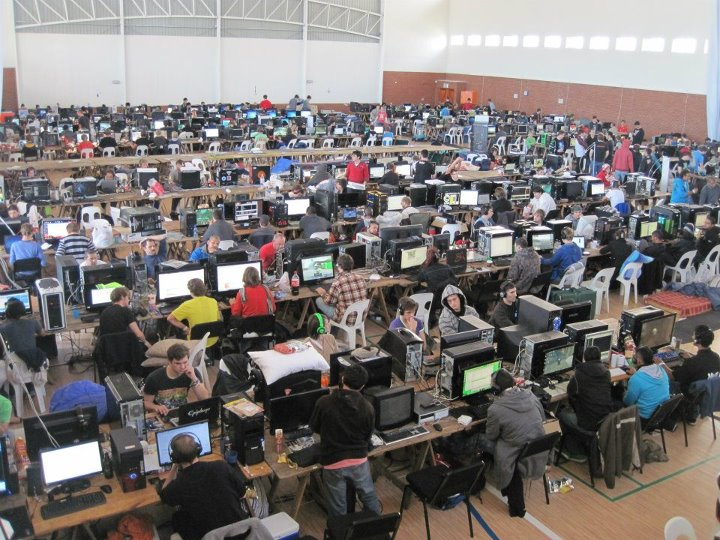
Organised Chaos Sunningdale June 2012.

Organised Chaos (normally abbreviated as OC), was a monthly LAN Party held in Cape Town, South Africa at the Bellville Velodrome, Sunningdale Sports Complex as well as other venues in both Bloemfontein and Port Elizabeth. The LAN had a capacity of 540 after moving away from the Bellville Velodrome in April 2012. The largest LAN Party held by Organised Chaos was in December 2010 at the Bellville Velodrome with a total of 1263 attendees. Its main organizers were Dietmar Rheeder-Kleist, Lance Aylward and Kyra Rheeder-Kleist. It was the largest monthly gaming event and LAN party in Africa

After being put up for sale in 2014 and failing to attract a buyer, OC was closed down.

== Venues ==
The venues used by Organised Chaos to host LAN parties.

=== Current Venues ===
==== Cape Town ====
- Sunningdale Sports Complex
- Belville Velodrome

==== Bloemfontein ====
- Bloem Skou

==== Port Elizabeth ====
- Heinz Betz Hall - NMMU North Campus

==== Stellenbosch ====
- Academia

=== Past Venues ===
==== Cape Town ====
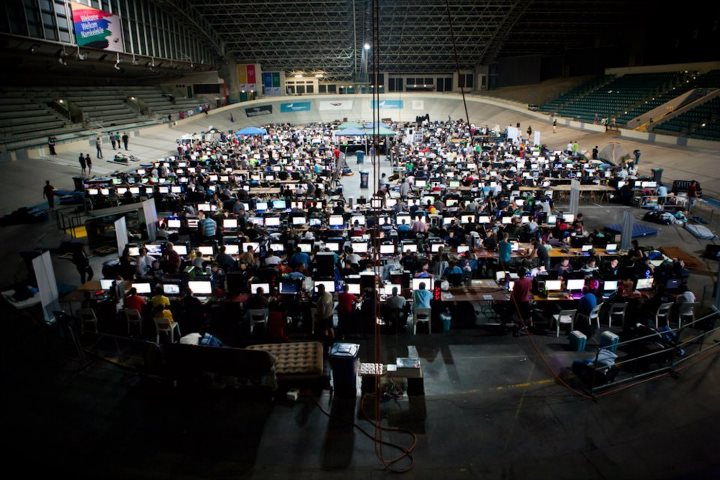
Domes Day @ The Bellville Velodrome March 2012.

- Bellville Velodrome
- Mica Willowbridge
- Warehouse 17 - Victoria & Alfred Waterfront
- Fish Hoek Senior Sports Hall
- Milnerton High School
- Thunder City
- Storm Modelling Agency
- Theo Marais Sports Hall
- Table View High School

==== Johannesburg ====
- Gallagher Convention Centre

== Organised Gaming Association ==
The Organised Gaming Association arranged a number of tournaments including the Frontosa Call of Duty 4 series and the Cafe Viva DotA series. The establishment of OGA was met with controversy after it was announced that members would have to sign MSSA (Mind Sports South Africa) membership forms. The Frontosa Call of Duty 4 series has the highest prize money of all LAN events in South Africa, with a total of R30,000 (US$3,800) prize money.

The Organised Gaming Association has gone dormant and is no longer as a means of hosting tournaments pending a restructuring and massive development of a software framework required to run OGA.

The current tournament structure is formed by its crew members for each event with both social and competitive tournaments taking place. Prize money for the tournaments includes the pool of players buying into the tournaments and the internal contribution from Organised Chaos revenue.

== Crew Members ==
The current Organised Chaos crew members who assist with the setup of the venues for each event, writing articles, web and application development, bookings, server administration, hosting tournaments, photography and technical assistance.

=== Owners/Organisers ===
- Dean Anthony Krumbock (Owner)
- Dietmar Rheeder-Kleist (Founder)
- Lance Aylward (Previous Owner/Development Team)
- Kyra Rheeder-Kleist (Previous Booking Manager)
