= PDXLAN =

- Genre: LAN
- Frequency: Spring and Fall
- Location: Ridgefield, Washington USA
- Years active: 2003-Present
- Inaugurated: 07/2003
- Website: http://www.pdxlan.net

PDXLAN is the largest computer LAN Party event in the American Northwest. The main event occurs twice per year, at the Clark County Event Center in Ridgefield, Washington.

== Event summary ==
The twice annual events run 4 days, typically across a weekend. Attendees' ages range greatly from young children to, in some cases, senior citizens.

== History ==
Listed here are past PDXLAN events.

| Event | Date | Visitors | Total prize pool | Notes |
|---|---|---|---|---|
| PDXLAN Fall ’19 | 11/2019 | 850 | | |
| PDXLAN Spring ’19 | 03/2019 | 850 | | |
| PDXLAN Fall 2018 | 11/2018 | 800 | | |
| PDXLAN 32 | 06/2018 | 500 | | |
| PDXLAN 31 | 02/2018 | 550 | | |
| PDXLAN November | 11/2017 | 550 | | |
| PDXLAN 30 | 07/2017 | 550 | | |
| PDXLAN 29 | 02/2017 | 550 | | |
| PDXLAN November | 11/2016 | 450 | | |
| PDXLAN 28 | 07/2016 | 550 | | |
| PDXLAN 27 | 02/2016 | 550 | | |
| PDXLAN November | 11/2015 | 450 | | |
| PDXLAN 26 | 07/2015 | 550 | | |
| PDXLAN 25 | 02/2015 | 550 | | |
| PDXLAN November | 11/2014 | 400 | | |
| PDXLAN 24 | 07/2014 | 550 | | |
| PDXLAN 23 | 02/2014 | 550 | | |
| PDXLAN November | 11/2013 | 405 | | |
| PDXLAN 22 | 07/2013 | 550 | | |
| PDXLAN 21 | 02/2013 | 550 | | |
| PDXLAN November 2012 | November 2–4, 2012 | 350 | Sold Out | |
| PDXLAN 20 | July 13–16, 2012 | 536 | | Sold Out |
| PDXLAN 19 | Feb 17-20 2012 | 536 | $125,000 | Sold Out |
| PDXLAN November Charity Event | 11/2011 | 360 | | Over 15000 Lbs of Food gathered for the Union Gospel Mission in Portland, Oregon |
| PDXLAN 18 | 07/2011 | 536 | | Sold Out |
| PDXLAN 17 | 01/2011 | 536 | | Sold Out |
| PDXLAN 16.5 | 11/2010 | 336 | | |
| PDXLAN 16 | 07/2010 | 500 | | Sold Out |
| PDXLAN 15 | 01/2010 | 474 | | |
| PDXLAN 14.5 | 11/2009 | 360 | | 4,400 lbs of food raised! |
| PDXLAN 14 | 07/2009 | 500 | | Sold Out |
| PDXLAN 13 | 01/2009 | 500 | | Sold Out |
| PDXLAN 12.5 | 11/2008 | 360 | | Sold Out |
| PDXMMO | 07/2008 | 50 | | |
| PDXLAN 12 | 07/2008 | 500 | | Sold Out |
| PDXLAN 11 | 02/2008 | 500 | | Sold Out |
| PDXLAN 10.5 | 11/2007 | 300 | | |
| PDXLAN 10 | 08/2007 | 500 | | Sold Out |
| PDXLAN 9 | 02/2007 | 500 | | Sold Out |
| PDXLAN 8 | 09/2006 | 500 | | Sold Out |
| PDXLAN 7 | 05/2006 | 500 | | Sold Out |
| PDXLAN 6 | 02/2006 | 500 | | Sold Out |
| PDXLAN 5 | 08/2005 | 800 | | Sold Out |
| PDXLAN 4 | 03/2005 | 500 | | Sold Out |
| PDXLAN 3 | 07/2004 | 620 | | Sold Out |
| PDXLAN 3 Beta | 04/2004 | 120 | | Sold Out |
| PDXLAN 2 | 01/2004 | 500 | | Sold Out |
| PDXLAN 2 Beta | 12/2003 | 40 | | At Backspace in Portland, Oregon |
| PDXLAN 1 | 07/2003 | 500 | | Sold Out |
