= Ponte de Rubiães =

Medieval bridge

Coordinates: 41°54′15″N 8°37′35″W

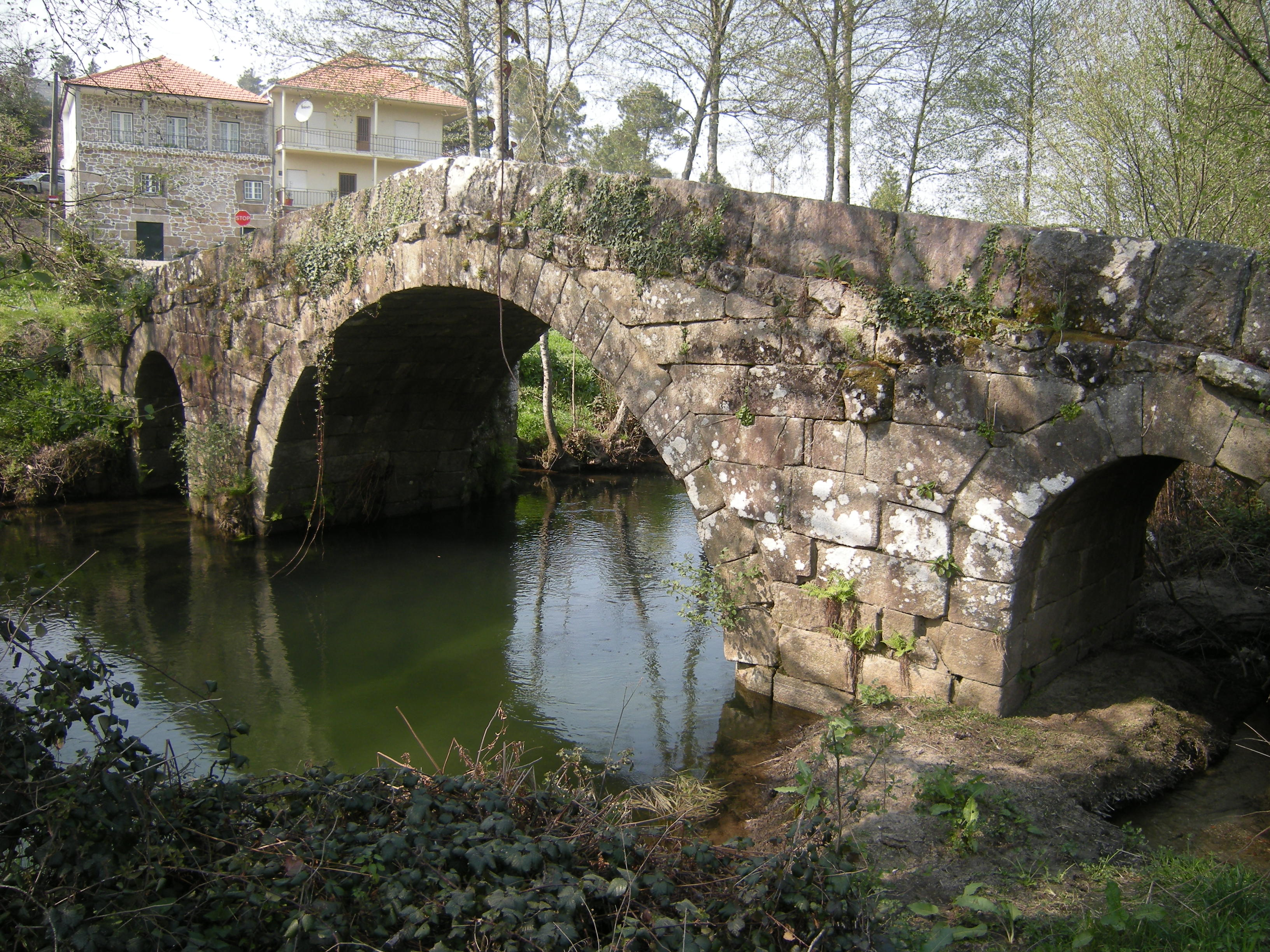

The Ponte de Rubiães is a Roman bridge in the civil parish of Rubiães, Paredes de Coura municipality, northern Portugal. It crosses the small river Coura. It is part of the Portuguese Way of St. James. The bridge was constructed in the 2nd century.

== See also ==
- List of Roman bridges
- List of bridges in Portugal
