= Minho Campus Party =

LAN party organized in Portugal

Minho Campus Party (MCP) was Portugal's first and largest recurring LAN party. It took place in the Minho Province region.

== History ==
The idea of introducing an organized large-scale LAN party to Portugal originated from Professor Altamiro Machado. Professor Machado, known for his pioneering work in computer science education during the 1970s, served as a professor and director of the Department of Information Systems (DSI - Departamento de Sistemas e Informação) at Minho University.

In his pursuit of bringing this concept to life, Professor Machado actively sought support and established contact with the team led by Charles Pinto, who was responsible for organizing a similar event in Spain. Thanks to Professor Machado's initiative, a group of approximately forty Minho students had the opportunity to participate in the Campus Party held in Valencia in 2000. Their participation aimed to gather experience and contribute to the future implementation of a similar event in Portugal.

Tragically, Professor Machado died at the end of March 2001. During the subsequent 2001 event, a dedicated session was organized to pay homage to the professor's invaluable contributions.

Locations by city, all events are held in Portugal, in the Minho region.
	Date start / end	Number of participants	Location	Area (m^{2})
2001	August 29 - September 2	300	Braga, Parque de exposições	
2002	July 31 - August 4	600	Guimarães, Pavilhão Multiusos	
2003	July 30 - August 3	1500	Viana do Castelo, Pavilhão da Associação Industrial do Minho	
2004	July 28 - August 1	1700	Braga, Estádio Municipal	9500

=== MCP 2005 Cancelled ===
Despite its increasing popularity over the previous 4 editions, the 2005 event (expected to be held between 27 and 31 July), was cancelled due to a lack of sponsors.

== Network ==
Cisco Systems has been a steadfast supporter of the Minho Campus Party since its inaugural edition, and continued its partnership for the subsequent four years. Cisco Systems played a crucial role in building the network infrastructure and providing the necessary equipment, representing an investment of over two million dollars. Their support has been instrumental in ensuring the success of the event.

Following Cisco Systems' involvement, ProCurve Networking, a division of HP, took over the responsibility of supplying the network infrastructure and equipment for MCP. Additionally, Portugal Telecom has provided support in establishing the connection for the event, further contributing to its smooth operation.

=== MCP 2004 ===
- 3 (three) ATM, STM-1 (155 Mbit each), connected to the data centre of the Telepac (Portugal Telecom Group) in Porto.
- 15,000 meters of optical-fiber
- 30,000 of network cables

== Areas ==
- Computer games
  - Counter-Strike
  - FIFA Football 2004
  - Halo: Combat Evolved
  - Medal of Honor: Allied Assault
  - Need for Speed: Underground
  - Quake III Arena
  - Rise of Nations
  - Unreal Tournament 2004
  - Warcraft III: The Frozen Throne
  - Age of Mythology
  - Age of Empires II: The Conquerors
- Multimedia
- Linux and Security
- Mobility and Telecommunications

When official competitions didn't exist, participants frequently organized competitions between themselves, of which many became officially recognized by the organization.

== See also ==
- LAN Party
- Minho University
