= Institute for Sustainability and Innovation in Structural Engineering =

Organization

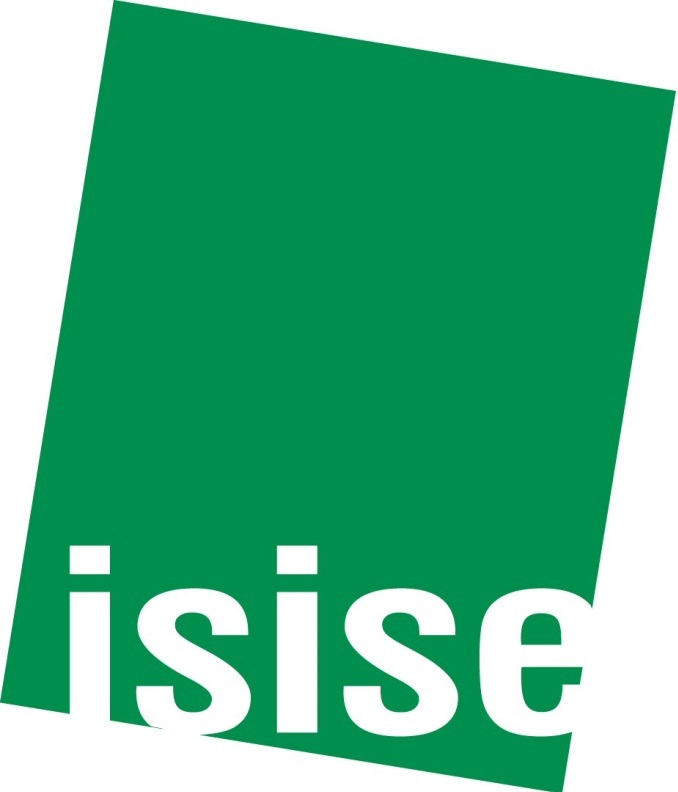
- Abbreviation: ISISE
- Type: Research and development Institute
- Location(s): Coimbra & Braga, Portugal
- Official language: Portuguese, English
- Vice Director: Paulo B. Lourenço
- Director: Luís Simões da Silva
- Affiliations: University of Coimbra University of Minho
- Staff: 36 (2014)
- Website: http://isise.net/

The Institute for Sustainability and Innovation in Structural Engineering (ISISE) is a research unit funded by the Portuguese Foundation for Science and Technology (Fundação para a Ciência e Tecnologia), incorporating University of Coimbra and University of Minho as hosting institutions in Portugal. The Unit is organised in three research groups, addressing the topics of construction technologies in historical materials and masonry, steel and mixed materials, and concrete. In summary, ISISE aims at promoting innovation and sustainability, with a close link to the construction sector industry. The most relevant focus areas include:

- Characterisation of building materials
- Constitutive and structural modelling
- Characterisation of structural behaviour
- Inspection, assessment and monitoring of existing structures
- Safety evaluation of structures
- Development of an integrated life-time structural approach and tools for monitoring of existing structures
- Design of sustainable structures

The Institute is involved in several Advanced Educational Programs, including two Erasmus Mundus International Masters, funded by the European Commission, four PhD programs, as well as 5 advanced MSc programs.

== Evaluation by the Portuguese Foundation for Science and Technology ==
In the latest (2014) Evaluation of R&D Units by FCT, ISISE was rated as Excellent.
