= Fragapalooza =

Annual videogame festival

- Status: Active
- Genre: Video Gaming
- Venue: Leduc Recreation Centre
- Location: Leduc
- Country: Canada
- Inaugurated: 1997
- Filing status: Non-For-Profit
- Website: http://www.fragapalooza.com/

Fragapalooza (also referred to as Frag or Fraga by participants) is an annual video game festival/LAN party that takes place in August currently in Leduc, Alberta, Canada. The name Fragapalooza was derived from the Military Slang "Frag" and "palooza" which is the suffix for any type of named festival or gathering, such as Lollapalooza. Traditionally held in the summer, Fragapalooza runs over a period of four days and lasting 24/7 for most of that time. In 2008, it was Canada's largest LAN party event, having reached approximately 900 attendees at its peak and is still one of the larger gatherings in western Canada.. It is also one of the longest running annual LAN parties in Canada.

== History and background ==
Fragapalooza started in Edmonton, Alberta in 1997 by a group of computer game players playing the game Quake by ID Software. The first event consisted primarily of the first-person shooter game Quake and was held in an old airplane hangar at the Edmonton Municipal Airport. It has since evolved into a larger, annual gathering, drawing attendees mostly from across Canada but has included participants from as far as Asia, Europe, Australia and the United States.

Fragapalooza is a nonprofit event, where proceeds from seat sales and sponsorship are rolled into the event itself to cover prizing, rentals, and various other event costs. The event is also volunteer run which includes many long-time attendants.

This event currently requires participants to "Bring Your Own Computer/Console" (sometimes referred to as BYOC).

Fragapalooza hit its 30-year milestone in 2026.

== Sponsors ==
Fragapalooza has had many notable sponsors including Intel, and NVIDIA who have both previously supported the gaming convention. In 2004, NVIDIA sponsored Fragapalooza offering 20 GeForce FX 5950 Ultra graphics cards to winners and runners-up of the official LAN game tournaments. In late 2002, companies such as Sympatico, Intel, Cisco Systems, ATI, Microsoft, E-Compu-Vison, and Digital Extremes sponsored the 3 day gaming festival billed as Fragapalooza East. In 2007, a professional gaming store, Razer, was invited to sponsor Fragapalooza with the company offering a product prize pool of approximately $600.

== Activities and competitions ==
Besides the opportunity to win prizes in the events official video game tournaments, gamers are given the chance to win "impromptu" competitions. In 2006, during Fragapalooza's 10th anniversary, a dodgeball tournament was arranged. The organizers attempted to break the record for the largest dodgeball game ever at a LAN party. The record, at the time, was held by an event that occurred in Portland that had 200 participants. Crucial technology, a sponsor of the 2006 Fragapalooza event, attempted to break the record with 300 gamers taking part. Bad weather, specifically rain, caused the withdrawal of most of the participants resulting in the record not being broken however the match went ahead with three winners each gaining 2GB of Crucial DDR2 RAM.

Another non-video game competition organized at the Fragapalooza 2006 event was a "crab walk" race across the west side of the Mayfield convention centre. The participants were instructed to crab walk across the centre floor and all the way back again. The three selected winners of the race received free computer hardware from Cooler Master and Memory Express.

Currently the most popular events include the paper airplane toss, Rock-Paper-Scissors event as well as a number of ad-hoc events such as a LAN party themed scavenger hunt.

== Past events ==
All events within Leduc, Alberta or Edmonton, Alberta unless otherwise specified

Year	Location	Approximate Attendance	Official Tournaments	Notes
1997	Hangar at the Municipal Airport	70	Quake	
July 16-19, 1998	Hangar at the Municipal Airport	150	Quake	
1999	Hangar at the Municipal Airport	300	Quake 2	
2000	Hangar at the Municipal Airport	400	Counter-Strike, Quake 3	
2001	Mayfield Inn and Convention Centre	700	Counter-Strike, Quake 3	
2002	Mayfield Inn and Convention Centre	750	Counter-Strike	
2002 (East)	International Center, Mississauga, ON	350	Unreal Tournament 2004	One time east event
2003	Mayfield Inn and Convention Centre	800	Counter-Strike	
2004	Mayfield Inn and Convention Centre	800	Counter-Strike 1.6, Warcraft III: The Frozen Throne, Unreal Tournament 2004	
2005	Mayfield Inn and Convention Centre	800	Counter-Strike 1.6, Counter Strike: Source, Warcraft III: The Frozen Throne	
2006	Mayfield Inn and Convention Centre	800	Counter-Strike 1.6, Counter Strike: Source, Warcraft III, Quake 4	
2007	Mayfield Inn and Convention Centre	800	Counter Strike: Source, Halo 2, Supreme Commander, Unreal Tournament 2004	
2008	Northlands Sportex	500	Call of Duty 4, Counter Strike: Source, Defense of the Ancients, Team Fortress 2, Unreal Tournament 2004	
2009 (Winter)	Holiday Inn, Grand Prairie, Alberta	100	Call of Duty 4	Smaller regional LAN, format slightly different than main event.
2009 (Summer)	DOW Centennial Center, Fort Saskatchewan	450	Counter-Strike 1.6, Call of Duty 4, Unreal Tournament 2004, StarCraft, Rock Band 2	Fort Saskatchewan is a suburb of Edmonton.
2010	Leduc Recreation Center, Leduc, Alberta	320	Call of Duty 4, StarCraft II: Wings of Liberty, Rock Band 2	Leduc, Alberta is a suburb city in the Edmonton Proper
2011	Leduc Recreation Center, Leduc, Alberta	270	StarCraft II: Wings of Liberty	Leduc, Alberta is a suburb city in the Edmonton Proper
2012	Leduc Recreation Center, Leduc, Alberta	300	StarCraft II: Wings of Liberty, Team Fortress 2, League of Legends	Leduc, Alberta is a suburb city in the Edmonton Proper
2013	Leduc Recreation Center, Leduc, Alberta	320	Counter-Strike: Global Offensive, Team Fortress 2, League of Legends, TrackMania	Leduc, Alberta is a suburb city in the Edmonton Proper
2014	Leduc Recreation Center, Leduc, Alberta	325	Call of Duty, StarCraft II: Wings of Liberty, League of Legends, TrackMania	Leduc, Alberta is a suburb city in the Edmonton Proper
2015	Leduc Recreation Center, Leduc, Alberta	260	Counter-Strike: Global Offensive, Super Smash Bros., Battlefield 4, Left 4 Dead 2, StarCraft 2	Leduc, Alberta is a suburb city in the Edmonton Proper
2016	Leduc Recreation Center, Leduc, Alberta	345	League of Legends, Super Smash Bros.	20th Year Event
2017	Leduc Recreation Center, Leduc, Alberta	326	League of Legends, StarCraft 2	Leduc, Alberta is a suburb city in the Edmonton Proper
2018	Leduc Recreation Center, Leduc, Alberta	377	Team Fortress 2, StarCraft 2	Leduc, Alberta is a suburb city in the Edmonton Proper
2019	Leduc Recreation Center, Leduc, Alberta	386	Counter-Strike: Global Offensive, Overwatch, Super Smash Bros., and more	Leduc, Alberta is a suburb city in the Edmonton Proper
2020	Streamed Live on Twitch.tv/FPevents	Peak Viewership Online: 138	Assetto Corsa, Super Smash Bros.	Virtual Only due to Covid
2021	Streamed Live on Twitch.tv/FPevents	Peak Viewership Online: 123	Super Smash Bros.	Virtual Only due to Covid
2022	Fulton Place Community League Streamed Live on Twitch.tv/FPevents	In-person: 50 Peak Viewership Online: 130	Super Smash Bros.	Limited in-person due to Covid
2023	Leduc Recreation Center, Leduc, Alberta Also Online at twitch.tv/FPevents	In-person: ~400 Peak Viewership Online: 180	Counter-Strike 2, Overwatch 2	Leduc, Alberta is a suburb city in the Edmonton Proper
2024	Leduc Recreation Center, Leduc, Alberta Also Online at twitch.tv/FPevents	In-person: ~400 Peak Viewership Online: 250	Counter-Strike 2, Overwatch 2	Leduc, Alberta is a suburb city in the Edmonton Proper
2024	Leduc Recreation Center, Leduc, Alberta Also Online at twitch.tv/FPevents	In-person: ~400 Peak Viewership Online: 250	Counter-Strike 2, Overwatch 2	Leduc, Alberta is a suburb city in the Edmonton Proper
2026	Leduc Recreation Center, Leduc, Alberta Also Online at twitch.tv/FPevents	In-person: ~400 Peak Viewership Online: TBD	30th EVENT ANNIVERSARY Counter-Strike 2, Overwatch 2	Leduc, Alberta is a suburb city in the Edmonton Proper
