= Lan ETS =

- Status: Active
- Genre: Video Gaming
- Venue: École de technologie supérieure
- Location: Montreal
- Country: Canada
- Inaugurated: 2002
- Filing status: Non-profit
- Website: https://lanets.ca/

Lan ETS is a yearly LAN party event held by a student club of the same name from the École de technologie supérieure university in Montreal. It is currently the largest LAN party in Canada and on North America East Coast. In 2013, approximately 1094 gamers attended the event for a chance to win over $18,000 in money and over $25,000 in prizes.

== Activity ==
Born from three university students' passion for network gaming, information technologies, and the search for new challenges, the Lan ETS is the largest event in the field of network gaming in Canada. The main attraction of Lan ETS is its famous video game competitions. The official tournament's line-up usually includes an FPS, an RTS, and a DotA-like.

Participants in Lan ETS are primarily from Québec, particularly the Montréal area, and others come from Ontario and the northeastern United States. Activities held during the event have included a scavenger hunt, cosplay contest, and video game orchestra.

== 2021 ==
Lan ETS 2021 was the 19th event staged by the organization. Unfortunately due to the Covid-19 Pandemic, the team decided to hold the event via live-stream, which lasted 4 weeks. It included animations, streamer showcases, video games tournaments and more.

Those 4 weeks permitted a lot more tournaments and events than usual. Gamers were able to choose between different PC tournaments (Counter Strike: Global Offensive, Fortnite, League of Legends, Valorant and more) and console tournaments (NHL 20, Super Smash Bros. Melee, Super Smash Bros. Ultimate and more).

Many sponsors helped with the event even though there was no booth possible. Notable sponsors/partners include Bell, Redbull, MSI, HyperX and Bestar.

LAN ETS 2021 was an edition of the LAN ETS event held during a period of significant challenges for live events. The event included four weeks of livestreaming on the Bell Canada Twitch channel. The broadcasts recorded 30,104 live views, 19,964 unique viewers, and 1,507 new followers.

== 2013 ==
Lan ETS 2013 was the 11th event staged by the organization and the expectations were high after the successful 10th anniversary the previous year. With over 1094 tickets sold, $17,500 on tournaments prizes and over $25,000 in material prizes, it was the largest Lan Party event ever held by the Lan ETS organization. The enthusiasm surrounding the event was very high, with the last 300 tickets sold in less than 20 minutes.

Gamers were able to choose between five PC tournaments (League of Legends $7,500, Counter Strike: Global Offensive $3,500, StarCraft 2 $3,000, DOTA 2 $2,000 and Team Fortress 2) and two console tournaments (Super Street Fighter IV $750 and NHL13 $750).

Many sponsors were on-site with booths including Plantronics Gamecom, Corsair, CoolerMaster, CIPC and ASUS. Other notable sponsors/partners include Vidéotron, Cisco, Riot Games, TP, Bawls and Twitch.

Lan ETS 2013 featured new experiences for the attendees including a high-quality Twitch broadcast both in French and English, registering over 110,000 views in 48 hours. In addition, the StarCraft 2 and League of legends finals were played live on stage in a 300 seats auditorium.

== 2012 ==
Lan ETS celebrated its tenth anniversary in 2012 with the tenth event by the organization, the Lan ETS 2012. It was the biggest event ever staged by the organization.

With more than 900 seats and $15,000 in tournament prizes, the Lan ETS 2012 established a new record in attendance for a Lan Party in Canada. The event was sold-out in less than two weeks and the official website displayed more than 500,000 unique pages over a two-month period.

The newest tournament, League of Legends, attracted more than 250 players from around North America to become the most important tournament in terms of contestants during the Lan ETS 2012. The event also held a tournament for Counter Strike: Source with more than 150 players and a StarCraft 2 tournament with over 100 players. An NHL 2012 tournament was also happening in the "Lounge" section.

Many sponsors were available during the event with booths to present their products. Corsair, ASUS, Plantronics, Cooler Master and CIPC were amongst the ones to be live at the event. They have given thousands of dollars in prizes to the participants over the years. The Internet connection, with a dedicated 5 Gbit/s speed, was provided by Videotron.

Activities were going on during the entire weekend, including the famous Scavenger Hunt, a contest where players complete various stunts related to geek culture for points. Also, various activities were organized with the sponsors to win material prizes (keyboards, gaming mice, headsets and more).

== Past events ==
Year	Approximate Attendance	Official Tournaments	Notes
2002	213	Counter-Strike 1.6, Quake III, Unreal Tournament, StarCraft	
2003	324	Counter-Strike, Unreal Tournament 2003, Warcraft III	
2004	461	Unreal Tournament 2003, Call of Duty, Rainbow Six: Raven Shield, America's Army, Counter-Strike, Warcraft III: The Frozen Throne	The TV show "Le choc des titans" with Patrice Masbourian and Denis Talbot
2006	581	Counter-Strike 1.6, Counter-Strike Source, Call of Duty 2, Battlefield 2, Quake 4, Warcraft III: The Frozen Throne	
2007	500	Counter-Strike 1.6, Counter-Strike Source, Call of Duty 4, Battlefield 2, Battlefield 2142, Quake 4, Warcraft III: The Frozen Throne	
2008	600	Counter-Strike 1.6, Counter-Strike Source, Call of Duty 4, StarCraft, NHL 2008, Dance Dance Revolution, Defense of the Ancients, Trackmania Nations, Warcraft III: The Frozen Throne	
2009	700	Counter-Strike 1.6, Counter-Strike Source, Call of Duty 4, StarCraft, NHL 2009, Guitar Hero III	
2010	750	Counter-Strike 1.6, Counter-Strike Source, Call of Duty 4	
2010 (World Cyber Games edition)	500	Counter-Strike 1.6, Counter-Strike Source, League of Legend, Quake Live	
2011	800	Counter-Strike 1.6, Counter Strike: Source, StarCraft II: Wings of Liberty, Team Fortress 2, Super Street Fighter IV	
2012	900	Counter Strike: Source, League of Legends, Heroes of Newerth, StarCraft II: Wings of Liberty, NHL 2012	
2013	1094	Counter Strike: Global Offensive, League of Legends, StarCraft II: Wings of Liberty, DOTA 2, Team Fortress 2, SSF4:AE, NHL 13	First Lan Party with over 1000 gamers in Canada.
2014	1276	Counter Strike: Global Offensive, League of Legends, StarCraft II: Heart of the Swarm, DOTA 2, SSF4:AE, NHL 14	
2015	1306	Counter Strike: Global Offensive, League of Legends, StarCraft II: Heart of the Swarm, Hearthstone, Dota 2, Street Fighter, Super Smash Bros	First Lan over 1000 players in North-America offering Gigabits link to all players.
2016	3150	Counter Strike: Global Offensive, League of Legends, StarCraft II: Legacy of the Void, Hearthstone, Dota 2, Street Fighter, Super Smash Bros, Rocket League, Heroes Of The Storm	For the first time in almost 15 years, the Lan ETS moved from the ETS school to Place Bonaventure in order to accommodate over 2,000 gamers.
2017	3200	Counter Strike: Global Offensive, League of Legends, Overwatch, StarCraft II: Legacy of the Void, Hearthstone, Dota 2, Street Fighter, Super Smash Bros, Rocket League, Heroes Of The Storm	15th anniversary of Lan ETS!
2018	3250	Counter Strike: Global Offensive, League of Legends, Overwatch, StarCraft II: Legacy of the Void, Hearthstone, Street Fighter V, Super Smash Bros, Rocket League, DragonBall Fighter Z, Call of Duty WWII	
2019	3700	Counter Strike: Global Offensive, League of Legends, Overwatch, StarCraft II: Legacy of the Void, Hearthstone, Street Fighter V, Super Smash Bros, Super Smash Bros. Melee, Rocket League, DragonBall Fighter Z, Call of Duty WWII	The event moved to the Palais des congrès de Montréal
2020	3800	Counter Strike: Global Offensive, Fortnite, Hearthstone, League of Legends, NHL 20, Overwatch, PlayerUnknown's Battlegrounds, Rainbow Six: Siege, Rocket League, Super Smash Bros. Melee, Super Smash Bros. Ultimate	
2021	N/A	Fortnite, Rainbow Six: Siege, PlayerUnknown's Battlegrounds, Super Smash Bros. Ultimate, League of Legends, Counter Strike: Global Offensive, Rocket League, NHL 20, Overwatch, Super Smash Bros. Melee, Hearthstone, Valorant	The event was held remotely due to Covid-19 Pandemic and lasted for 4 weeks of livestreaming.
2022	1800	League of Legends, GuiltyGearStrive, Counter Strike: Global Offensive, Super Smash Bros. Melee, Super Smash Bros. Ultimate, Rocket League, Street Fighter V, Valorant	The event is back at École de technologie supérieur for its 20th edition.
2023	1900	League of Legends, Counter Strike: Global Offensive, Overwatch 2, Super Smash Bros. Melee, Super Smash Bros. Ultimate, Rocket League, Valorant, Guilty Gear Strive, Melty Blood: Type Lumina	
2024		League of Legends, Valorant, Counter-Strike 2, Rocket League, Call of Duty: Modern Warfare 3, Teamfight Tactics, Trackmania 2020, Super Smash Bros. Ultimate, Super Smash Bros. Melee, Tekken 8, Street Fighter 6, Granblue Fantasy Versus: Rising	The event took place at the Palais des congrès de Montréal
2025		League of Legends, Valorant, Rocket League, Counter-Strike 2, Teamfight Tactics, Street Fighter 6, Tekken 8, Super Smash Bros. Melee, Super Smash Bros. Ultimate	The event took place at the École de technologie supérieure
2026		League of Legends, Valorant, Counter-Strike 2, Rocket League, Teamfight Tactics, Trackmania 2020, GeoGuessr, Super Smash Bros. Ultimate, Super Smash Bros. Melee, Street Fighter 6, Call of Duty: Black Ops 7	The event took place at the École de technologie supérieure Sponsored by Beenox, which is adding Call of Duty

== Executive team ==
Name	Nickname	Title	Status	From	To
Olivier Genest	Sirus103	Electricity Infrastructure & President	Active	2025	Now
Léa Bissonnette-Vir	bizbem	Tournament & Co-president	Active	2025	Now
Nicholas Brisebois	jetry10000	Stream manager	Active	2024	Now
Tristan Clouthier	trifl4sh1	Tournament & Logistic	Active	2024	Now
Henri Cloutier	bécyk	Check-in Responsible & Dev	Active	2025	Now
Félix Fontaine	porte_de_char	Volunteer Responsible	Active	2025	Now
Louis-David Hébert	petitloup12	Electricity Infrastructure & President	Active	2024	Now
Makhlouf Hennine	mak1102	Console & Dev	Active	2024	Now
Loic Higgins	misterlosam	Console	Active	2025	Now
Fabrice Lajoie	redziation	Animation	Active	2024	2026
Gabriel Arcand	el Gab de Repent	Console & Dev	Active	2026	Now
Guillaume Langlois	officialfrenchtoast	Console & Inventory manager & Dev	Active	2024	Now
Victor-Antoine Leblanc	kifoul21	Dev	Active	2025	Now
Xavier Lopez Familiari	kifoul21	Tournament manager	Active	2025	2026
Minh-Tri Max Luong		Stream manager & Graphism	Active	2024	Now
Julien Mateus		Electricity Infrastructure	Active	2025	2026
Aimé Melançon	asutoraru	Infrastructure & Production	Active	2025	Now
Daphne Palaco-Tobia	_bubule_	Communication	Active	2023	2026
Louis Raymond	greatsymphonia	Network & Infrastructure & President	Active	2023	2026
Olivier Renaud	theholi	Animation	Active	2025	Now
Louis-Philippe Séguin	LP	Animation & production	Active	2023	Now
Émile Laforce	Laforce	Caisse	Retired	2024	2026
Nicolas Vigneault	nicktechgame	Treasurer & Inventory manager	Active	2022	Now
Raphaël Vigneault	aykko.dev	Dispatch & Sponsorship	Active	2023	Now
Julien Boisvert-Simard	Julien	Sponsorship & Trésorerie	Retired	2022	2024
Anthony Nguyen	HotFireTony	Communications	Retired	2021	2023
Xavier Ravenelle	Xavier	Network and Infrastructure	Retired	2021	2022
Adam Martin	Tamuki	Volunteers Manager	Retired	2021	2024
Bao Loc Nguyen	BLOC	Animation & Experience	Active	2021	2025
Philippe Côté	Phil	President	Retired	2021	2025
Jennifer Mayorga Rodriguez	Jen	Graphic Designer & Check-in Responsible	Active	2021	Now
Kevin Dyer	Kdye	Financial Manager & Console Tournaments	Retired	2021	2024
Guillaume Drolet	L'redneck	Developer & Volunteers Manager	Retired	2021	2022
Cynthia Boissonneault	Cynthia	Graphic Designer & Tournament Manager	Retired	2021	2023
Hannah Ly	(>'3')>	Sponsorship & Tournament Manager & Logistic & President	Active	2021	2025
Minh-Simon Légaré	HeGotThis	Animation	Retired	2019	2022
Alberto Alvarez	Beto	Communications	Retired	2018	2022
Hugo Vincent	Gohu	Graphic Designer & Streaming Production	Retired	2021	2023
Félix-Olivier Nault	Félix	Equipment Manager	Retired	2019	2023
Simon Legros	Legros	President / Developer	Consultant	2019	2024
Gabrielle Lim	Gaby	Graphic Designer	Retired	2018	2021
Alexanne Cadotte	Alex	Sponsorship and Electrical Infrastructure	Retired	2018	2022
Sébastien Deschambault	Seb	Developer & Tournament Manager	Retired	2018	2021
Thomas Begin	Thomas Le Train	Developer & Tournament Manager, Event Operations Manager	Retired	2018	2022
Alexandre Rousseau	Ale Rousse	Network and Infrastructure	Consultant	2018	Now
Lucas Maurice	Sonic	Network and Infrastructure / Production	Retired	2018	2022
Thierry Michaud	Poutchy	Inventory & Volunteers Manager	Consultant	2017	Now
Steve Mbiele	Fastboyz	Volunteers Manager	Retired	2017	2020
Doan-May Pham	Maytaro	Volunteers Manager	Retired	2018	2020
Robin Richard	Stromboli	Electrical Infrastructure	Consultant	2017	Now
Carl Cordova	Stylz	Sponsorship & Console Tournament Manager	Consultant	2017	Now
Kimberly Thouin	Alpha	MC	Retired	2017	2017
Simon Pelletier	Simonne	Finance	Retired	2017	2020
Catherine Le Jossec	Cathy	Community Manager	Retired	2017	2021
Iman Hassanein	Taz	Animation Coordinator	Retired	2017	2021
Lauréano Mario Steya	Fat32	Network and Infrastructure	Retired	2017	2018
Nicolas Nadeau	gzsierra	Network and Infrastructure	Retired	2017	2020
Charles-André Flamand	Carlito	Network and Infrastructure	Retired	2016	2021
Charles Delmaire	Mada	Inventory Management	Consultant	2017	Now
David Mach	David Mach	Production Coordinator, Event Operations Manager	Retired	2017	2021
Sophie Bernadin-Mercier	shuhala	Graphic Designer & Developer & Tournament Manager	Retired	2016	2021
Jonathan Lalande	Zergov	Developer	Retired	2016	2017
Romain Lacaze	Du coup	Logistics Manager & Event Operations Manager	Consultant	2016	Now
Felix David	AssassinFil	Power Management Assistant	Consultant	2016	2016
Gabriel Périard-Tremblay	Takatsukii	President / Developer & System Administrator	Consultant	2015	Now
Marc-Antoine Hébert	marc	Logistics Manager	Retired	2015	2017
Bach Nguyen	MrChow	Equipment & Volunteers Manager	Consultant	2015	Now
Julie Blais	Ewok	Volunteers Manager	Retired	2014	2016
Simon Gervais-Quiblat	Diego	Sponsorship	Consultant	2014	2019
Vincent Lynch	Inspect	Entertainment Manager	Retired	2014	2017
Pierre Goyette	Bobiolik	Network and Infrastructure	Consultant	2014	2019
Francis Gregoire	TeddyGreg	Production Coordinator	Retired	2014	2019
Alexandre Viau	aviau	Developer & Tournament Manager	Consultant	2014	2018
Laurent Dumont	Bacon	Network and System Administrator	Consultant	2014	2018
Sébastien Gilbert	PouletCuit	Logistic Manager	Retired	2014	2017
Jean-Michel Coupal	Coupal	Network and Wireless Administrator	Retired	2014	2020
Alexandre Malo	Kompressor	Network Architect	Retired	2014	2016
Yves Carrier	DarKZoNe	Console Gaming Manager	Retired	2013	2017
Philippe Nichols	Artemis	Inventory Manager	Retired	2013	2017
Michel Aube	OB	CFO	Retired	2013	2020
David Guay	dggg	Tournament Manager	Retired	2013	2014
Max St-Onge	Spooderman	Sponsorship & Community Manager	Retired	2013	2017
Stéfanie Koy	Koy	Logistics Manager	Retired	2013	2017
Philippe Potvin	TooT	Developer	Retired	2013	2016
Danny Tran	firelx	Developer	Consultant	2013	Now
Bunpa-Henri Tan	ApnuB	Network Manager	Retired	2013	2017
William Lefrançois	xzcute	Sponsorship & Community Manager	Consultant	2011	Now
Pier-Olivier Clément	Riyoth	Cloud Manager	Retired	2011	2017
Vincent Doré-Millet	elemental	Sponsorship & Entertainment Manager	Retired	2012	2014
Kéven L'Archevêque	Guendril	CFO & Tournament Manager	Retired	2010	2017
Nicolas Gauthier	Contak	Graphic & Tournament Manager	Retired	2012	2014
Laurent Dang	Haeky	Lead Developer	Retired	2012	2017
Samuel Tanguay	G-SPoT	Network Manager	Retired	2012	2017
Bernard Poulin	BernieMac / BernPou	Electrical and logistics	Retired	2011	2013
Olivier LeBlanc	Thewhite	Infrastructure/R&D	Retired	2009	2016
Mathieu Rioux	Dohctor	Lead Web Designer	Retired	2009	2013
Marc-André Beaudet-Racine	fokasu	Software/Web Programmer	Retired	2012	2013
Simon Marin	matin	Logistics manager	Consultant	2010	Now
Guillaume F.	phook	Tournament Manager	Retired	2009	2012
Simon Carpentier	SPACEBAR	Volunteers / Infrastructure	Retired	2008	2011
Philippe Larouche	Mr_Spark	Network Manager	Retired	2006	2015
Derek Wuelfrath	dwlfrth	Colonel	Retired	2006	2014
Christof Graf	Chris	Chief Information Officer	Retired	2006	2013
Gabriel Tremblay	init_null	Logistics Manager	Retired	2006	2009
François Wilhelmy	iCe_MoUtOn	Animation & MC	Consultant	2004	Now
Mathieu Deshaies	tamsed	Multimedia Lounge Manager	Retired	2004	2007
Roch Lacroix-Turgeon	Trooper	Founder Member	Retired	2002	2006
Francois Beaudoin	wil	Founder Member	Retired	2002	2005
Jonathan Marcil	LastCall_	Founder Member	Retired	2002	2006
Felix Gauthier	Masterz	Jack Of All Trades	Retired	2003	20xx
Sebastien Gregoire	Merkaba	Tournament manager	Retired	2002	2004
