= Pittsburgh LAN Coalition =

Video gaming organization based in Pittsburgh, Pennsylvania

- Type: Private
- Industry: Video games
- Founded: 2003
- Headquarters: Pittsburgh, Pennsylvania, United States
- Area served: North America
- Website: pittco.org

The Pittsburgh LAN Coalition, Inc. (Pittco) is a video gaming organization which holds LAN parties in Pittsburgh, Pennsylvania, USA.

== Pittco history ==
Pittco was established in December 2003 by several of well-established, smaller LAN parties looking to combine efforts to hold a very large LAN party in the greater Pittsburgh area. Following Iron Storm 1, the first event with 120 attendees, the organization decided to continue and hold semi-yearly events.

Since its establishment, all of its founding member organizations have dissolved, except one (ThinkComputers.org, which no longer holds events).

To date, its largest confirmed event attendance was Iron Storm 8, with "more than 160 people" attending. Iron Storm 13 was said to have brought more than 180 attendees.

== Pittco Logo ==
The Pittco logo has changed many times since the organization's inception. Originally, Pittco used an image of the city of Pittsburgh with "Pittsburgh LAN Coalition" on top of it. The logo eventually changed to the modern one, bearing three pentagons in yellow, blue, and gray to the left of "Pittco". The pentagons reference the "Three Rivers" for which Pittsburgh is known. Its positioning is also a vague reference to the logo of the Pittsburgh Steelers professional American football team, which features three stars to the right of "Steelers".

Pittco logo, 2005

Pittco logo, 2007

Pittco logo, 2008-2016

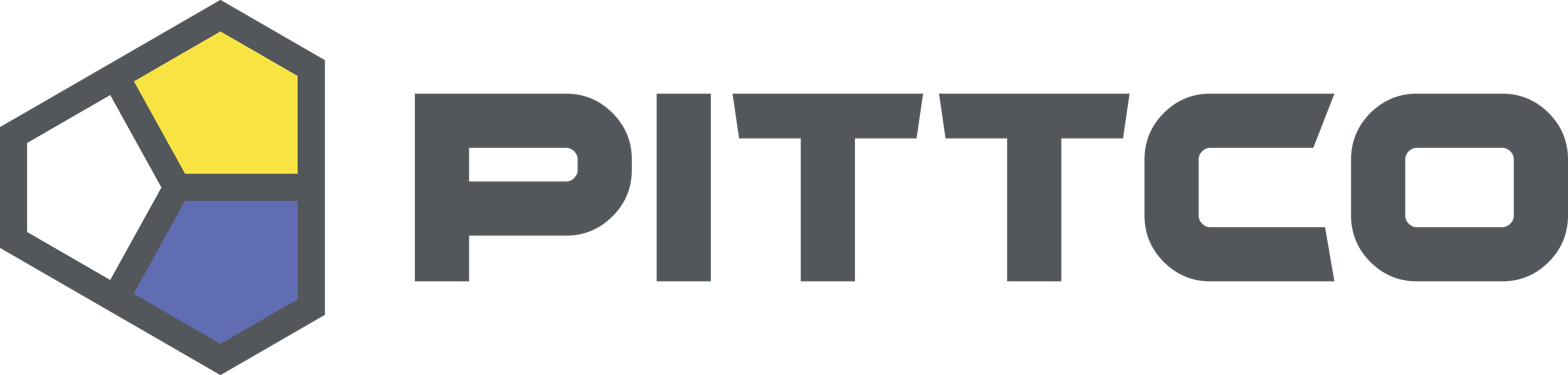
Pittco logo, 2016-Present

More recent use of the logo shows a drop shadow behind it, but the official logo remains without it.

== Event details ==
The name of Pittco's primary event was originally Iron Storm. The name comes from Pittsburgh's notability as a former steel mill center. At its events, Pittco held tournaments for various new and old games, most often featuring Counter-Strike: Source, the Unreal Tournament series, Quake 3, the Call of Duty series, and the StarCraft series. Attendees often organize unofficial tournaments for games. Popular console tournaments also include the Halo series, the Call of Duty series, the Street Fighter series, and Super Smash Bros. Brawl. Iron Storm 8 was the first event that to feature a console game (Halo 3) as featured event, with prizes being given out.

Pittco has also held two smaller events, Lite and PURE. Pittco Lite was so named because a sudden venue conflict for the scheduled Iron Storm 5 caused a last-minute change of location, and approximately half of the registrants were unable to be contacted less than a week before IS5. PURE was so named because it was a "return to classic LAN gaming, without sponsors and with minimal Internet".

There were also many side games and tournaments, called "jackass events" by many attendees. These were meant as time-passers to allow attendees to keep busy while waiting for their game to start.

=== Jackass Tournaments ===
- Karaoke
- Rap Battle
- Human-powered drag racing
- Red Bull chug
- Red Bull relay
- Ice head (who can hold their head underwater the longest in the cooler full of ice water)
- Musical chairs
- "Bring me a" go-for contests
- Clamato mini-games
- Frozen T-shirt (break a frozen shirt from its ice ball and put it on the fastest)
- Vertical/Horizontal Can Stacking

Starting in 2015, Pittco began holding it No Sleep series of events, starting with Revival, followed by Insomnia, Delirium and ending with Restless. All three of those events brought approximately 80 people. No major tournaments were held, but we more focused on a community building atmosphere.

Running since 2011, Pittco has also held its twice-annual suddenLAN series. A more intimate LAN party inspired by the LAN party of the past. With 20-30 people in attendance, the venue is usually more intimate and, according to Pittco's website, is "inspired by the LAN parties held in your parent's basement."

== Past Events ==
Iron Storm is held semi-annually, generally in March and in August.

=== 2004-2009, Pittco of Old ===
==== Iron Storm 1 ====
- February 28–29, 2004 - 120 attendees, held at the Four Points Sheraton by Pittsburgh International Airport

==== Iron Storm 2 ====
- July 31 - Aug 1, 2004 - 115 attendees, held

==== Iron Storm 3 ====
- March 5–6, 2005 - 115 attendees, held at the Ross Township Community Center

==== Iron Storm 4 ====
- August 6–7, 2005 - 105 attendees, held at the Ross Township Community Center

==== Pittco Lite ====
- March 4–5, 2006 - 76 attendees + staff, held at the Beechview Holiday Inn Select; a sudden venue conflict for the scheduled Iron Storm 5 caused a last-minute change of location, and approximately half of the registrants were unable to be contacted

==== Iron Storm 5 ====
- August 12–13, 2006 - 136 attendees, held at the Castle Shannon Fire Hall

==== Iron Storm 6 ====
- March 17–18, 2007 - 141 attendees, held at the Castle Shannon Fire Hall

==== Iron Storm 7 ====
- August 11–12, 2007 - 139 attendees, held at the Castle Shannon Fire Hall

==== Iron Storm 8 ====
- March 15–16, 2008 - 167 attendees, held at the Castle Shannon Fire Hall.

==== Iron Storm 9 ====
- August 17–18, 2008 - ~100 attendees, held at the Castle Shannon Fire Hall; attendees gave conflicting reports as to why the attendance was significantly lower than previous events; most reports involve a less visible on-line advertising campaign

==== Iron Storm 10 ====
- March 21–22, 2009 - 145 attendees, held at the Castle Shannon Fire Hall.

=== 2010-2012, Pittco Modern ===
==== Iron Storm 11 ====
- March 26–28, 2010 - ~100 attendees, held at the Castle Shannon Fire Hall.

==== Iron Storm PURE ====
- August 21–22, 2010 - 86 attendees, held at the Castle Shannon Fire Hall.

==== Iron Storm 12 ====
- March 4–6, 2011 - 156 attendees, 31 sponsors, held at the Castle Shannon Fire Hall.

==== RetroLAN ====
- August 13–14, 2011 - 35 attendees, 3 sponsors (estimated), held at the Castle Shannon Fire Hall.

==== Iron Storm 13 ====
- April 20–22, 2012 - 180 attendees, held at the Castle Shannon Fire Hall. Largest event as of April 2012.

=== 2014-2018 - No Sleep ===
==== Pittco Presents: Revival ====
- September 6–7, 2014 - 89 Attendees, held at the Belle Vernon, Pennsylvania BVAMS Middle School.

==== Pittco Presents: Insomnia ====
- June 27–28, 2015 - 78 Attendees, held at the Belle Vernon, Pennsylvania BVAMS Middle School.

==== Pittco Presents: Delirium ====
- September 10–11, 2016 - 45 Attendees, held at the Belle Vernon, Pennsylvania BVAMS Middle School.

==== Pittco Presents: Restless ====
- September 15–16, 2018 - 42 Attendees, held at the Belle Vernon, Pennsylvania BVAMS Middle School.
