= Cyber Snipa =

Computer peripheral brand

- Product type: Peripherals, Gaming Mice, Keyboards, Webcams, Headphones
- Current owner: Cyber Sport Pty Ltd
- Country: Australia
- Introduced: 1998
- Markets: World
- Previous owners: Flexiglow Hong Kong Pty Ltd
- Website: www.cybersnipa.com

Cyber Snipa is a brand of specialised computer peripherals and equipment designed expressly for gaming. The brand originated in March 2004 when Flexiglow Hong Kong Pty Ltd introduced the Cyber Snipa Gamepad. Subsequent to the sale of Flexiglow Hong Kong in July 2007, Cyber Snipa products are currently manufactured by Cyber Sport Pty Ltd.

Despite its success in the past CyberSnipa filed for bankruptcy in 2016 and closed its website by the end of 2016.

== History ==
The development of the Cyber Snipa brand began in 1998 when gamers employed as engineers at Flexiglow saw a need for specialised gaming equipment in a fast-growing market and started designing the Gamepad with the intention of improving performance in FPS games. Since the Gamepads release in 2005 the range of products marketed under the Cyber Snipa brand has grown to include gaming mice, mousepads, keyboards, headsets, webcams, flash memory devices and gaming apparel. In 2006 the Cyber Snipa brand was made available for purchase and offices were opened in both the US and Europe. In February 2008, Flexiglow Pty Ltd was bought out by the Australian technology development studio Cyber Sport Pty Ltd. Cyber Sport has since continued to release new Cyber Snipa products alongside its other brands, most recently the Stinger gaming mouse.

== Products ==
=== Keyboards ===
The Gamepad was the first product to be released under the Cyber Snipa brand name. It was conceived with portability and space-management in mind and aims to improve in-game control. A new version featuring more keys and a better ergonomic layout, the Game pad V2, has since superseded the original.

The Warboard is a full size keyboard which was released in late 2007. It features 10 dual mode programmable buttons and anti-ghosting key architecture. The Warboard has been cited as a useful MMORPG keyboard in particular due to the macro software functions.

=== Mice ===
The Intelliscope was the first gaming mouse to be developed and marketed under the Cyber Snipa brand. The Intelliscope laser mouse features on-the-fly switchable dpi (with a maximum of 2400) and operates at 10,800 frames per second.

The S.W.A.T. mouse features a 1600dpi switchable laser engine and operates at 6,400 frame/s. The S.W.A.T. mouse has a lower price point than the Intelliscope despite possessing 32kb of onboard memory and Macro A.I. software.

The Stinger Mouse, released in February 2008, is the latest and most technologically advanced mouse in the Cyber Snipa line. It features an on-the-fly switchable 3200dpi laser engine operating at 7000 frame/s, a superfast report rate of 1000 Hz, onboard memory with macro software and a removable weight system.

=== Mouse pads ===
A variety of different high performance mouse pads have been released under the Cyber Snipa brand name, the most prominent of which are the Tracer illuminated mouse pad and the Micro-fibre Mouse Mat.

=== SONAR Headsets ===
In early 2008 the Cyber Snipa range was expanded to include two types of gaming headsets; the Sonar 2.0 and Sonar 5.1. The Sonar 5.1 headset in particular has received positive reviews from the online gaming community. It features true directional surround sound with 8 individual speakers on separate channels and 3D audio software.
