= Bellville Velodrome =

Multi-purpose indoor velodrome in Bellville, Cape Town, South Africa

Techtonic Velodrome
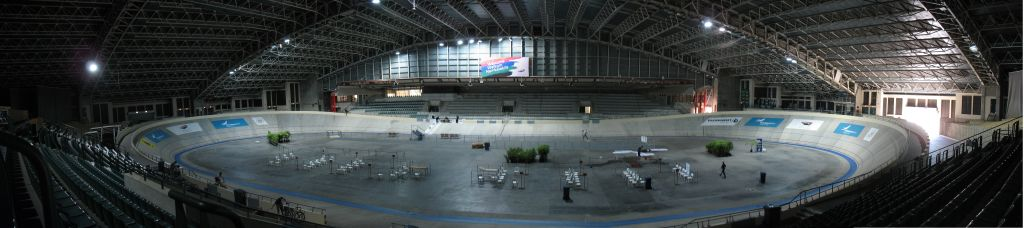
- Techtonic Velodrome, as seen from the stands
- Interactive map of Techtonic Velodrome
- Full name: Techtonic Velodrome
- Former names: Bellville Velodrome
- Address: Bellville, City of Cape Town, Western Cape, South Africa
- Coordinates: 33°52′47.25″S 18°38′0.64″E
- Capacity: 7,800

Construction
- Built: 1997; 29 years ago
- Opened: 1997; 29 years ago

The Techtonic Velodrome is a 250-meter, multi-purpose indoor velodrome located in Bellville, in the City of Cape Town, South Africa. In the past, the venue served as Greater Cape Town's main concert venue, and has now been replaced by the Cape Town Stadium. Its maximum capacity for cycling competitions ranges from 5,000 to 8,000.

The last velodrome race was November 13, 2026. The veldrome will be redeloped for other commercial uses.

== Construction ==
Initially developed for Cape Town's bid for the 2004 Olympics, the velodrome hosted the World Cycling Federation Championships in 1999. The project was completed in nine months from inception.

The Velodrome features an acoustically treated soffit lining for purposes of hosting music and other entertainment events.

The building was designed as a phased development with a seating capacity on completion of up to 6,000 seats (existing seats currently are 2,500 and event organisers can provide the balance to bring it up to 6,000 seats) and a standing capacity of 7,800. Phase 1 is complete and various designs exist as well as development proposals for the surrounding property to support the functions of the Velodrome.

== Events ==
On 5 September 2007, WWE's RAW SummerSlam Tour took place with over 7,000 fans in attendance.

The velodrome hosted the 2007 UCI "B" World Championship in June 2007.

It was also the venue for the 2008 UCI Junior World Championships, which was awarded to the city of Cape Town.

It was also the home of the Organised Chaos LAN Party, South Africa's biggest monthly gaming event. Organised Chaos moved to a different venue after the commencing of The Galleria Development early in 2012, but still make use of the Bellville Velodrome for large events from time to time.

== The Galleria Development ==
At a Council meeting on 28 October 2009, approval was given for the City of Cape Town to award a R3 billion tender to establish retail, business, residential, hotel and conference facilities on an 11.5 ha property in the Bellville Velodrome precinct.

The tender was won by Devmet Property Developments, a consortium of Devmark Property Group (Pty) Limited and Mettle Property Group (Pty) Limited, through a competitive bidding process that lasted more than two years. Mettle Property Group is 49% owned by Metropolitan Capital, an associated company of the Metropolitan Group, and is a level eight contributor in terms of Broad Based Black Economic Empowerment (BBBEE).

The development is based on a spine 'Galleria' that will provide the circulation and connection to all the facilities. Parking with entrances at various levels and locations will be provided to connect the hotel, conference and sporting facilities with the retail, business and residential components.

Devmet Property Developments has put together a group of companies and management models that offer a suitable range of skills and experience in property development, property management, financial oversight, facilities management and events management. They incorporate and provide local and international experience, strategic partnerships and networks, and innovative technologies, designs and processes. The group includes Devmet, Big Concerts, the High Performance Sports Centre and several smaller, specialist firms," Gelderbloem added.

The overall capacity of the venue will be increased to 18,000 with the upgrade to the velodrome and adjoining athletics venue considered as part of Phase 1.

It was initially envisaged that the development will be completed by 2014, however, as of November 2013, no construction work has taken place. There was some concern as to the developments effect on the surrounding suburbs as a road will need to be built through local suburbs and parks, but after public hearings the plan to build a road was withdrawn.

== Concerts ==
- Jay-Z
- Rihanna
- Toto
- Jimmy Eat World
- 50 Cent
- P!nk
- Kendrick Lamar
- The Offspring
- Counting Crows
- Bryan Adams
- The Cranberries
- Faithless
- The Prodigy
- LIVE
- Alanis Morissette
- Avril Lavigne
- Lil Wayne
- David Gray
- Billy Joel
- Mary J Blige
- Kanye West
- Groove Armada
- R.E.M.
- Sting
- Roger Waters
- Armin Van Buuren
- Westlife
- Ronan Keating
- Simply Red
- Bruce Springsteen
- Metallica
- Sixto Rodriguez

== See also ==
- List of cycling tracks and velodromes
- List of indoor arenas in South Africa
