= University of Minho =

Public university in Portugal

- Universidade do Minho
- Motto: Res ipsas examinare: versus est sciendi modus
- Motto in English: Examining things in themselves: this is the true way of knowing
- Type: Public university
- Established: 1973
- Endowment: €148.4 million per year
- Rector: Pedro Arezes (since 2025)
- Academic staff: 1,033
- Administrative staff: 645
- Students: 19,632 (2020)
- Undergraduates: 13,022
- Postgraduates: 4,910
- Doctoral students: 1,700
- Location: Braga (rectorate), Guimarães, Portugal; 41.5608°N 8.3968°W
- Campus: Multiple sites
- Research labs: 31
- Colors: Red and White
- Website: www.uminho.pt

University rankings

Global – Overall
- ARWU World: 401–500 (2023)
- QS World: =566 (2026)
- THE World: 601–800 (2024)
- USNWR Global: =507 (2023)

The University of Minho (Portuguese: Universidade do Minho) is a public university in Minho Province, Portugal. It has multiple campuses in the cities of Braga and Guimarães.

== History ==
The University of Minho, founded in 1973, is one of the then named "New Universities" that, at that time, deeply changed the landscape of higher education in Portugal.

Located in the region of Minho, known for its significant economic activity and by the youth of its population, the University of Minho is playing the role of development agent in the region.

With over 21,000 students (42% of which are postgraduate students) and with about 1747 professors and 738 employees, UM is one of the largest Portuguese universities.

As of 2013, the University of Minho appears on the ranking of Times Higher Education as one of the 100 best universities of the world under the age of 50, occupying the 76th position. In 2014, it placed 75th overall. The university is widely regarded for the number of citations of its published papers.

In the Times Higher Education World University Rankings of 2015, the university was ranked between 351 and 400 worldwide.

== Campuses ==
The university is divided into the following campuses:

- Largo do Paço (rectorate), in Braga
- Campus of Gualtar, in Braga
- Convento dos Congregados, in Braga
- Campus of Azurém, in Guimarães
- Campus of Couros, in Guimarães

== Schools ==
- School of Architecture (EA)
- School of Letters, Arts and Human Sciences (ELACH)
- School of Psychology (EP)
- Institute of Education (IE)
- Institute of Social Sciences (ICS)
- School of Economics and Management (EEG)
- School of Engineering (EE)
- School of Law (ED)
- School of Sciences (EC)
- School of Medicine (EM)

== List of research units ==
- Institute for Sustainability and Innovation in Structural Engineering

== See also ==
- Higher education in Portugal
- List of universities in Portugal
- Minho Campus Party
- Deucalion (supercomputer)
