= Galegos Parish =

Galegos Parish may refer to:

- Galegos (Santa Maria), a parish in Barcelos Municipality, Portugal
- Galegos (São Martinho), a parish in Barcelos Municipality, Portugal
- Galegos (Penafiel), a parish in Penafiel Municipality, Portugal
- Galegos (Póvoa de Lanhoso), a parish in the municipality of Póvoa de Lanhoso, Portugal
