= Galegos =

Galegos may refer to:

- Galegos (Santa Maria), a parish in the municipality of Barcelos, Portugal
- Galegos (São Martinho), a parish in the municipality of Barcelos, Portugal
- Galegos (Penafiel), a parish in the municipality of Penafiel, Portugal
- Galegos (Póvoa de Lanhoso), a parish in the municipality of Póvoa de Lanhoso, Portugal
- The name for the Galician people in the Galician language

== See also ==
- Galician (disambiguation)
