= Ponte de Mem Gutierres =

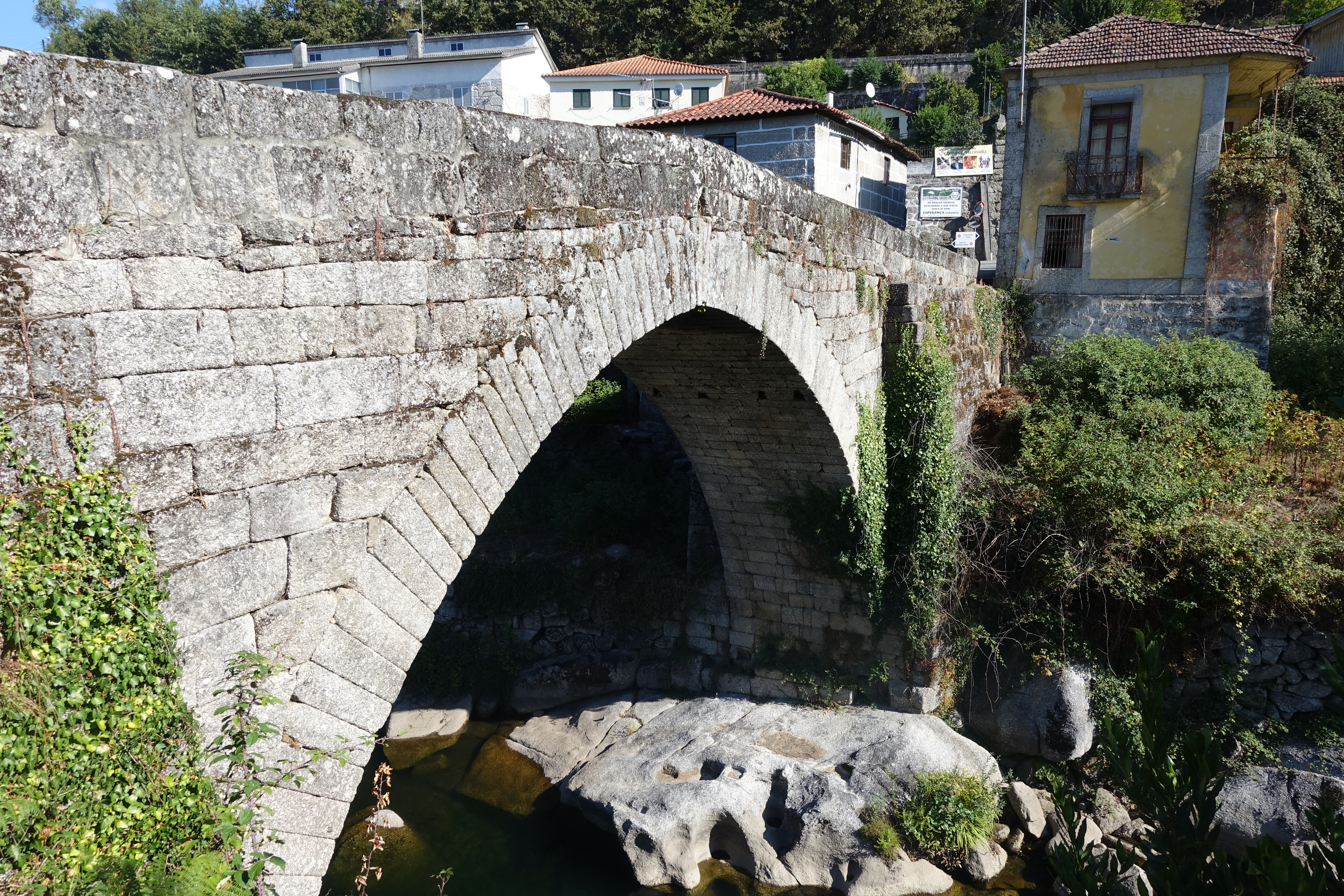
- Coordinates: 41°34′36.5″N 8°09′58.5″W
- Locale: Portugal, Póvoa de Lanhoso, Esperança e Brunhais
- Official name: Ponte de Mem Gutierres
- Other name(s): Ponte de Esperança

Characteristics
- Design: Medieval
- Material: Granite

History
- Designer: unknown
- Construction start: 14th century
- Construction end: 15th century

Ponte de Mem Gutierres is a Romanesque bridge in Portugal, located in the civil parish of Esperança e Brunhais, in the municipality of Póvoa de Lanhoso. Crossing the river Ave in the district of Braga, the bridge connects either margin lined with picturesque houses.

== History ==
Limited by the Serra do Carvalho, Serra da Cabreira and Serra do Gerês, the bridge is situated in a cross-roads territory that links Braga with Chaves, across the Serra do Gerês, and between Braga and Guimarães. Its central location was important in groups that lived between this region, in particular during the Iron Age and Roman period of occupation. Many of the buildings that surround margins attest to the age associated with these periods.

Among many of the medieval structures, the Ponte de Mem Gutierres or Ponte de Esperança (as it is also known) was probably built between 14th and 15th century.

Due to its age and regional importance, it was included in the first Portuguese document to classify old structures as National Monuments in 1910.

In 1976, there was work to repair the pavement and reinforcements, with a project in 1977 to conserve and consolidate the arch.

== Architecture ==
The structure is a single arch bridge, consisting a vaulted arc, reinforced on either side of the margin. It has very narrow, long staves with irregular extrados, and reinforced with rectangular abutments. Constructed in granite stonework, the pavement was asphalted.

== See also ==
- List of bridges in Portugal
