= Travassos =

Travassos may refer to:

Places

- Travassós (postal code: 4820), a parish in the Fafe municipality, Portugal
- Travassos (parish) (postal code: 4830), a parish in the Póvoa de Lanhoso municipality, Portugal
- Estádio Palma Travassos, a multi-use stadium in Ribeirão Preto, Brazil

People

- Diogo Gonçalves de Travassos (1390s-1449), a Portuguese nobleman
- José Travassos Valdez, 1st Count of Bonfim (1787–1862), a Portuguese soldier and statesman
- Lauro Travassos (1890–1970), a Brazilian entomologist, father of Haroldo Travassos
- Haroldo Travassos (1922–1977), a Brazilian ichthyologist, son of Lauro Travassos
- José Travassos (1926–2002), Portuguese football forward
- Diogo Travassos (born 2004), Portuguese football right-back
