= Lanhoso =

- Civil parish
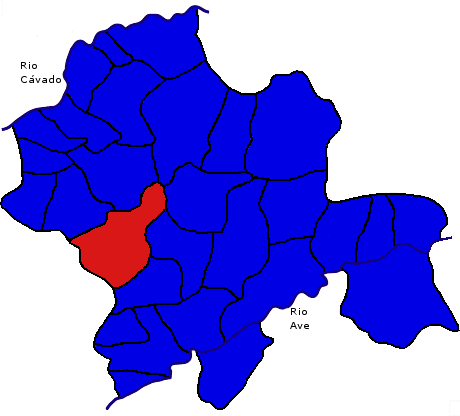
- Country: Portugal
- Region: Norte
- Intermunic. comm.: Ave
- District: Braga
- Municipality: Póvoa de Lanhoso

Area
  - Total: 6.47 km^{2} (2.50 sq mi)

Population (2011)
  - Total: 742
  - Density: 115/km^{2} (297/sq mi)
- Time zone: UTC+00:00 (WET)
  - Summer (DST): UTC+01:00 (WEST)

Lanhoso is a Portuguesa Freguesia in the Municipality of Póvoa de Lanhoso, it has an area of 6.47 km^{2} and 742 inhabitants (2011).

== Population ==
Population of Lanhoso (1864 – 2011)
1864	1878	1890	1900	1911	1920	1930	1940	1950	1960	1970	1981	1991	2001	2011
	1 247	1 229	1 343	1 521	1 368	720	820	796	754	614	639	671	690	742
