= Vilela (Póvoa de Lanhoso) =

- Civil parish
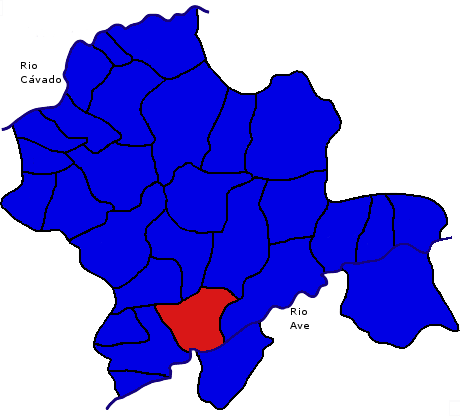
- Country: Portugal
- Region: Norte
- Intermunic. comm.: Ave
- District: Braga
- Municipality: Póvoa de Lanhoso

Area
  - Total: 4.18 km^{2} (1.61 sq mi)

Population (2011)
  - Total: 615
  - Density: 150/km^{2} (380/sq mi)
- Time zone: UTC+00:00 (WET)
  - Summer (DST): UTC+01:00 (WEST)

Vilela is a Portuguese Freguesia in the Municipality of Póvoa de Lanhoso, with an area of 4.18 km^{2} and 615 inhabitants (2011). The Freguesia has a population density of 147.1 people per km^{2}.

== Population ==
Population of Vilela
| 1864 | 1878 | 1890 | 1900 | 1911 | 1920 | 1930 | 1940 | 1950 | 1960 | 1970 | 1981 | 1991 | 2001 | 2011 |
| 573 | 557 | 510 | 555 | 568 | 581 | 597 | 743 | 722 | 785 | 647 | 660 | 668 | 674 | 615 |
