= Taíde =

- Civil parish
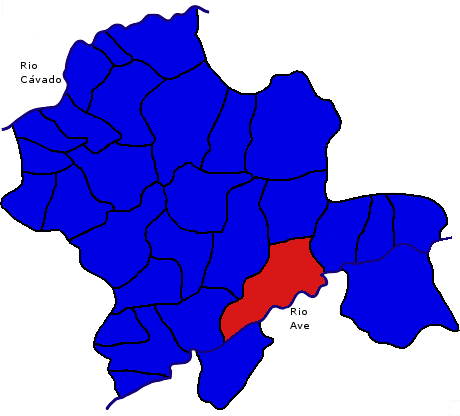
- Country: Portugal
- Region: Norte
- Intermunic. comm.: Ave
- District: Braga
- Municipality: Póvoa de Lanhoso

Area
  - Total: 7.34 km^{2} (2.83 sq mi)

Population (2011)
  - Total: 1,613
  - Density: 220/km^{2} (569/sq mi)
- Time zone: UTC+00:00 (WET)
  - Summer (DST): UTC+01:00 (WEST)

Taíde is a Portuguese Freguesia in the municipality of Póvoa de Lanhoso. It has an area of 7.34 km² and 1,613 inhabitants, (2011).

== Population ==
Population of Taíde
1864	1878	1890	1900	1911	1920	1930	1940	1950	1960	1970	1981	1991	2001	2011
1 133	1 133	1 143	1 088	1 128	1 115	1 218	1 301	1 483	1 600	1 505	1 748	1 705	1 569	1 613
