= Sobradelo da Goma =

- Civil parish
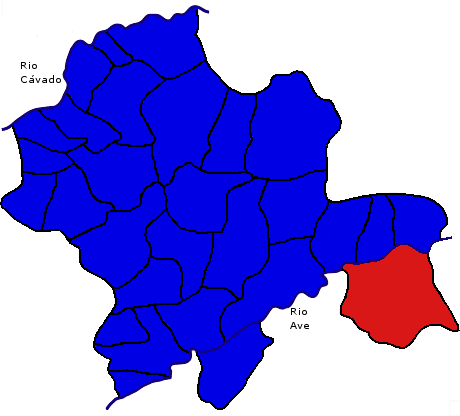
- Country: Portugal
- Region: Norte
- Intermunic. comm.: Ave
- District: Braga
- Municipality: Póvoa de Lanhoso

Area
  - Total: 10.23 km^{2} (3.95 sq mi)

Population (2011)
  - Total: 794
  - Density: 77.6/km^{2} (201/sq mi)
- Time zone: UTC+00:00 (WET)
  - Summer (DST): UTC+01:00 (WEST)
- Website: www.jf-sobradelodagoma.pt

Sobradelo da Goma is a Portuguese Freguesia in the municipality of Póvoa de Lanhoso, it has an area of 10.23 km² and 794 inhabitants (2011). Its population density is 77.6 people per km².

== Population ==
Population of Sobradelo da Goma
1864	1878	1890	1900	1911	1920	1930	1940	1950	1960	1970	1981	1991	2001	2011
1 050	934	979	1 029	1 205	1 203	1 239	1 413	1 351	1 381	1 581	1 469	1 115	1 105	794
