= Fonte Arcada e Oliveira =

- Civil parish
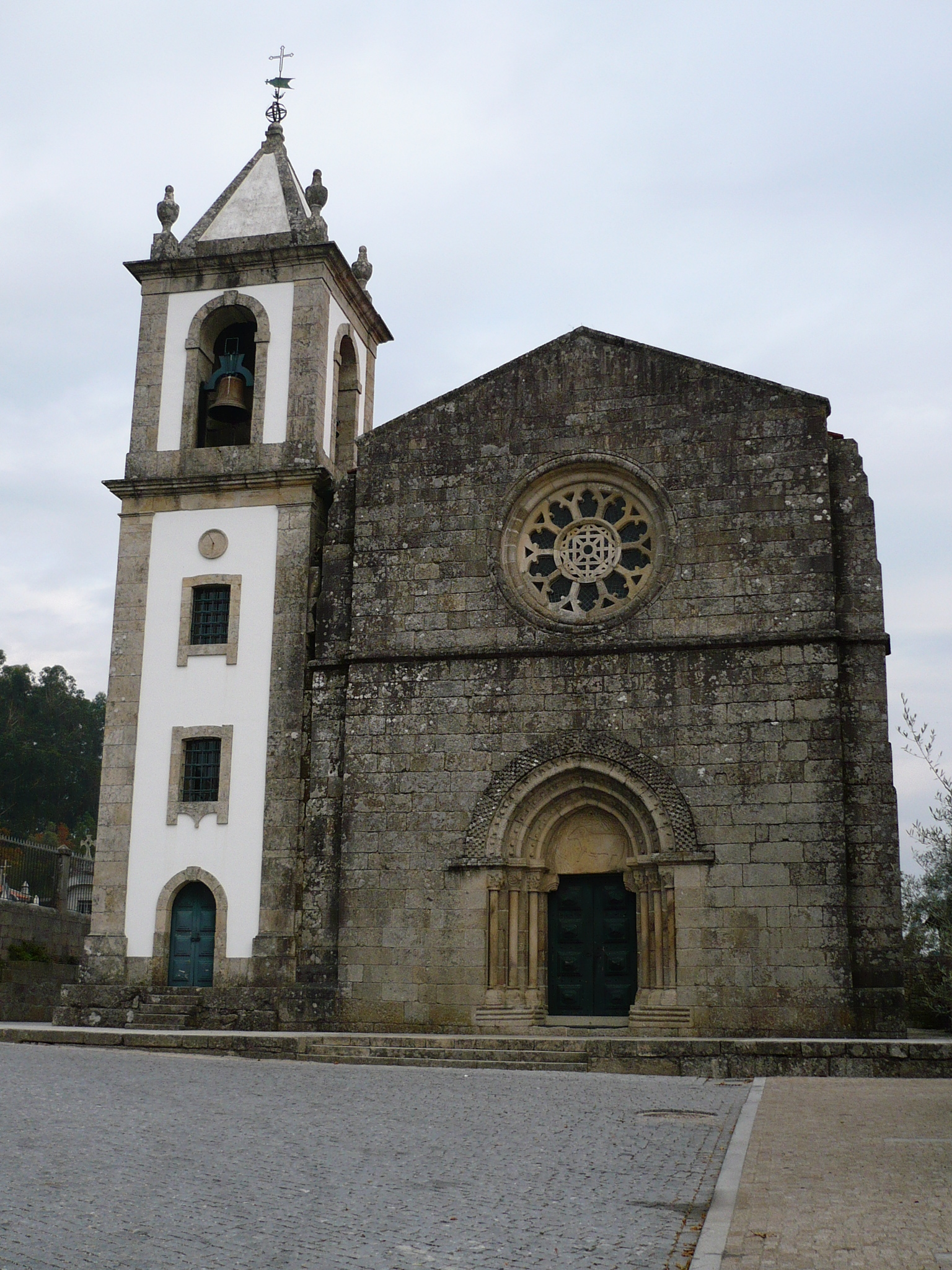
- Front of the Church of Fontarcada

- Location in Portugal
- Coordinates: 41.579°N 8.248°W
- Country: Portugal
- Region: Norte
- Intermunic. comm.: Ave
- District: Braga
- Municipality: Póvoa de Lanhoso

Area
  - Total: 11.06 km^{2} (4.27 sq mi)

Population (2011)
  - Total: 1,672
  - Density: 151.2/km^{2} (391.5/sq mi)
- Time zone: UTC+00:00 (WET)
  - Summer (DST): UTC+01:00 (WEST)

Fonte Arcada e Oliveira is a freguesia ("civil parish") in the municipality of Póvoa de Lanhoso, northern Portugal. It was formed in 2013 by the merger of the former parishes Fonte Arcada e Oliveira. The population in 2011 was 1,672, in an area of 11.06 km².

The village Fonte Arcada (also known as Fontarcada) was the birthplace of Maria da Fonte, leader of the Revolution of Maria da Fonte. Until the start of the 19th century it formed a couto of its own. Its parish church is the church of Fontarcada.
