= Santo Emilião =

- Civil parish
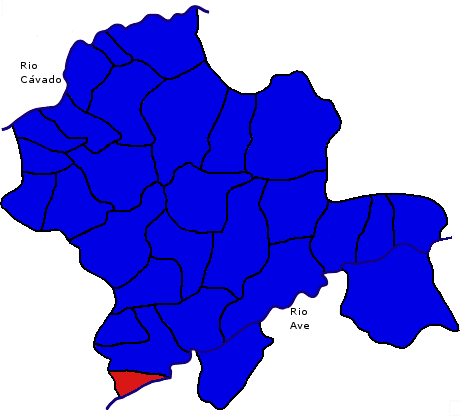
- Coordinates: 41°31′48″N 8°17′35″W
- Country: Portugal
- Region: Norte
- Intermunic. comm.: Ave
- District: Braga
- Municipality: Póvoa de Lanhoso

Area
  - Total: 1.74 km^{2} (0.67 sq mi)

Population (2011)
  - Total: 890
  - Density: 510/km^{2} (1,300/sq mi)
- Time zone: UTC+00:00 (WET)
  - Summer (DST): UTC+01:00 (WEST)

Santo Emilião is a Portuguese Freguesia in the municipality of Póvoa de Lanhoso, it has an area of 1.74 km^{2} and 890 inhabitants (2011). It has a population density of 510 people per km.²

== Population ==
Population of Santo Emilião (1864 – 2011)
1864	1878	1890	1900	1911	1920	1930	1940	1950	1960	1970	1981	1991	2001	2011
425	446	448	453	482	479	475	707	633	739	762	824	801	980	890
