= Póvoa de Lanhoso (parish) =

- Civil parish
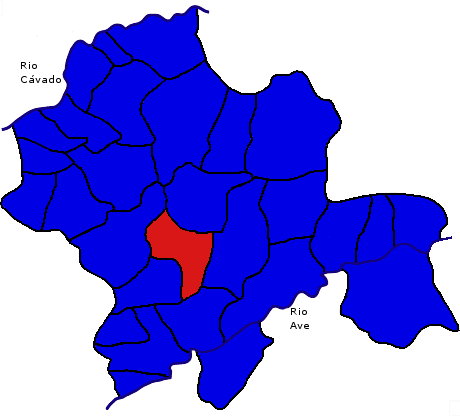
- Country: Portugal
- Region: Norte
- Intermunic. comm.: Ave
- District: Braga
- Municipality: Póvoa de Lanhoso

Area
  - Total: 5.62 km^{2} (2.17 sq mi)

Population (2011)
  - Total: 5,052
  - Density: 900/km^{2} (2,300/sq mi)
- Time zone: UTC+00:00 (WET)
  - Summer (DST): UTC+01:00 (WEST)

Póvoa de Lanhoso (alternatively Nossa Senhora do Amparo) is a Portuguese Freguesia in the Municipality of Póvoa de Lanhoso, with an area of 5.62 km^{2} and 5052 inhabitants (2011).

== Population ==
Population of Póvoa de Lanhoso (Nossa Senhora do Amparo) (1930–2011)
| 1930 | 1940 | 1950 | 1960 | 1970 | 1981 | 1991 | 2001 | 2011 |
| 1 558 | 1 888 | 1 762 | 1 849 | 1 879 | 2 514 | 3 548 | 4 602 | 5 052 |
