= Calvos Oak =

Tree in Póvoa de Lanhoso, Portugal

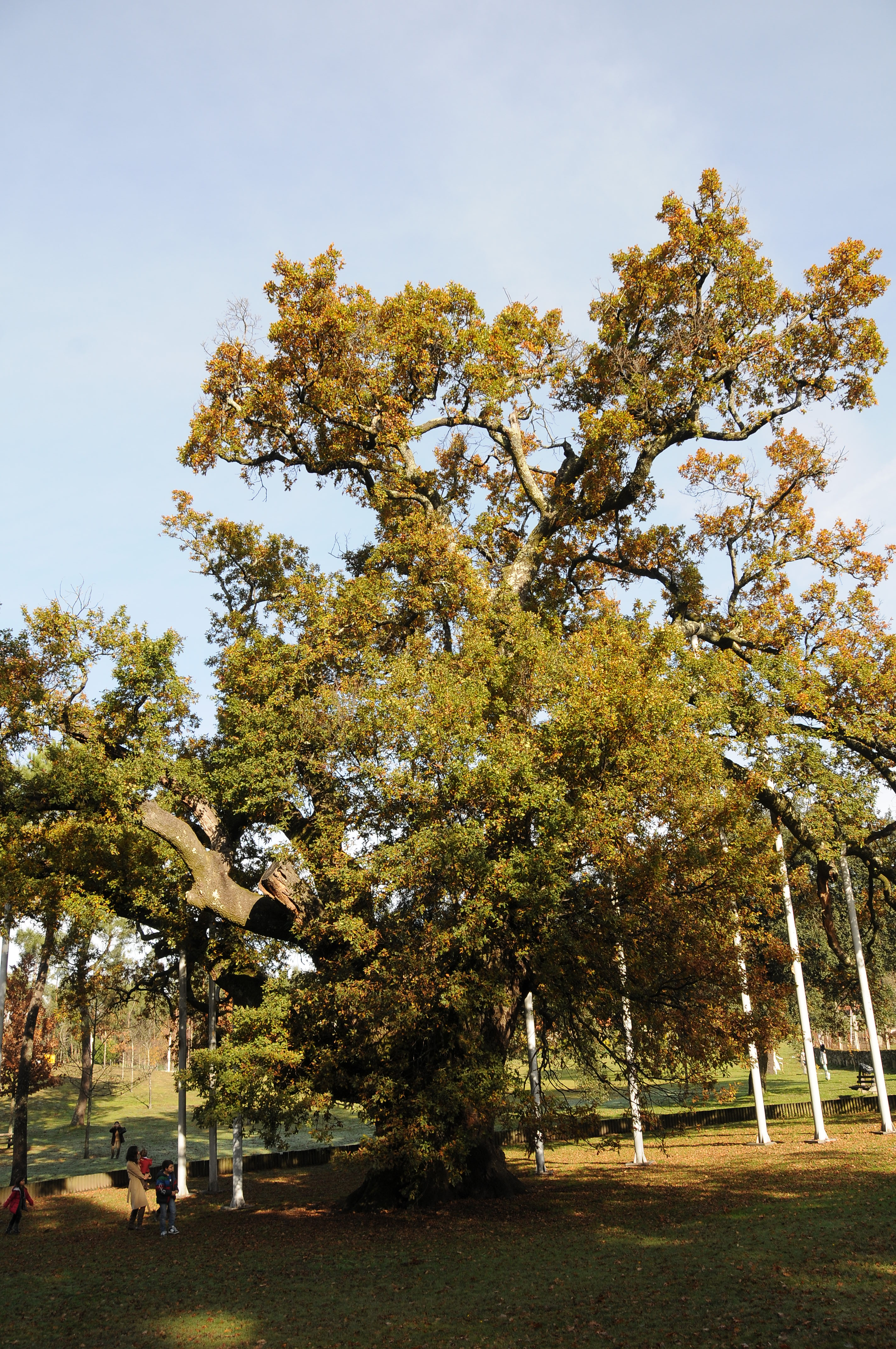
- Calvos Oak
- Species: European oak (Quercus robur)
- Location: Calvos, Póvoa de Lanhoso, Portugal
- Coordinates: 41°35′46″N 8°16′07″W
- Date seeded: 1510
- Custodian: Instituto da Conservação da Natureza e das Florestas (ICNF)

The Calvos Oak (Portuguese: Carvalho de Calvos) is a European oak located in the parish of Calvos, in Póvoa de Lanhoso, Portugal. It is estimated to be about 510 years old, as of 2015 it stands 30 m (98 ft) tall and had a diameter at breast height of 7.62 m (25 ft) with a canopy diameter of 37 m (121 ft). It is considered to be the oldest oak in the Iberian Peninsula.
