= Rendufinho =

- Civil parish
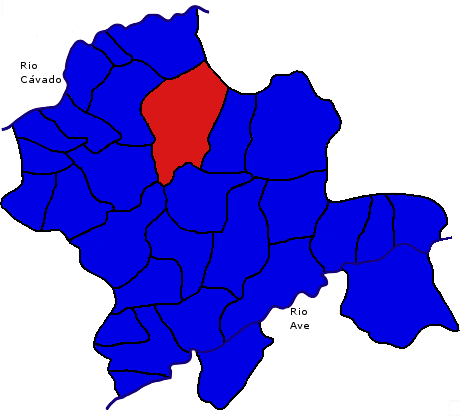
- Country: Portugal
- Region: Norte
- Intermunic. comm.: Ave
- District: Braga
- Municipality: Póvoa de Lanhoso

Area
  - Total: 8.86 km^{2} (3.42 sq mi)

Population (2011)
  - Total: 736
  - Density: 83.1/km^{2} (215/sq mi)
- Time zone: UTC+00:00 (WET)
  - Summer (DST): UTC+01:00 (WEST)

Rendufinho is a Portuguese Freguesia in the municipality of Póvoa de Lanhoso, it has an area of 8.86 km² and 736 inhabitants (2011). And a population density of 83.1 people per km².

== Population ==
Population of Rendufinho (1864 – 2011)
1864	1878	1890	1900	1911	1920	1930	1940	1950	1960	1970	1981	1991	2001	2011
683	646	586	635	617	658	673	710	790	893	825	723	779	748	736
