= Geraz do Minho =

- Civil parish
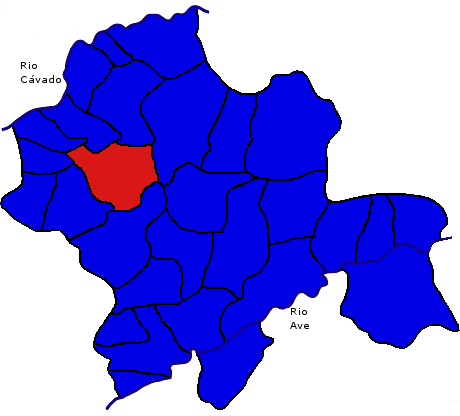
- Country: Portugal
- Region: Norte
- Intermunic. comm.: Ave
- District: Braga
- Municipality: Póvoa de Lanhoso

Area
  - Total: 4.33 km^{2} (1.67 sq mi)

Population (2011)
  - Total: 521
  - Density: 120/km^{2} (312/sq mi)
- Time zone: UTC+00:00 (WET)
  - Summer (DST): UTC+01:00 (WEST)
- Website: www.jf-gerazdominho.pt

Geraz do Minho is a Portuguese Freguesia in the municipality of Póvoa de Lanhoso, It has an area of 4.33 km^{2} and 521 inhabitants (2011). It has a population density of 120 people per km^{2}.

== Population ==
Population of Geraz do Minho (1864 – 2011)
1864	1878	1890	1900	1911	1920	1930	1940	1950	1960	1970	1981	1991	2001	2011
645	628	620	658	687	651	745	680	732	677	552	561	596	548	521
