= Ferreiros =

Ferreiros may refer to:

- Ferreiros, Pernambuco, a city in Pernambuco, Brazil
- Ferreiros (Amares), a parish located in Amares, Portugal
- Ferreiros (Braga), a parish located in Braga, Portugal
- Ferreiros (Póvoa de Lanhoso), a parish located in Póvoa de Lanhoso, Portugal
