= Rosa Ramalho =

Portuguese sculptor (1888–1977)

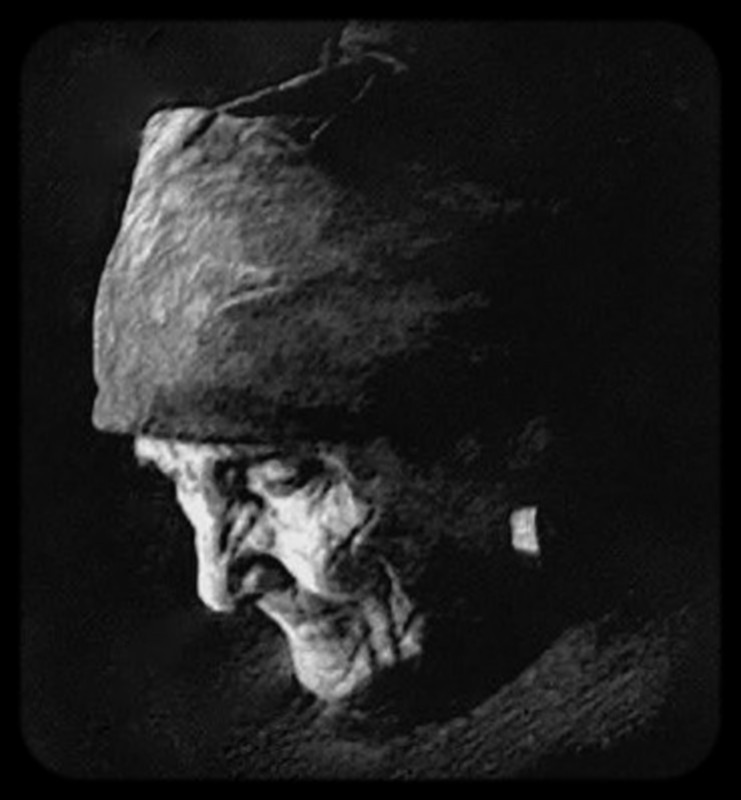
- Born: Rosa Barbosa Lopes; 14 August 1888; São Martinho de Galegos, Barcelos
- Died: December 1977 (aged 89); São Martinho de Galegos, Barcelos
- Known for: Sculpture
- Awards: Order of Saint James of the Sword

Rosa Ramalho DamSE (1888–1977) is the artist name of Portuguese ceramist Rosa Barbosa Lopes.

== Biography ==
Rosa Ramalho was born to a shoemaker and a weaver on 14 August 1888 in the parish of São Martinho de Galegos, in Barcelos, where she had learned to work with clay at a young age. When she married a miller at 18 and had seven children, however, she left pottery behind to raise her family. After her husband's death when she was aged 68, she returned to work with clay and began to create the figures that would establish her fame.

António Quadros (painter) aided in the discovery of Rosa Ramalho; she was the first to be known individually by name and had the acknowledgement, among other entities, of the Presidency, which made Rosa Ramalho a Dame in the Order of Saint James of the Sword. In 1968 she was also awarded the medal "As Artes ao Serviço da Nação" (Arts in Service to the Nation).

There is a book about Ramalho by Mário Cláudio (Rosa, 1988, included in Trilogia da mão) and a short film documentary by Nuno Paulo Bouça (À volta de Rosa Ramalho, 1996). A city street and a school in the parish of Barcelinhos also bear her name. There also exists the possibility of her old house in São Martinho de Galegos becoming a pottery museum.

Her work is continued today by her granddaughter Júlia Ramalho.
