= Águas Santas e Moure =

- Civil parish
- Interactive map of Águas Santas e Moure
- Country: Portugal
- Region: Norte
- Intermunic. comm.: Ave
- District: Braga
- Municipality: Póvoa de Lanhoso

Area
  - Total: 3.89 km^{2} (1.50 sq mi)

Population (2011)
  - Total: 662
  - Density: 170/km^{2} (441/sq mi)
- Time zone: UTC+00:00 (WET)
  - Summer (DST): UTC+01:00 (WEST)

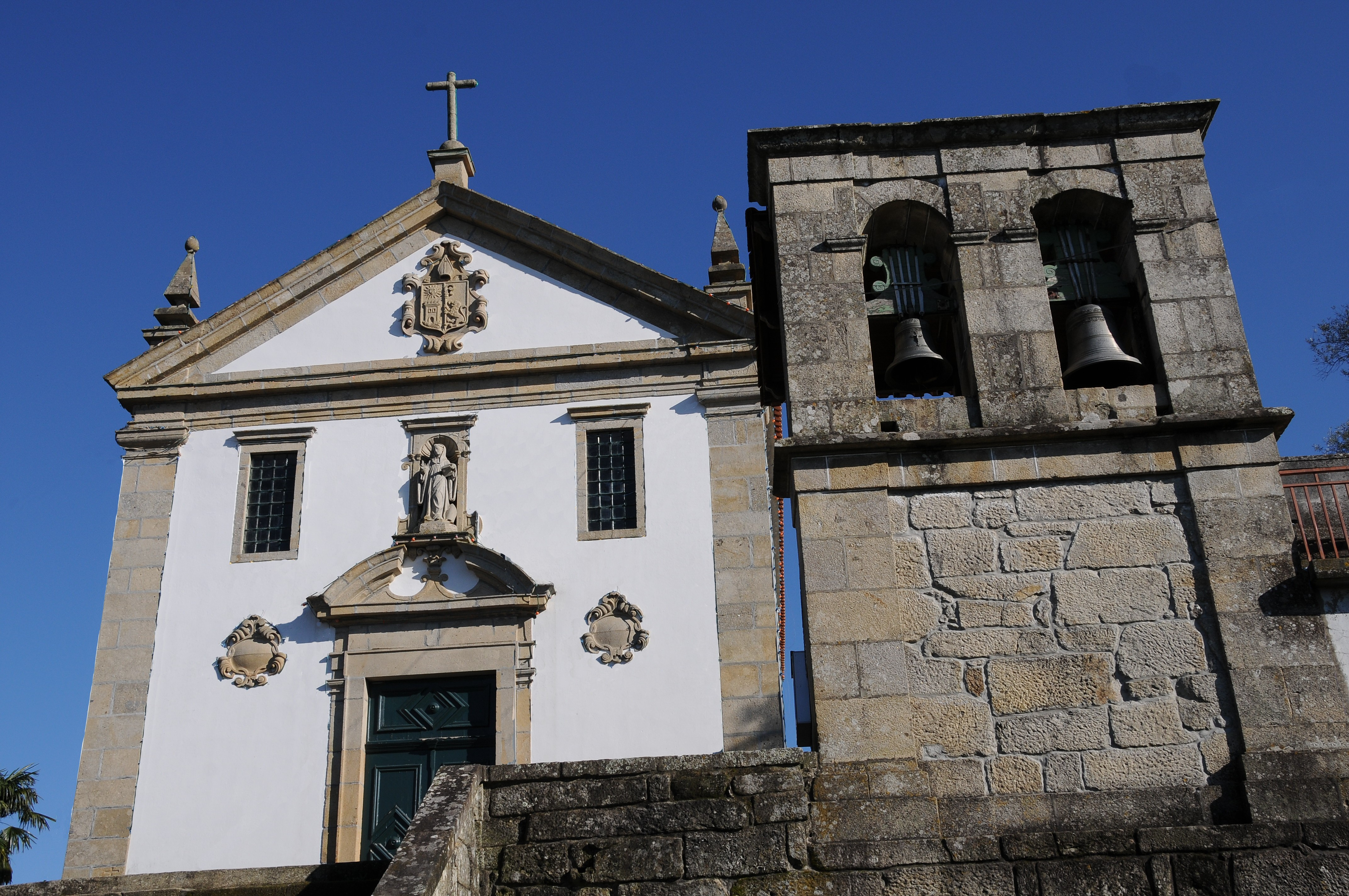

Águas Santas e Moure (officially, União das Freguesias de Águas Santas e Moure) is a Portuguese Freguesia in the Municipality of Póvoa de Lanhoso, it has an area of 3.89 km^{2} and 662 inahbitants (2011).

It was created during the administrative reorganization of 2012/2013, from the aggregation of the former parishes of Águas Santas and Moure.
