= Monsul =

- Civil parish
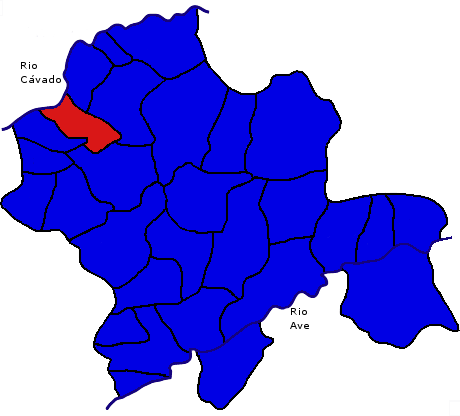
- Country: Portugal
- Region: Norte
- Intermunic. comm.: Ave
- District: Braga
- Municipality: Póvoa de Lanhoso

Area
  - Total: 3.39 km^{2} (1.31 sq mi)

Population (2011)
  - Total: 773
  - Density: 228/km^{2} (591/sq mi)
- Time zone: UTC+00:00 (WET)
  - Summer (DST): UTC+01:00 (WEST)

Monsul is a Portuguese Freguesia in the municipality of Póvoa de Lanhoso, it has an area of 3.39 km^{2} (1.31 sq mi) and 773 inhabitants (2011). Its population density is 228/km^{2} (590/sq mi).

== Population ==
Population of Monsul (1864 – 2011)
1864	1878	1890	1900	1911	1920	1930	1940	1950	1960	1970	1981	1991	2001	2011
727	700	673	719	782	762	748	783	881	856	688	747	789	806	773
