= Calvos e Frades =

- Civil parish
- Location in Portugal
- Coordinates: 41.594°N 8.264°W
- Country: Portugal
- Region: Norte
- Intermunic. comm.: Ave
- District: Braga
- Municipality: Póvoa de Lanhoso

Area
  - Total: 8.72 km^{2} (3.37 sq mi)

Population (2011)
  - Total: 753
  - Density: 86.4/km^{2} (224/sq mi)
- Time zone: UTC+00:00 (WET)
  - Summer (DST): UTC+01:00 (WEST)

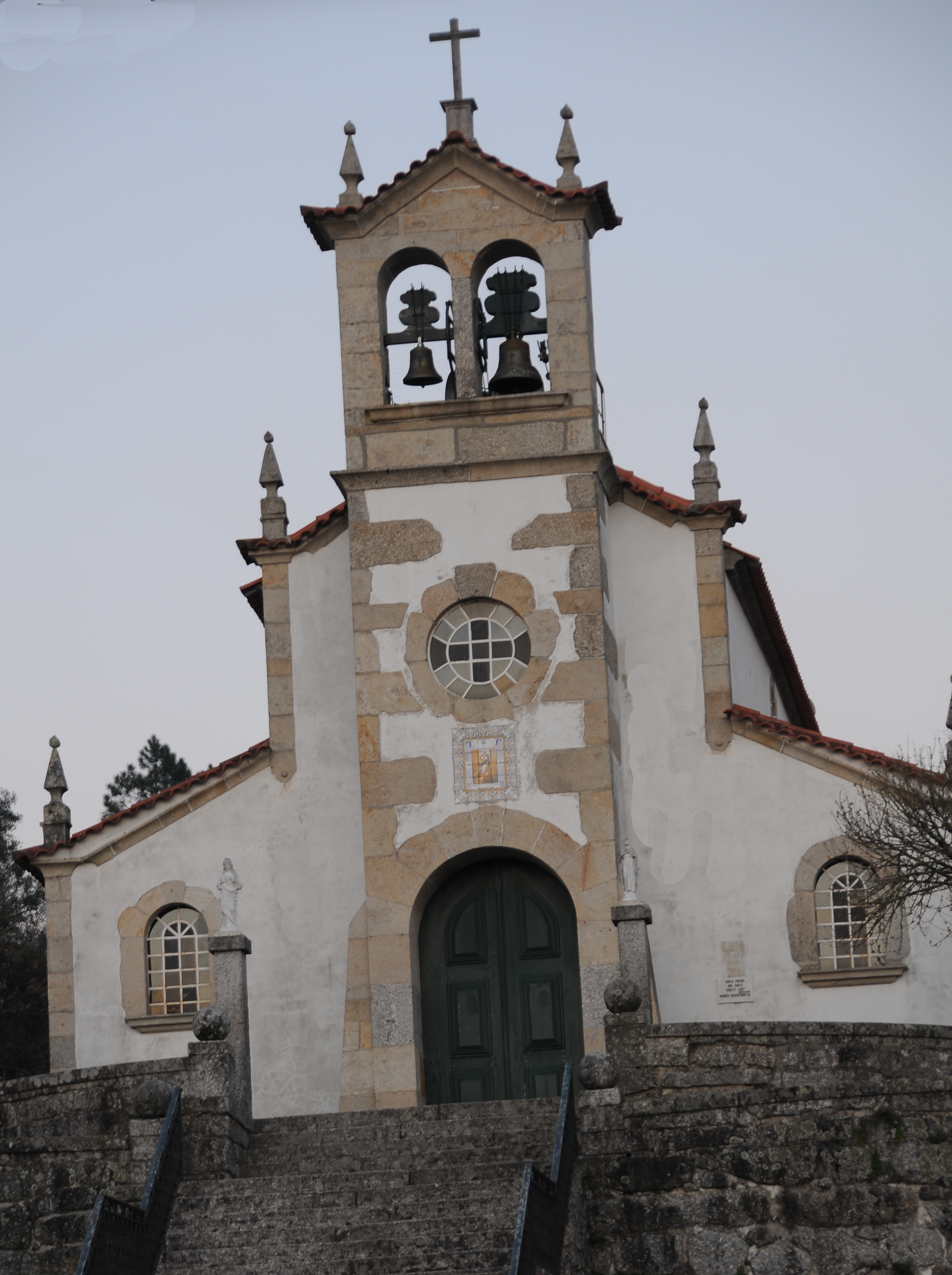
Calvos Church, in Calvos Povoa de Lanhoso, Portugal

Calvos e Frades is a freguesia ("civil parish") in the municipality of Póvoa de Lanhoso, northern Portugal. It was formed in 2013 by the merger of the former parishes of Calvos and Frades. The population in 2011 was 753, in an area of 8.72 km^{2}. The Calvos Oak is a protected five-century-old oak tree in Calvos.
