= Patuleia =

Civil war involving the peoples of Portugal in the 1830s

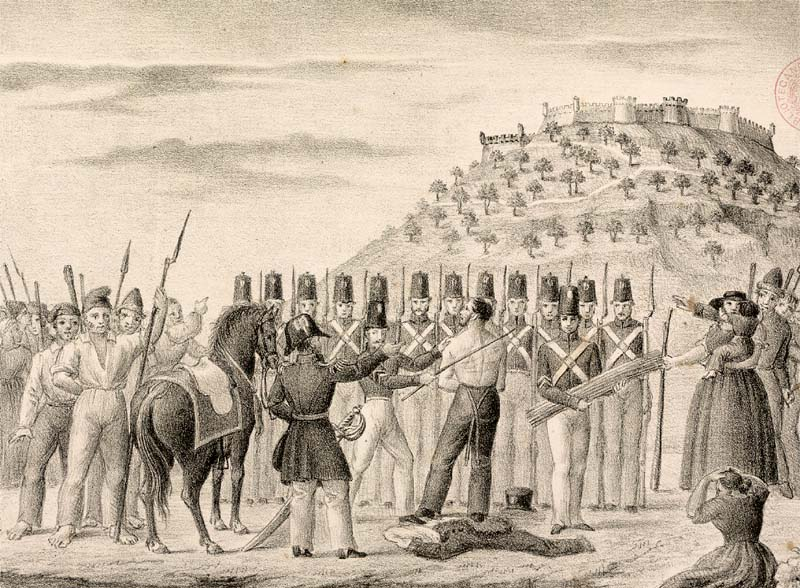
- Public flogging of a civilian by government troops during the Patuleia
Date	1846–1847 (8 months)
Location	Portugal
Result	Cartista victory: Signing of the Convention of Gramido

Belligerents
Cartistas; Maria II; 1834 Quadruple Alliance	Septembrists; Miguelists

Commanders and leaders
Duke of Saldanha	Count of Bonfim

The Patuleia, Guerra da Patuleia, or Little Civil War was a civil war in Portugal in 1846-47, so called to distinguish it from the 'great' civil war between Pedro IV and Miguel I (1828-1834). The Patuleia occurred after the Revolution of Maria da Fonte, and was closely associated with her. It was caused by the nomination, as a result of the palace coup of 6 October 1846, known as the "Emboscada", to set up a clearly Cartista government presided over by marshal João Oliveira e Daun, Duke of Saldanha.

The war lasted eight months, pitting the Cartistas (with the support of Queen Maria II) against an unnatural coalition of Septembrists and Miguelists. The focus of resistance to the new government was the Septembrist 'Junta of Porto', whose military leader, the First Count of Bonfim, was defeated by Marshal Saldanha at the siege of Torres Vedras on 22–23 December 1846, and sent into exile in Angola. Following the intervention of foreign military forces of the Quadruple Alliance, the war ended in a clear Cartista victory, resulting in the signing of the Convention of Gramido on 30 June 1847.

== Bibliography ==
- Bonifácio, Maria de Fátima (1993). História da guerra civil da patuleia, 1846-47. Editorial Estampa. ISBN 9789723309270.
