= Covelas (Póvoa de Lanhoso) =

- Civil parish
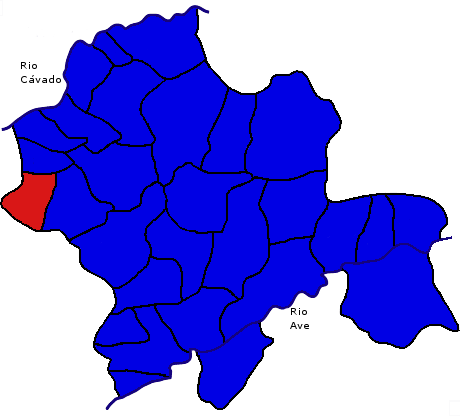
- Country: Portugal
- Region: Norte
- Intermunic. comm.: Ave
- District: Braga
- Municipality: Póvoa de Lanhoso

Area
  - Total: 2.84 km^{2} (1.10 sq mi)

Population (2011)
  - Total: 416
  - Density: 146/km^{2} (379/sq mi)
- Time zone: UTC+00:00 (WET)
  - Summer (DST): UTC+01:00 (WEST)

Covelas is a Portuguese Freguesia in the Municipality of Póvoa de Lanhoso, with an area of 2.84 km^{2} and 416 inhabitants (2011). It has a population density of 146.5 people per km^{2}.

== Population ==
Population of Covelas (1864 – 2011)

| Year | Pop. | ±% |
|---|---|---|
| 1864 | 254 | — |
| 1878 | 256 | +0.8% |
| 1890 | 234 | −8.6% |
| 1900 | 251 | +7.3% |
| 1911 | 291 | +15.9% |
| 1920 | 275 | −5.5% |
| 1930 | 321 | +16.7% |
| 1940 | 357 | +11.2% |

| Year | Pop. | ±% |
|---|---|---|
| 1950 | 287 | −19.6% |
| 1960 | 362 | +26.1% |
| 1970 | 323 | −10.8% |
| 1981 | 315 | −2.5% |
| 1991 | 366 | +16.2% |
| 2001 | 400 | +9.3% |
| 2011 | 416 | +4.0% |
