= Campos e Louredo =

Coordinates: 41°32′44″N 8°16′56″W

- Civil parish
- Interactive map of Campos e Louredo
- Country: Portugal
- Region: Norte
- Intermunic. comm.: Ave
- District: Braga
- Municipality: Póvoa de Lanhoso

Area
  - Total: 5.78 km^{2} (2.23 sq mi)

Population (2011)
  - Total: 1,485
  - Density: 257/km^{2} (665/sq mi)
- Time zone: UTC+00:00 (WET)
  - Summer (DST): UTC+01:00 (WEST)

Campos e Louredo (officially: União das Freguesias de Campos e Louredo) is a freguesia in the municipality of Póvoa de Lanhoso, Portugal. It has an area of 5.87 km² and 1,485 inhabitants (2011).

It was created during the administrative reorganization of 2012/2013, from the previous parishes Campos and Louredo.
