= Emboscada (historical event) =

1846 Portuguese coup

The Emboscada (Portuguese - Ambush) was a palace coup of 6 October 1846, by which queen Maria II deposed the government presided over by Pedro de Sousa Holstein, 1st Duke of Palmela, that had been installed on 20 May that year as a result of the Revolution of Maria da Fonte. By thus dismissing the government of Palmela, that had only come to power five months earlier, and replacing it with a Cartista government (described as government of the Cabrais without Cabral) presided over by João Francisco de Saldanha Oliveira e Daun, 1st Duke of Saldanha, the monarch rekindled the revolt and precipitated the civil war known as the Patuleia.
