= Travassos (parish) =

- Civil parish
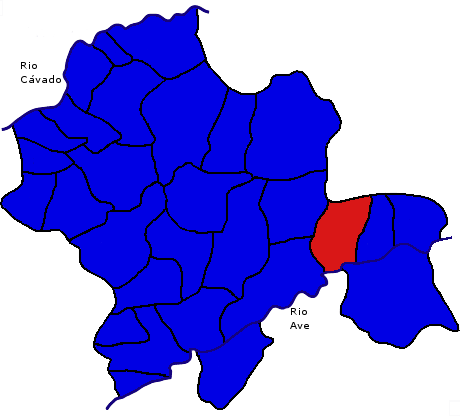
- Country: Portugal
- Region: Norte
- Intermunic. comm.: Ave
- District: Braga
- Municipality: Póvoa de Lanhoso

Area
  - Total: 3.59 km^{2} (1.39 sq mi)

Population (2011)
  - Total: 696
  - Density: 194/km^{2} (502/sq mi)
- Time zone: UTC+00:00 (WET)
  - Summer (DST): UTC+01:00 (WEST)

Travassos is a Portuguesa Freguesia in the municipality of Póvoa de Lanhoso, it has an area of 3.59 km² and 696 inhabitants (2011), 140 people per square kilometer.

== Population ==
Population of Travassos

Year	Pop.	±%
1864	723	—
1878	688	−4.8%
1890	585	−15.0%
1900	687	+17.4%
1911	806	+17.3%
1920	791	−1.9%
1930	716	−9.5%
1940	789	+10.2%

Year	Pop.	±%
1950	863	+9.4%
1960	950	+10.1%
1970	866	−8.8%
1981	929	+7.3%
1991	749	−19.4%
2001	777	+3.7%
2011	696	−10.4%
