= Verim, Friande e Ajude =

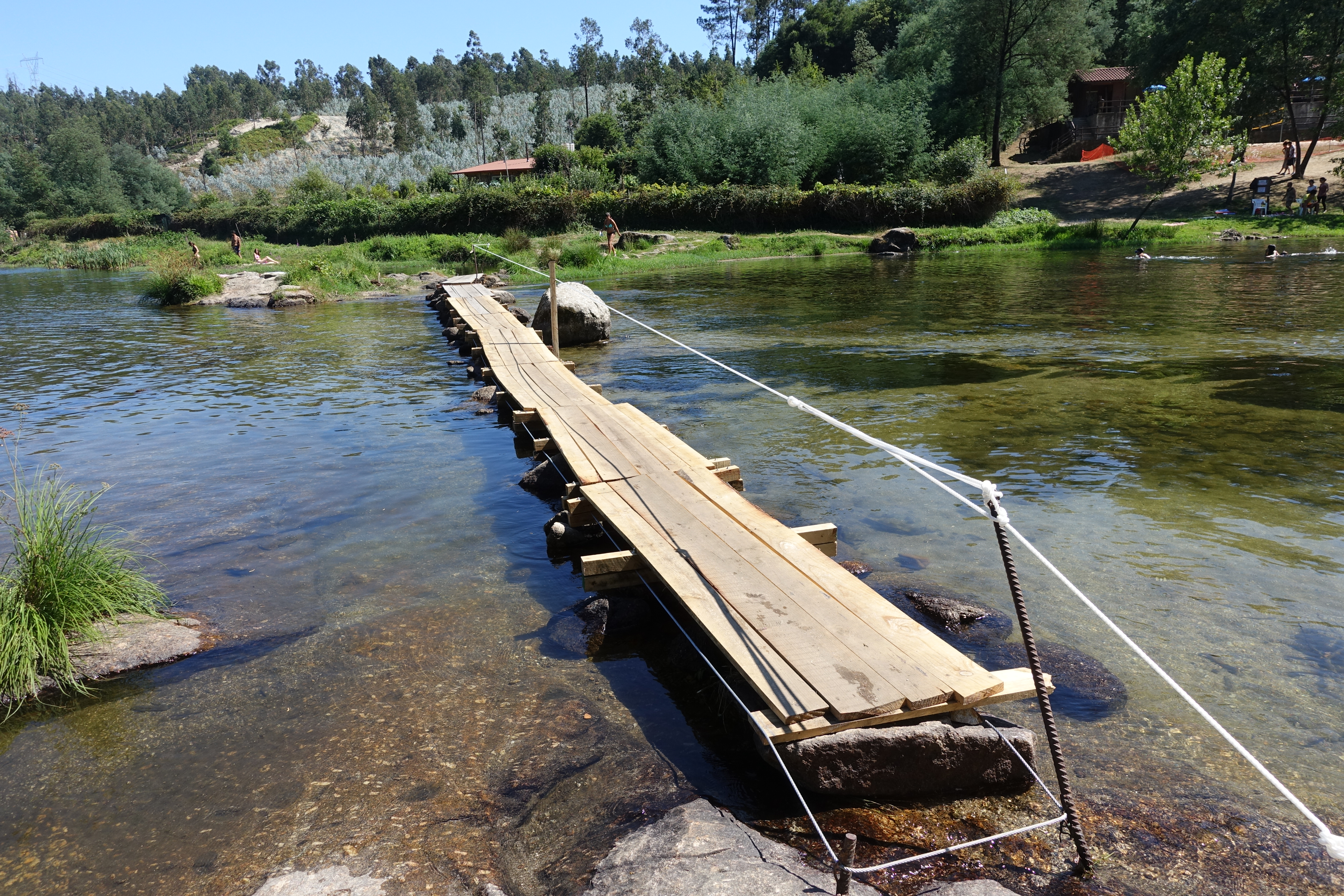
River beach and bridge in Verim

Verim, Friande e Ajuda (officially, União das Freguesias de Verim, Friande e Ajuda) is a Portuguese Parish in the Municipality of Póvoa de Lanhoso, with an area of 9.4 km² and 733 inhabitants (2011).

It was created during the administrative reorganization of 2012/2013, resulting from the aggregation of the former parishes of Verim, Friande, and Ajuda.
