= Church of Fontarcada =

Church in Braga, Portugal

Coordinates: 41°34′45″N 8°14′44″W

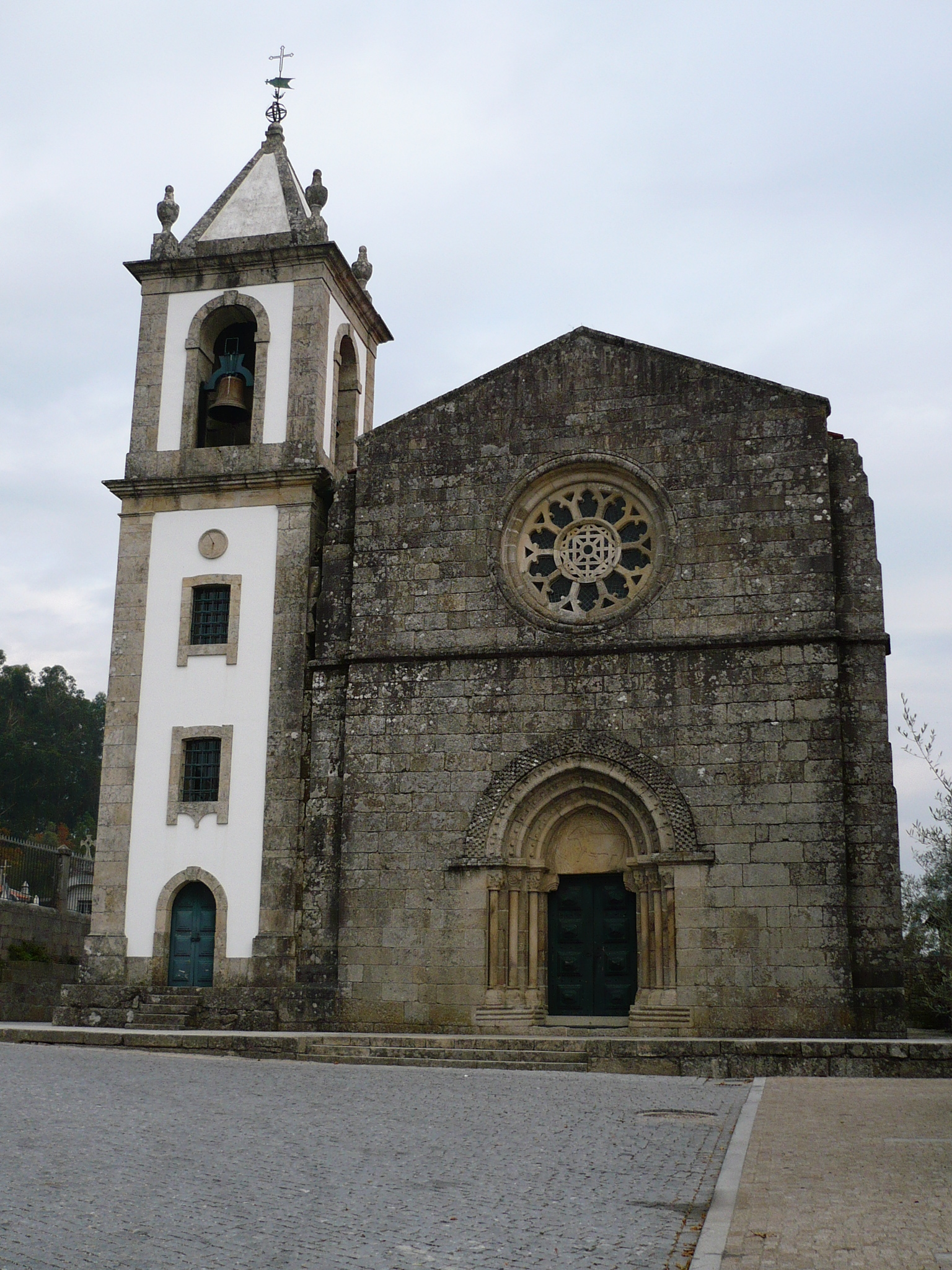
Facade

The Church of Fontarcada or Matriz de Fontarcada (Portuguese: Igreja Matriz de Fontarcada) was a Romanesque monastic church to a Benedictine monastery founded in 1067, now the parish church of Fontarcada. It was classified as a National Monument by decree on 16 June 1910. It is dedicated to Saint Saviour.

== History ==
The monastery was founded by a donation of D. Godinho Fafes (or Falifaz), father of the rich count D. Henrique, responsible for building the hunting-lodge of Fontarcada, in whose yard the church was built, possibly at the start of the 12th century. Today nothing remains of the monastery buildings, the monastery having been extinguished in the 14th or 15th centuries.

The present church dates to the end of the 13th century and the early 14th century, when the Benedictine monks were entering into disputes as to the rights of the neighbouring aristocrats and landlords. In 1450 king Afonso V of Portugal confirmed the monastery's privileges, five years before the archbishop of Braga Fernando da Guerra decided to convert it into an archdeaconry. The church was restored in the 16th century. It is classified as a National Monument by Decree of June 16, 1910.

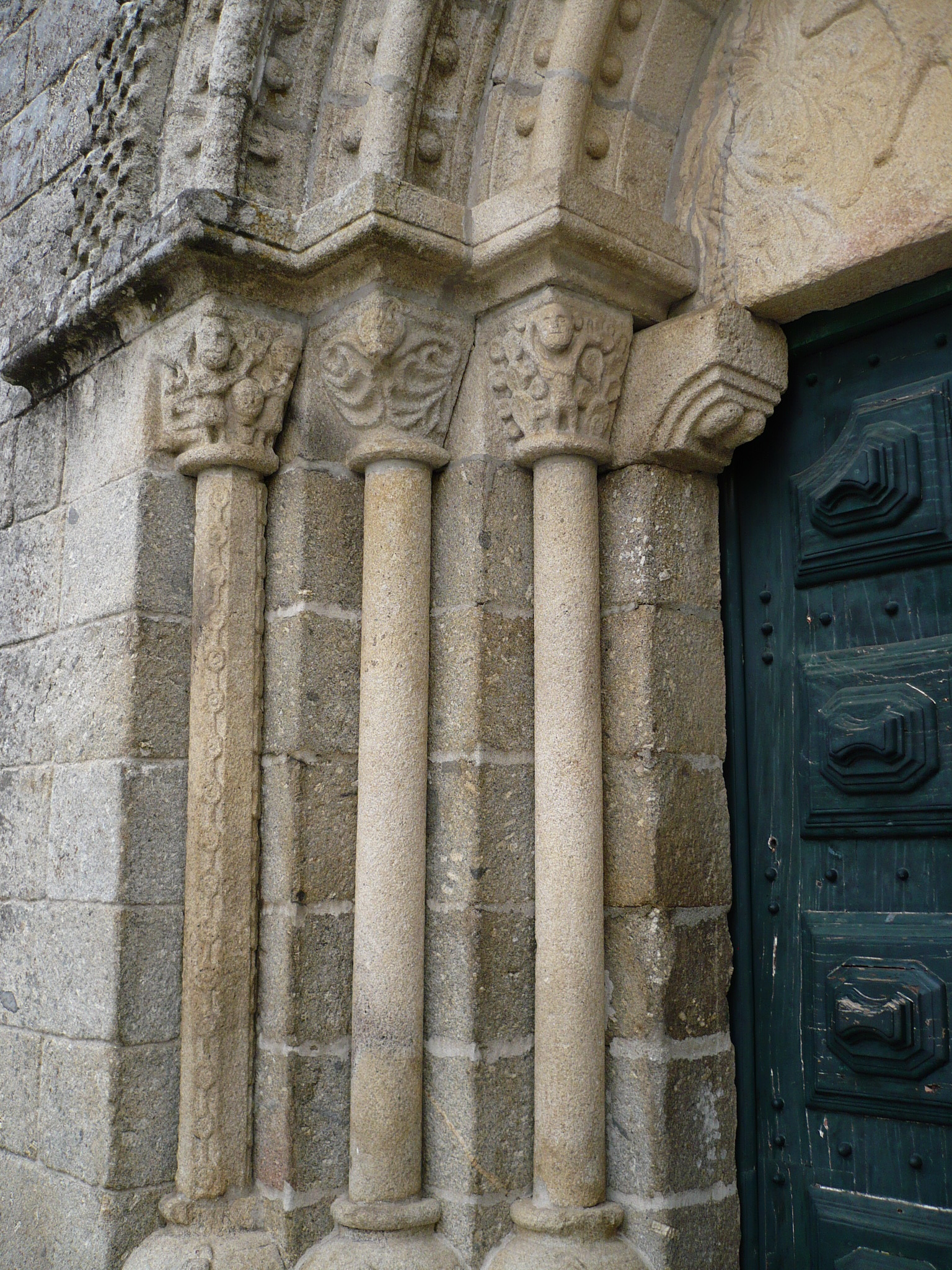
Columns of the main door.

== Design ==
The main facade is austere and has a main door with three archivolts supported by six columns with worked capitals and surmounted by a frieze and a tympanum of the Agnus Dei. Above the door is a rose window with two rings in the same style as the door, thus probably by the same master of works.

The external apse of the church is surrounded by three columns with carved capitals, below a cornice of Lombard arcades. The whole apse is ornamented with an entablature with half-circles. The eaves of the side walls of the nave are also covered with a cornice. On the south side is a side door with a broken arch, with two archivolts supported by two columns, topped by capitals sculpted with vegetal motifs and a tympanum with a cross pattée with a sun and moon to either side. The bell tower is on the north side of the nave and has an open bell-chamber at the top and a pyramidal roof.

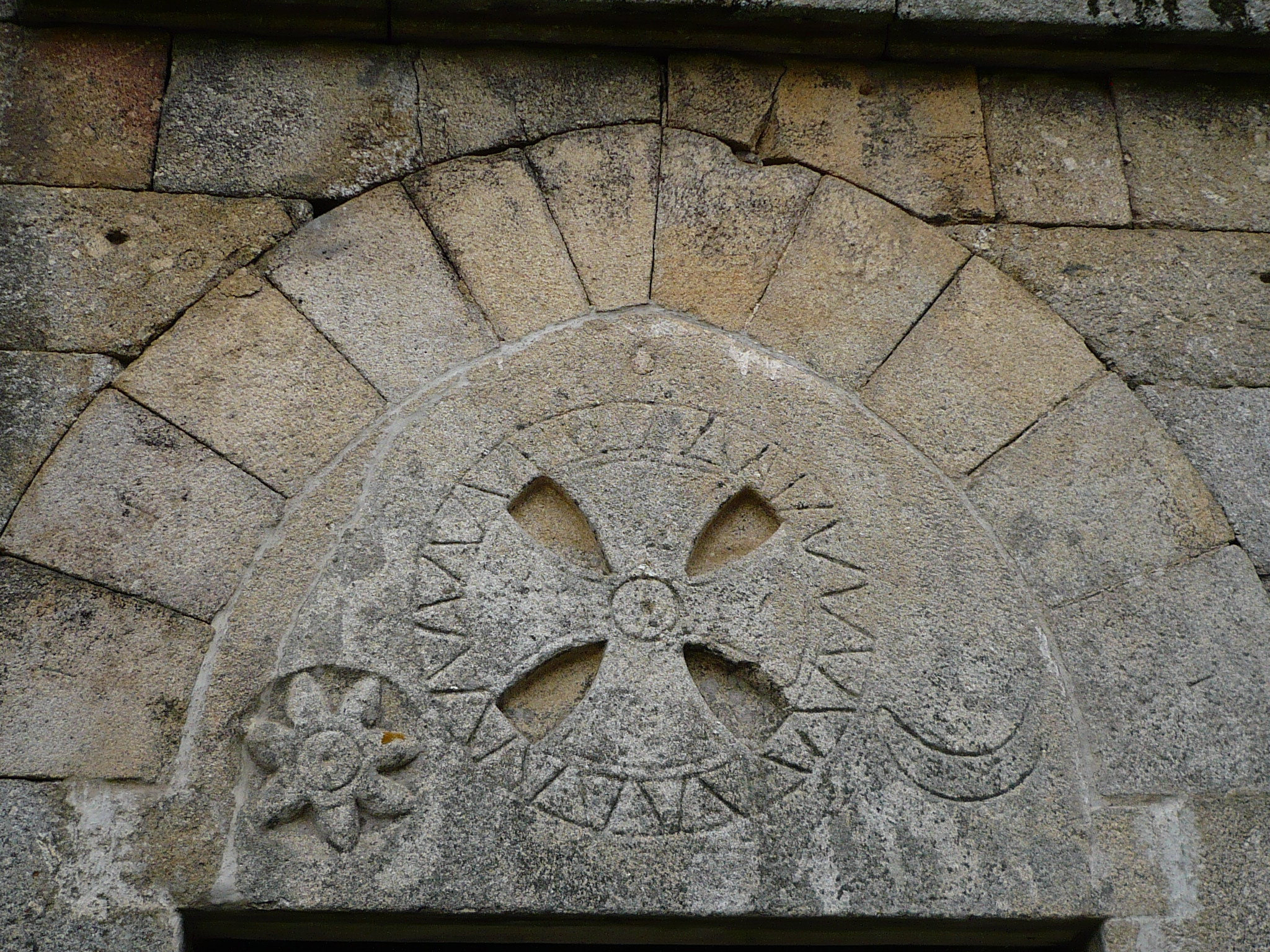
Tympanum of the south side-door

The church is covered inside by a wooden roof over an aisleless nave. The east end is semicircular, with its walls divided in two by a horizontal frieze. The lower of the two is a presbytery richly decorated with five pre-Romanesque blind arcades supported by vegetal columns (with traces of medieval frescoes), while the upper one are decorations like doors, with archivolts on sober columns with worked capitals.
