= Serzedelo (Póvoa de Lanhoso) =

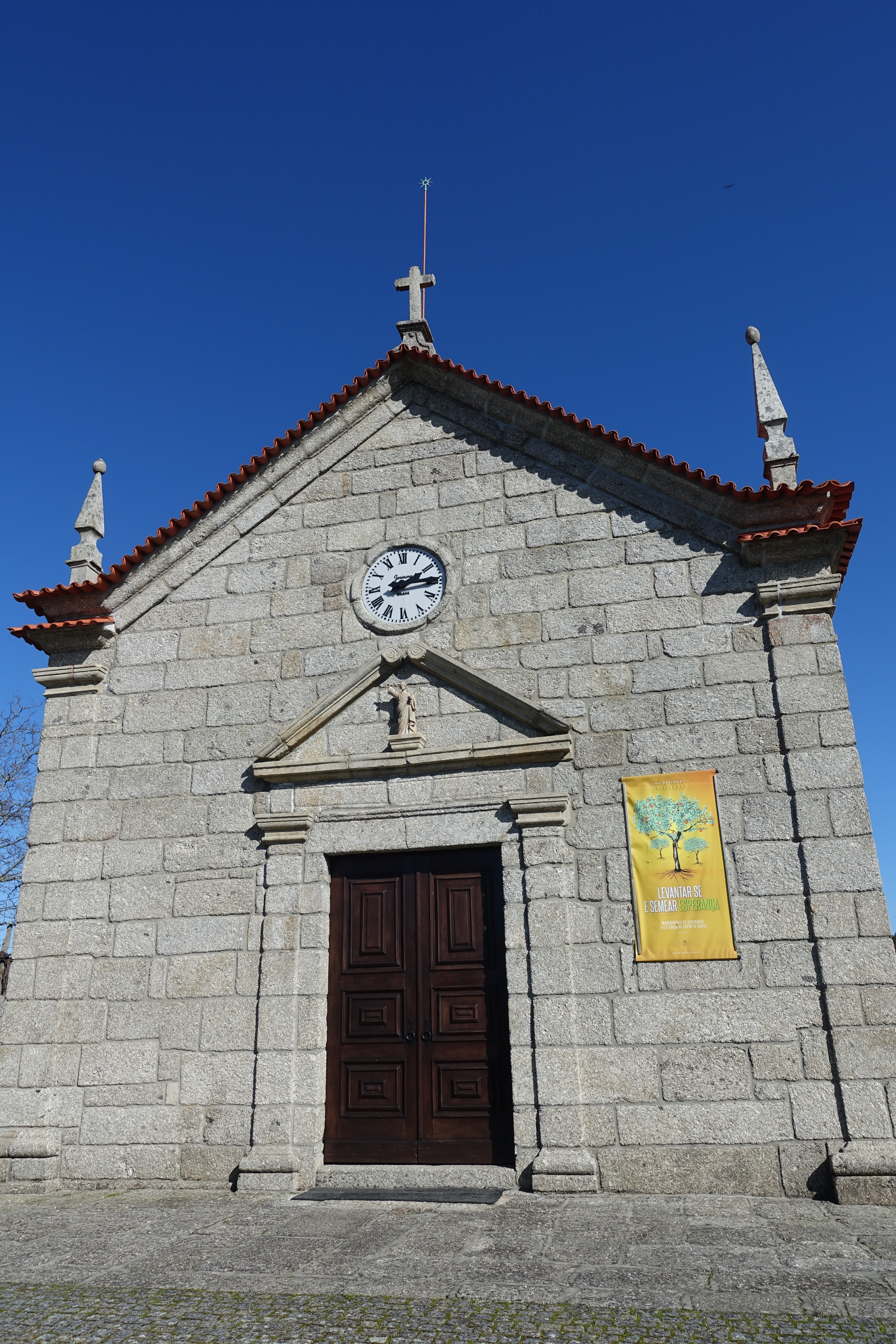
Church of Serzedelo in Póvoa de Lanhoso Portugal.

Serzedelo is a Portuguses Freguesia in the Municipality of Póvoa de Lanhoso, with an area of 10.75 km^{2} and 723 inhabitants (2011).

== Population ==
Population of Serzedelo

| Year | Pop. | ±% |
|---|---|---|
| 1864 | 959 | — |
| 1878 | 1,009 | +5.2% |
| 1890 | 875 | −13.3% |
| 1900 | 900 | +2.9% |
| 1911 | 967 | +7.4% |
| 1920 | 989 | +2.3% |
| 1930 | 1,021 | +3.2% |
| 1940 | 1,012 | −0.9% |

| Year | Pop. | ±% |
|---|---|---|
| 1950 | 1,129 | +11.6% |
| 1960 | 974 | −13.7% |
| 1970 | 968 | −0.6% |
| 1981 | 962 | −0.6% |
| 1991 | 783 | −18.6% |
| 2001 | 830 | +6.0% |
| 2011 | 723 | −12.9% |
