= Garfe =

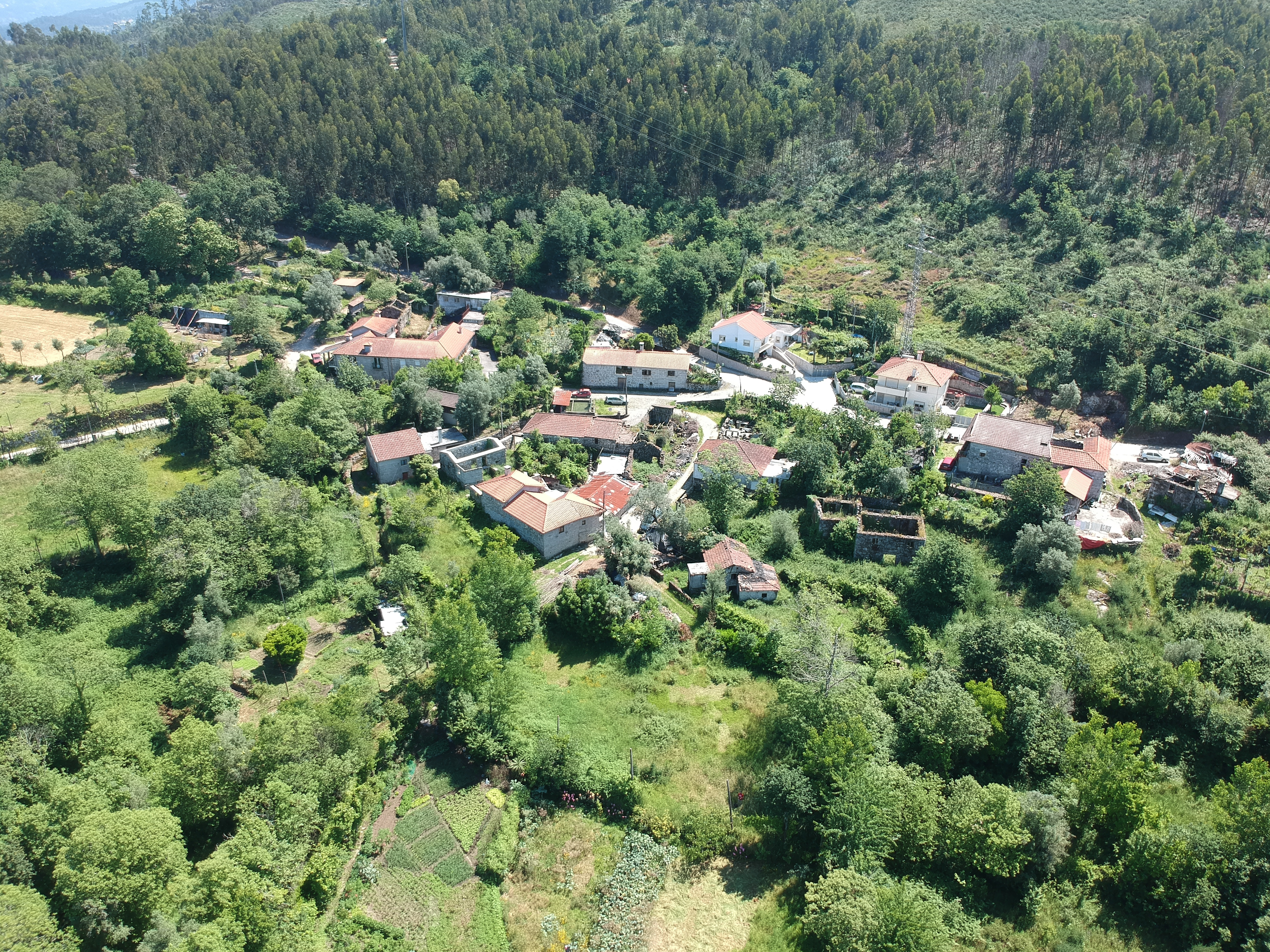

Garfe is a Portuguese freguesia (parish) in the municipality of Póvoa de Lanhoso with an area of 4.68 km^{2} and 1,000 inhabitants (2011).

== Ancient shrine ==
The parish is the location of a rock shrine associated with ancient indigenous deities. On March 30, 2020, the shrine was classified as a Site of Public Interest due to its religious importance and aesthetic value.
