= Convention of Gramido =

1847 peace treaty

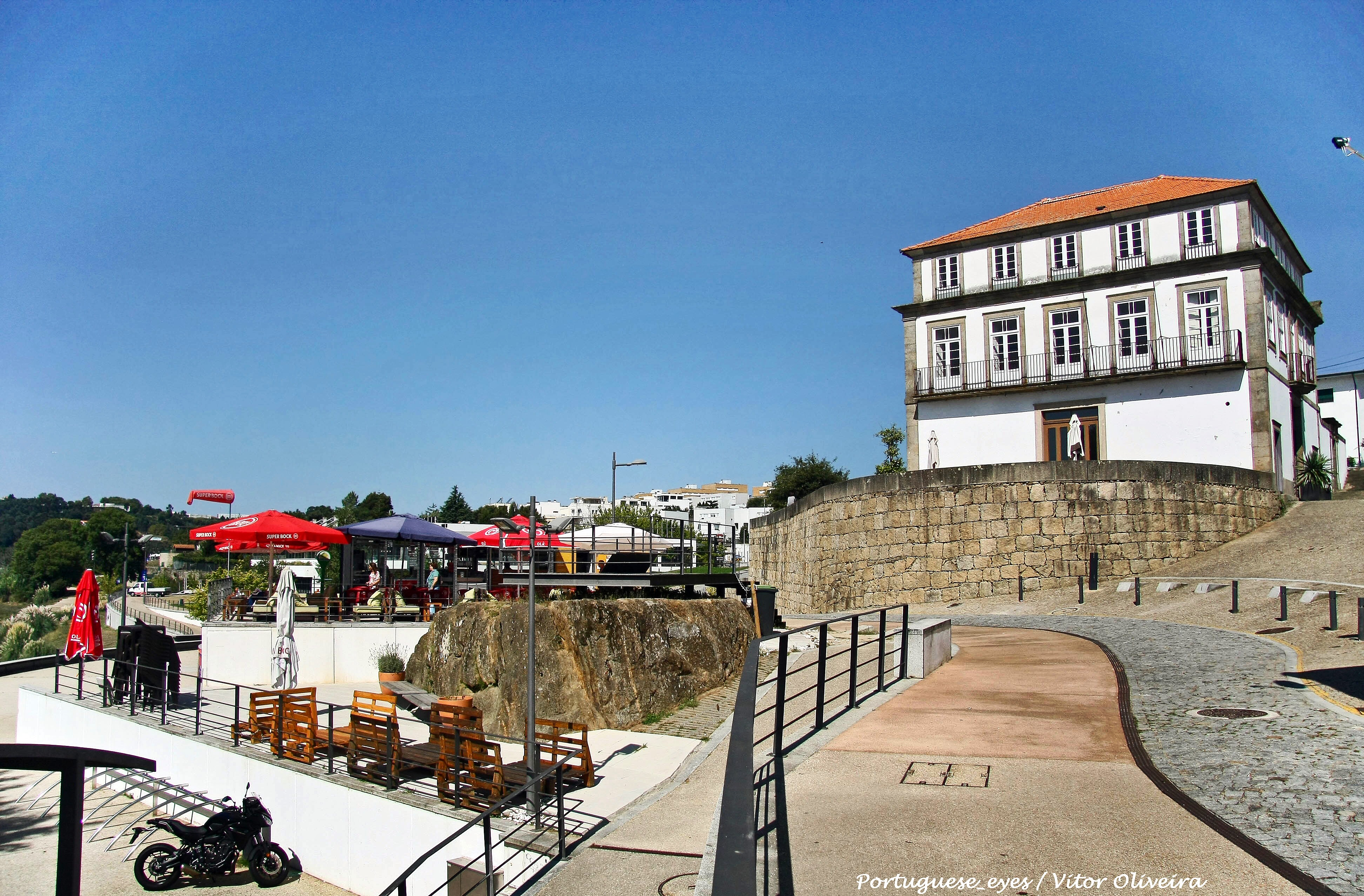
The Casa Branca in Gramido where the convention was signed

The Convention of Gramido was an agreement signed on 29 June 1847, in the Casa Branca (White House) of Gramido, in Valbom, Portugal. It marked the conclusion of the Patuleia, a civil war between the Septembrists and the Cartistas. The Convention was signed by the commanders of the Spanish and British forces acting under the Quadruple Alliance, the representative of the Portuguese government in Lisbon, and representatives from the Junta in Porto. The agreement ended the conflict on terms that, while conciliatory in tone, solidified the Cartistas' victory and strengthened the position of Queen Maria II's government.

== The agreement ==
The Convention was signed by representatives from the warring parties and allied powers. Lieutenant General Manuel de la Concha and Colonel Buenaga represented Spain, while Colonel Wilde acted on behalf of the United Kingdom. The Portuguese government was represented by the Marquis of Loulé and the Junta of Porto by General César de Vasconcelos.

The agreement established several provisions to ensure peace and stability. The cities of Porto and Vila Nova de Gaia were to be temporarily occupied by Spanish troops to ensure stability, with British forces stationed at strategic points such as the Fort São João Baptista da Foz and allied warships stationed in the Douro River. The allied powers guaranteed the safety and property of Porto's residents and promised honorable treatment for the defeated Junta’s officers, allowing them to retain their personal weapons and horses. Soldiers were permitted to return to their hometowns without reprisals, and freedom of movement was granted to those wishing to leave or return to Portugal. Captured weapons were surrendered peacefully, and the Allies committed to advocating for improved conditions for former Royalist army officers.

== Consequences ==
The Convention ended the civil war and restored order in northern Portugal. Despite its conciliatory tone, resentment persisted among Queen Maria II and her supporters toward the defeated Septembrists. This resentment led to punitive actions against the opposition, fostering political instability that contributed to the outbreak of the Regeneration (Regeneração) in 1851.

== Casa Branca ==
The Casa Branca of Gramido, where the Convention was signed was acquired by the municipality of Gondomar in 1989 and restored in the 1990s. In 2014, it served as an interactive tourism office with exhibitions and in 2023, it became the home of the Municipal Filigree Museum (Museu Municipal da Filigrana), showcasing the region's filigree tradition.
