= Esperança e Brunhais =

Coordinates: 41°35′04″N 8°10′28″W

- Civil parish
- Interactive map of Esperança e Brunhais
- Country: Portugal
- Region: Norte
- Intermunic. comm.: Ave
- District: Braga
- Municipality: Póvoa de Lanhoso

Area
  - Total: 7.12 km^{2} (2.75 sq mi)

Population (2011)
  - Total: 652
  - Density: 91.6/km^{2} (237/sq mi)
- Time zone: UTC+00:00 (WET)
  - Summer (DST): UTC+01:00 (WEST)

Esperança e Brunhais (officially, União das Freguesias de Esperança e Brunhais) is a Portuguese freguesia in the Municipality of Póvoa de Lanhoso, it has an area of 7.12 km^{2} and 652 inhabitants as of 2011. It was created during the administrative reorganization of 2012/2013, from the aggregation of the former parishes of Esperança and Brunhais.
