= Ferreiros (Póvoa de Lanhoso) =

- Civil parish
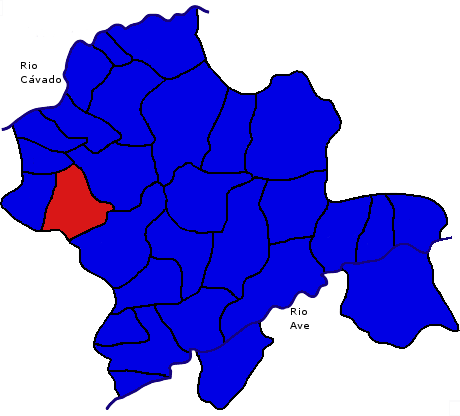
- Country: Portugal
- Region: Norte
- Intermunic. comm.: Ave
- District: Braga
- Municipality: Póvoa de Lanhoso

Area
  - Total: 4.88 km^{2} (1.88 sq mi)

Population (2011)
  - Total: 416
  - Density: 85/km^{2} (220/sq mi)
- Time zone: UTC+00:00 (WET)
  - Summer (DST): UTC+01:00 (WEST)

Ferreiros is a Portuguesae Freguesia in the Municipality of Póvoa de Lanhoso, with and area of 4.88 km² and 416 inhabitants as of 2011. The population density is 85.2 people per km².

== Population ==
Population of Ferreiros (1864 – 2011)
1864	1878	1890	1900	1911	1920	1930	1940	1950	1960	1970	1981	1991	2001	2011
400	327	341	385	376	404	475	433	464	465	394	387	396	439	416
