= Galegos (Póvoa de Lanhoso) =

- Civil parish
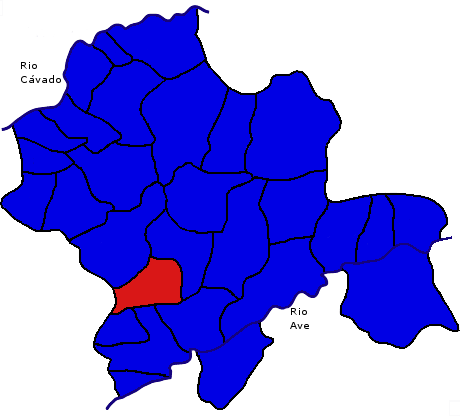
- Country: Portugal
- Region: Norte
- Intermunic. comm.: Ave
- District: Braga
- Municipality: Póvoa de Lanhoso

Area
  - Total: 2.50 km^{2} (0.97 sq mi)

Population (2011)
  - Total: 543
  - Density: 217/km^{2} (563/sq mi)
- Time zone: UTC+00:00 (WET)
  - Summer (DST): UTC+01:00 (WEST)

Galegos is a Portuguese Freguesia in the Municipality of Póvoa de Lanhoso, with an area of 2.50 km² and 543 inhabitants (2011).

== Population ==
Population of Galegos (1864 – 2011)
1864	1878	1890	1900	1911	1920	1930	1940	1950	1960	1970	1981	1991	2001	2011
255	311	331	317	351	346	347	439	471	463	476	604	545	629	543
