= Diogo Gonçalves de Travassos =

Portuguese nobleman

- Escrivão da puridade
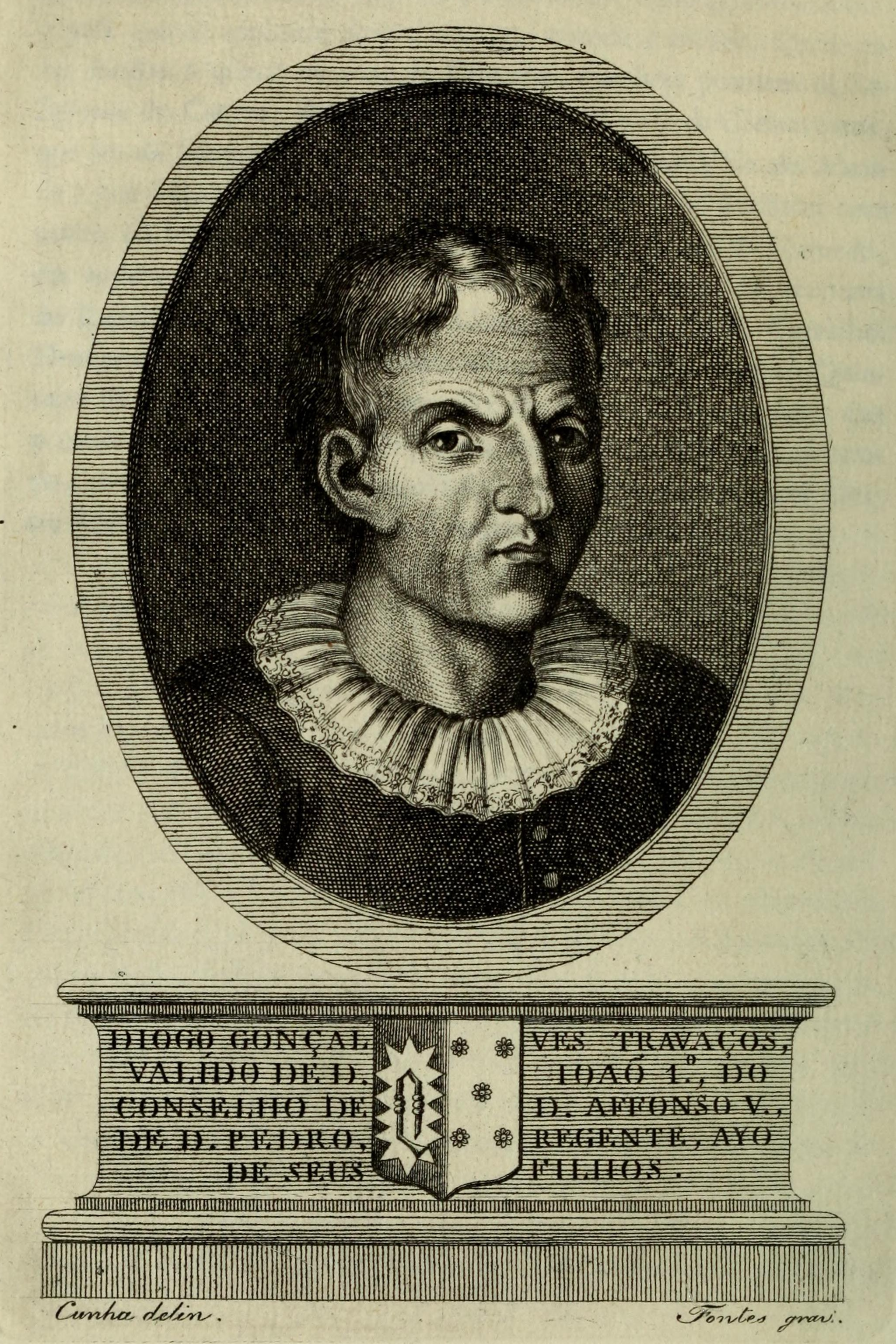
- Diogo Gonçalves de Travassos
- Born: 1390s Portugal
- Died: May 20, 1449 (aged 58–59); Batalha, Portugal
- Buried: Mosteiro da Batalha
- Spouse: Violante Velho Cabral

Diogo Gonçalves de Travassos (1390s–1449) was a Portuguese nobleman, who served as escrivão da puridade (King's private secretary) of Peter, Duke of Coimbra.

He was the son of Martim Gonçalves de Travassos and Catarina Dias de Melo. He was married to Violante Velho Cabral, daughter of Fernão Velho and Maria Alvares Cabral, belonging to a noble Portuguese family. She was the sister of Gonçalo Velho Cabral, and descendant of Pedro Soares Velho.

Diogo Gonçalves de Travassos participated actively in the conquest of Ceuta. He was a faithful vassal of the Infante Peter, being also godfather of two of his children. He died on 20 May 1449 during the Battle of Alfarrobeira, being buried in Batalha Monastery, in the chapel door of king.
