= 1834 Quadruple Alliance =

British-French-Spanish-Portuguese agreement

The Quadruple Alliance, or Quadruple Entente, was a treaty signed between the United Kingdom of Great Britain and Ireland, Kingdom of France, Spain and Kingdom of Portugal on 22 April 1834, by which the four States undertook to expel from Portugal the Portuguese Infante Miguel and the Spanish Infante Carlos. With the beginning of the Carlist War, additional articles were signed in August of that year, by which the rest of the signatory parties undertook to help the legitimist government in Spain. The treaty was understood by the Austrian Empire, Russian Empire and Kingdom of Prussia, absolutist powers, as a joint diplomatic action in international politics to defend the liberal models represented by the governments of the Quadruple Alliance.

In the practical field, given that France and the United Kingdom were the first European powers, it was a question of both securing partial control of Spain and Portugal as medium-sized countries with unstable policies, such as the government of Isabella II in Spain, in a manner closer to a protectorate. This put an end to Spain's membership of the Holy Alliance, already quite denaturalized, and it was a significant milestone that two countries traditionally at loggerheads, such as France and the United Kingdom, reached a mutual understanding.

The Quadruple Alliance guaranteed the support of France and the United Kingdom for the dynastic pretensions of the daughter of Ferdinand VII of Spain, Isabella II, against the pretender to the Crown, Carlos María Isidro de Borbón, a fact that was significant for the defeat of the latter's supporters in the First Carlist War and for the consolidation of the regime.

== Context ==
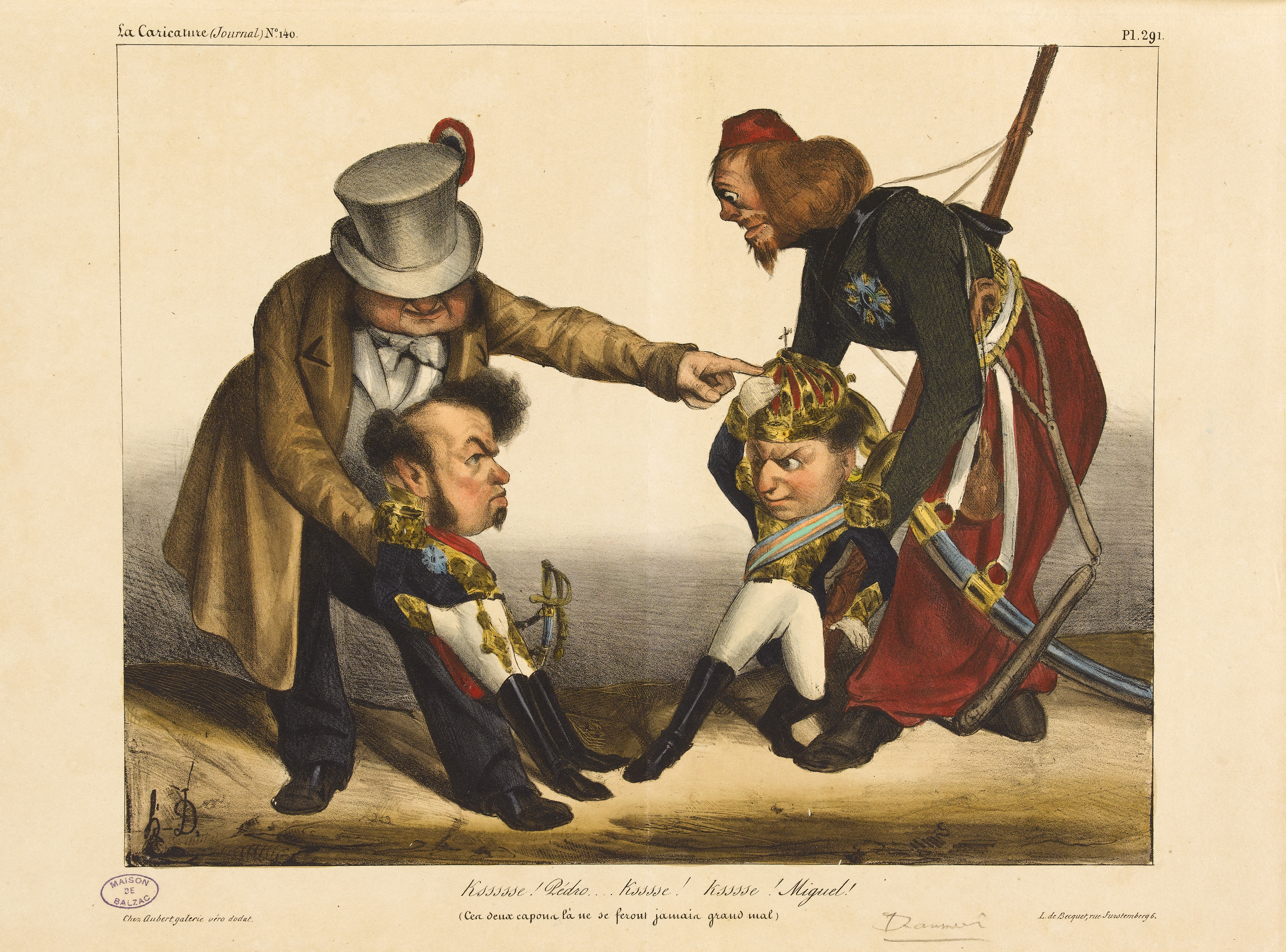
Caricature of Pedro IV and Miguel I of Portugal disputing the crown. The development of the Portuguese Civil War would be one of the main reasons for signing the Treaty of the Quadruple.

The Revolutions of 1830 marked a turning point in the system of the European concert initiated at the Congress of Vienna in 1815. As Menchén Barrios states, "the political ambitions that lead to it [the Quadruple Alliance] depend on the existing antagonisms between the liberal Europe that emerges from the revolution and the absolutist Europe". The Belgian Revolution was the first example of the division into blocs, the United Kingdom and France on the one hand, Prussia, Austria and Russia on the other.

The rapprochement between the United Kingdom and France was brought about by "multiple interests, and not only by ideological affinities", although these were evident. In France, the revolution of 1830 gave power to Louis-Philippe, who at first adopted liberal positions. In the United Kingdom, the Whigs took over the government and imposed the Great Reform Act in 1832, which allowed for a certain political openness and a broadening of the basis of the parliamentary regime. An important point of the Whig approaches, and especially of the radicals who supported them in Parliament, was the defense of liberal ideals in Europe. This defense and union explained the rapprochement with France, which took the form of a common front against the absolutist monarchies. In any case, this collaboration had two important limitations: the traditional English principle of non-intervention and the different and conflicting economic interests of each country.

As for Spain and Portugal, both countries had a very difficult internal situation. In Portugal, a civil war had been going on since the 1828. In Spain the situation was also similar, although war would not break out until after the signing of the treaty. In international politics the treaty, and the dependence it entailed, was "the result of the international isolation of the Isabelline regime". López-Cordón emphasized this isolation, adding that it stemmed from the "disqualification of Spain as a European power, the result of the unfortunate foreign policy of Fernando VII". An example of Spain's isolation in international politics is that only France and England recognized Isabella II as the legitimate heir at first. Her example was only followed by countries dependent on those powers.

== Meaning ==
The immediate purpose of the treaty was to achieve the expulsion of the Infantes Miguel and Carlos from Portugal, but it was understood that the commitments assumed went beyond this. Without the need to explicitly state this in the treaty, England continued to maintain its influence in Portugal and unilateral Spanish action was avoided. Furthermore, the union of the constitutionalist countries (what would be called the "spirit" of the Quadruple) made the Northern Powers uneasy. Javier de Burgos defined the treaty as "a kind of provocation directed at the Northern Powers" (Prussia, Austria and Russia).

The negotiation of the additional articles was complicated, as it involved transforming moral support into effective support on the ground. The new articles concerned the United Kingdom, but above all France, which made specific commitments without much intention of fulfilling them quickly.

The most obvious meaning for the historiography on the Quadruple Alliance is that this treaty entailed a "tutelage" of the United Kingdom and France over Spain and Portugal, something that was already reflected in the very text of the treaty. The tutelage was due to the unequal weight of the signatories due to their situation and circumstances. Authors such as Vilar have come to consider that "in practice it is a treaty of Anglo-French protectorate over the two states of the Iberian Peninsula".

== Contracting parties ==
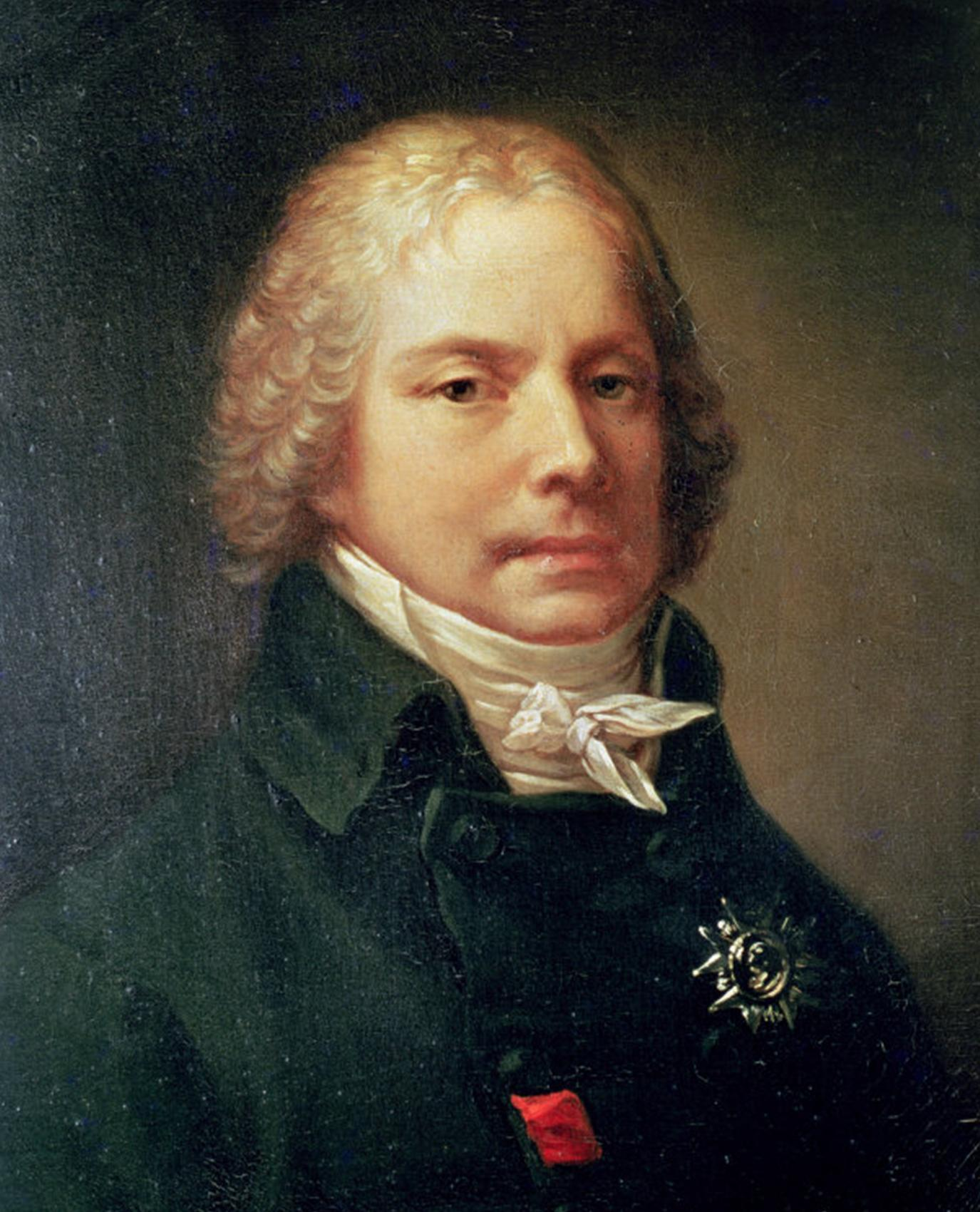
Talleyrand, the French ambassador in London, succeeded in getting France included in the treaty despite British reluctance.

The initiative for the treaty came from the United Kingdom. Portugal, despite considering military support as essential, joined the treaty with little enthusiasm, seeing it as necessary and inevitable. Vilar believes that even Portugal joined the treaty "in a somewhat forced way". Spain, on the other hand, signed as enthusiastic, since it was seen as a diplomatic success, as the "crowning of the process of rapprochement with the United Kingdom".

Moreover, the accession of France was at first viewed with reluctance by Palmerston, the British Foreign Secretary who signed the treaty, and was only achieved under pressure from Talleyrand, the French ambassador in London. The final inclusion gives a secondary role to France, dependent on the rest of the parties; it was rather a moral effect to "dispel the rumors spread by the absolutist powers about Franco-British differences". For France it was a way to achieve an "institutional compromise that would support the Entente". Therefore, rather than out of interest in the Portuguese and Spanish problems, France's inclusion is understood by its desire for rapprochement with Britain.

== Consequences ==
Two stages can be distinguished in the practical existence of the Quadruple Alliance. The first would be the immediate implementation of the commitments undertaken and the second would refer to the "spirit of the Quadruple", once the reasons that justified the treaty had been concluded.

=== Portuguese and Spanish civil wars ===
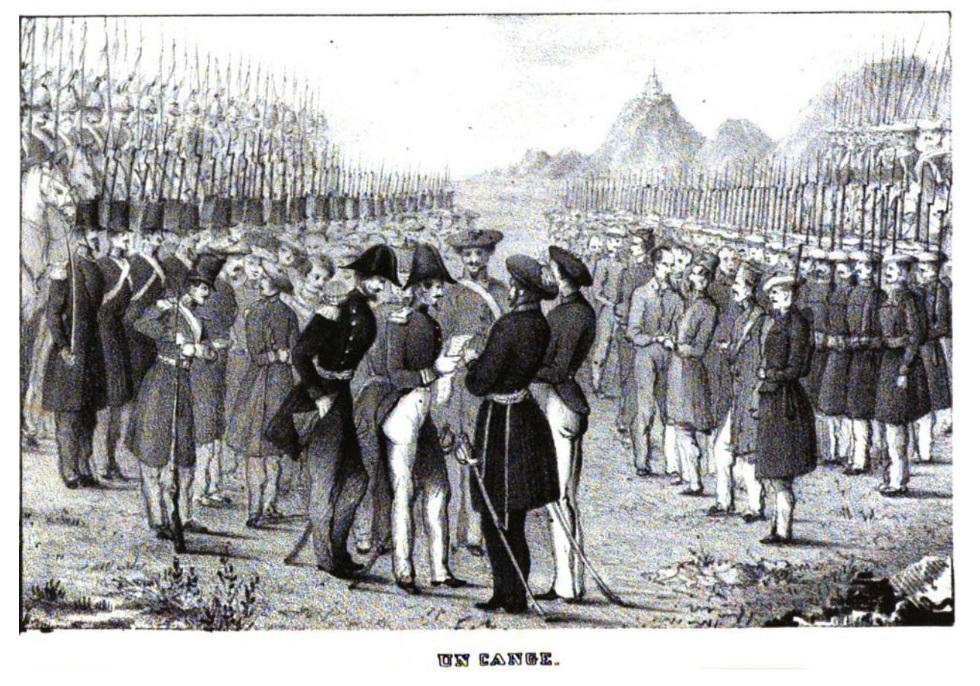
Exchange of prisoners for the Treaty of Lecera during the Carlist War. British diplomacy played a key role in the signing of this treaty, which sought to reduce the cruelty of the war.

The immediate implementation of the commitments assumed was the solution to the Portuguese problem. The Spanish question and the implementation of the additional articles would be more complicated. In general the "British support was more effective", although more diplomatic than economic or military. On this last issue there are some divergences in the historiography. For Vilar the military support was minimal and based on "waste troops". On the contrary, Rodríguez Alonso believes that the question should be investigated more and that one cannot minimize or speak of waste troops, summarizing the aid in "the sending of an Auxiliary Legion, with the sale of arms and supplies for the war and with the sending of ships to hinder the provisioning by sea of the Carlist troops". Menchén does affirm that the "British collaboration was very valuable at some moments in spite of the economic compensations", giving the example of its importance in resolving the blockade of Bilbao. The economic compensations referred to the inclusion of Spain in the British commercial system, something that did not materialize despite the fact that a commercial treaty was signed, but not ratified, in 1835.

There is agreement among historians to consider as unhelpful or even negative the help of France in the Spanish matter, especially because of its scant control of the frontiers. France seemed, at times, an ally of Carlism rather than of the Elizabethan government. López-Cordón goes so far as to say that it constitutes "indirectly [French aid] almost the most effective aid of the legitimist side," adding that the supposed aid was the sending of volunteers of little importance because of their low numbers and because in most cases they went over to the Carlist side.

French historiography explains the ambiguity of the aid by the European context: Louis Philippe I never lost the dialogue with Austria that would ask him to "restrain" the United Kingdom. According to these interests, he thought it necessary to maintain an attitude of moderation to avoid a generalization of the conflict. Throughout the development of the war, French intervention was sought in compliance with the agreement and even a change of government was made, passing to the moderate Ofalia, so that there would be greater ideological harmony. However, the intervention did not take place and this led to greater English dependence and influence for Spain. As for Portuguese cooperation in the Carlist War, it took a long time to be put into practice and was of little importance. It became effective only in 1836 and the following year the troops had to return due to internal uprisings in Portugal.

In addition to military aid, the United Kingdom played an important diplomatic role, especially in two areas. Firstly, in the attempt to reduce the excesses of both sides in the war, signing for this purpose two agreements, the Eliot and Segura Lécera, of "very relative effectiveness". Of greater importance is the second issue: intervention in the peace agreements that took the form of the Convention of Vergara, which in its final draft essentially included the terms of the British proposal, despite the fact that it was made without foreign mediation. Rodríguez Alonso shares this view, adding that the British diplomats "had played a fundamental role in the previous negotiations, but they took care that their work did not appear in the first place".

=== The "spirit" of the Quadruple Entente ===
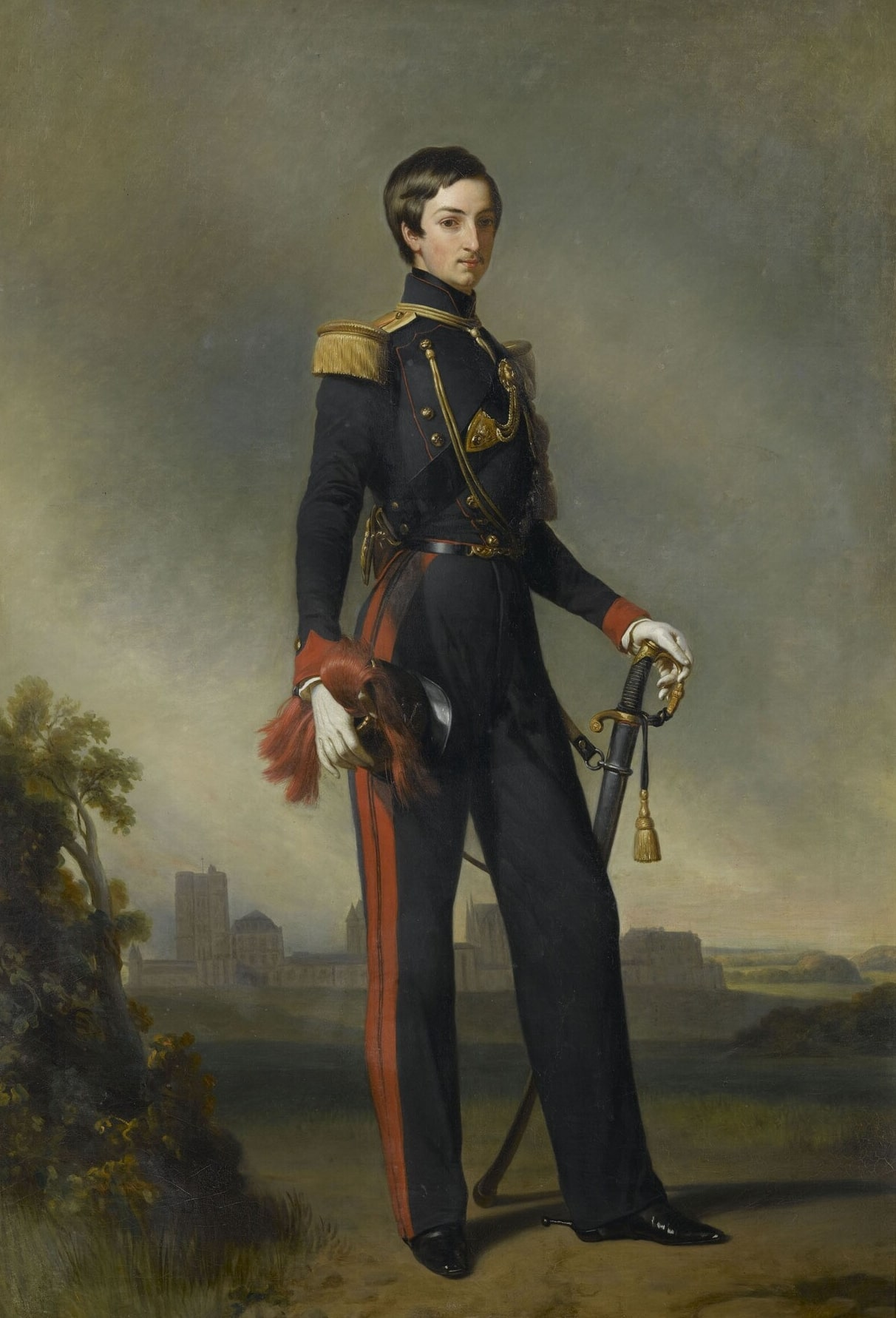
The Duke of Montpensier was one of the candidates that were considered to marry Isabella II. Although he was vetoed by the United Kingdom, he was able to marry the Infanta Luisa Fernanda, breaking the balance between the French and the English and ending the Entente between the two countries and, by extension, the Quadruple Alliance.

With the end of the war the treaty formally ceased to have effect, but neither side sought its cancellation. This was called the "spirit" of the Quadruple Alliance and took the form first of all of the growing Franco-British influence in Spain. In fact, there was a struggle between the two countries, which in the long run would lead to the end of the Entente, to the understanding between France and the United Kingdom. The struggle for greater influence in Spain was fundamentally due to two issues. On the one hand, economic pretensions, but above all because the strategic control of the peninsula ensured two fundamental routes: the Atlantic to Mediterranean route controlled by the United Kingdom from Gibraltar, and the French maritime route of Marseilles-Algiers. From 1830 onwards this second route would be vital for the French because of their conquests in Algeria, which made Spain "a key player in Mediterranean politics". For these reasons, any support in the peninsula was from the beginning the image of a rivalry, "any abandonment by one state was immediately exploited by another to gain advantages".

The end of the Entente between the French and the British, and with it of the "spirit" of the Quadruple Alliance, was also due to the weakness it had since its formation because of the opposing economic interests that made political union impossible. On the international level the first divergences, without causing serious problems in any case, occurred in Egypt, in 1840, when France supported Mehmet Ali in his attempt at independence from the Ottoman Empire, finally having to give in and abandon Ali.

At the Spanish level, for example, the divergences were noted in the influence of each State in the government. Thus, at the time of the fall of Espartero, it was understood that a period of French influence was opening up. In Portugal the struggles between the French and the English were always of less importance, since the traditional British influence continued to be maintained. The turning point of the Entente and of the "spirit" of the Quadruple Alliance also occurred in Spain, with the issue of the royal marriages that marked the definitive "Franco-British estrangement, to the point that the Quadruple Alliance effectively ceased to exist". These were the marriages of Queen Isabella II and the Infanta Luisa Fernanda. Both countries were trying to prevent the prince who married Isabella from harming their interests. Although in the end the Queen had to settle for a Spanish prince to avoid suspicions, France managed to get the Infanta to marry a Frenchman, the Duke of Montpensier, something that Narváez allowed "above all to prevent a possible British advantage from being taken advantage of by the progressives". The balance was thus broken by a question of party, the moderate, not of State.

The last invocation of the Quadruple Treaty occurred during the Portuguese crisis of 1846-1847 and is the practical demonstration of the loss of its "spirit" with the Franco-British estrangement. Spanish interventionism in Portugal worried the British, who feared the influence of France, and this led to an agreement to settle the Portuguese question again jointly, under the guise of the Quadruple Treaty. Spain and France thought of "plural intervention as the best way of dealing with British predominance".

Historians are categorical, expressing, as Menchén does, that "after 1847 we can no longer speak of the Quadruple". Moreover, the revolutionary events of 1848 changed the international panorama, especially for Spain: it would be impossible to maintain normal relations with a republican France and at last the range of relations with other powers outside the Quadruple would open up, as the absolutist courts looked favorably on Narváez's repressive action.

=== Effects on Spain's international and domestic policy ===
It would be in Spain where the Quadruple Alliance would leave the deepest mark, extending its consequences far beyond 1847. As Vilar summarizes, it not only "contributed decisively to the consolidation of the Spanish liberal regime", but "even determined the general orientation of Spanish foreign policy throughout the reign and, to a certain extent, until 1939". This general orientation can be summarized in two points. First, Spain is included in a specific system of alliances; Menchén calls it, with the significant title of his study, a "Western system" as opposed to an absolutist Eastern one. Second, it stopped taking sides between France and England and took a balanced position: "when France and the United Kingdom agree, we march with them; when they do not, Spain abstains". Regarding the consolidation of the Spanish liberal regime as the fruit of the "spirit" of the Quadruple Alliance, it is worth noting the British influence which, in any case, did not support the revolutionaries, but rather the more moderate among the progressives.

== See also ==
- Concession of Evoramonte
- The Two Georges, which features a Franco-Spanish dynastic union called the Holy Alliance

== Bibliography ==
- López-Cordón Cortezo, Mª Victoria. "La política exterior". La Era isabelina y el sexenio democrático. Historia de España Menéndez Pidal-Jover Zamora (in Spanish). Vol. XXXIV. Madrid: Espasa-Calpe. pp. 819–899.
- Menchén Barrios, María Teresa (1989). "La Cuádruple Alianza (1834). La Península en un sistema occidental". Cuadernos de la Escuela Diplomática (in Spanish). Vol. 2. Ministerio de Asuntos Exteriores, segunda época. pp. 31–51.
- Rodríguez Alonso, Manuel (1991). Gran Bretaña y España. Diplomacia, guerra, revolución y comercio (in Spanish). Madrid: Actas. p. 259.
- Vilar, Juan Bautista (2003). "España en la Europa de los nacionalismos: entre pequeña nación y potencia media (1834-1874)". Juan Carlos Pereira (coord.): La política exterior de España (1800-2003) (in Spanish). Barcelona: Ariel. pp. 401–420.
