= Galegos (Santa Maria) =

- Civil parish
- Location in Portugal
- Coordinates: 41.5627°N 8.5775°W
- Country: Portugal
- Region: Norte
- Intermunic. comm.: Cávado
- District: Braga
- Municipality: Barcelos

Area
  - Total: 4.59 km^{2} (1.77 sq mi)

Population (2011)
  - Total: 2,987
  - Density: 651/km^{2} (1,690/sq mi)
- Time zone: UTC+00:00 (WET)
  - Summer (DST): UTC+01:00 (WEST)

Galegos (Santa Maria) is a Portuguese freguesia ("civil parish"), located in the municipality of Barcelos. The population in 2011 was 2,987, in an area of 4.59 km^{2} (1.77 sq mi).
