= Galegos (São Martinho) =

- Civil parish
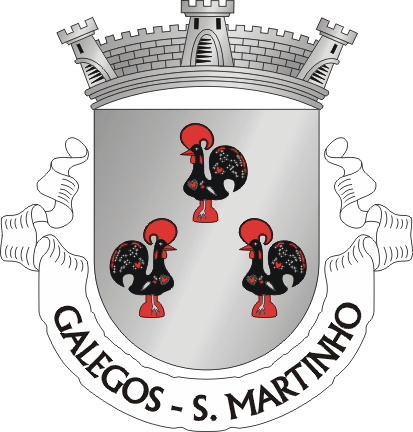
- Coat of arms

- Location in Portugal
- Coordinates: 41.555°N 8.567°W
- Country: Portugal
- Region: Norte
- Intermunic. comm.: Cávado
- District: Braga
- Municipality: Barcelos

Area
  - Total: 3.12 km^{2} (1.20 sq mi)

Population (2011)
  - Total: 1,930
  - Density: 620/km^{2} (1,600/sq mi)
- Time zone: UTC+00:00 (WET)
  - Summer (DST): UTC+01:00 (WEST)
- Website: www.galegossmartinho.maisbarcelos.pt

Galegos (São Martinho) is a Portuguese parish, located in the municipality of Barcelos. The population in 2011 was 1,930, in an area of 3.12 km^{2}.
