= Póvoa de Lanhoso =

- Municipality
- Town of Póvoa de Lanhoso
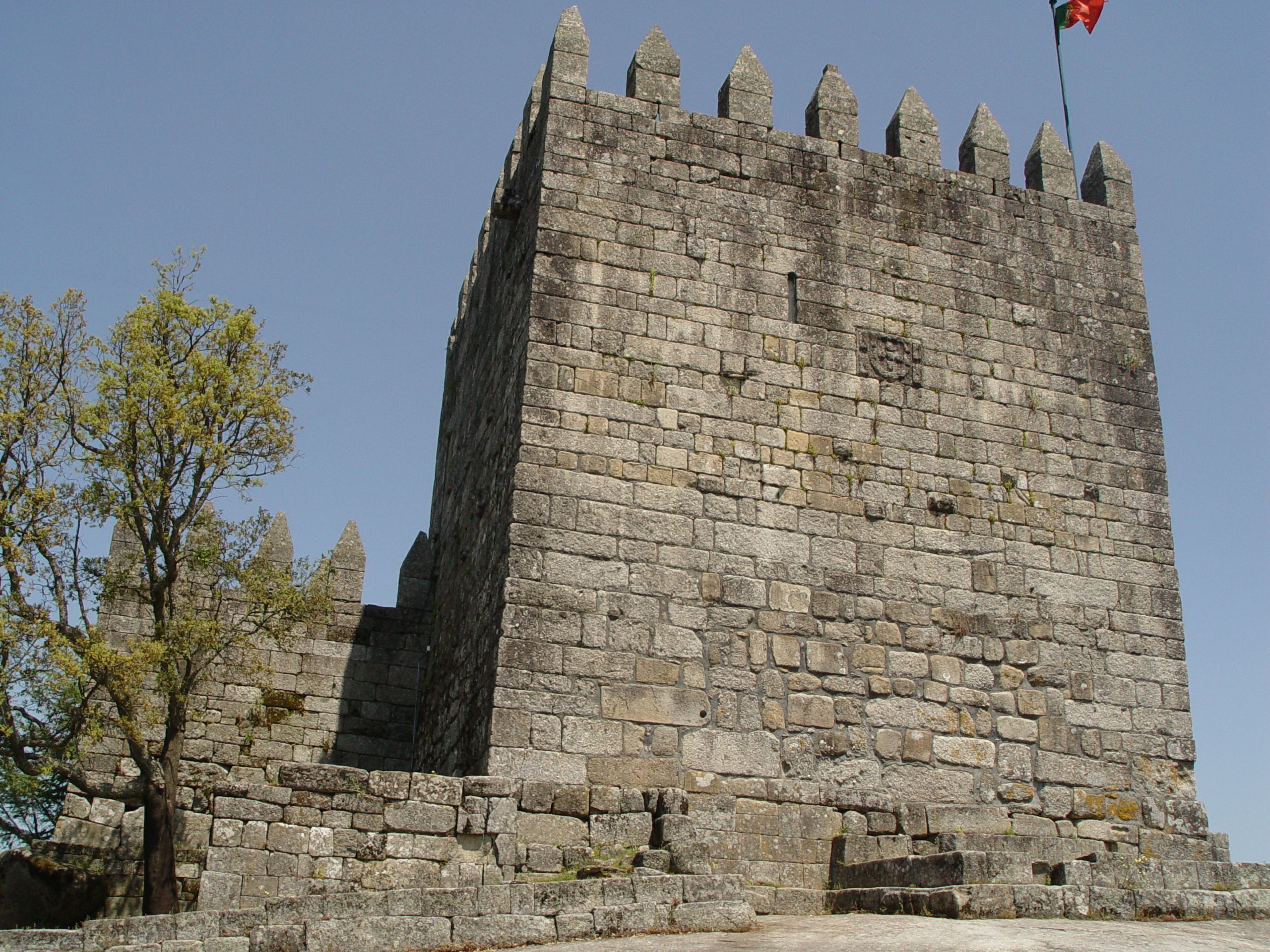

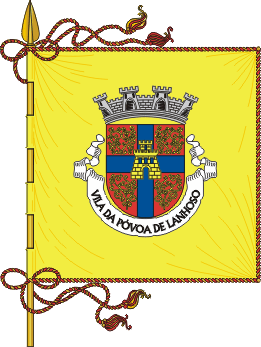
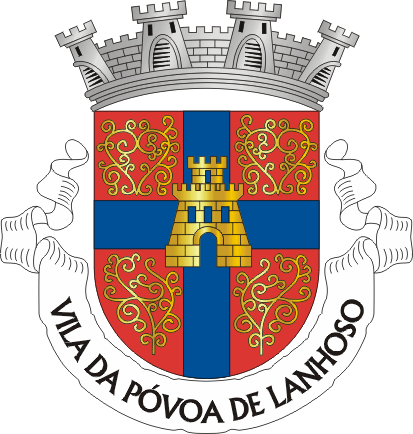
- Flag Coat of arms
- Interactive map of Póvoa de Lanhoso
- Coordinates: 41°34′N 8°16′W
- Country: Portugal
- Region: Norte
- Intermunic. comm.: Ave
- District: Braga
- Parishes: 22

Government
  - President: Avelino Silva (PSD)

Area
  - Total: 134.65 km^{2} (51.99 sq mi)

Population (2011)
  - Total: 21,886
  - Density: 162.54/km^{2} (420.98/sq mi)
- Time zone: UTC+00:00 (WET)
  - Summer (DST): UTC+01:00 (WEST)
- Website: www.cm-povoadelanhoso.pt

Póvoa de Lanhoso (Portuguese pronunciation: [ˈpɔvuɐ ðɨ lɐˈɲozu]), officially Town of Póvoa de Lanhoso (Portuguese: Vila da Póvoa de Lanhoso), is a town and municipality in the district of Braga in northern Portugal. The population in 2011 was 21,886, in an area of 134.65 km².

The present Mayor is Avelino Silva, elected by the Social Democratic Party. The municipal holiday is March 19.

== Economy ==
Agriculture, forestry and tourism are important economic activities in the municipality. Light industry is present too. Prozis, a multinational sports nutrition company headquartered in Esposende, has a major industrial plant in Póvoa de Lanhoso.

== Parishes ==
The municipality is subdivided into the following 22 parishes:

- Águas Santas e Moure
- Calvos e Frades
- Campos e Louredo
- Covelas
- Esperança e Brunhais
- Ferreiros
- Fonte Arcada e Oliveira
- Galegos
- Garfe
- Geraz do Minho
- Lanhoso
- Monsul
- Póvoa de Lanhoso
- Rendufinho
- Santo Emilião
- São João de Rei
- Serzedelo
- Sobradelo da Goma
- Taíde
- Travassos
- Verim, Friande e Ajude
- Vilela

== Notable people ==
- Gonçalo Sampaio (1865 in São Gens de Calvos – 1937) a Portuguese botanist.
- Vítor Machado Ferreira (born 2000), known as Vitinha a footballer with over 60 club caps and one for Portugal
