= Ave (intermunicipal community) =

- Intermunicipal community
- Logo
- Interactive map of Ave
- Location in Portugal
- Coordinates: 41.44°N 8.30°W
- Country: Portugal
- Region: Northern Portugal
- Established: 2009
- Seat: Guimarães
- Municipalities: 8

Area
  - Total: 1,451.31 km^{2} (560.35 sq mi)

Population (2011)
  - Total: 425,411
  - Density: 293.122/km^{2} (759.183/sq mi)
- Time zone: UTC+00:00 (WET)
  - Summer (DST): UTC+01:00 (WEST)
- Website: cim-ave.pt

The Comunidade Intermunicipal do Ave (Portuguese pronunciation: [ˈavɨ]) is an administrative division in Portugal. It was created in 2009. It takes its name from the Ave River. The seat of the intermunicipal community is Guimarães. Ave comprises parts of the former districts of Braga and Vila Real. The population in 2011 was 425,411, in an area of 1,451.31 km².

Ave is also a NUTS3 subregion of the Norte Region. Since January 2015, the NUTS 3 subregion covers the same area as the intermunicipal community.

Ave is bordered to the north by Cávado, to the east by Alto Tâmega, to the southeast by Douro, to the south by Tâmega e Sousa and the southwest by the Metropolitan Area of Porto. It is a densely populated area and one of the more industrialized in the country. The main industries are the textile industry, clothing and apparel. Part of the historical region of Minho, it is centered on the historic city of Guimarães (the birthplace of Portuguese nationalism).

== Municipalities ==
The CIM Ave is composed of 8 municipalities:

| Municipality | Population (2011) | Area (km²) |
|---|---|---|
| Cabeceiras de Basto | 16,710 | 241.82 |
| Fafe | 50,633 | 219.08 |
| Guimarães | 158,124 | 240.95 |
| Mondim de Basto | 7,493 | 172.08 |
| Póvoa de Lanhoso | 21,886 | 134.65 |
| Vieira do Minho | 12,997 | 216.44 |
| Vila Nova de Famalicão | 133,832 | 201.59 |
| Vizela | 23,736 | 24.70 |
| Total | 425,411 | 1,451.31 |
