= Battle of Vilanova =

1658 Portuguese Restoration War battle

- Part of the Portuguese Restoration War
Date	17 September 1658
Location	Near Vila Nova de Cerveira, Portugal 41°59′33″N 8°40′21″W
Result	Spanish victory

Belligerents
Portugal	Spain

Commanders and leaders
(Portugal) Count of Castelo Melhor	(Spain) Marquis of Viana

Strength
5,500 infantry, 500 cavalry	4,000 infantry, 3,000 militia, 2,000 sappers, 700 cavalry

Casualties and losses
250 killed 380 wounded 260 prisoners	38 killed 60 wounded

The Battle of Vilanova took place on 17 September 1658 during the Portuguese Restoration War near the Fort of São Luis de Gonzaga, located downstream from Tui on the southern bank of the Minho River. A Spanish army commanded by the Governor of Galicia, Rodrigo Pimentel, Marquis of Viana, entered Portuguese territory and confronted a Portuguese army led by João Rodrigues de Vasconcelos e Sousa, 2nd Count of Castelo Melhor. The Spanish were victorious and proceeded over the following months to capture Monção, Salvaterra de Miño and other Portuguese strongholds.

== Background ==
After the death of King John IV of Portugal in 1656, various Spanish offensives were launched against Portuguese territory, mainly from Extremadura, but also from Galicia, where a second front was opened to force the Portuguese to divide their forces. The Spanish governor of Galicia, Vicente de Gonzaga y Doria, crossed in the Miño river in command of 6,000 infantry and 900 cavalry soldiers with the aim of preventing the Portuguese army from sending reinforcements to its garrisons in Alentejo. He laid siege to the town of Salvatierra de Miño, occupied by Portugal since 1642, but the lack of forces that his army suffered forced him to lift the siege. However, he ordered a fort to be built atop of the hill of São Pedro da Torre, near the Portuguese riverside of the Minho river. The fort, named São Luis de Gonzaga, was located a league from Valença do Minho and Vila Nova de Cerveira. In 1657 a Portuguese army under Count of Castelo Melhor besieged the fort, achieving its surrender in the following year. Planned operations against Tui were frustrated, nevertheless, because of the Spanish conquest in Alentejo of Olivenza and Mourão.

A new governor for Galicia, don Rodrigo Pimentel, Marquis of Viana, was appointed by King Philip IV in May 1658 with instructions of recover Salvatierra de Miño and other important towns of the area. Pimentel was seconded in the leadership of his army by don Baltasar de Rojas y Pantoja, Maestre de Campo General; and Maestre de Campo don Francisco de Castro, who had previous experience against Portuguese armies. Marquis of Viana established his headquarters in Tui, where a force consisting of 4,000 infantry, 3,000 militia, 2,000 sappers and 700 cavalry was gathered. The commander of the cavalry was the Portuguese loyalist don Bernardino de Meneses, Marquis of Peñalba, Count of Tarouca and Grandee of Portugal.

== Battle ==
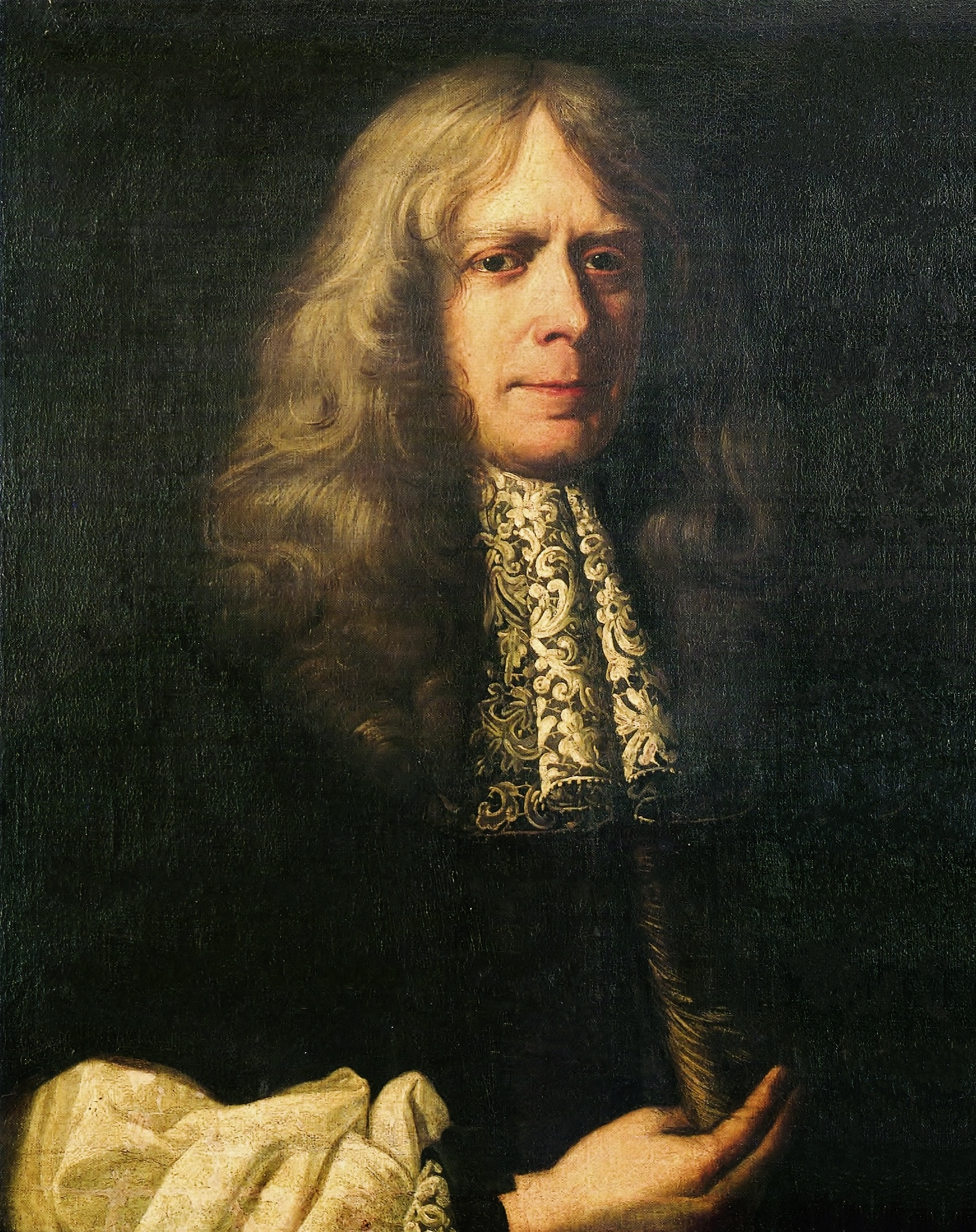
Luís de Vasconcelos e Sousa, 3rd Count of Castelo Melhor, whose father commanded the Portuguese army at the Battle of Vilanova.

The Spanish army departed Pontevedra on 6 September and entered Portuguese territory on 12 September having crossed the Miño river through a pontoon bridge. Three Portuguese forts located throughout their lines were assaulted and captured by the Tercio of Rojas y Pantoja in a skirmish which cost the Spanish 20 men, among them don Diego Suárez de Deza, Señor de Castrelos, and two infantry captains, as opposed to 100 Portuguese dead.

On 17 September the Portuguese army under João Rodrigues de Vasconcelos e Sousa, Count of Castelo Melhor, numbering 5,500 infantry and 500 cavalry men, approached a league from the Spanish. Count of Peñalba was then sent to inspect the field in command of 8 cavalry squadrons, which were led by don Francisco de la Cueva, don Francisco Taboada, don Álvaro de Anaya, don Francisco Marcos de Velasco, don Antonio de Mocoso, don Andrés de Robles and don Pedro Niño. They were accompanied by 8 battalions of the tercios. Teniente Maestro the Campo General don Francisco Buzo, meanwhile, was ordered to skirmish with the Portuguese in command of 400 musketeers. The maneouver of Count of Peñalba was covered by Teniente Maestro de Campo General don Francisco Rojo with his Tercio, while don Francisco de la Cueva moved on the opposite flank with the same aim.

Marquis of Viana led the major attack from Vila Nova de Cerveira; the Maestro de Campo General commanded a second attack from Valença do Minho with Comisario General don Cristóbal Zorrilla, various other officers and 1,000 soldiers belonging to the Tercios of don Gabriel Sarmiento de Quirós and dos Luís Pérez de Vivero. Don Francisco Buzo, whose musketeers were harassing the Portuguese army, reported to Marquis of Viana that Count of Castelo Melhor seemed to have intentions of withdraw with his army. Count of Peñalba with his cavalry and Teniente Maestre de Campo General don Pedro de Aldao with the infantry, in an attempt to avoid it, found the Portuguese entrenched in a slope and attacked their formations until break them. The Portuguese cavalry was defeated; then the infantry fled. 18 Spanish were killed and about 60 or 63 wounded. Count of Castelo Melhor lost 900 men: 250 killed, 380 wounded and 260 prisoners, among who were 28 officers including Count of Vimieiro.

== Aftermath ==
The day after the battle, the Spanish army captured the Tower of Nogueira and four other watchtowers, as well as some small villages. The Count of Castelo Melhor retreated to Covas de Ponte de Lima, being pursued by the Spanish cavalry, who plundered the place before rejoining the main force.

On 30 September, having reorganised his army, the Marquis of Viana laid siege to the fortress of Lapela, which had been his first objective. The village was taken on 6 October with its garrison of 150 soldiers, who were imprisoned in Galicia. Monção was also besieged, falling in Spanish hands on 7 January 1659 after a costly and expensive siege for both countries. The Count of Castelo Melhor died of illness during the winter and could not prevent the fall of the town. The main objective of the campaign, the recapture of Salvatierra de Miño, was achieved on 17 February.
