= Champalimaud =

Champalimaud is a surname. Notable people with the name include:

- António Champalimaud (1918–2004), Portuguese banker and industrialist
- José Joaquim Champalimaud (1771–1825), Portuguese marshal in the Napoleonic Wars

== See also ==
- Champalimaud Foundation, a private biomedical research foundation created by the will of António Champalimaud
