= Church of Saint Mary of the Angels =

Heritage-listed church in Valença, Portugal

- Igreja de Santa Maria dos Angos (Portuguese)
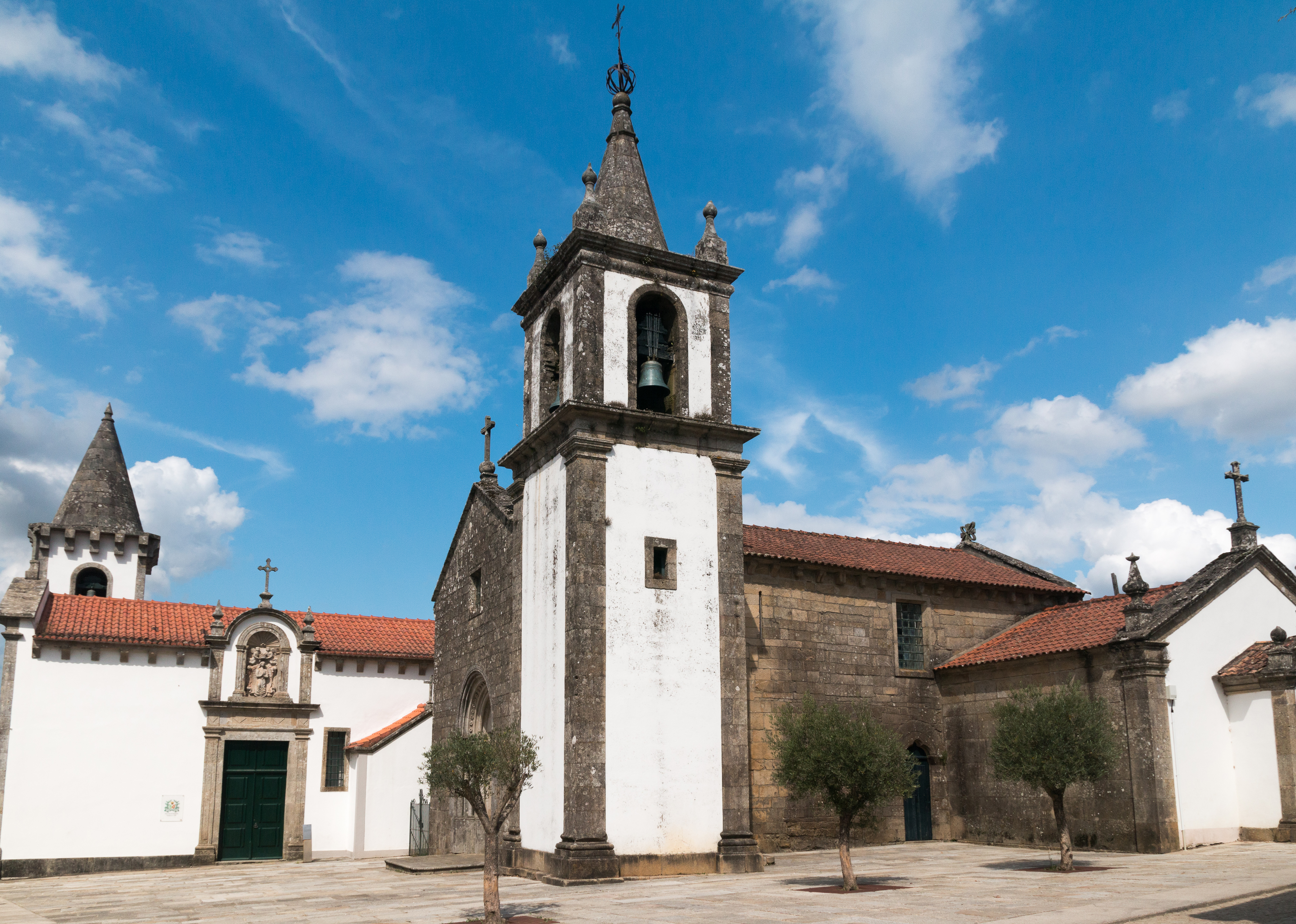
- As viewed from the square

Religion
- Affiliation: Roman Catholic
- Diocese: Diocese of Viana do Castelo
- Rite: Roman
- Ecclesiastical or organisational status: Parish Church
- Year consecrated: 1276

Location
- Location: Valença, Portugal
- Interactive map of Church of Saint Mary of the Angels
- Coordinates: 42°01′57.733″N 8°38′43.351″W

Architecture
- Type: Church
- Style: Romanesque, Baroque, Neoclassical, Revival
- Completed: 1276
- Portuguese National Monument
- Official name: Igreja Paroquial de Valença / Igreja de Santa Maria dos Anjos
- Reference no.: 6437

Website
- www.monumentos.gov.pt

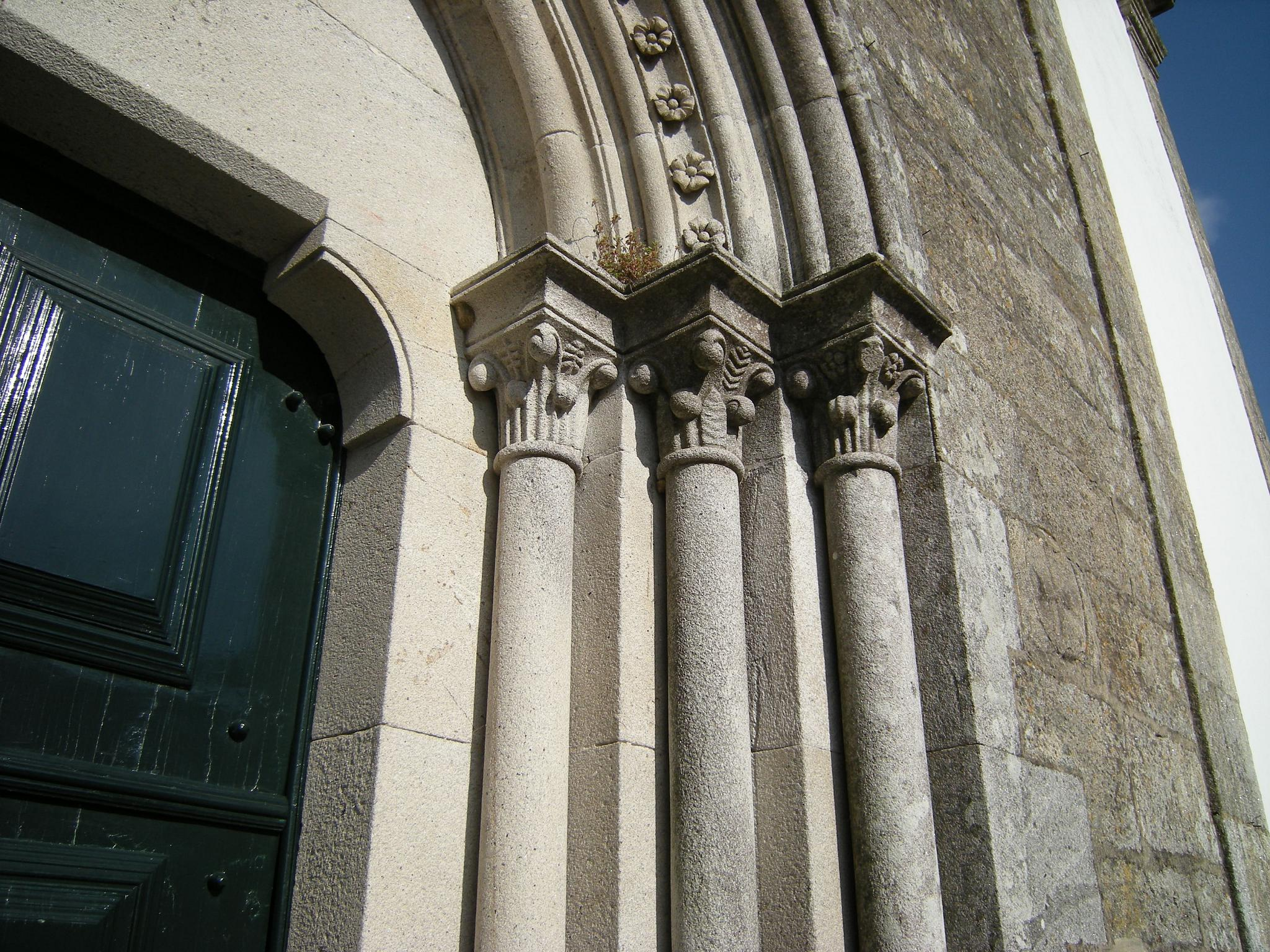
Main door, detail

The Church of Saint Mary of the Angels, also known as the Parish Church of Valença, is a historic religious building located within the walled area of the Valencia de Minho. It is located next to the Gaviarra Gate (the northernmost door of the wall) and represents the main church of the town in the Minho region.

It has been classified as a National Monument.

== Building ==
The building has medieval origins, having been founded around 1276. and consecrated that year. The architecture of the building is a mixture of styles, presenting characteristics Romanesque on the portal of the main façade, as well as late Baroque, Neoclassical and Revival elements. The interior, with a longitudinal plan and a single nave, has a wooden floor delimited by granite guides and a polychrome carved main altarpiece. Also noteworthy is the old baptismal font in the baptistery and the Chapel of the Carlas, located externally.

Particular this church, is the contrast between a simple exterior appearance and an interior ornate and spiritual, which conveys peace and calm. Presently (2026), the church restoration work are being carried out. Next to the main façade is the 18th century Chapel of Mercy, which houses a small museum of sacred art.

== Gallery ==
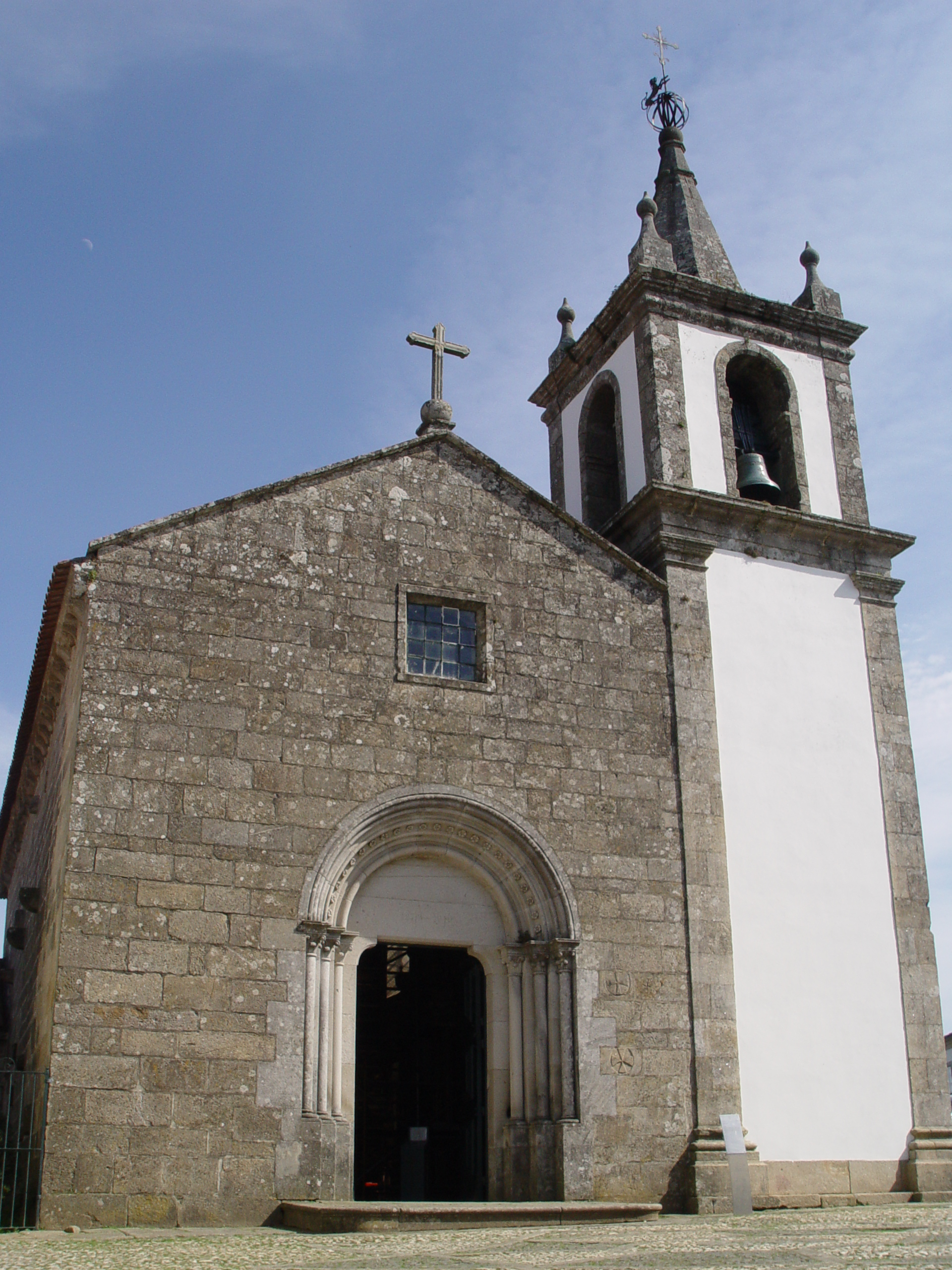
Funeral Chapel (north)

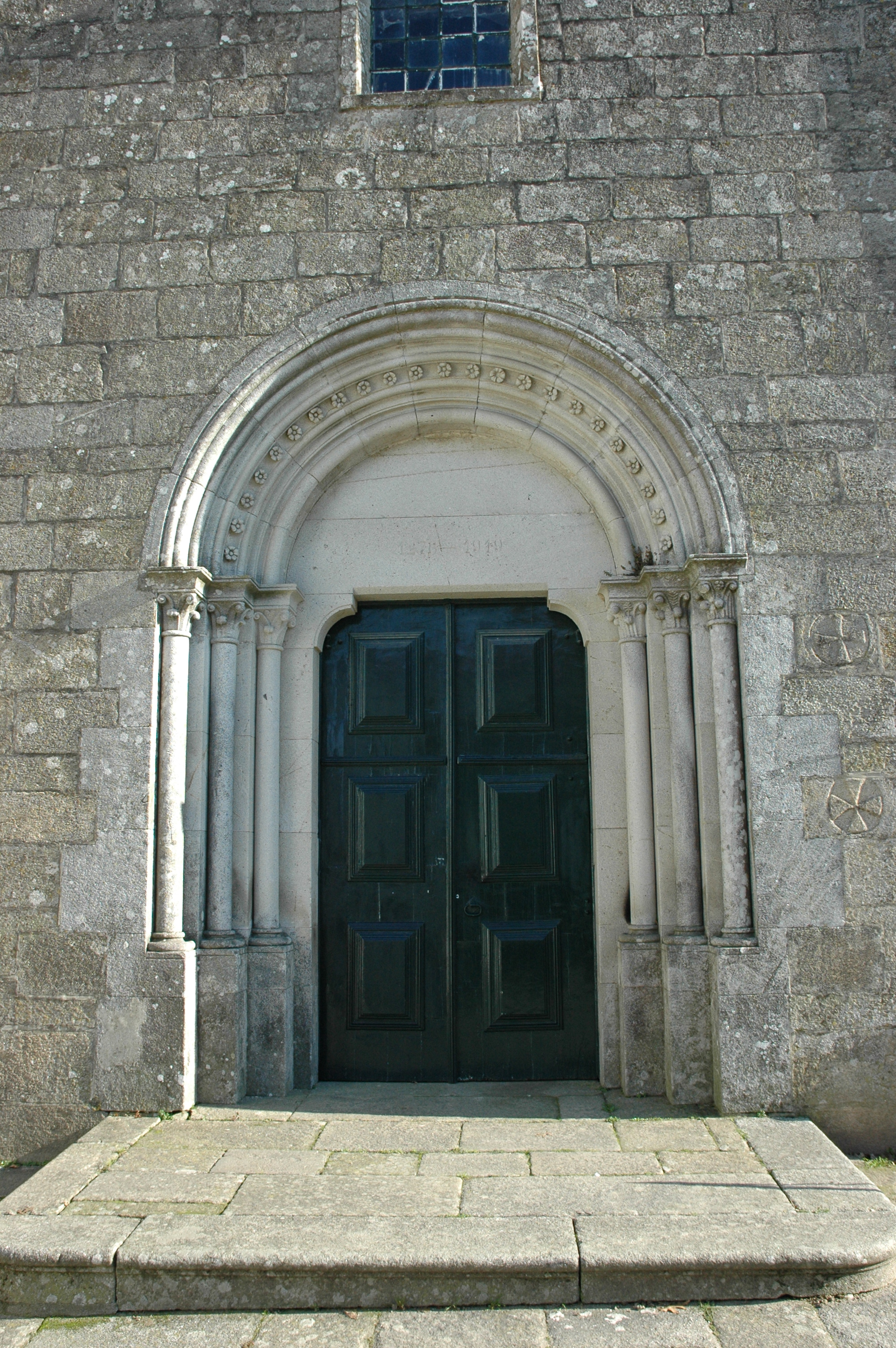
Main Door

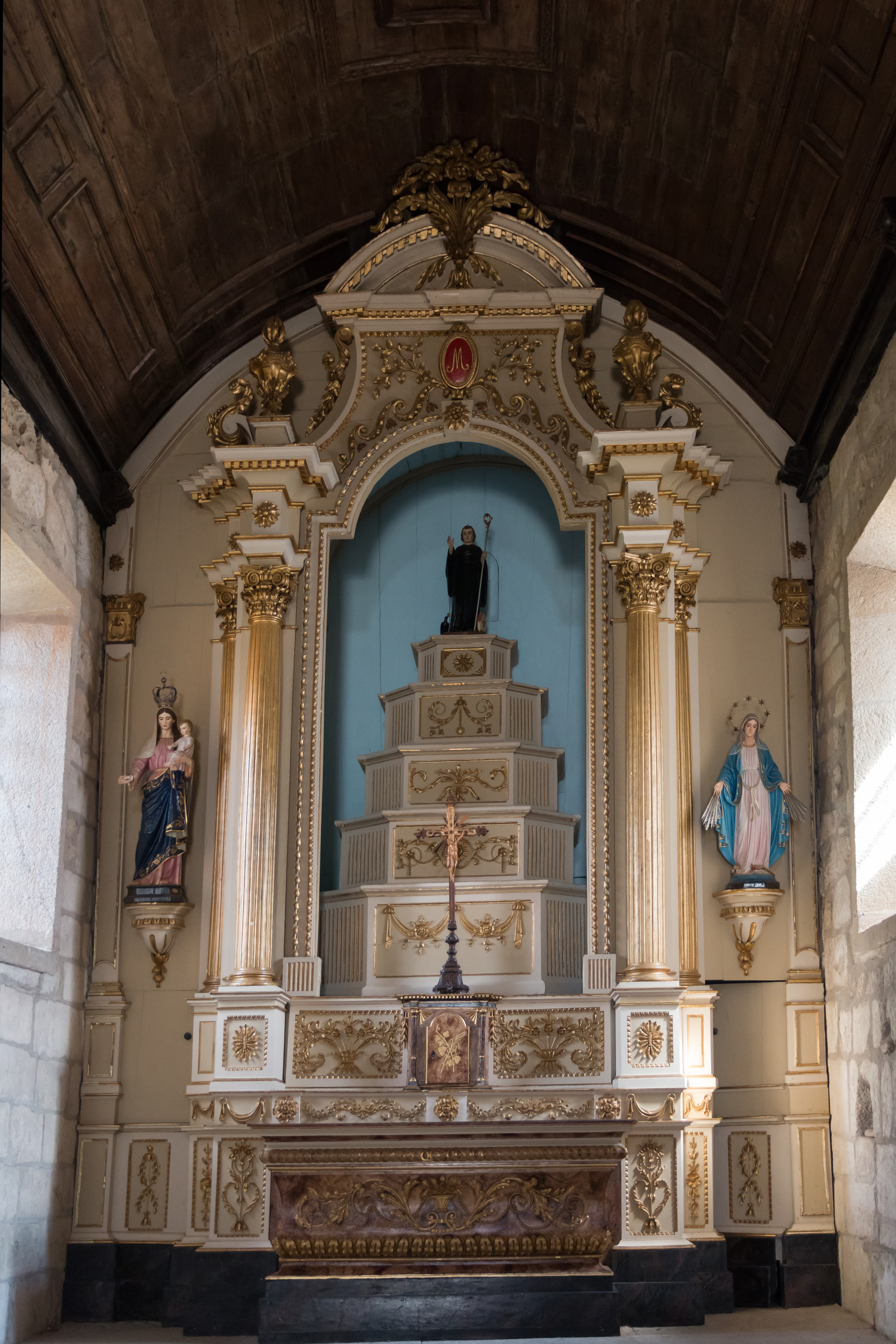
Main Alter

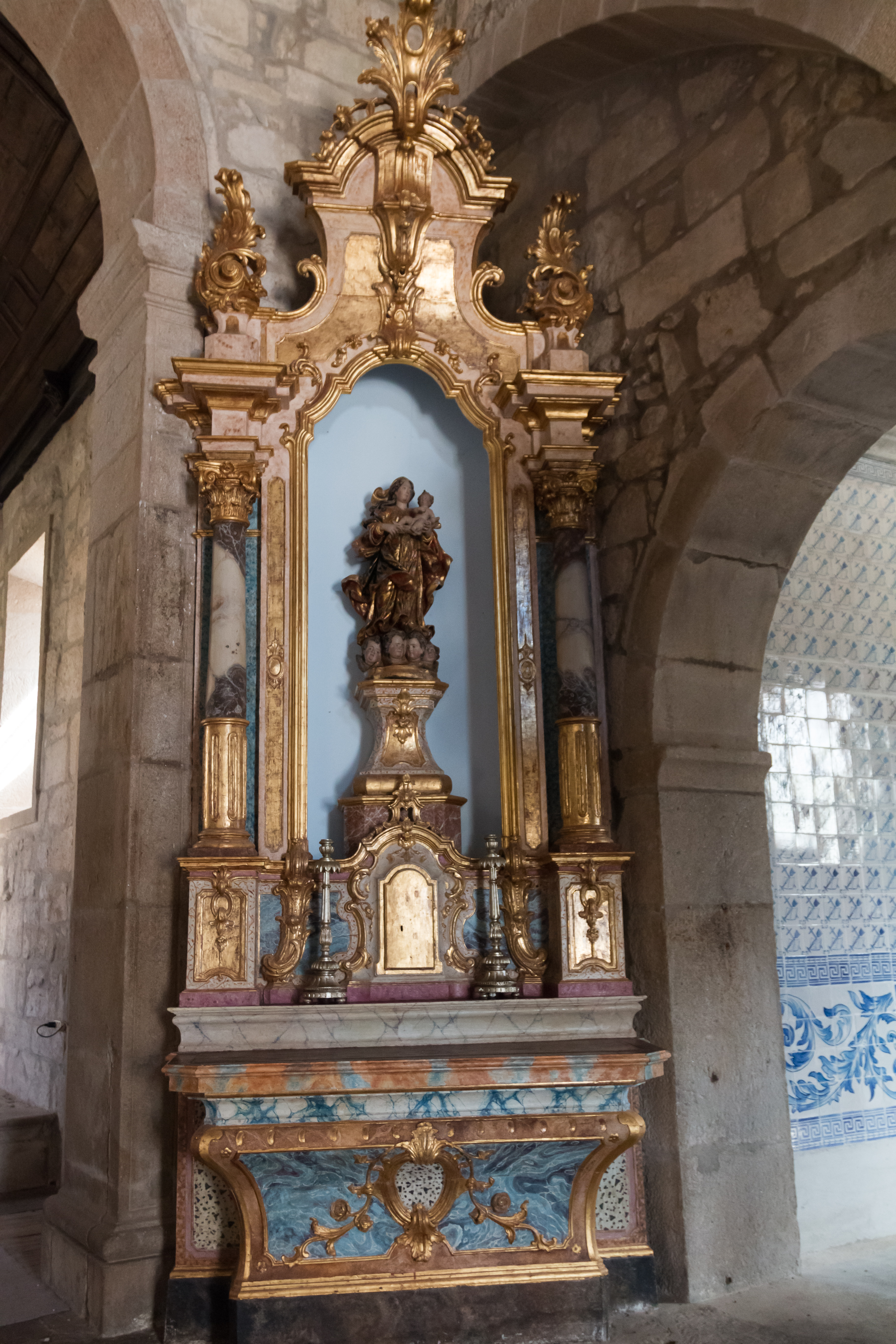
Saint Mary of the Angels Altar

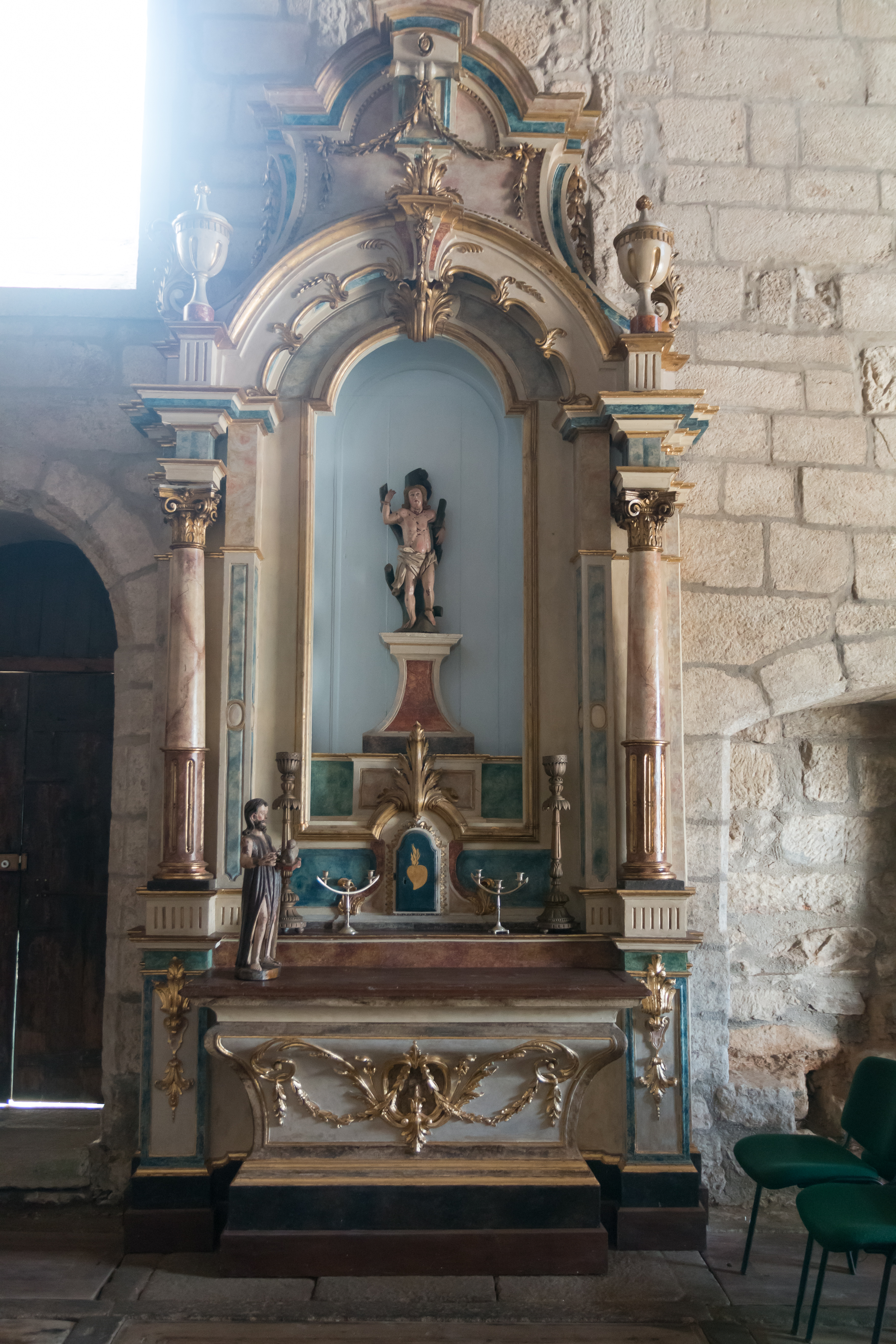
Saint Andrew's Altar

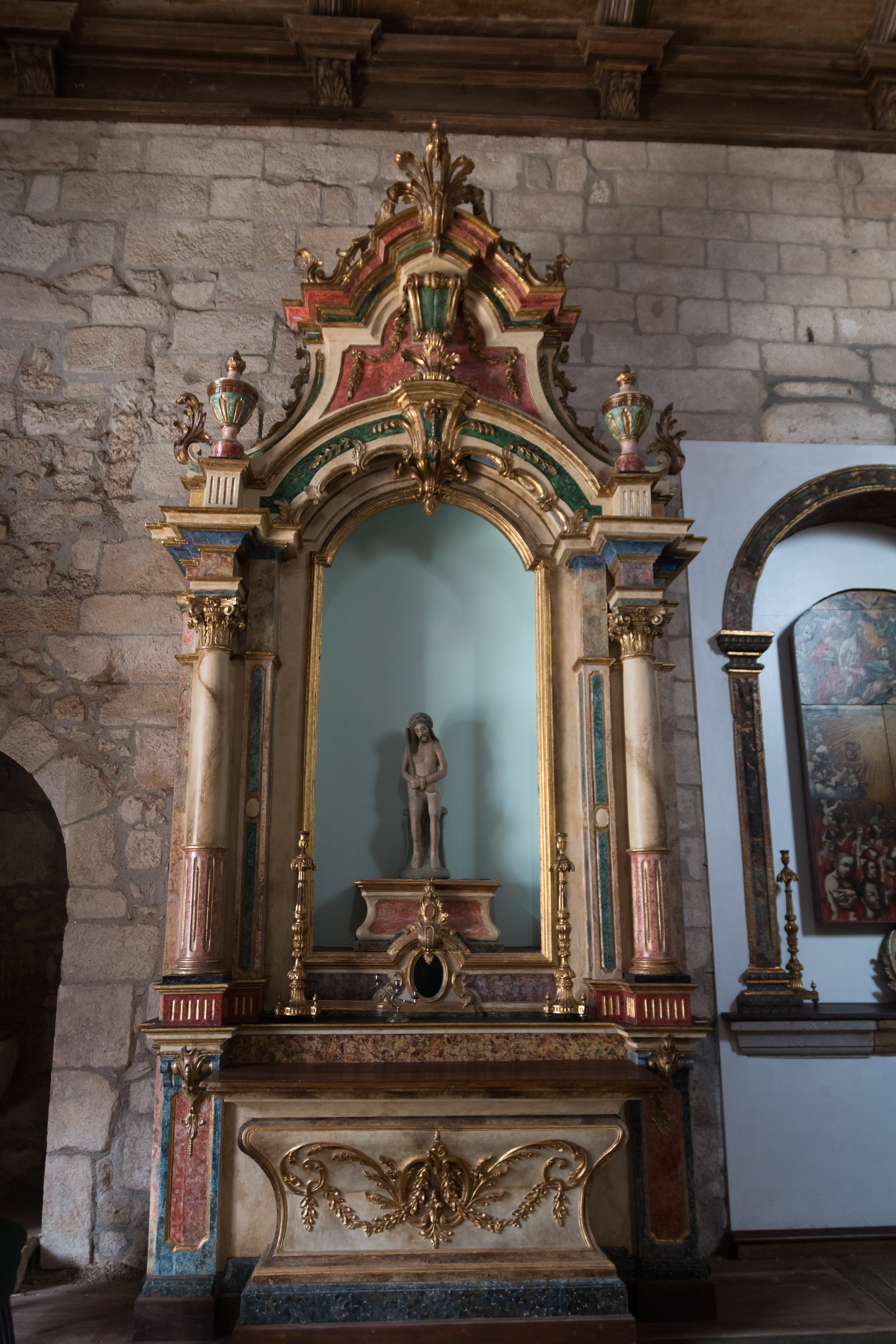
Christ on the Cross Altar

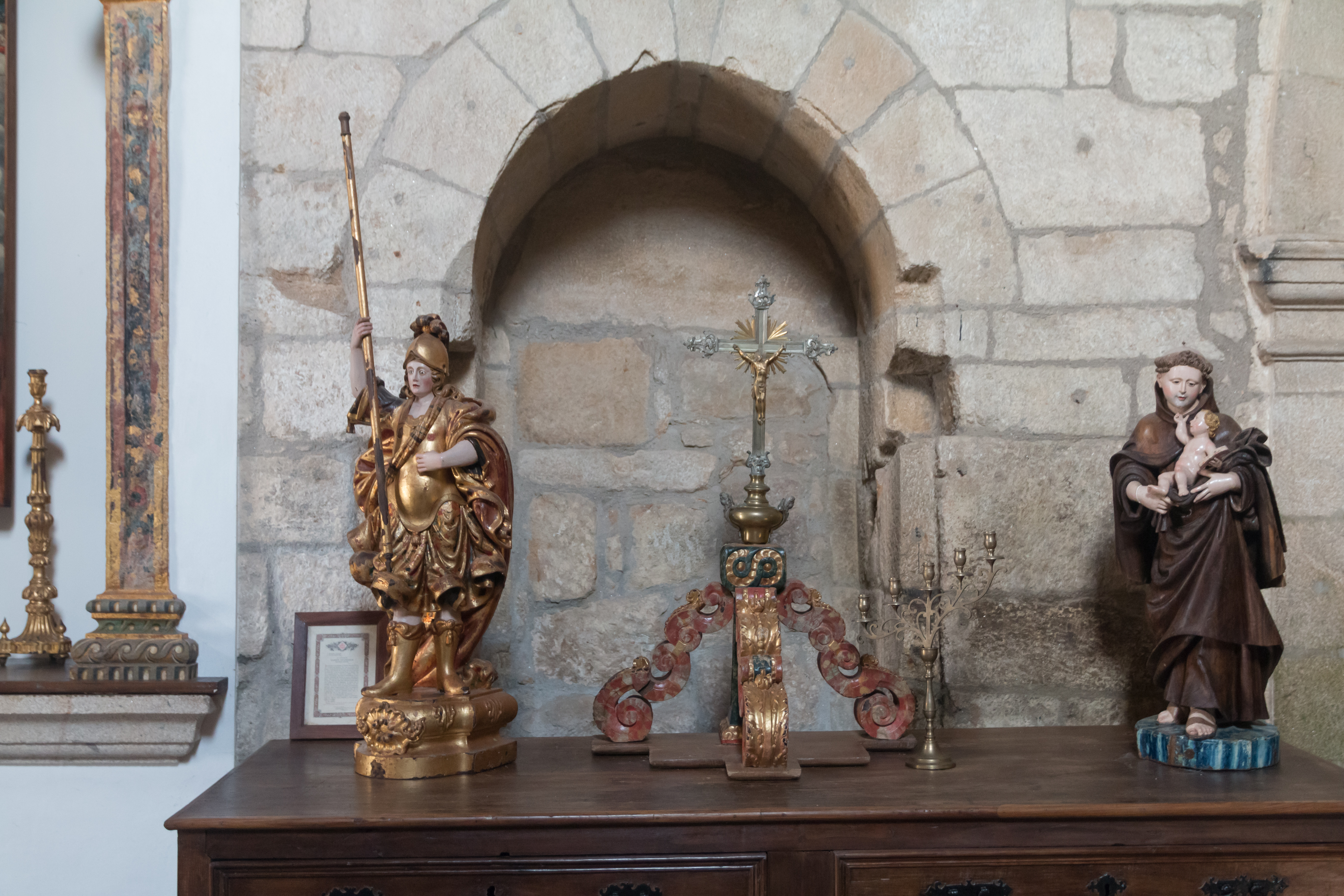
Statues of St Catherine and St Anthony
