= Fontoura =

- Civil parish
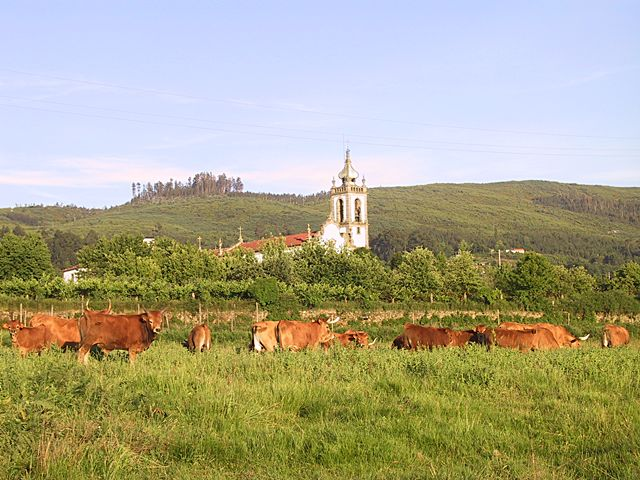
- Parochial church

- Location in Portugal
- Coordinates: 41.956°N 8.633°W
- Country: Portugal
- Region: Norte
- Intermunic. comm.: Alto Minho
- District: Viana do Castelo
- Municipality: Valença

Area
  - Total: 9.17 km^{2} (3.54 sq mi)

Population (2011)
  - Total: 751
  - Density: 81.9/km^{2} (212/sq mi)
- Time zone: UTC+00:00 (WET)
  - Summer (DST): UTC+01:00 (WEST)
- Postal code: 4930
- Area code: 251
- Patron: São Miguel
- Website: www.jf-fontoura.com

Fontoura is a civil parish (freguesia) in the municipality of Valença, in northern Portugal, on the southern boundary of Paredes de Coura. The population in 2011 was 751, in an area of 9.17 km². There were 668 registered voters on 31 December 2003.

== History ==
The parish's origins date back to the pre-Roman era; several archaeological artefacts were discovered in the area around Grove, that trace back to this period. In addition to the remains of ceramic pottery and ash/coal, the settlement, on a round hilltop, was assumed to be the site of a fortified castro structure.

Similarly, along the flanks of Monte São Gabriel near Telhões early signs of settlement in the region were found, including bricks with wedges of yellow metal, attributed to early Moorish occupation in the area.

With the founding of the Kingdom of Portugal, the local lands were dotted with small enclaves; the area of Boriz, of Germanic origin, evolved from a proto-cultural settlement called Baudiricus, and was typical of the 9th-10th century settlements in the area. As tradition holds, the name Fontoura originated from a spring located near to the Casa Alta, whose waters contained gold particles or were prized for quality. Derived from Fonte d'Ouro (Golden Fountain), the settlement evolved over time into Fontoura. Reguengo, another settlement, was linked to Elizabeth of Portugal who stayed in the region on her return from a pilgrimage to Santiago de Compostela.

José Joaquim Champalimaud Nussane Lyra e Castra, a native son, constructed his magnificent mansion in Bárrio, in addition to patronizing the local Chapel of São José.

In 1258, the Church of São Miguel de Fontoura was cited as one of the churches belonging to the diocese of Tui, during the Inquiries of King Afonso III of Portugal. A 1320 catalogue of such churches, prepared for King Denis of Portugal, rated the São Miguel church for tax purposes at 100 pounds.

In 1444, John I of Portugal obtained permission from the Pope, who dismembered the territory from the diocese of Tui, and transferred its administration to the diocese of Ceuta (where it remained until 1512). In that year, the Archbishop of Braga, Diogo de Sousa, gave Henrique, Bishop of Ceuta, the ecclesiastical district of Olivença, receiving in exchange Valença do Minho, an arrangement approved in 1513 by Pope Leo X. Between 1514 and 1532, Archbishop Diogo de Sousa assessed the property of the church of Fontoura pertaining to the diocese of Braga at 230 réis. By 1546, in the assessment records of São Miguel de Fontoura the church yielded 60,000 réis.

In a 1580 copy of the census, friar Baltasar Limpo indicated that São Miguel was administered by laymen, and according to Américo Costa, its proceeds belonged to the heirs of Gabriel Pereira de Castro. The 1862 parish statistics, indicate that Vieiras Teles of Lisbon, and Barbosa Aboim of Barcelos, were beneficiaries of the proceeds.

By 1839, Fontoura was a parish of the district of Monção, until it was transferred to the administration of Valença in 1852.

== Geography ==
Fontoura is located ten kilometres from the municipal seat of Valença, occupying a fertile 913 hectares, dominated by the cultivation of corn and vineyards. In addition, abundant grasslands in the area are suitable for raising of goats.

The EN201 motorway crosses most of the parish from north to south, while the EN13 and A3 roads are located close to the parish. It consists of several residential and urban agglomerations (hamlets and neighbourhoods), such as: Rio Torto, Ínsua, Casa Gonçalo, Boriz, Cortinhas, Reguengo, Bárrio, Prado, Valinha, Pereira, Portela, Gontomil, Grove, Maga, Outeiro and Paço.

== Economy ==
The community is primarily focused on agricultural activities, with local weaving becoming a productive secondary industry associated with the economy. This includes handicrafts such linen manufacturing. The people are engaged in growing small domestic crops, weaving, carpentry, metal work, construction and retail trade.

== Culture ==
On the last Sunday of each month, the local community participates in the local fairs. Traditional fairs are very rooted in the economic habits of the population with a large attendance of people from throughout the region. The community also celebrates the festival of São Gabriel.

== Architecture ==
=== Civic ===
- Residence of Casa Alta (Casa Alta)
- Residence of Gonçalo (Casa do Gonçalo)
- Estate of São Gabriel (Quinta de São Gabriel)

=== Religious ===
- Chapel of Nossa Senhora da Guia (Capela da Nossa Senhora da Guia)
- Chapel of São Gabriel (Capela de São Gabriel)
- Chapel of São José (Capela de São José)
- Chapel of Poço do Monte (Capela de Poço do Monte)
- Chapel of Pópulo (Capela de Pópulo)
- Chapel of Senhor dos Aflitos (Capela do Senhor dos Aflitos)
- Cross of the Cemetery of Fontoura (Cruzeiro do Cemitério de Fontoura)
- Cross of the Centenary (Cruzeiro dos Centenários em Fontoura)
- Church of São Miguel (Igreja Matriz de Fontoura/Igreja de São Miguel)
