= José Joaquim Champalimaud =

Portuguese general (1771–1825)

- Born: 4 October 1771; Valença, Portugal
- Died: 5 May 1825 (aged 53); Portalegre, Portugal
- Military career
- Allegiance: Portugal
- Branch: Portuguese Army
- Service years: 1790–1815
- Rank: Marechal de campo
- Unit: 21st Infantry Regiment
- Conflicts: French Revolutionary Wars; War of the Second Coalition; War of the Oranges; Napoleonic Wars; Peninsular War

José Joaquim Champalimaud de Nussane de Sousa Lira e Castro de Barbosa (Valença, Fontoura 4 October 1771 – Portalegre, Elvas 5 May 1825) was a Portuguese Army officer during the Napoleonic Wars.

== History ==
José was the son of Lieutenant Colonel Paulo José Champalimaud de Nussane (engineer of Praça of Valença) and Clara Maria de Sousa Lira e Castro, who originated from the parish of Ferreira, in the municipality of Paredes de Coura. Born in 1771, José Joaquim enlisted, still being a child, in the 21st Infantry Regiment; garrisoned in his hometown, Valença. At nineteen years old he became a cadet in Porto, and in 1791 he became an officer. The following year he was promoted to second lieutenant and assigned to the Companhia de Brulotes da Marinha.

José fought Moroccan buccaneers in the Strait of Gibraltar, when he belonged to the crew of the frigate Dom João, Príncipe do Brasil. Promoted to captain in 1797, he was placed again in the 21st Infantry Regiment. He directed the creation of fortifications in Minho and fought subsequently in the campaign of 1801, before resigning in 1807 at the onset of the French invasion, due to not wanting to serve in the French Army.

When the resistance against the French broke out, he had the rank of major. He took an active part in the fight, and was soon promoted to the rank of lieutenant colonel in 1808. In 1812, after a brilliant record of service in the military, he was appointed governor of the fortress of Valença, and later of Elvas. In 1815, he was promoted to major general (marechal de campo).
