= Theotonius of Coimbra =

12th-century Potuguese priest and saint

Saint Theotonius
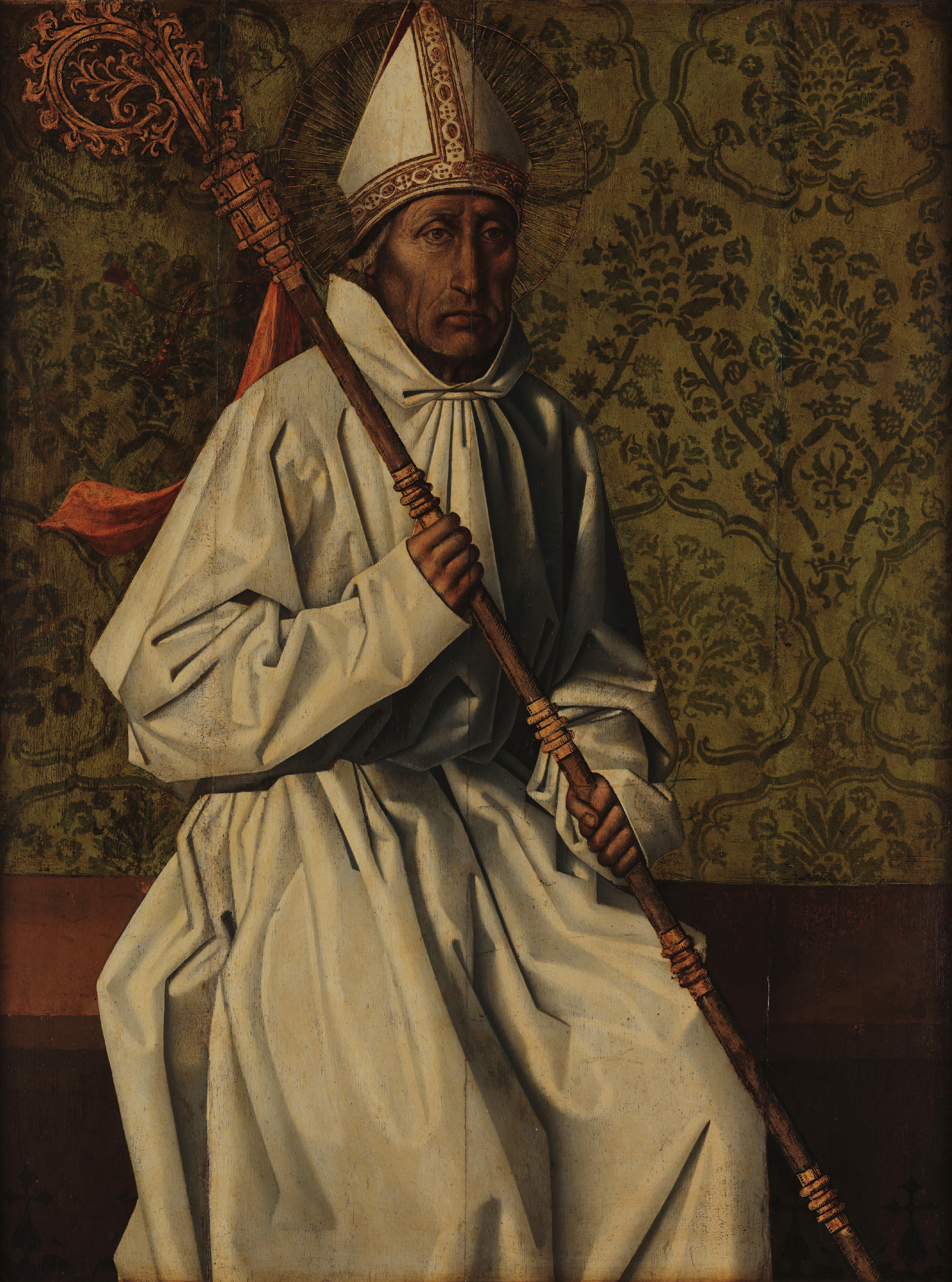
- Saint Theotonius (c. 1450-90), by Nuno Gonçalves, currently in the National Museum of Ancient Art, Lisbon, Portugal
- Born: c.1082 Ganfei, Valença, County of Portugal
- Died: 18 February 1162; Coimbra, Kingdom of Portugal
- Venerated in: Roman Catholic Church
- Canonized: Cultus confirmed by Pope Benedict XIV
- Feast: 18 February
- Patronage: Viseu, Portugal Valença, Portugal

Theotonius (c. 1082 - 1162) was a Canon Regular and royal advisor. He is noted in Portugal, for being the first prior of the Monastery of the Holy Cross in Coimbra, Portugal. He is celebrated as the reformer of religious life in Portugal, and is the first Portuguese saint.

== Early life ==
Theotonius was born in the village of Ganfei, in northern Portugal around 1082. His parents, Oveco (James) and Eugenia were both wealthy and pious. He was called "Theotonius", a Greek name meaning 'godly'. His uncle Dom Crescónio, abbot of the Benedictine monastery near Tuy, was his first teacher. When Dom Crescónio became bishop of Coimbra in 1092, he brought the ten-year-old Theotonius with him and entrusted his further education to the care of a young seminarian, Tello.

After the death of Bishop Crescónio in 1098, Theotonius went to Viseu, where his uncle named Teodorico was prior of the Cathedral Chapter of Santa Maria. During his time of preparation for the priesthood, Theotonius progressed through the minor ecclesiastic orders with great diligence and piety. The first of these was that of porter, with the responsibility to open the church and sacristy and ring the bell. After serving a period of time as a lector, he became an exorcist. One of the chief duties of exorcists was to take part in the baptismal exorcism of catechumens. Completing his term as an Acolyte, Theotonius was ordained a subdeacon. Holy Orders were conferred upon him sometime before the year 1109, by the bishop of Coimbra. The young priest was appointed a canon of the Cathedral Chapter of Viseu, which was a college of clerics who served as advisors to the bishop.

== Early religious life ==
After being ordained a priest, he remained at Viseu, where his service was so well-received that he soon was given the charge of the entire township as archpriest. He resigned so he could make a journey to the Holy Land, and upon his return, resumed ministering in Viseu. He was both an excellent speaker and an advocate for the poor. Deeply devoted to the holy souls in Purgatory, he would say Mass for them every Friday followed by a procession to the cemetery. Alms were collected as part of this weekly work of mercy and distributed to the poor. Theotonius was asked many times by Count Henry and Queen Teresa, to assume the office of bishop.

== Second pilgrimage to Jerusalem ==
Theotonius left his parish with a large number of pilgrims and set out once more to Jerusalem. After travelling for ten weeks, the group arrived at the port of Saint Nicholas, where they waited six weeks for favourable winds. As they were sailing by the Cape of Malea, they found themselves in a storm. Three weeks after leaving Bari, they arrived at the port of Joppa. The pilgrims started at the tomb of Saint George, in Lydda. From there they went to Nazareth, Mount Tabor, and Samaria, and saw the tomb of St. John the Baptist. Upon entering Jerusalem, Theotonius set himself first to see the Cross on Mount Calvary. He also visited the Mount of Olives and Bethany. Travelling to Bethlehem, the group continued on to Capharnaum, and the Sea of Galilee. There the pilgrimage ended, and Theotonius and the other pilgrims from his parish returned to Portugal.

Theotonius' experience in Holy Land resulted in both an increased devotion to the Passion and an intention to found a religious order following the Augustinian Rule.

== Foundation of the monastery of the Holy Cross ==
Theotonius helped to found the Canons Regular of the Holy Cross in Coimbra. Archdeacon Tello purchased the site of the monastery. The construction gained the backing of the Infante and Bernardo, Bishop of Coimbra. Work began on the Monastery of the Holy Cross and of the Blessed Mary Mother of God, on 28 June 1131. On 22 February 1132, the monastery was completed and the community took the habit and rule of Saint Augustine. It opened with 72 members, with Theotonius as prior.

== Counselor to the king ==
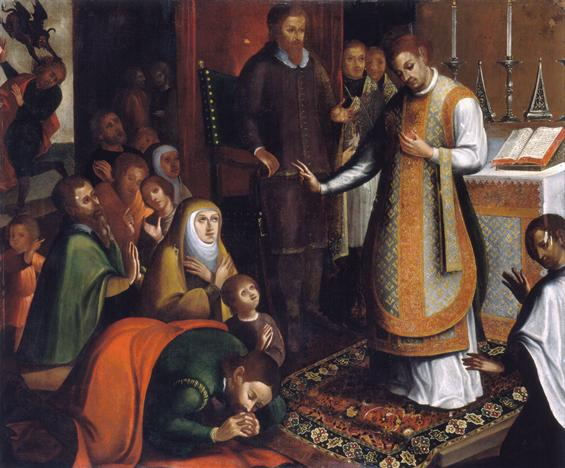
Saint Theotonius celebrates Mass before King Afonso I of Portugal.

Theotonius was a trusted advisor of Portugal's first king, Afonso Henriques (ruled 1139–85). The king attributed his success at the Battle of Ourique to the prayers of Theotonius, who was thus able to persuade the king to release Mozarabic Christians captured during forays into land held by the Moors.

Although his counsel was sought by Afonso Henriques, Theotonius did not hesitate to reprove the king or queen if he thought them in the wrong. One day, in the church of Viseu, he preached a sermon against co-habitation in the presence of the widowed queen and her lover, Count Fernando. On another occasion when the queen told him to shorten the Mass, he replied that the Mass was offered for a sovereign greater than she. Therefore, she could stay or go, but the length of the Mass would remain unchanged. He was offered the bishopric of Viseu and later Coimbra, but declined, partly because he suspected the queen was attempting to bribe him.

== Later years and death ==
Theotonius retired from his pastoral office of prior, after 30 years of service. He then became a hermit in solitude. He kept with him through his old age a shepherd's staff which St. Bernard, the first abbot of Clairvaux, had sent to him as a present when he heard of his sanctity. On Saturday, 18 February 1162, Theotonius died. The entire city of Coimbra showed their admiration for him. King Afonso I of Portugal was taken by such grief that he said of him, "His soul will be in Heaven before his body is in the tomb".

== Veneration ==
During his life, St. Theotonius was known for his humility and piety. His cultus was approved by Benedict XIV. His feast day is 18 February.

Portugal issued postal stamps with the image of St. Theotonius that circulated July 1958 to October 1961.

The Royal Confraternity of Saint Theotonius, founded on 2 November 2000, under the royal protection of Dom Miguel de Bragança, Duke of Viseu, Infante of Portugal, is a secular organization of the faithful with common ends, a group of men willingly desiring to defend the origins and Christian values, maintain and honor the spirit of and remember and promote devotion to Saint Theotonius.

== Bibliography ==
- A. Butler Butler's Lives of the Saints, Burns & Oates, 2000
