= São Pedro da Torre =

- Civil parish
- Location in Portugal
- Coordinates: 41.990°N 8.667°W
- Country: Portugal
- Region: Norte
- Intermunic. comm.: Alto Minho
- District: Viana do Castelo
- Municipality: Valença

Area
  - Total: 7.79 km^{2} (3.01 sq mi)

Population (2011)
  - Total: 1,267
  - Density: 160/km^{2} (420/sq mi)
- Time zone: UTC+00:00 (WET)
  - Summer (DST): UTC+01:00 (WEST)
- Website: www.jf-spedrodatorre.com

São Pedro da Torre (Portuguese pronunciation: [sɐ̃w ˈpeðɾu ðɐ ˈtoʁɨ]) is a Portuguese civil “parish” (freguesia), located in the municipality of Valença. The population in 2011 was 1,267, in an area of 7.79 km^{2}.

== History ==
Due to the privileged location on the left side of Minho River its lands have great agriculture value and that was one of the reasons for the origin of the settlement. The ancient Roman road per loca maritima, that came from Braga to Vigo, had its end in Portuguese territory there. This can be testified by the existence of two Roman bridges. Also the Roman milestone placed in Chamosinhos, dedicated to Constantine II has an added value to ensure this fact. The present existence of thermal fountain and that inscription suggests the way station Aquis Celenis mentioned in the Itinerary XXI of Antonine was placed in here. S. Pedro da Torre was founded in 1125 and later a strategic place during the restoration war against Castile. The Castilians built here a fortress in 1657, whose remains can still be observed. Several symbols of the resistance of the people of this parish can be found throughout. On 14 December 1900, the place of Chamosinhos, belonging to the parish of Vila Meã, was included in the parish of S. Pedro da Torre. Many of the inhabitants of this small village went to work abroad during the 1970s searching for a better life, mostly to United States, Canada and France. Many of them returned and built wealthy houses ("villas") that presently give the parish a new look.
