= Valença, Portugal =

Valença Valença do Minho
- Municipality
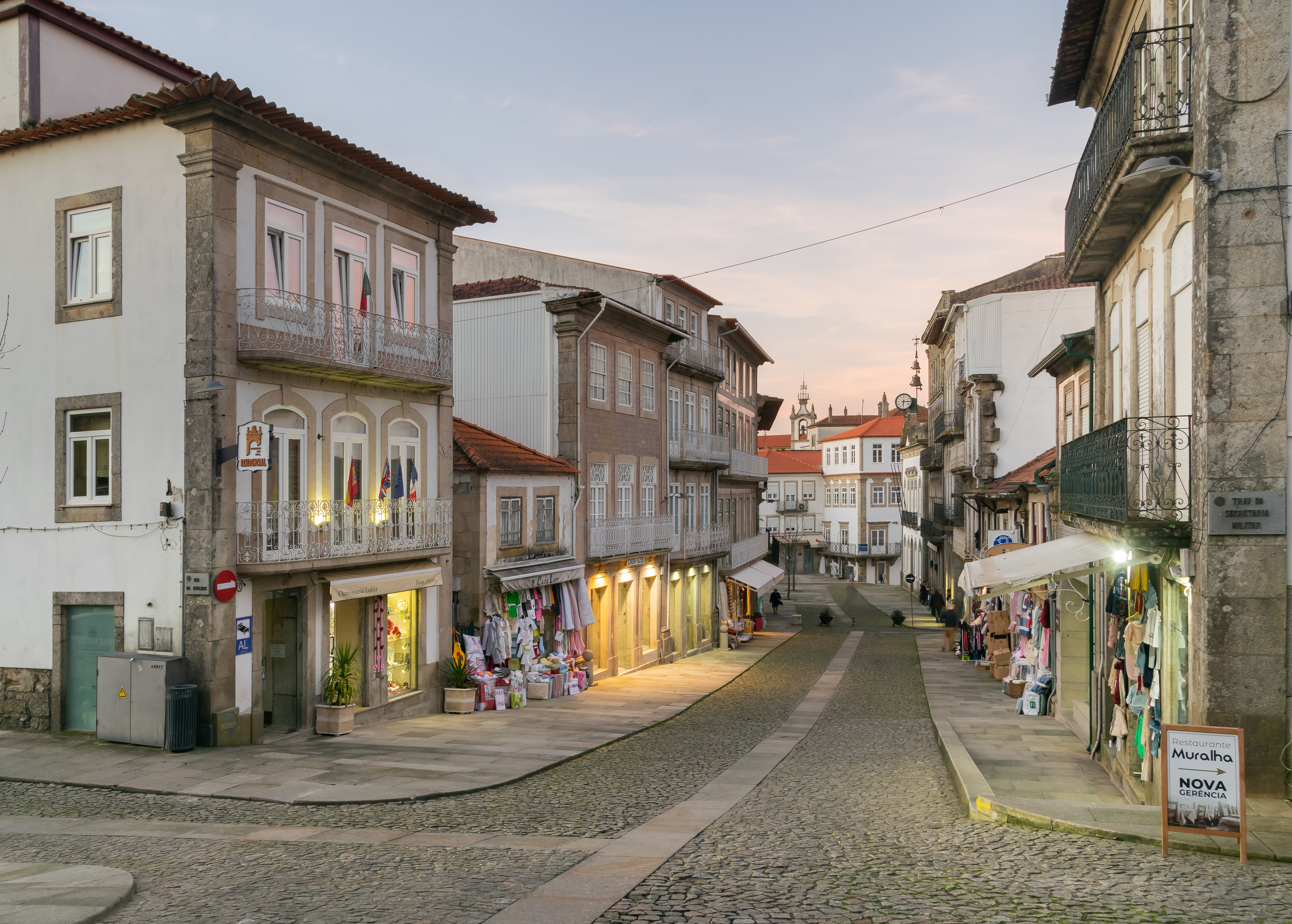
- Street in Valença

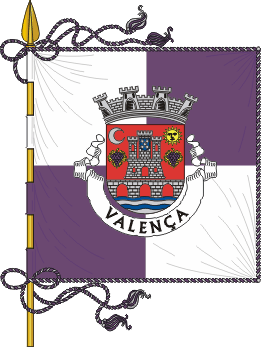
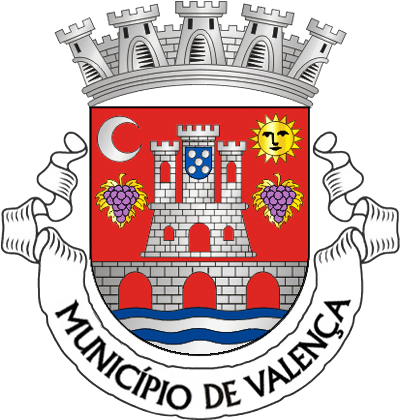
- Flag Coat of arms
- Interactive map of Valença
- Coordinates: 42°01′N 8°38′W
- Country: Portugal
- Region: Norte
- Intermunic. comm.: Alto Minho
- District: Viana do Castelo
- Parishes: 11

Government
  - President: José Manuel Carpinteira (PS)

Area
  - Total: 117.13 km^{2} (45.22 sq mi)

Population (2011)
  - Total: 14,127
  - Density: 120.61/km^{2} (312.38/sq mi)
- Time zone: UTC+00:00 (WET)
  - Summer (DST): UTC+01:00 (WEST)
- Website: http://www.cm-valenca.pt

Valença (Portuguese pronunciation: [vɐˈlẽsɐ]), also known as Valença do Minho (Traditional Spanish: Valencia de Miño), is a municipality and a town in Portugal, bordering Tui, Galicia. The population in 2011 was 14,127, in an area of 117.13 km^{2}.

Valença officially became a city on 12 June 2009. The municipality is located in Viana do Castelo District. The present Mayor is Jorge Mendes, elected by the Social Democratic Party (PSD). The municipal holiday is 18 February.

== Parishes ==
Administratively, the municipality is divided into 11 civil parishes (freguesias):

- Boivão
- Cerdal
- Fontoura
- Friestas
- Gandra e Taião
- Ganfei
- Gondomil e Sanfins
- São Julião e Silva
- São Pedro da Torre
- Valença, Cristelo Covo e Arão
- Verdoejo

== General information ==
Valença is a walled town located on the left bank of Minho River, approximately 25 km from the Atlantic Ocean. The municipality is bordered to the north by Minho River establishing the official border with Spain, to the south-southeast with the municipality of Paredes de Coura, to the southwest with Vila Nova de Cerveira and to the east with Monção. Linked to the wall rises the new quarter, where buildings such as social facilities, schools, the stadium and sports centre, the health care centre, the municipal market and the municipal swimming pools are located. Valença gastronomy offers genuine traditional delicacies such as Lampreia à Minhota (lamprey), Cabrito à Sanfins (goat), Bacalhau à São Teotónio (dried codfish) and Empanada (meat or fish pie).

== History ==
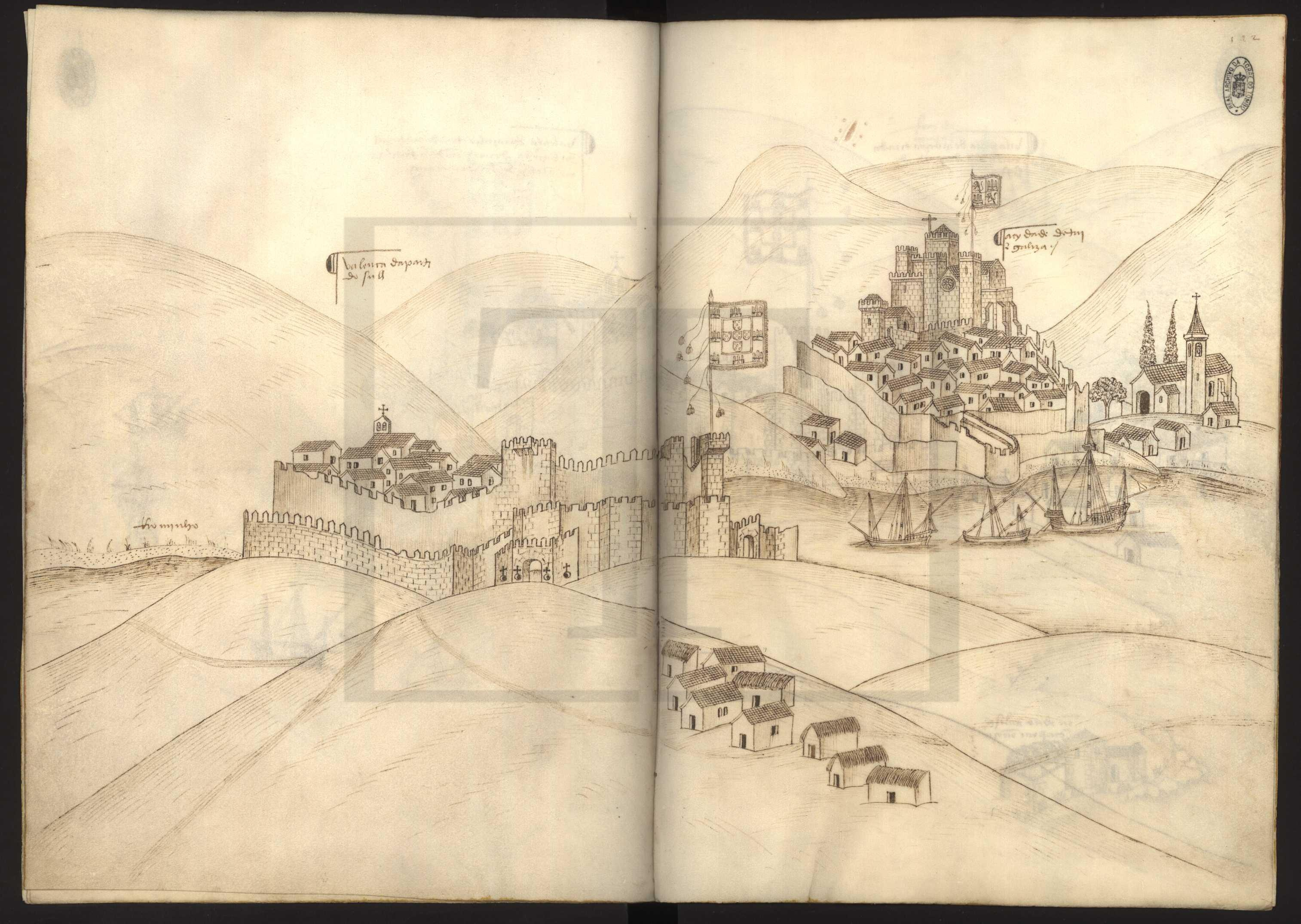
Valença and Tui in 1510 (Livro das Fortalezas)

Valença traces its origins to Roman times. The two existent Roman roads are its proof (the Antonine Via IV Itinerary XIX, for military use, and the designated per loca marítima - Itinerary XX -, for commercial use). Also inside the fortified walls a Roman milestone marks the XLII mile of the road connecting Braga to Tui. This stronghold was populated by order of King Sancho I during the 12th century. It was called Contrasta which means "village opposed to another", in this case Tui (Spain). King Afonso III changed its name to Valença in the 13th century. Its historical importance is mainly due to military reasons. It had a decisive role in the defence and integrity of the Kingdom of Portugal. Today the town is peacefully invaded by Spanish citizens that visit it for commercial and touristic purposes.

== Attractions ==
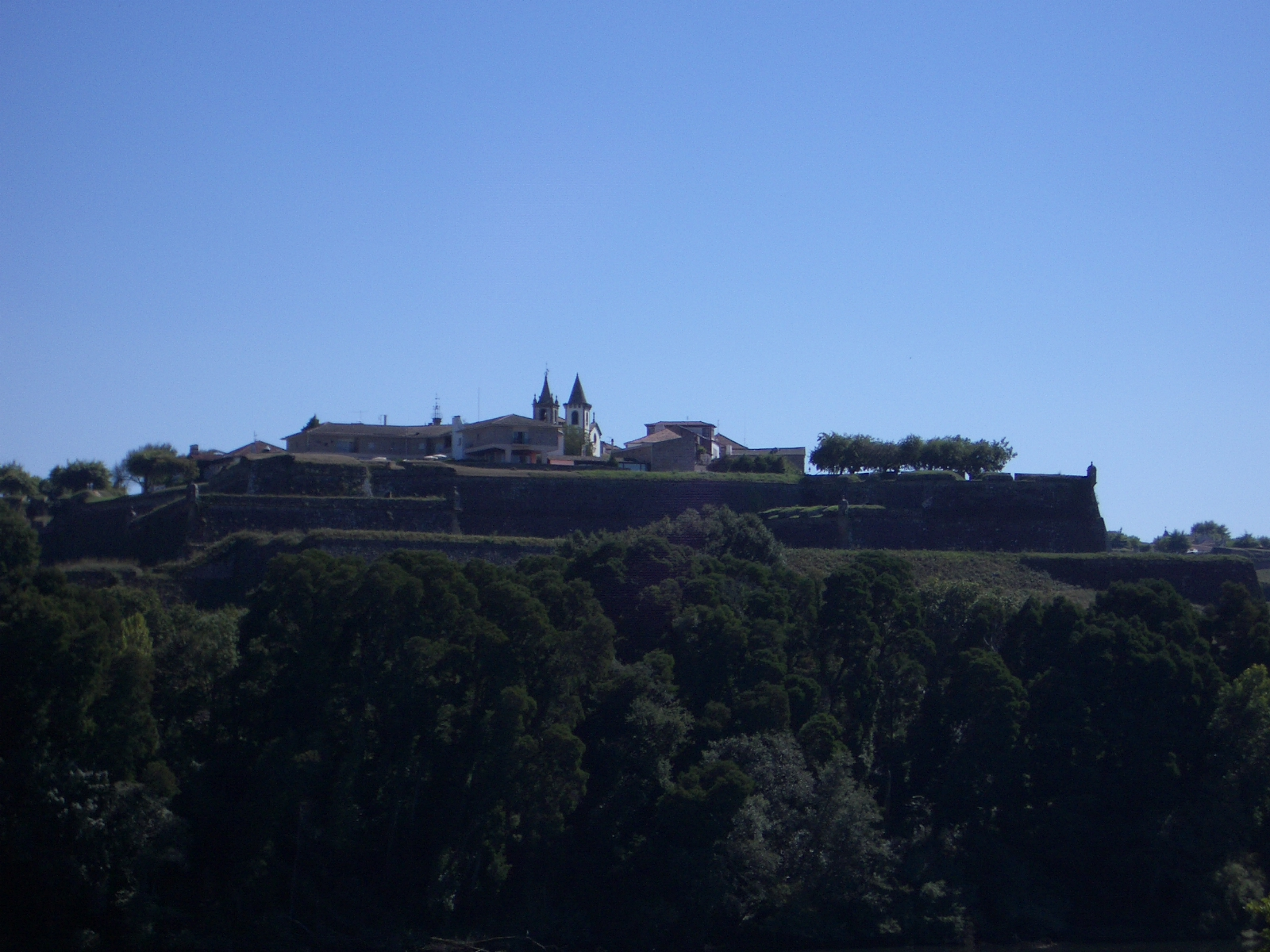
The fortress

- The fortress

The two main reasons to visit Valença are to visit the fortress and its urban-scape and the panoramic view overlooking the Minho River and Galicia. The structure has been damaged throughout the centuries by Barbarians (Kingdom of the Suebi and the Vandals), the Moors, the armies of Asturias and Leon and the Napoleonic armies in the 19th century; however the structure has always been restored and is well preserved.
Valença's fortress is a piece of Gothic and baroque military architecture. The first walls were built in the 13th century. It was upgraded during the 17th and 18th century forming the present bulwark system. It is placed on top of two small hills and it is formed by two polygons (the Recinto Magistral and the Coroada) separated by a ditch and with four gates (Coroada, Gaviarra, Fonte da Vila and Sol). The main entrance is Porta do Sol (Gate of the Sun). This gate was damaged during the Napoleonic invasions.

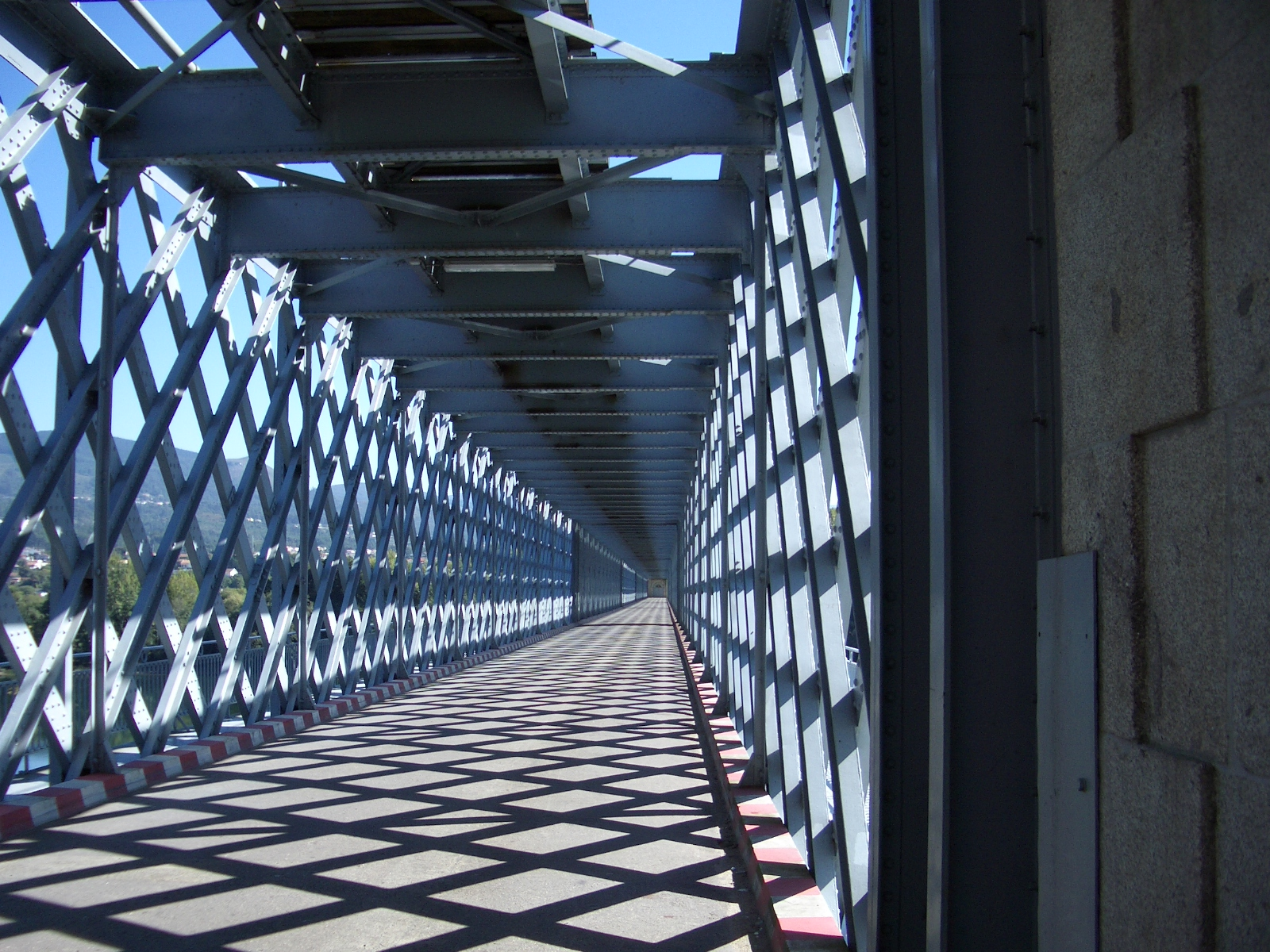
The old international bridge

- The old international bridge

In 1879 Portugal and Spain agreed to construct a bi-functional (road and train) bridge. The bridge was inspired in the works Gustave Eiffel. The bridge is still in use today, although a new bridge was built farther south.

- Roman milestone

Located inside the fortress this Roman milestone dates back from the 1st century AD. It has the following inscription:
TIBERIUS CLAUDIUS CAESER AUGUSTUS GERMANICUS PONTIFEX MAXIMUS. IMPERATOR V CONSUL III, TRIBUNICIA POTESTATE III. PATER PATRIAE BRACARA XLII.
It marks 42 Roman miles' (62 km) distance on the road from Braga to Tui and the Emperor Claudius ordered its construction when the Via IV of Antonine was rebuilt.

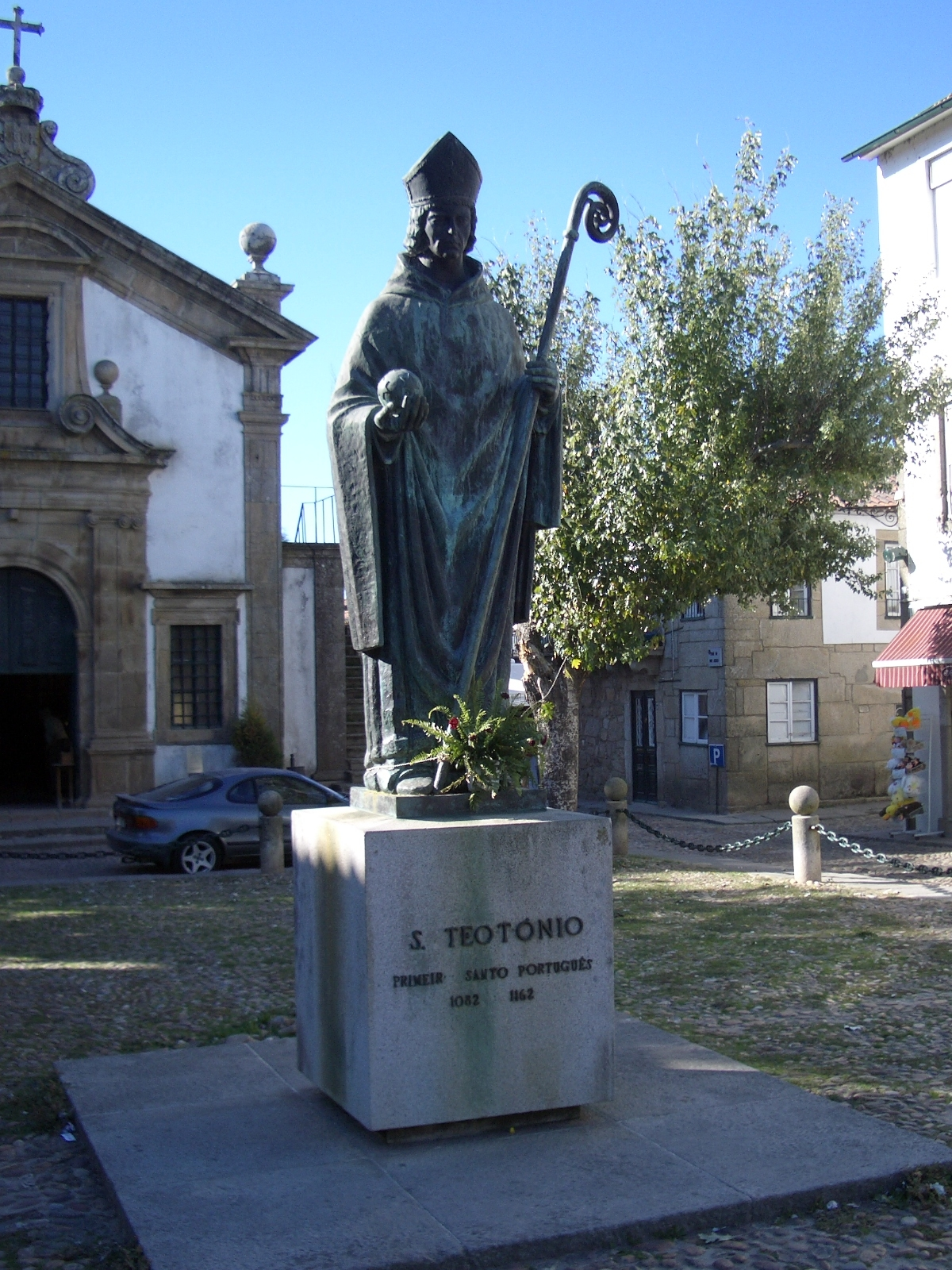
Statue of São Teotónio

- Church of Saint Stephen

A Romanesque church built during the 13th century and rebuilt in Neo-classic style in the 18th century. Inside several panels can be admired representing scenes of Saint Stephen’s life.

- Church of Saint Mary of the Angels

A Romanesque church built during the 12th century. The popular decoration and the ceiling are eye-catching.

- The cannons

Along the north wall, several very well maintained old artillery pieces are positioned pointing towards the river and Galicia, as if to remind us of their original purpose.

- Statue of São Teotónio

São Teotónio was the first Portuguese saint. Born near Valença, in Ganfei, he was the confessor of King Afonso Henriques. He is the village patron saint.

== Photo gallery ==
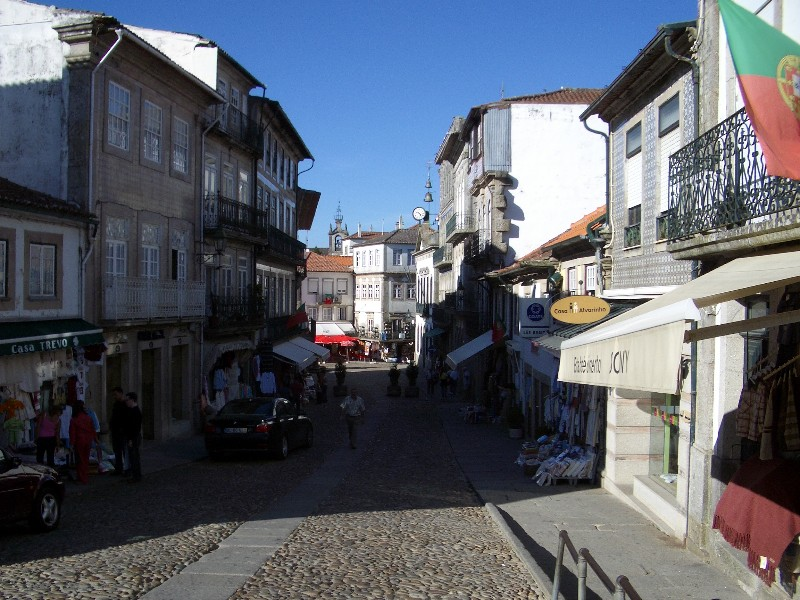
Inside the fortified walls

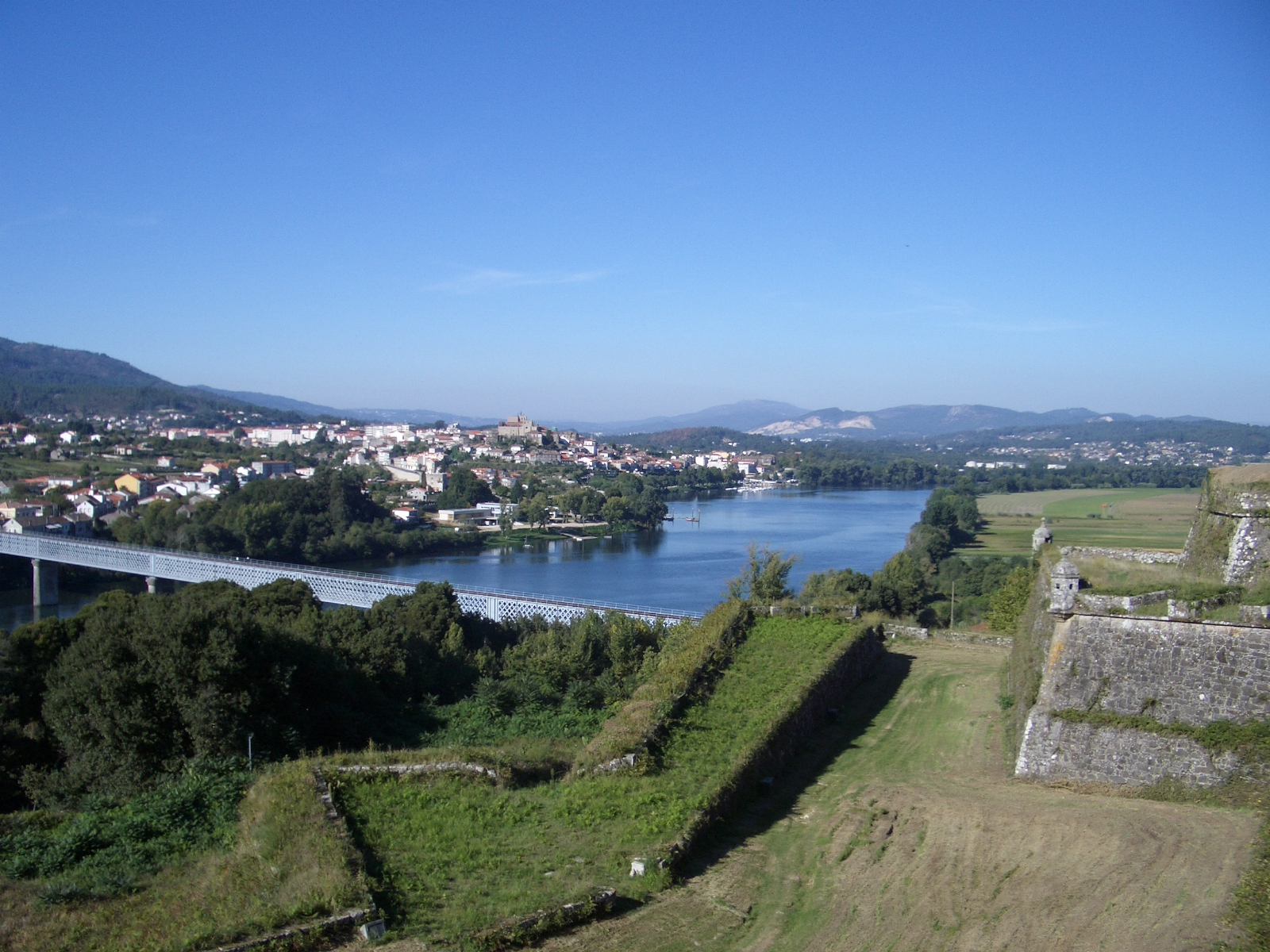
View over Minho River

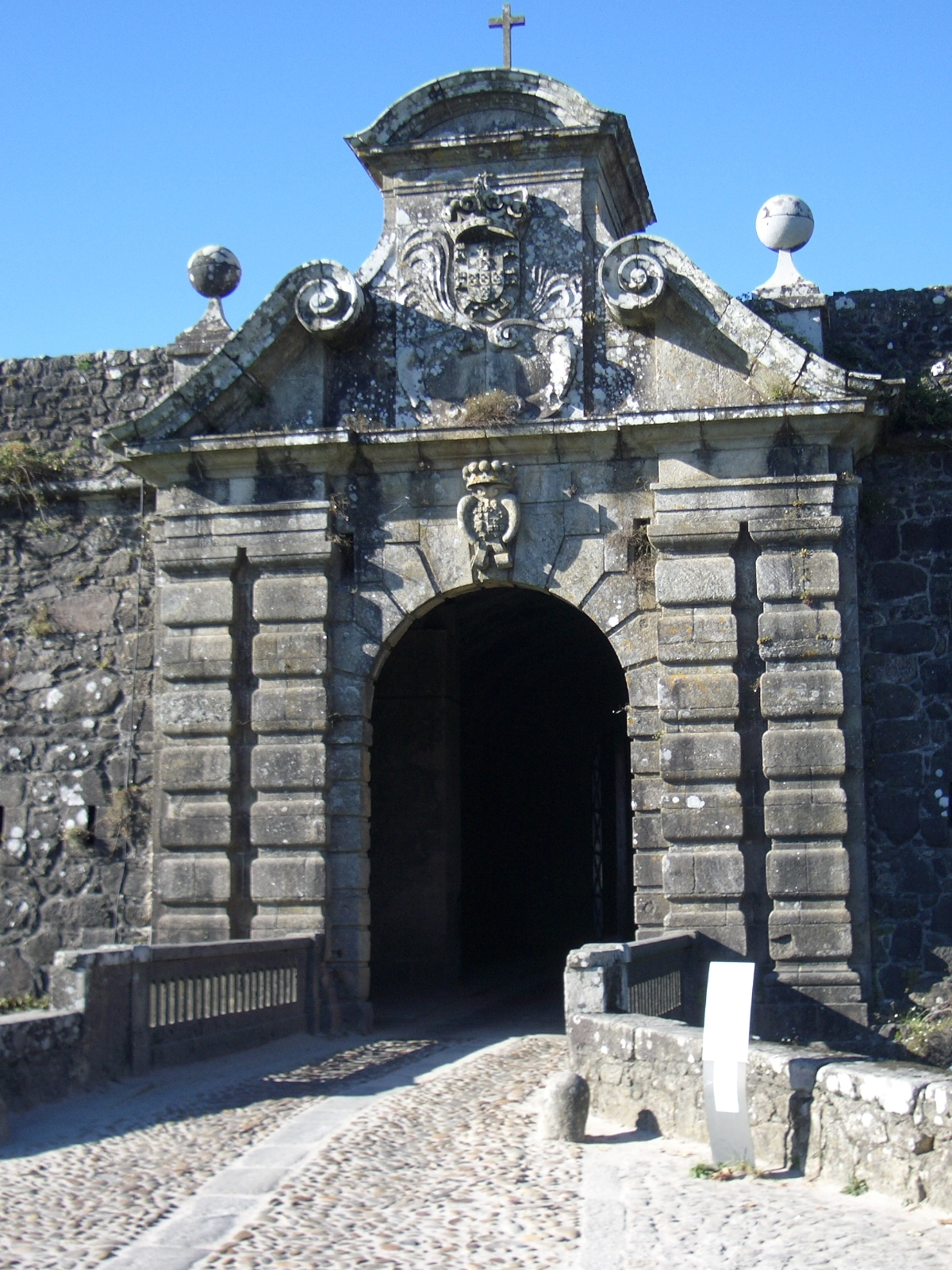
Gate entrance of the fortified walls

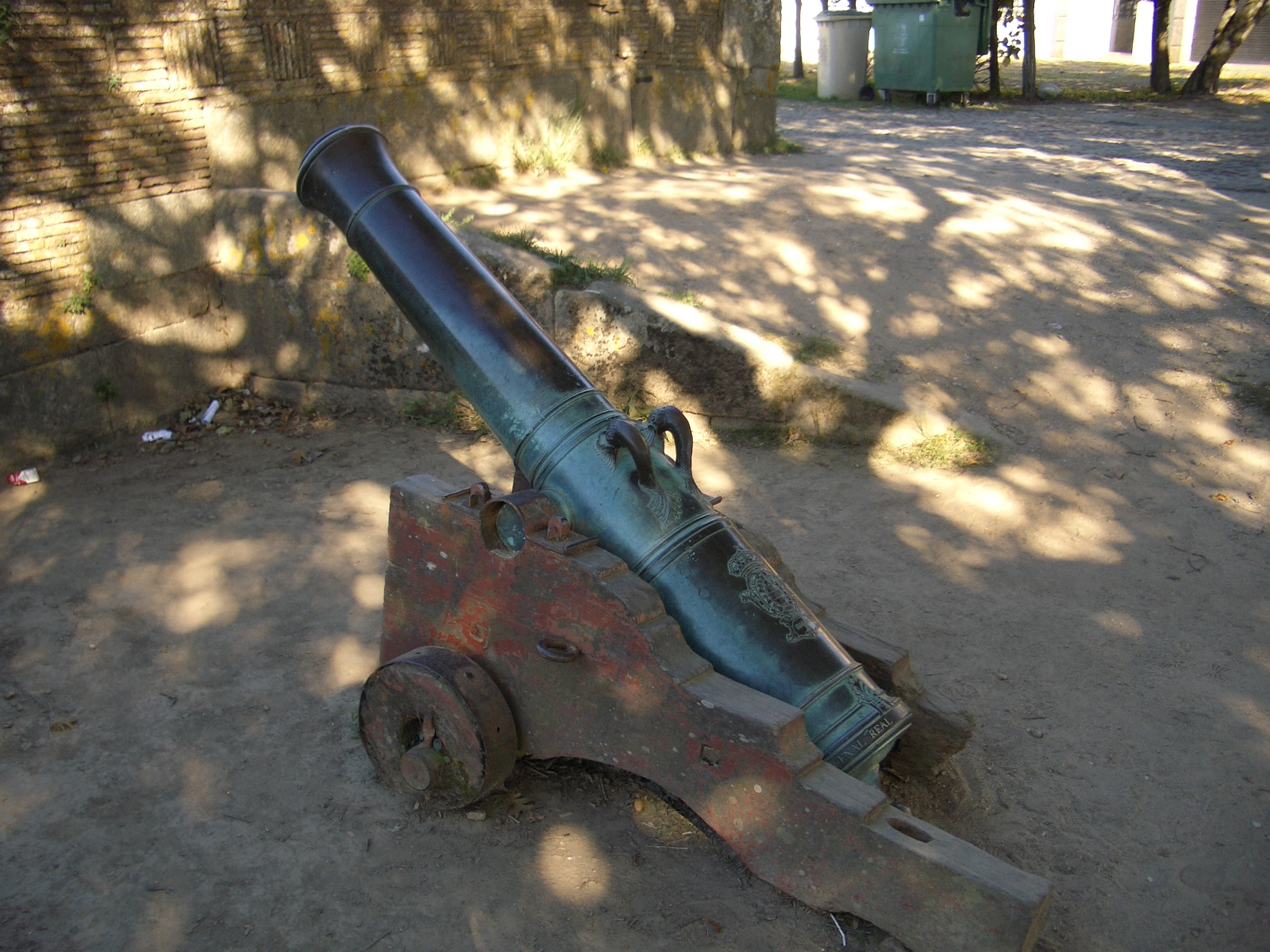
Cannon

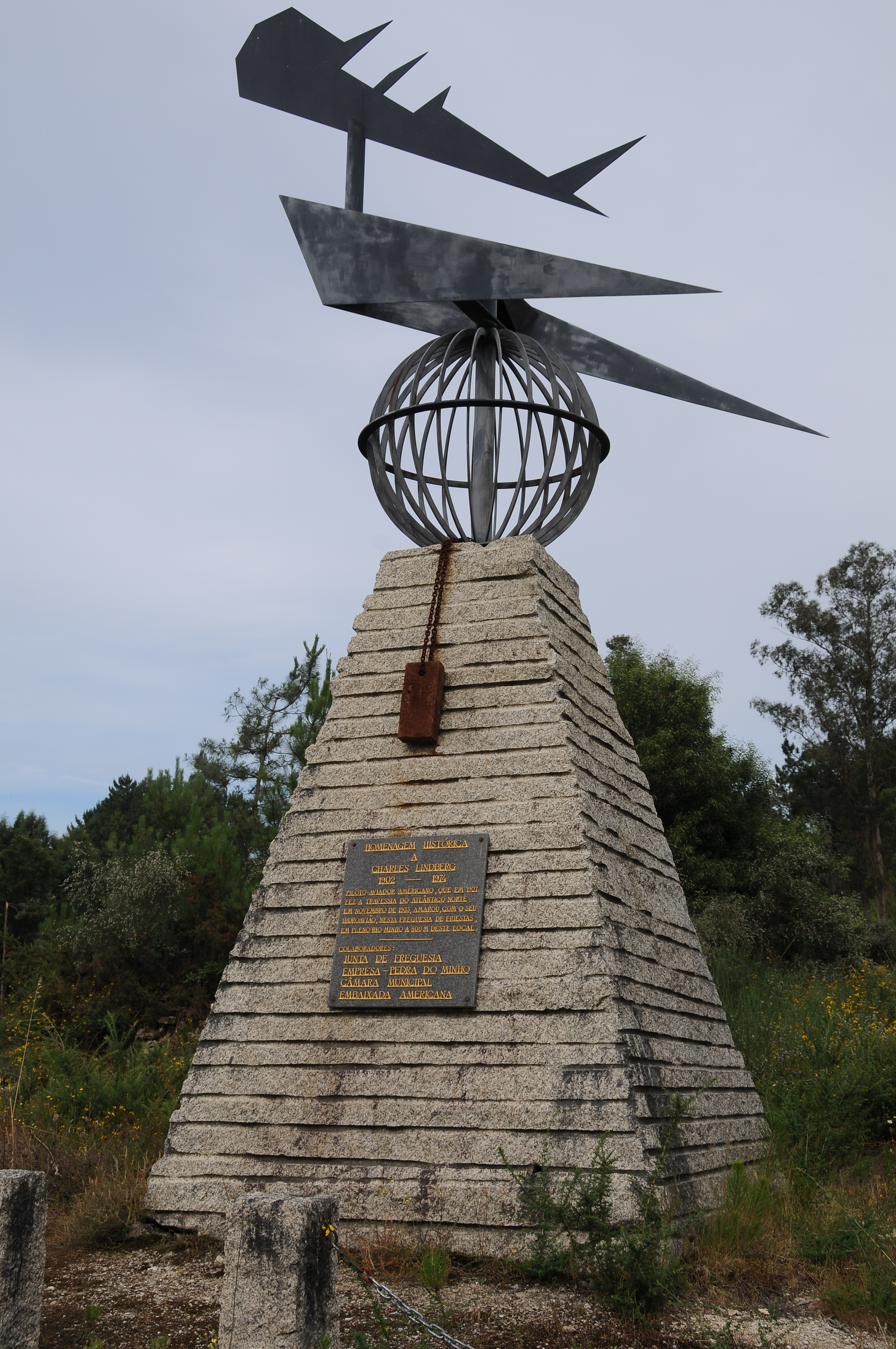
Monument of Charles Lindbergh in Friestas, Valença

== Notable people ==
- Theotonius of Coimbra (ca.1082 - 1162) (São Teotónio) a Canon Regular, royal adviser and the first Portuguese saint
- Francisco Xavier da Silva Pereira, 1st Count of Antas (1793–1852) a nobleman and a soldier during the Liberal Wars
- António Sampaio da Nóvoa (born 1954) an academic professor and unsuccessful independent candidate in the 2016 Portuguese presidential election
- Anabela Sousa Rodrigues (born 1972), Portuguese politician and psychologist
- Inês Fernandes (born 1988) a Portuguese Paralympic athlete
