= São Pedro (Porto de Mós) =

- Civil parish
- Interactive map of São Pedro
- Country: Portugal
- Region: Centro
- Intermunic. comm.: Região de Leiria
- District: Leiria
- Municipality: Porto de Mós
- Disbanded: 28 January 2013

Area
  - Total: 14.98 km^{2} (5.78 sq mi)

Population (2011)
  - Total: 2,879
  - Density: 192.2/km^{2} (497.8/sq mi)
- Time zone: UTC+00:00 (WET)
  - Summer (DST): UTC+01:00 (WEST)
- Patron: Saint Peter

São Pedro is a former civil parish in the municipality of Porto de Mós, Portugal. The population in 2011 was 2,879, in an area of 14.98 km^{2}. On 28 January 2013 it merged with São João Batista to form Porto de Mós. It is home to the Castelo de Porto de Mós.

Population of the civil parish of São Pedro (1864–2011)
Year	Pop.	±%
1864	1,754	—
1878	1,933	+10.2%
1890	2,051	+6.1%
1900	2,365	+15.3%
1911	2,376	+0.5%
1920	2,474	+4.1%
1930	1,836	−25.8%
1940	2,046	+11.4%
1950	2,313	+13.0%
1960	2,462	+6.4%
1970	2,232	−9.3%
1981	2,402	+7.6%
1991	2,582	+7.5%
2001	2,869	+11.1%
2011	2,879	+0.3%
