= António de Faria =

Portuguese explorer

- Born: Figueira da Foz
- Died: 10 June 1548
- Occupations: Explorer, privateer

António de Faria was a 16th-century Portuguese explorer and privateer. He was the first European to encounter the Mekong River of Southeast Asia in 1540. He anchored in Da Nang in 1535 and later tried to establish a major trading centre at the port village of Fai-Fo (current day Hội An, Vietnam).

== Biography ==
Born in Campo de Coimbra, Alqueidão marshland, in Figueira da Foz, near Montemor-o-Velho.

Leaving for India, he went to seek his fortune in the Far East, exploring above all the coasts of China, more as a pirate than as an explorer, a privateer of the eastern seas, gaining a reputation as fearsome and terrible. He roamed Malacca as a ship's captain.

In 1535, Captain António de Faria was the first European (Portuguese) who, departing from Da Nang (later known as Tourane), where the Portuguese had landed in 1516, in what was then called Cochinchina (now Vietnam), established, or tried to establish, a trading post in the coastal city of Faifo, about 20 kilometers from present-day Da Nang. It was hoped that António de Faria would be able to create a permanent Portuguese enclave such as those at Macau and Goa; however, this attempt failed, as the trading post never flourished. He was also responsible for a misunderstanding of the name for Vietnam, calling the region "Cauchi", a name derived from the Chinese characters for Vietnam: Giao Chi. To avoid confusion with his colony of Cochin (Kochi), in India, he added 'China' to the region's name. Thus, the name Cochinchina was born. Later, the French would also use that name, just for the southern part of Vietnam.

It was in 1537, in Patane, that António de Faria met Fernão Mendes Pinto, Captain of another Embassy of his fifth cousin Pero de Faria to the King of Patane, like himself. However, António de Faria brought some clothes from India that no one bought there, so he decided to go to the Kingdom of Siam (currently Thailand) to exchange them for gold and stones from the island of Calimantan (currently Borneo). Fernão Mendes Pinto went with him. António de Faria accompanied him on his travels and explorations during much of his journey through the East and was one of his companions, being also a native of Montemor-o-Velho and being mentioned by him in his book Peregrinação (Pilgrimage), between Chapters XXXV and LXIX, where he became one of the leading characters, as well as in the film Peregrinação. Allied with Chinese pirates, fighting others, he roamed the seas of China.

Fernão Mendes Pinto and António de Faria, in one situation, wanted to know news from Liampó, "because at that time there was an armada of four hundred junks in which one hundred thousand men went by order of the King of China to arrest the men of ours who used to go there, to burn their ships and villages, because he didn't want them in their land, because he was informed again that they were not as faithful and peaceful people as they had been told before.". But that presumption was mistaken, as this fleet had, after all, gone to the aid of a Sultan in the Gotō islands.

Another time, after an attack that António de Faria repelled, six corsairs were left alive, to be put "to torment" later. The prisoners, tied up in the basement, chose to bite their throats.

His adventure path is marked by the pursuit of the pirate and Moorish privateer Coja Acem or Hoja Asan, the "dog of Coja Acem", self-titled "spiller and drinker of Portuguese blood" to whom de Faria had sworn revenge for having stolen his farms. "And, with this fervor and zeal of faith, attacking Coja Acem as one who had good will, he gave him, with a sword that he had, in both hands, such a great gash on the head that, cutting the hat he was wearing, knocked him to the ground. And turning to him with another setback, cut off both his legs so that he could no longer stand up."

In 1540, on board the ships captained by António de Faria, they passed an island "at the height of 8º and 1/3 of the North part, and almost Northwest / Southeast with the coast of Cambodia, "distant from land about 6 leagues, were upriver, they stole a few ships, "so it was necessary to leave there immediately [...] and leave in a great hurry".

In another river, they robbed again, and stole a fortune in goods so large that they needed to sell it quickly, given the excess weight that the boats carried. They were, however, attacked on the way, but the assailants overcame and, in the process, became even more full of goods, and richer, because "it pleased Our Lord that the enemies were thrown into the sea, most of whom were drowned and the reeds were in our power."

The difficulty now was to sell all this loot, because who they had stolen and killed, as they later learned, was a privateer who had a partnership with the Governor of that Province, and to whom he gave a third of all the plunder he took, at least who were warned of the dangers of trading there, since the news of what they had done was already known.

Then they went further north, always along the Cambodian coast.

They fled once more and, now on Hainan Island, already in China, they found a way to trade without disembarking, fearful that the news of their deeds had already arrived there, officially justifying themselves with not wanting to pay customs duties. Thus, those interested in the purchase came to the sea with them.

"With great haste to unload the farm, in just three days it was weighed and bagged, and delivered to its owners, with the accounts verified and the silver received [...] and although this was done as soon as possible, not even that was enough for before it was over, the news of what we had done stopped coming [...] that the whole earth mutinied, so that no one else wanted us to come aboard [...] for what it was forced António de Faria to set sail and very quickly".

They robbed a few more boats, "where they took some good prey, and, from what we took care of, well acquired, because he (de Faria) never intended to steal anything but the cossairos who had killed and robbed the farms of many Christians who frequented this cove and coast of Ainão (Hainan), who cossairos had their dealings with the mandarins of these ports". "And at this honored feat, the Chinese were so astonished [...] that the Viceroy (Dom Garcia de Noronha) himself sent to visit him (de Faria) with a rich gift of pearls and gold pieces [...] asking you to serve him as his captain-major from the coast of Lamau (in Calimantã) to Liampó ", that is, from Indonesia to the Chinese city of Ningbo, that is, the Kingdom of Piracy, which was refused, as António de Faria preferred to act freely, without having to give percentages to the Viceroy.

Leaving the port of Rio Madel, and despite the crew being willing to see the loot shared among themselves, which they already considered sufficient, and return to their homes, António de Faria was still not satisfied. In the continuation of the voyage, they ended up shipwrecked, lost everything at sea and arrived, naked and barefoot, at the Ilha dos Piratas (Island of Pirates).

Eventually, a boat arrived at Ilha dos Piratas, which they robbed, and thus they were able to leave the Island, with the aim of going to "Liampó, which was a port further on from there, to the North, two hundred and sixty leagues, because it could be that along the coast we would improve ourselves from another vessel larger and more accommodated for our purpose".

Indeed, in Xamoy, they found a vessel, which they robbed, but it only served to replace their own vessel, since, as the cargo was only rice, they threw most of it overboard.

Further up, they crossed paths with a vessel belonging to another privateer, Quiay Panjão, to whom they decided to join. And, knowing through him news of the whereabouts of the pirate who had defeated him, António de Faria went in search of the vessels where he was. He defeated him, and "ourselves then encouraged by the name of Christ our Lord, whom they called continually, and with the victory they already knew, and with much honor they had gained, they ended up killing them there."

At latitude 26° they sank again, and again lost everything at sea. They were close to the city of Nouday, where some Portuguese were imprisoned, so they went there. After fighting and releasing the Portuguese, "the soldiers and other people of our company were ordered to take what they could [...] but begged them to go very quickly", having embarked "all very rich and very happy, and with many very beautiful girls".

The next day, they went to a village, "on the other side of the water's edge, and found it emptied of everyone [...] but the houses with all the stuffing of their farms and infinite supplies, of which António de Faria ordered to load". So that the inhabitants would forget their deeds, they went to "winter the 3 months to an island [...] in the sea of Liampó fifteen leagues", without, however, before that, having fought and won in that combat so much more silver from Japan.

In Liampó (present day Ningbo), where more than a thousand Portuguese lived, they were received with all the pomp and circumstance, heard a sung Mass, "in which an Estêvão Nogueira, who was vicar, preached", a banquet was offered to them and a re-enactment of the episode was performed in which his fifth grandfather, a direct male ascendant, became famous, the famous Mayor (-Mor do Castelo) of Faria, Nuno Gonçalves de Faria. They stayed there for about five months, during the monsoon period, and there they learned that, on a coastal river island called Calempluy or Calemplui, there were seventeen deposits where were the tombs of the Kings of China, in fact, of seventeen Chinese Emperors, and the royal treasures of China, with immense riches, that he sought.

In 1542, on the way to Calemplui, "56 Portuguese and a priest and 48 sailors were going", the pilot being the privateer Similao or Similau, who, being from that region, would know which route to take. Tradition has it that, thanks to the pilot, he found these tombs and robbed them, about which there is great doubt, as it seems that they only existed in the credulous imagination of some Chinese.

From Liampó to the Gulf of Nanjing, they ended up reaching "a bay at a height of 40º, whose climate we find a little colder". They did so on the advice of Similau, so as not to enter directly through the Nanking inlet, which is just over 30º, which would be dangerous, and thus they would go by another river, which would also take them there. From this passage he tells of new species of fish, of several mountains that they crossed, of wild men, inhabitants of the Serra de Gangitanou, "who are very rustic and wild people and the most out of all reason of how much they have been discovered until now".

There they continued up the river, until they reached the cove of Nanquim, two and a half months after leaving Liampó. From there they reached the island of Calemplui, situated in the middle of the river. "It was this island, all enclosed in a circle, with an embankment of jasper ashlar, twenty-six palms high, made of slabs so raw and well laid that the whole wall seemed to be a single piece".

Entering the island, walking towards what he calls Ermida, they entered "and found inside it an old man, apparently over a hundred years old, wearing a very long purple damask robe, which in his appearance seemed to be a noble man. ". Hiticou, that's what the Monk was called, witnessed the "turmoil and rumor that we all made in disarming and unpacking coffins" full of silver, and António de Faria told him "not to be scandalized, because he was assured that the great poverty in which he saw himself had made him do what he in fact it was not of his condition and that after he had spoken with the monk, regretting what he had done, he had wanted to return immediately, but that those men were at hand [...]". Some of the men said it was better to kill the Monk, but António de Faria did not want to do it, thinking that, given the monk's age and the scare he had been taken, he would surely do nothing, and the next day, they would loot the other Chapels of the Kings ' Tombs. But the Monk gave the warning to all the others, as they saw it themselves, because, "one hour past midnight, we saw on top of the fence of the great pagoda of the tomb of the kings a very long course of fireworks."

As a man out of his mind, António de Faria, "going aimlessly over the bars [...] ran like a madman [...] and went to a chapel much nobler and richer than the other, in which were two men [...] dressed in religious attire [...] and took them both [...] while they took from the altar a good-sized silver idol, with a golden miter on his head and a wheel in his hand [...] plus three silver lamps with their very long chains ". From these Monks he had the sure news that the alarm had been given, so it would not be possible to fulfill what they wanted, that is, to loot the seventeen Tombs of the Kings.

In these terms, they returned to the boat, and along the way, António de Faria was "plucking his beard and slapping himself many times for having lost, through his carelessness and ignorance, such a thing".

In that same year, 1542, China organized an offensive against the Portuguese to avenge certain offenses, namely the violation of the royal graves of Campeluy, carried out by António de Faria and his companions, completely destroying the Feitoria of Liampó.

As recounted in Chapter LXXIX of the Peregrinação, after the violation of the "hermitages", they suffered a new shipwreck in the Nanking cove. António de Faria ends up disappearing, enigmatically, by the action of natural forces. On Monday the 5th of August 1542, the boat in which he was returning from this expedition was caught by a storm, a typhoon in the lowlands of Liampó, and sank, saving himself. According to an account given by the famous adventurer Fernão Mendes Pinto, only fourteen of de Faria's crew also survived, among them the brothers Belchior and Gaspar Barbosa and their cousin, Francisco Borges Carneiro, all born in Ponte de Lima, and these ended up being welcomed into a kind of Misericórdia in Sileyjacau, where they died.

António de Faria survived the aforementioned shipwreck, and died in Goa of an illness on June 2, 1548. He was absolved by Father Mestre Francisco. He left a will, in which he donated some personal donations, freed some of his oriental slaves including a female slave and her daughter (possibly his own illegitimate child), paid his debts, asked King Dom João III of Portugal to remunerate him for services rendered and for two boats which he had had arrested in Lisbon, and left all of his few remaining assets to the Santa Casa da Misericórdia of Goa. These included oriental slaves, some fugitives, some marshland he had inherited, and various objects including two Japanese swords, and the proceeds of the sale of some goods.
