= São João Batista (Porto de Mós) =

- Civil parish
- Interactive map of São João Batista
- Country: Portugal
- Region: Centro
- Intermunic. comm.: Região de Leiria
- District: Leiria
- Municipality: Porto de Mós
- Disbanded: 28 January 2013

Area
  - Total: 16.18 km^{2} (6.25 sq mi)

Population (2011)
  - Total: 3,144
  - Density: 194.3/km^{2} (503.3/sq mi)
- Time zone: UTC+00:00 (WET)
  - Summer (DST): UTC+01:00 (WEST)
- Patron: John the Baptist

São João Batista is a former civil parish in the municipality of Porto de Mós, Portugal. The population in 2011 was 3,144, in an area of 16.18 km^{2}. On 28 January 2013 it merged with São Pedro to form Porto de Mós.

Population of the civil parish of São João Batista (1864–2011)
Year	Pop.	±%
1864	1,543	—
1878	1,661	+7.6%
1890	1,907	+14.8%
1900	2,047	+7.3%
1911	2,509	+22.6%
1920	2,286	−8.9%
1930	1,566	−31.5%
1940	1,808	+15.5%
1950	2,089	+15.5%
1960	1,628	−22.1%
1970	1,711	+5.1%
1981	1,534	−10.3%
1991	2,597	+69.3%
2001	2,919	+12.4%
2011	3,144	+7.7%
