= Bruninho =

Bruninho is a Portuguese name that is a diminutive form of the male name Bruno. It may refer to the following people:

- Bruninho (footballer, born 1986), Bruno Filipe Raposo Fernandes, Portuguese football winger
- Bruninho (footballer, born 1988), Bruno Filipe Lopes Correia, Portuguese football winger
- Bruninho (footballer, born 1989), Bruno Anderson da Silva Sabino, Brazilian football winger
- Bruninho (footballer, born 1992), Bruno Felipe Lima Teixeira, Brazilian football midfielder for Al-Hussein
- Bruninho (footballer, born 1993), Bruno Felipe de Abreu Barbos, Brazilian football left-back for Jataiense
- Bruninho (futsal player) (born 1997), Bruno de Castro Iacovino, Brazilian futsal winger for Dinamo-Samara
- Bruninho (footballer, born 2000), Bruno Roberto Pereira da Silva, Brazilian football midfielder for Karpaty Lviv
- Bruninho (footballer, born 2005), Bruno César Pereira Silva, Brazilian football midfielder for Fortaleza
- Bruninho (footballer, born 2008), Bruno Braga Ramos, Brazilian football midfielder for Athletico Paranaense

== See also ==
- Bruninho Samudio (born 2010), Brazilian professional goalkeeper
