= Bruninho (footballer, born 1986) =

Portuguese footballer

Personal information
- Full name: Bruno Filipe Raposo Fernandes
- Date of birth: 11 January 1986 (age 40)
- Place of birth: Mira de Aire, Portugal
- Height: 1.70 m (5 ft 7 in)
- Position: Winger

Youth career
- 1995−1996: Mirense
- 1996−2005: Sporting CP

Senior career*
Years	Team	Apps	(Gls)
2005–2006	Sporting CP	0	(0)
2005–2006	→ Casa Pia (loan)	22	(1)
2006–2007	Aves	0	(0)
2007	→ Fafe (loan)	7	(1)
2007–2009	Lousada	66	(4)
2009–2011	Portimonense	6	(0)
2010–2011	→ Louletano (loan)	10	(0)
2011	Tirsense	8	(0)
2012	Monsanto	16	(4)
2012–2017	Lusitanos	60	(37)
2015–2016	→ Sant Julià (loan)	20	(6)
2017–2018	Engordany	5	(2)
2018–2021	Inter d'Escaldes	38	(2)
2021–2022	Engordany	8	(0)
2022–2023	Lixa	17	(0)
Total		283	(57)

International career
2001–2002	Portugal U16	10	(0)
2002–2003	Portugal U17	8	(0)
- * Club domestic league appearances and goals

Bruno Filipe Raposo Fernandes (born 11 January 1986 in Mira de Aire, Leiria District), known as Bruninho, is a Portuguese former professional footballer who played as a winger.
