= Calvaria de Cima =

- Civil parish
- Location in Portugal
- Coordinates: 39°38′24″N 8°52′1″W
- Country: Portugal
- Region: Centro
- Intermunic. comm.: Região de Leiria
- District: Leiria
- Municipality: Porto de Mós
- Established: 10 December 1924

Area
  - Total: 10.11 km^{2} (3.90 sq mi)

Population (2021)
  - Total: 2,477
  - Density: 250/km^{2} (630/sq mi)
- Time zone: UTC+00:00 (WET)
  - Summer (DST): UTC+01:00 (WEST)

Calvaria de Cima is a civil parish in the municipality of Porto de Mós, Portugal. The population in 2021 was 2,477, in an area of 10.11 km^{2}.
