= Porto de Mós (freguesia) =

- Civil parish
- Location in Portugal
- Coordinates: 39°36′7″N 8°49′57″W
- Country: Portugal
- Region: Centro
- Intermunic. comm.: Região de Leiria
- District: Leiria
- Municipality: Porto de Mós
- Established: 28 January 2013

Area
  - Total: 28.19 km^{2} (10.88 sq mi)

Population (2021)
  - Total: 6,001
  - Density: 210/km^{2} (550/sq mi)
- Time zone: UTC+00:00 (WET)
  - Summer (DST): UTC+01:00 (WEST)
- Patron: John the Baptist and Saint Peter

Porto de Mós (officially Porto de Mós - São João Batista e São Pedro) is a civil parish in the municipality of Porto de Mós, Portugal. The population in 2021 was 6,001, in an area of 28.19 km^{2}. It was formed on 28 January 2013 by the merging of freguesias São João Batista and São Pedro.
