= Ruth Garcês =

Portuguese judge (1934–2006)

- Born: 1934; Portuguese Mozambique
- Died: 10 June 2006 (aged 71–72); Porto de Mós, Portugal
- Occupation: Judge
- Known for: First female judge in Portugal

Ruth Garcês (1934–2006) was a Portuguese lawyer, magistrate and judge. She was the first woman to serve as both a magistrate and a judge in Portugal. She also founded the Portuguese Association of Women Judges.

Born in Lourenço Marques in Mozambique in 1934, Garcês (also written as Garcez and Garcêz) graduated in Law from the University of Coimbra in 1956. After completing her studies, she returned to Mozambique, practicing there for two decades. After the Independence of Mozambique in 1975 she settled permanently in Portugal and, in 1977, began to work as a magistrate after a competitive exam that, prior to the Carnation Revolution in 1974, had only been open to men. In 1993, she was made a judge at the Lisbon Court of Appeal.

A Fado singer in her spare time, Garcês retired from the judiciary in 2005 after reaching the age limit of seventy. A year before her retirement she had competed for a position on the Portuguese Supreme Court (Portuguese: Supremo Tribunal de Justiça). She attributed her failure to gain a seat to the practice of giving preference to “judges who served political power”. That year, she published the book Eu Juiz Me Confesso, which developed this theme of the relationship between politics and justice. In 2005 she was awarded the Order of Liberty (Portuguese: Ordem da Liberdade) by the President of the Republic, Jorge Sampaio. She died on 10 June 2006 at her home in Porto de Mós.
