= Alqueidão da Serra =

- Civil parish
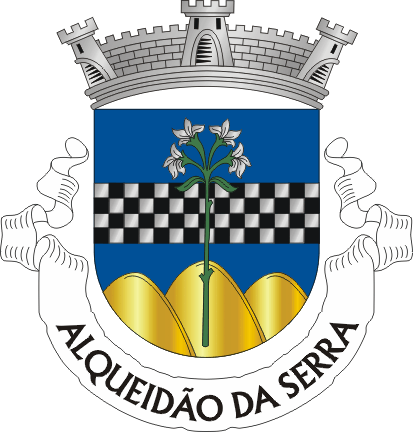
- Coat of arms

- Location in Portugal
- Coordinates: 39°37′4″N 8°46′55″W
- Country: Portugal
- Region: Centro
- Intermunic. comm.: Região de Leiria
- District: Leiria
- Municipality: Porto de Mós

Area
  - Total: 21.27 km^{2} (8.21 sq mi)

Population (2021)
  - Total: 1,549
  - Density: 73/km^{2} (190/sq mi)
- Time zone: UTC+00:00 (WET)
  - Summer (DST): UTC+01:00 (WEST)
- Patron: Saint Joseph

Alqueidão da Serra is a civil parish in the municipality of Porto de Mós, Portugal. The population in 2021 was 1,549, in an area of 21.27 km^{2}.

It features a 100m long Roman road which was built between the 1st century BC and the 1st century AD.

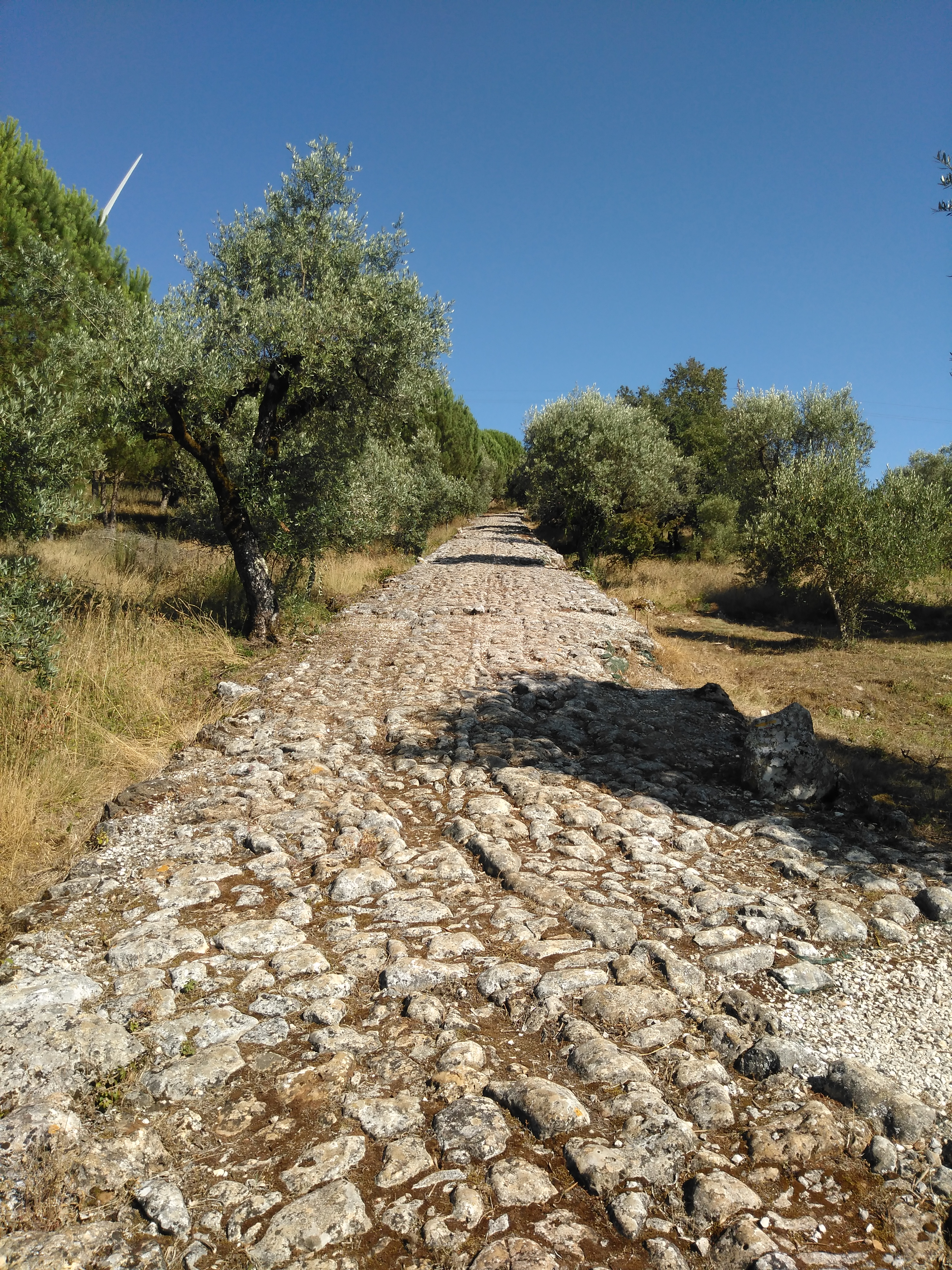

Population of the civil parish of Alqueidão da Serra (1864–2021)
Year	Pop.	±%
1864	842	—
1878	958	+13.8%
1890	1,072	+11.9%
1900	1,169	+9.0%
1911	1,339	+14.5%
1920	1,400	+4.6%
1930	1,597	+14.1%
1940	1,885	+18.0%
1950	2,060	+9.3%
1960	2,278	+10.6%
1970	1,860	−18.3%
1981	1,797	−3.4%
1991	1,767	−1.7%
2001	1,813	+2.6%
2011	1,755	−3.2%
2021	1,549	−11.7%
