= Mira de Aire =

- Civil parish
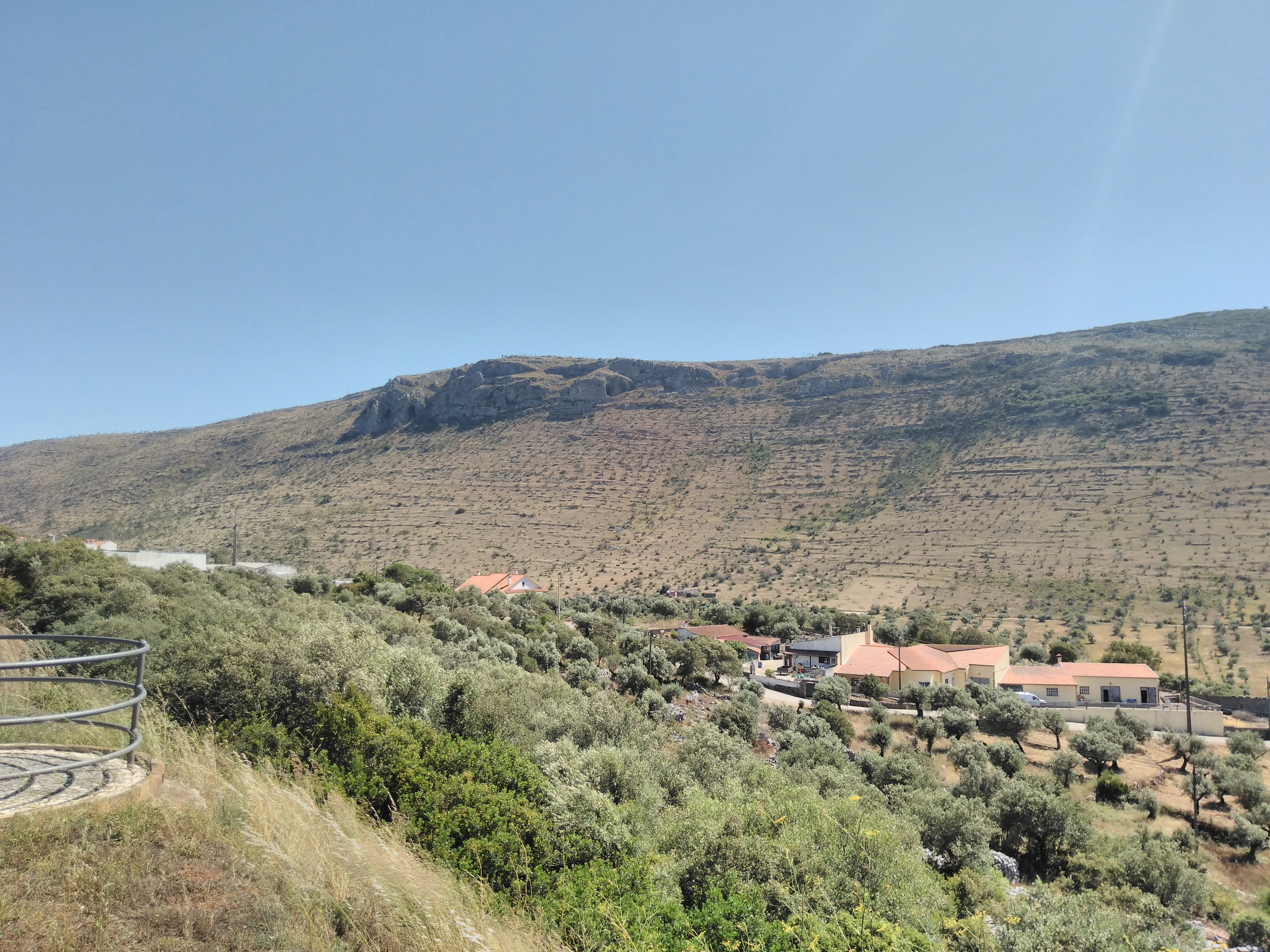
- Outskirts of the town

- Location in Portugal
- Coordinates: 39.544°N 8.716°W
- Country: Portugal
- Region: Centro
- Intermunic. comm.: Região de Leiria
- District: Leiria
- Municipality: Porto de Mós

Area
  - Total: 15.62 km^{2} (6.03 sq mi)

Population (2011)
  - Total: 3,775
  - Density: 241.7/km^{2} (625.9/sq mi)
- Time zone: UTC+00:00 (WET)
  - Summer (DST): UTC+01:00 (WEST)

Mira de Aire (Portuguese pronunciation: [ˈmiɾɐ ðɨ ˈajɾɨ]) is a small town in Porto de Mós Municipality, in the district of Leiria, Portugal. The population in 2011 was 3,775, in an area of 15.62 km^{2}.

A point of interest is the Natural Park of Serra de Aire e Candeeiros. The area is known for its caves that attract many tourists.

Mira de Aire is located about an hour from Portugal's capital Lisbon.
