= Porto de Mós =

- Municipality
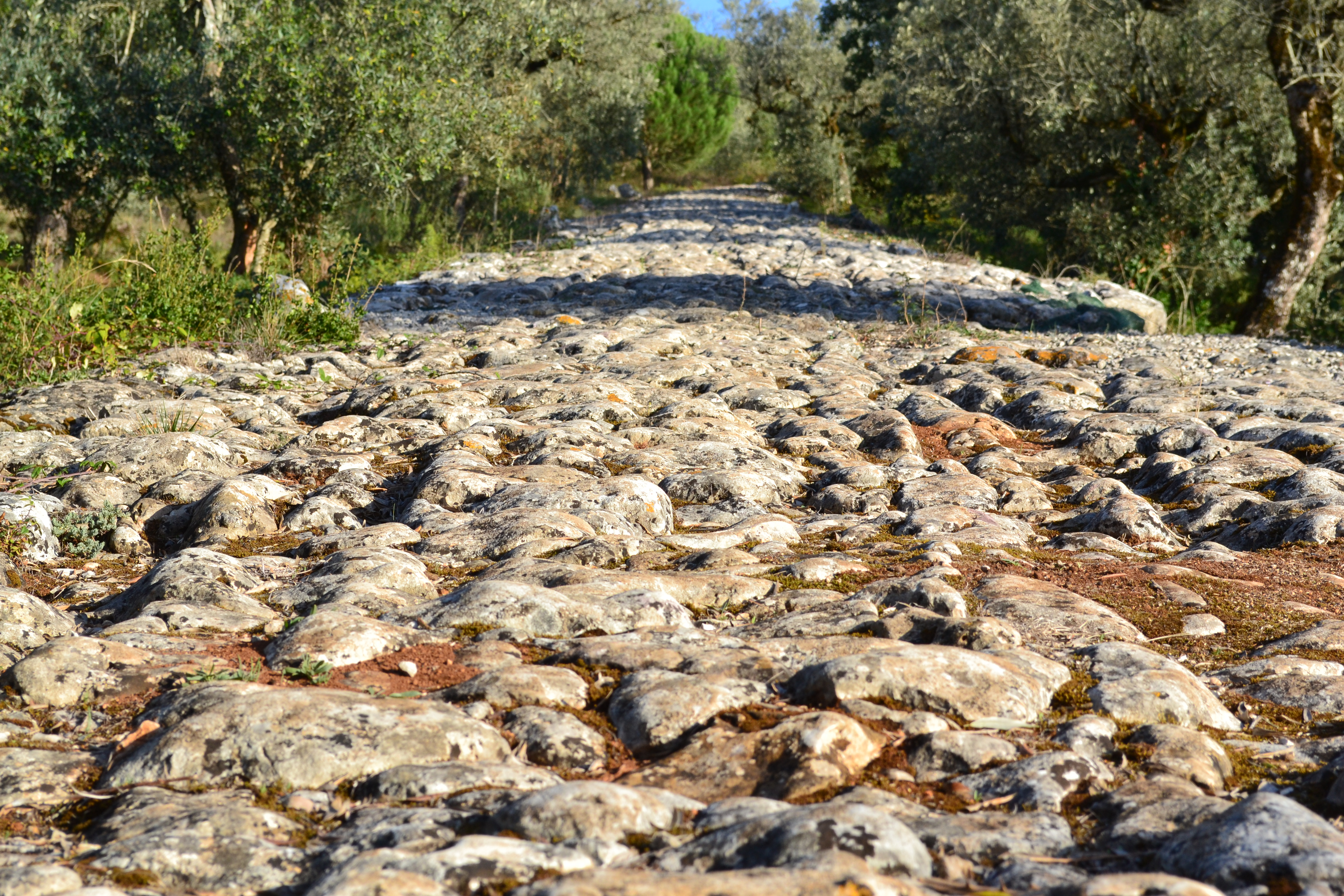
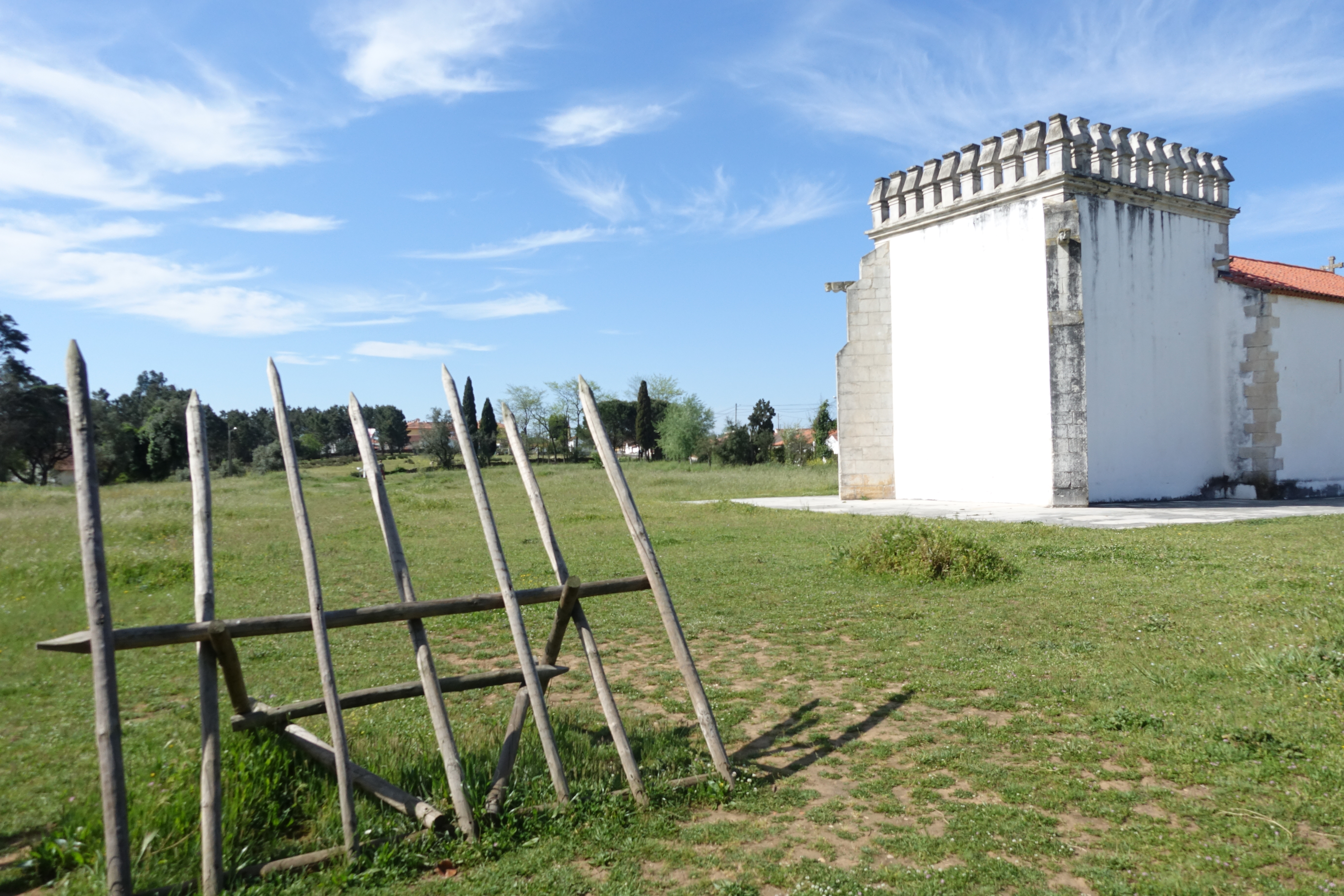
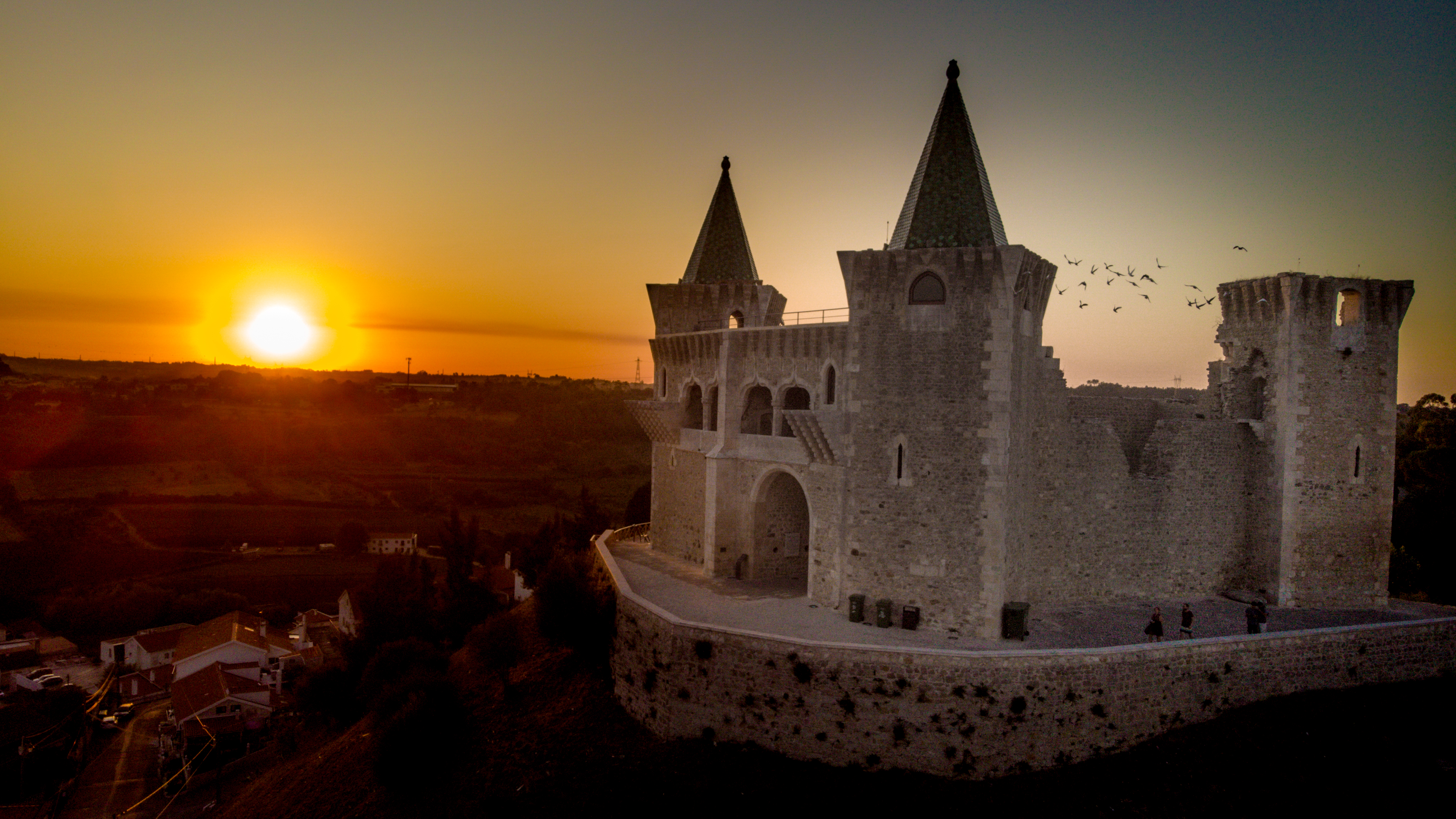
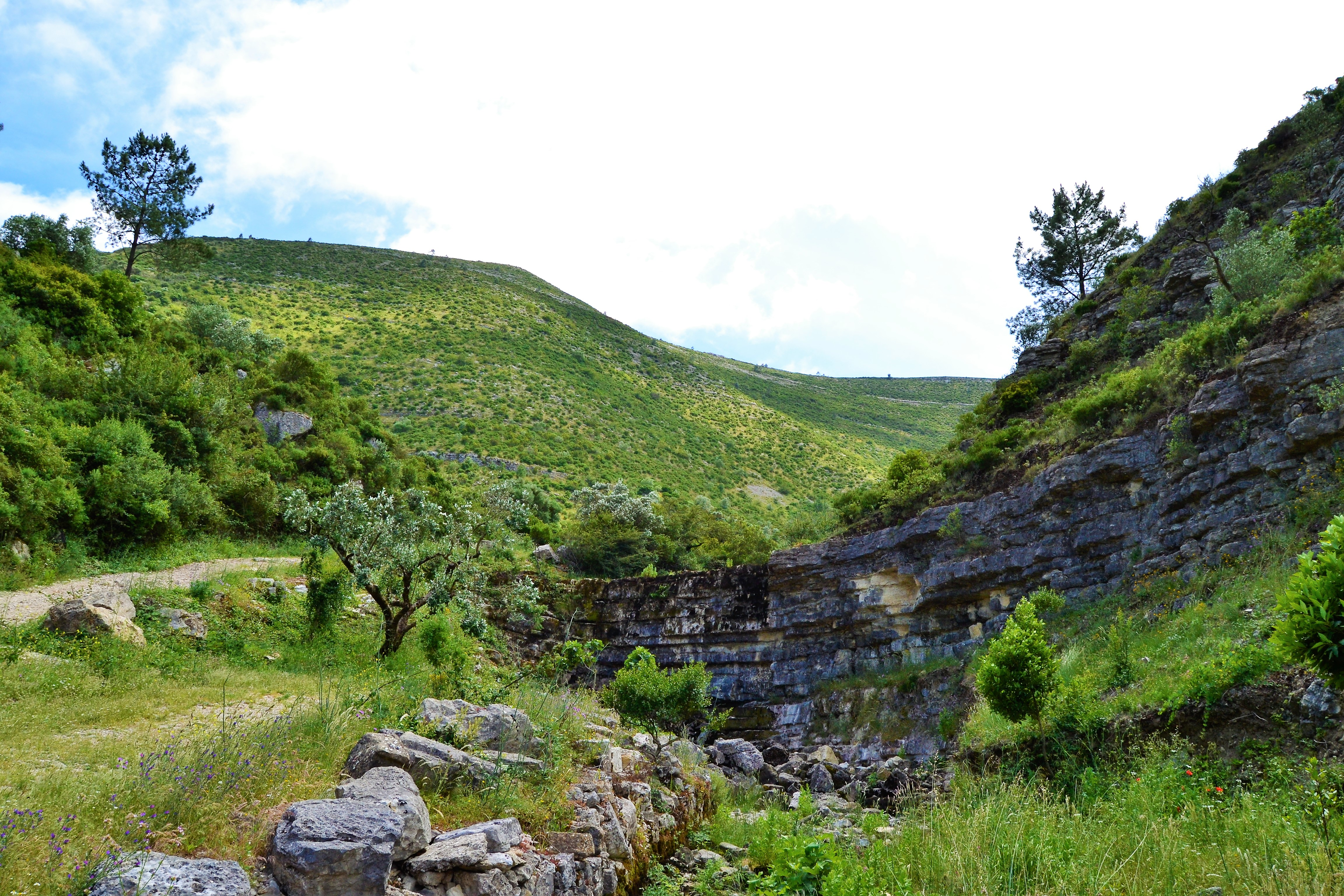
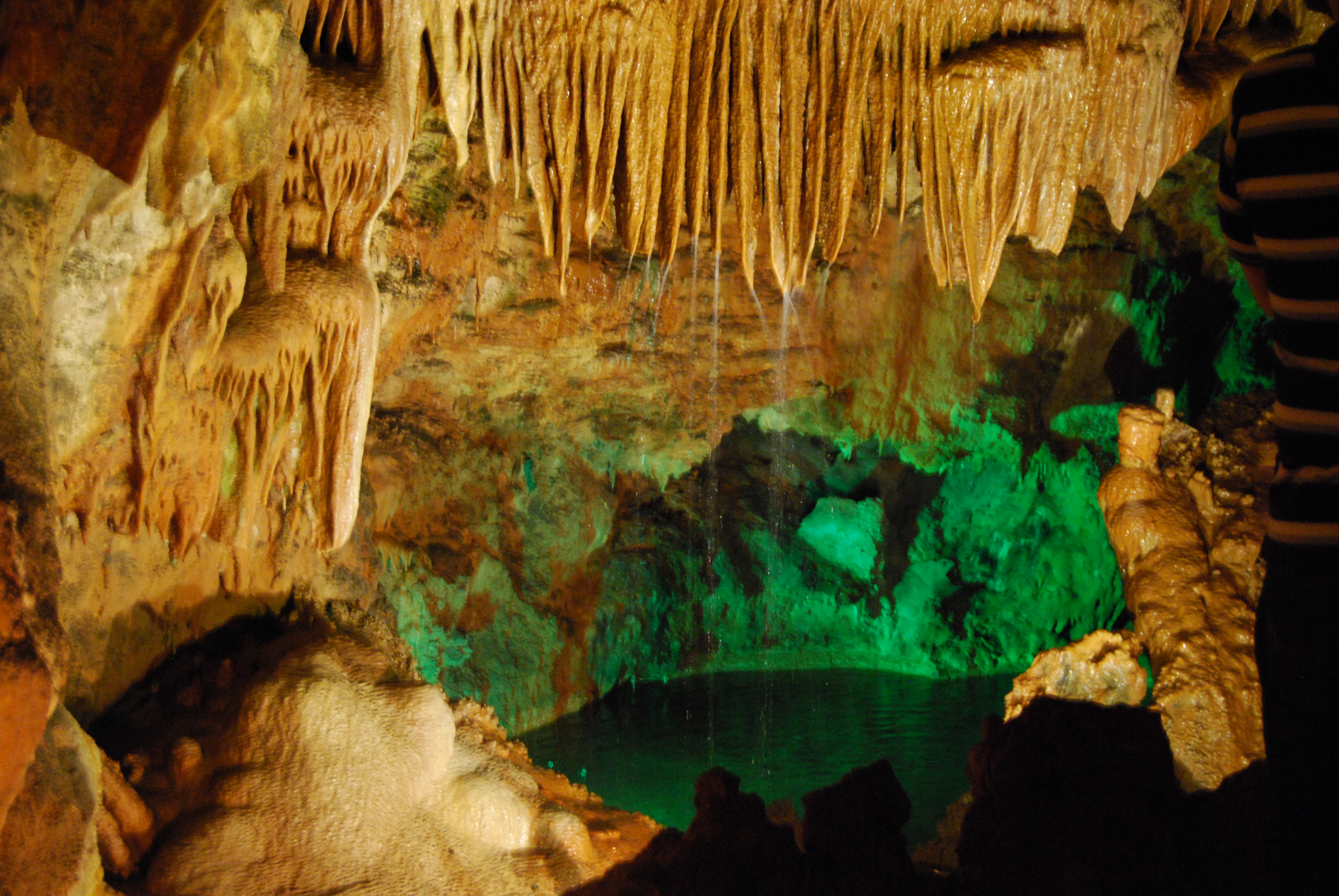
- From top down, left to right: Roman road in Alqueidão da Serra, battlefield of the Battle of Aljubarrota, Castle of Porto de Mós, Aire and Candeeiros Ranges Natural Park, Mira de Aire Caves

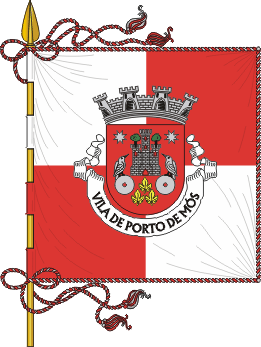
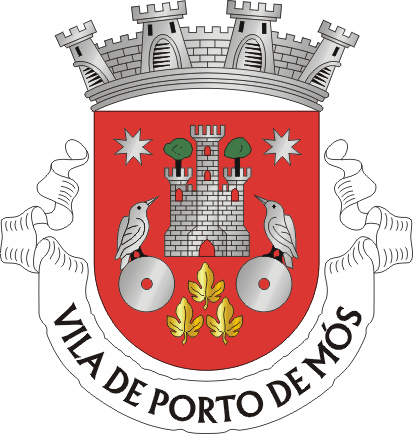
- Flag Coat of arms
- Interactive map of Porto de Mós
- Coordinates: 39°36′06″N 8°49′03″W
- Country: Portugal
- Region: Centro
- Intermunic. comm.: Região de Leiria
- District: Leiria
- Parishes: 10

Area
  - Total: 261.83 km^{2} (101.09 sq mi)

Population (2011)
  - Total: 24,342
  - Density: 92.969/km^{2} (240.79/sq mi)
- Time zone: UTC+00:00 (WET)
  - Summer (DST): UTC+01:00 (WEST)
- Website: www.municipio-portodemos.pt

Porto de Mós (European Portuguese pronunciation: [ˈpoɾtu ðɨ ˈmɔʃ]) is a town and a municipality of Estremadura province in Leiria District. It is in the Centro Region and the Pinhal Litoral subregion. The population in 2011 was 24,342, in an area of 261.83 km^{2}.

There were archeologic findings which link São Jorge, in the parish of Calvaria de Cima, as the exact place where the Battle of Aljubarrota was fought, crucial for maintaining the independence of Portugal in 1385. Currently, there is an interpretation center on the spot (Centre of Interpretation of the Battle of Aljubarrota) which helps visitors explore the battlefield and learn about the most important facts of this battle.

In this municipality, you can also find several caves carved in the mountains, the most important being Moinhos Velhos Cave, also known as Mira de Aire Cave.

A portion of the Serras de Aire e Candeeiros Natural Park is also located in Porto de Mós municipality.

== History ==
According to Nazaré's legend, the knight D. Fuas Roupinho, miraculated by Our Lady of Nazareth, in 1182, was the mayor of Porto de Mós. According to other sources, he defeated a large Muslim army that surrounded the castle, using the trick of hiding in the hills beforehand with part of his men. He defeated the enemy with a surprise attack on his camp during the night.

The county of Porto de Mós belonged to the Coutos de Alcobaça in 1230, donated by D. Sancho II, influencing for many centuries the life and habits of this region that was later given, by D. João I, to D. Nuno Álvares Pereira and to the House of Bragança, after the decisive Battle of Aljubarrota, on 14 August 1385.

In 1895 the county of Porto de Mós was extinct and became part of the county of Alcobaça, however this period was short-lived, since in 1898 it regained the status of county, but without the parish of Minde which joined the county of Torres Novas.

The town received a charter from King Dinis in 1305 and later received the Manueline charter from King Manuel in 1515.

== Geography ==
Porto de Mós is located in Portugal's Central Region, in the heart of the Aire and Candeeiros Mountains Natural Park.

From a morphological point of view, three sub-units can be distinguished in the Estremadura Limestone Massif of PNSAC - the Candeeiros Mountains to the west, the Santo António Plateau to the centre and south, and the São Mamede Plateau and the Aire Mountains, to the north and east, respectively. Separating these sub-units are three depressions caused by large fractures, respectively the Mendiga Depression, the Mira-Minde Cliff and the Alvados Depression.

Despite the absence of surface water courses in this region, water exists in abundance underground, constituting one of the largest underground freshwater reservoirs in our country that stretches between Rio Maior and Leiria.

The action of the waters, as a physical-chemical agent modelling the limestones, originated a landscape marked by characteristic relief forms, such as scarps and rocky outcrops, which give it a vigorous feature. Among these forms we can also highlight the lapiatic fields and the dolines. At subterranean level the "algares" stand out - natural vertical openings - in some cases tens of metres long, and which sometimes develop in depth through systems of galleries, rooms and wells which, as a whole, form caves.

== Parishes ==
Administratively, the municipality is divided into 10 civil parishes (freguesias):

- Alqueidão da Serra
- Alvados e Alcaria
- Arrimal e Mendiga
- Calvaria de Cima
- Juncal
- Mira de Aire
- Pedreiras
- Porto de Mós
- São Bento
- Serro Ventoso

== Notable people ==
- Ruth Garcês (1934–2006 in Porto de Mós) a Portuguese lawyer, magistrate and judge. She was the first female magistrate and the first female judge in Portugal.
- Olga Silvestre (1964– ) is a Portuguese lawyer and a deputy in the Assembly of the Republic representing the Leiria constituency,

== Gallery ==
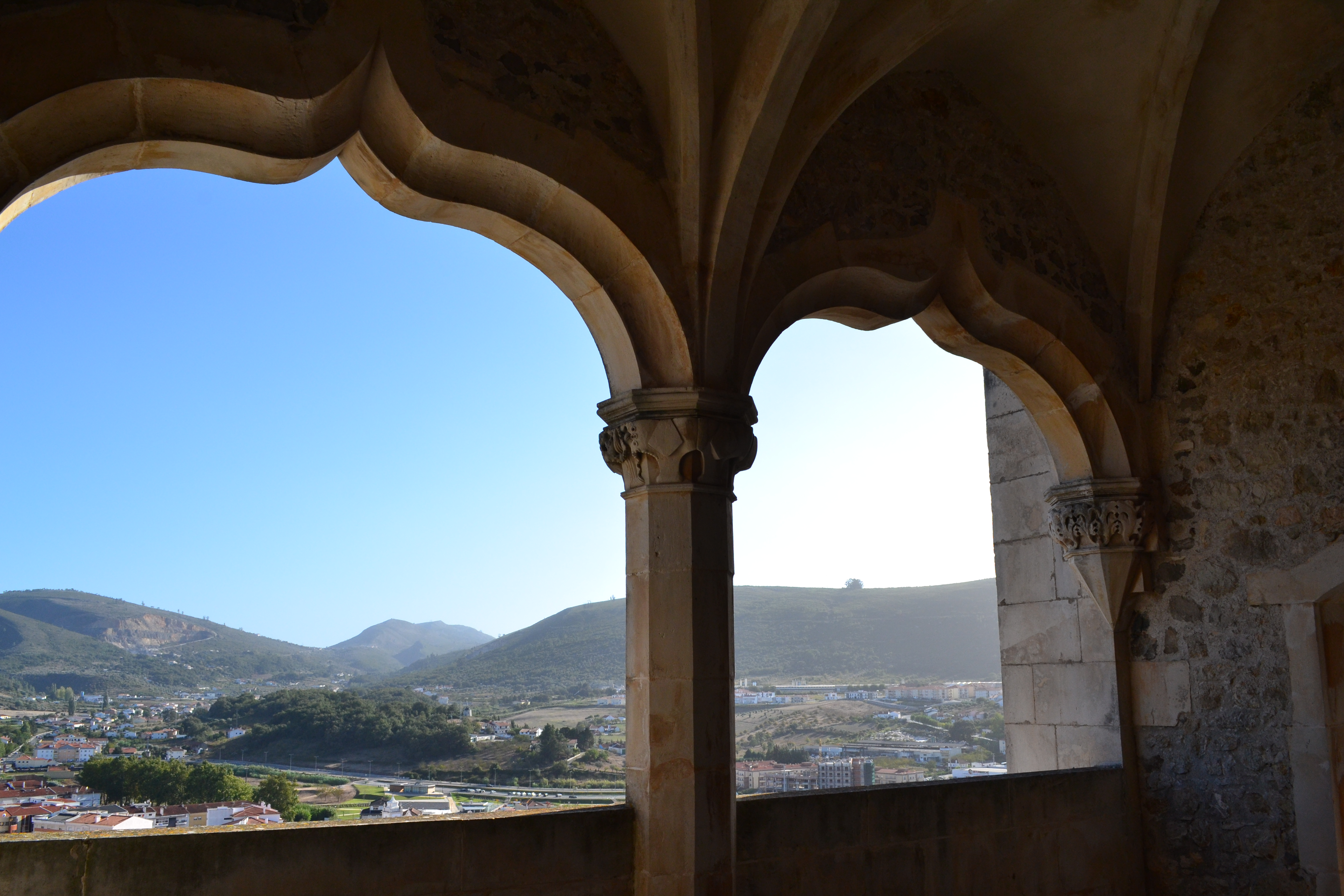

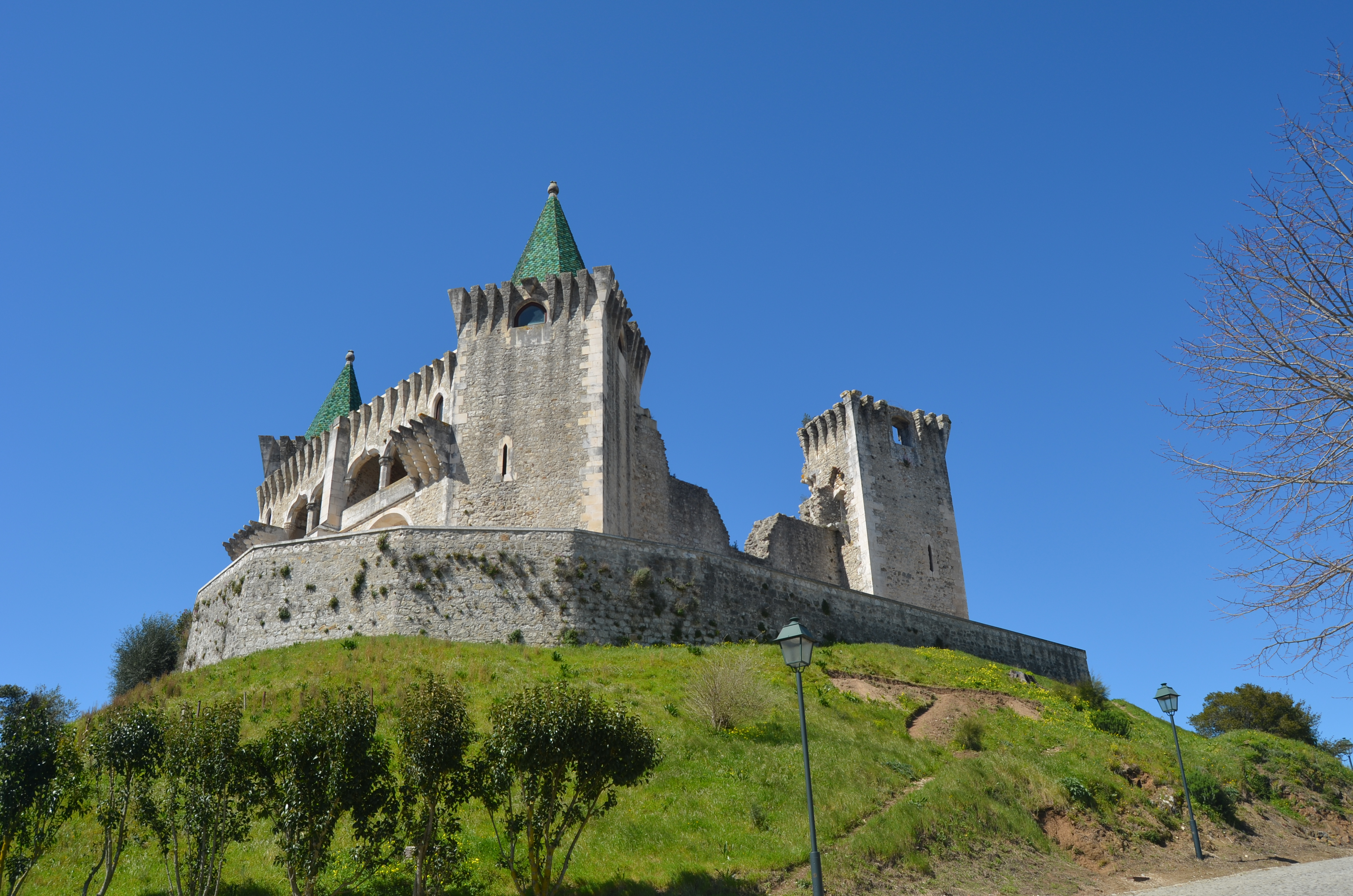

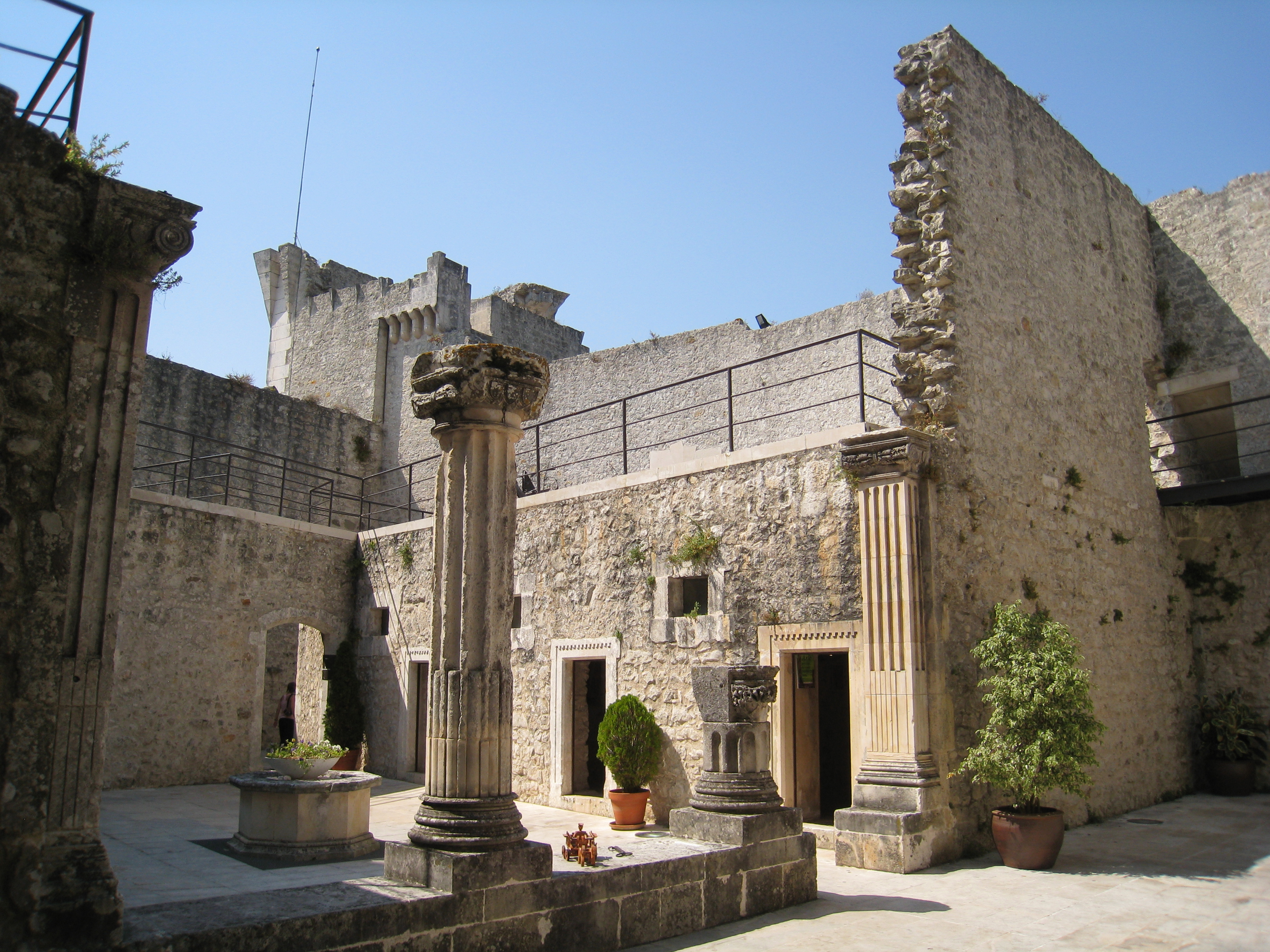

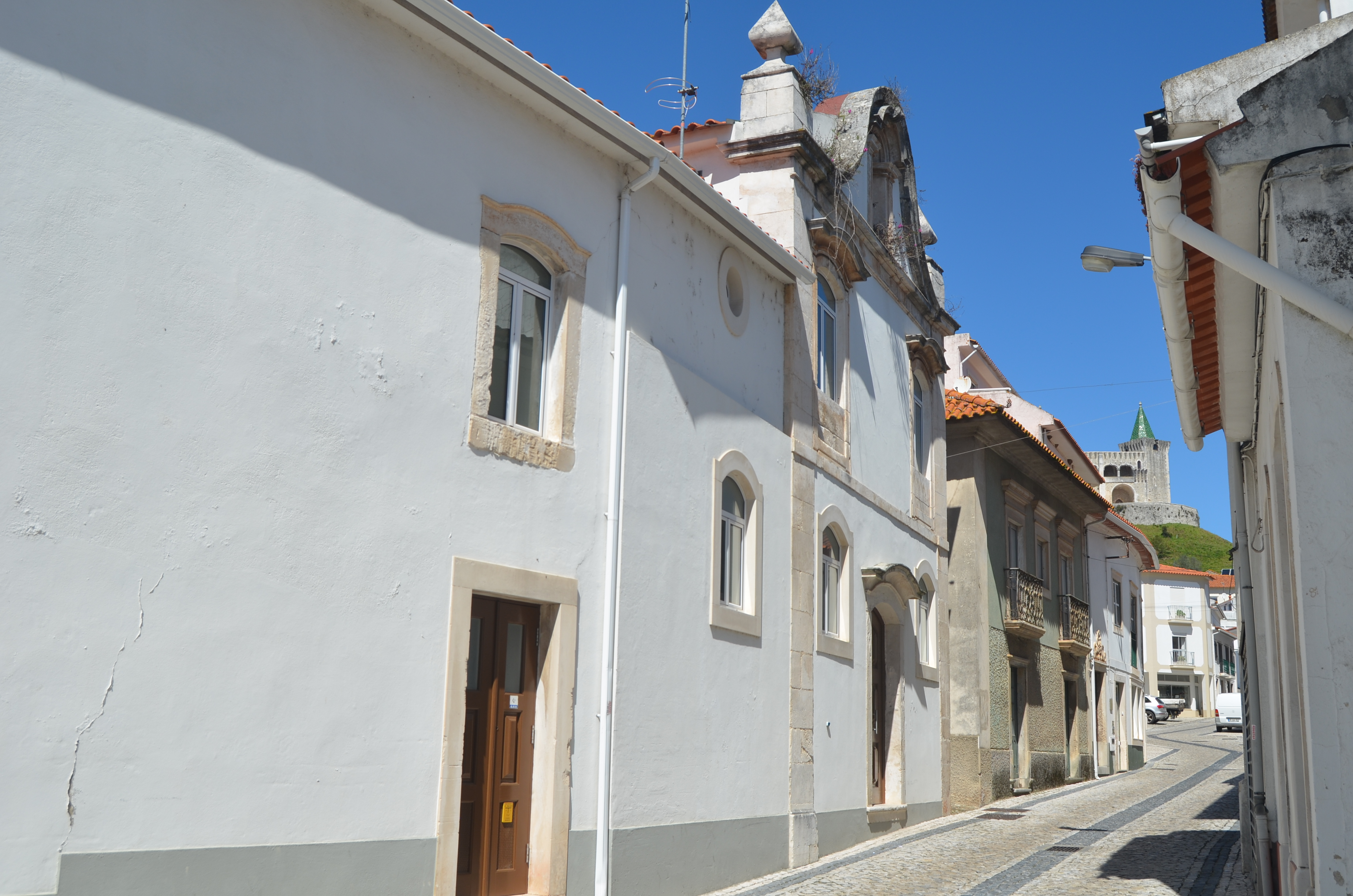

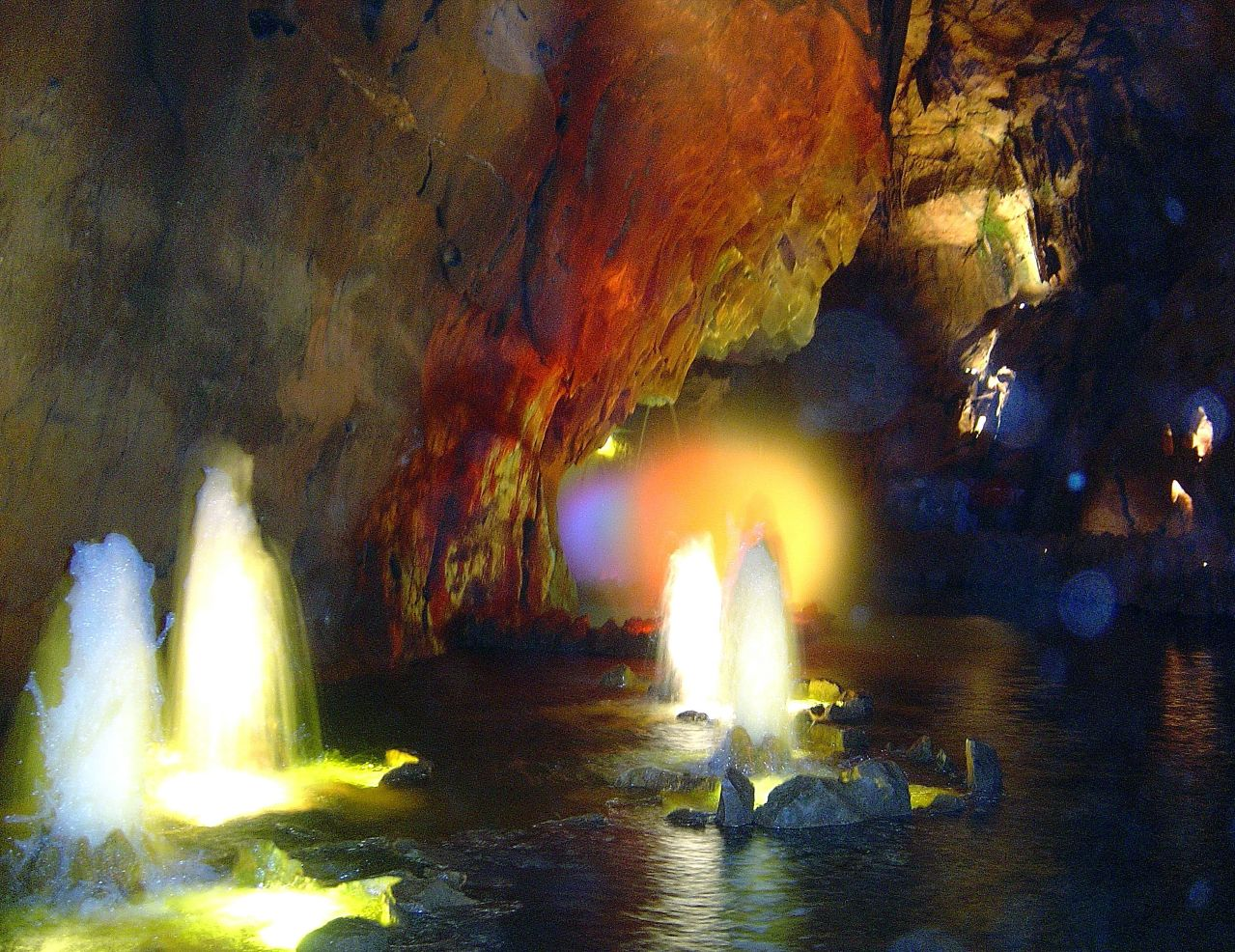
Mira de Aire Caves
