= Aldeia do Mato =

Former civil parish in Portugal

- Civil parish
- Location in Portugal
- Coordinates: 39°32′32″N 8°16′18″W
- Country: Portugal
- Region: Oeste e Vale do Tejo
- Intermunic. comm.: Médio Tejo
- District: Santarém
- Municipality: Abrantes
- Disbanded: 2013

Area
  - Total: 31.68 km^{2} (12.23 sq mi)

Population (2011)
  - Total: 441
  - Density: 13.9/km^{2} (36.1/sq mi)
- Time zone: UTC+00:00 (WET)
  - Summer (DST): UTC+01:00 (WEST)
- Postal code: 2200-601
- Area code: 241
- Patron: Santa Maria Madalena

Aldeia do Mato is a former freguesia ("civil parish"), located in the municipality of Abrantes, in Santarém District, Portugal. In 2013, the parish merged into the new parish Aldeia do Mato e Souto. The population in 2011 was 441, in an area of 31.68 km².

== History ==
The parish had its beginning in the 13th century, when the area was then referred to as Aldeia da Mata, and recognized for the quantity of wood gathered in the district (aldeia da mata is Portuguese for hamlet of the hinterland). It was also recognized for the land rents obtained from cultivation and harvesting of olive and pine trees.

The parochial church, dedicated to Santa Maria Madalena had its origin in the 18th century.

A marble cross was located near the two fountains of São João and São José, and later restored in 1850.

The construction of the Barregem do Castelo do Bode (Castelo do Bode Dam) in 1951, caused the disappearance of the fields of olive trees which were lost to make way for the new reservoir.

== Geography ==
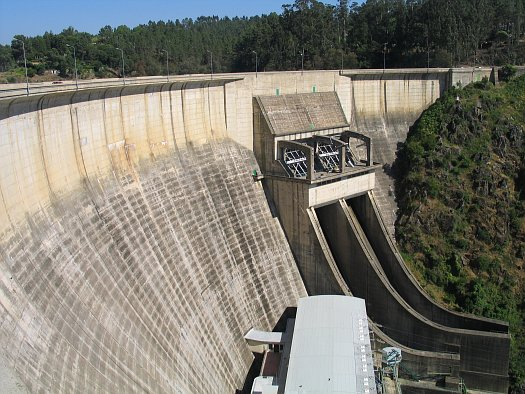
Castelo do Bodo Dam, providing electrical power and leisure activities in the parish of Aldeia do Mato since the 1950s

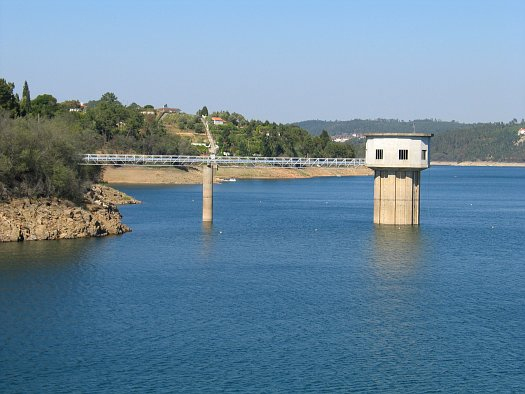
Part of the reservoir system at Castelo do Bode in Aldeia do Mato

The parish is located in the northeastern part of the municipality, neighboring the parishes of Souto (to the northeast and east), Martinchel (to the west), São Vicente (in the east) and Rio de Moinhos (along the west) and with the municipalities of Tomar (to the north) and Constância (to the east). It contains the localities Aldeia do Mato, Bairros Cimeiro, Cabeça Gorda, Carreira do Mato, Casinha, Fundeiro, Medroa, Pucariça, Vale de Chões and Vale Manso.

=== Ecoregions/Protected areas ===
- Recreational and Leisure Nautical Park of Aldeia do Mato (Portuguese: Parque Náutico de Recreio e Lazer da Aldeia do Mato), opened from 1 May to 31 October, the recreational park is concentrated on the Castelo do Bode Reservoir (Portuguese: Albufeira do Castelo de Bode). One of the larger watersheds in the country, that extends for 60 kilometres (37 mi), it is fed by the Zêzere River) which, in addition to producing electrical power, has been the centre of the community since it was constructed (primarily as a leisure playground). The Recreational and Leisure Nautical Park attracts tourists from within the country, owing to biodiversity (that includes various species of wild pine, eucalyptus, strawberry tree, heather, olive trees), water sports (swimming, sailing, kayaking, canoeing, windsurfing), and recent developments that have attracted new tourists, including hiking trails, motocrossing, repelling and other trips orientated towards the more adventurous;
  - Beach of Cabeça Gorda;
  - Beach of Bairro Fundeiro
  - Beach of Aldeia do Mato

== Economy ==
Between 50-60 percent of the lands in the parish remain dedicated to cultivation of trees for harvesting, primarily pine but gradually eucalyptus, for its rapid growth.

== Architecture ==
=== Civic ===
- Fountain of São João
- Fountain of São José

=== Religious ===
- Cross of Aldeia do Mato (Portuguese: Cruzeiro de Aldeia do Mato), located in the Largo da Cruzeiro, it was reconstructed during the 20th century;
- Church of Santa Maria Madalena (Portuguese: Matriz Church of Santa Maria Madalena), constructed in the 18th century and dedicated to Mary Magdalene, it was reconstructed during the 20th century (beginning of May 1991) and inaugurated in January 1993;
- Church of Carreira do Mato (Portuguese: Igreja do Sagrado Coração de Maria/Igreja de Carreira do Mato), dedicated to the Sacred Heart of Mary, located in Carreira do Mato, and constructed from a historic chapel on the same site;
- Church of Pucariça (Portuguese: Igreja da Pucariça)

== Culture ==
The region is known for its culinary; in addition to several restaurants, the local peoples of the region are known for their broas de santos and bolo de fugas.

Locally, the annual festival season is marked by the festival of Aldeia do Mato (on the last weekend of July), Cabeça Gorda (the second weekend of August), and the festival of Carreira do Mato (fourth weekend in August).
