= São Vicente (Abrantes) =

Former civil parish in Portugal

- Civil parish
- Location in Portugal
- Coordinates: 39.4803°N 8.2017°W
- Country: Portugal
- Region: Centro
- Municipality: Abrantes
- Disbanded: 2013

Area
  - Total: 38.20 km^{2} (14.75 sq mi)

Population (2011)
  - Total: 11,622
  - Density: 300/km^{2} (790/sq mi)
- Time zone: UTC+00:00 (WET)
  - Summer (DST): UTC+01:00 (WEST)
- Postal code: 2200-301
- Patron: São Vicente Mártir

São Vicente is a former freguesia ("civil parish"), located in the municipality of Abrantes, in Santarém District, Portugal. In 2013, the parish merged into the new parish Abrantes (São Vicente e São João) e Alferrarede. The population in 2011 was 11,622, in an area of 38.20 km^{2}. It included the northern part of the city of Abrantes.

== History ==
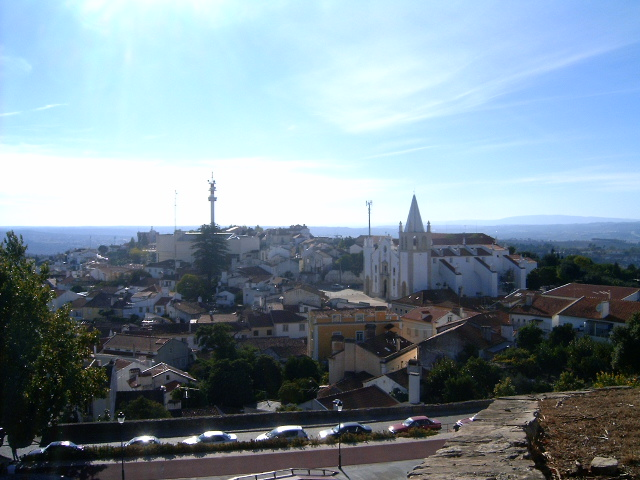
The central square of São Vicente with the parish church dedicated to São Vicente Mártir

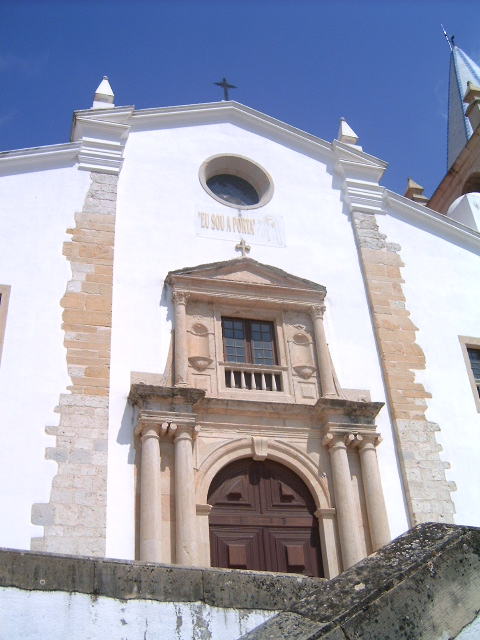
The front façade of the Chapel of São Vicente Mártir

A parish of São Vicente is the principal religious organ of the community of Abrantes, and its foundation dates back to the Goths. The ancient church of São Vicente was founded in 1149, after Afonso Henriques took Abrantes Castle, but it subsequently received damage from Moorish attacks and was rebuilt.

It was known until 1150, as the parish of Nossa Senhora da Conceição and reconsecrated by the first alcaide from permission obtained from Afonso Henriques (a reliquary of São Vicente Mártir was installed in the church). The church was reconstructed under the initiative of King Sebastião, a project that concluded in 1590 under Philip I, completed and elaborated in the mannerist style.

It became a priory and vicarage of the Royal Prior, Father Carvalho e Avelino de Almeida, but by 1758 these institutions (including many of the religious parishes, paróquias, of Abrantes, such as São Pedro and Santa Maria do Castelo) were under the protection of the Marquis of Abrantes. Parish records for 1862 refer to São Vicente being passed on to the Marquis of Abrantes by the Order of Christ. The vicar of São Vicente represented the clergy of São Pedro de Alvega, São Silvestre de Aboboreira, Santa Eufémia de Rio de Moinhos and Santa Luzia do Pego, alternately with the parish of São João Baptista which was the seat of the adjunct, treasury and administration of the diocese.

The parish administration of São Vicente was merged with that of Santa Maria do Castelo around 1834, although records for the latter continued until 1774.

Today, the religious parish is part of the diocese of Portalegre-Castelo Branco.

== Geography ==
The long and narrow parish of São Vicente, which includes the northern half of the city of Abrantes, is mostly a large rural community. Its immediate neighbors are the Abrantes parishes of Carvalhal (to the north), Alferrarede (to the east), São João (to the southeast), São Miguel do Rio Torto (in the south), Tramagal (in the southwest), Rio de Moinhos and Aldeia do Mato (to the west) and Souto (to the northwest), as well as the municipality of Sardoal (in the northeast). It has as its border the right margin of the Tagus River, which it shares with São Miguel do Rio Torto and Tramagal.

== Architecture ==
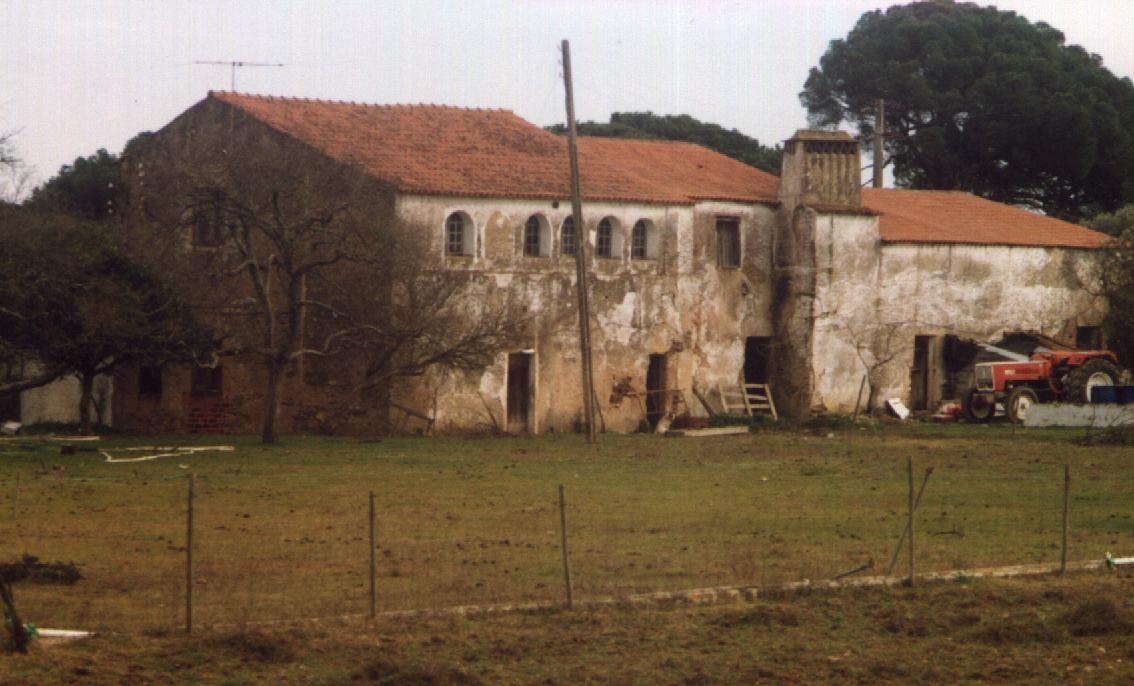
The ruins of the medieval convent of Santo António

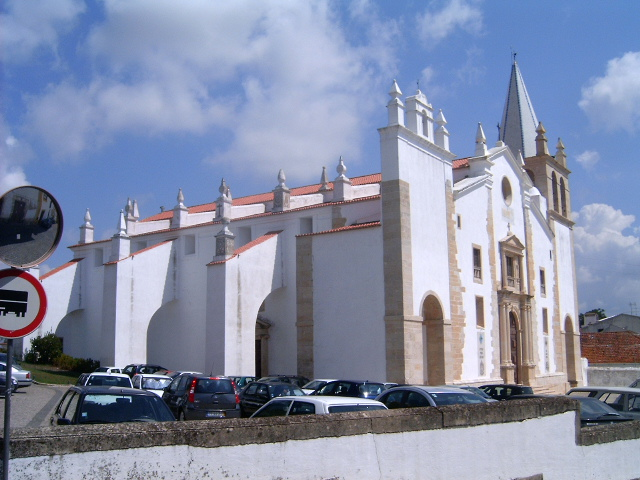
The reinforced buttresses of the mannerist temple of São Vicente Mártir

- Convent of Santo António (Portuguese: Convento de Santo António), located in the Quinta da Arca, and likely founded in 1526, but found in a state of decay and ruins, emblematic for its iconic 17 archways. It was built under the orders of Philip I of Portugal, who order the transfer of the original convent from Ribeira da Abrançalha at the end of the 16th century or beginning of the 17th century, with the support of Lopo de Almeida, Count of Abrantes. But, by the end of the 17th century the convent had already been largely abandoned by the monks, who moved to the centre Abrantes and the property sold to Diogo Marchão and Maria Gamita. In the second half of the 19th century the land was obtained by João Freire Temudo Fialho de Mendonça and became part of the Quinta da Arca.
- Hermitage of São Lourenço (Portuguese: Ermida de São Lourenço), a small chapel dating back to the 16th century, alongside the Abrante's Parque Urbano (English: urban park)

== Culture ==
Among its many religious or secular holidays, the parish of São Vicente is remembered for the Festa de São Lourenço (which falls on the last weekend of August and first of September) and the Festa da Abrançalha (which occurs on the last weekend of May or first weekend of June). In addition, the feast days of Paul (July), Our Lady of Graces (May) and Our Lady of Light (8 September) round out the religious celebrations with the community.
