= Ribatejo Province =

Former province of Portugal

Coordinates: 39°14′N 8°41′W

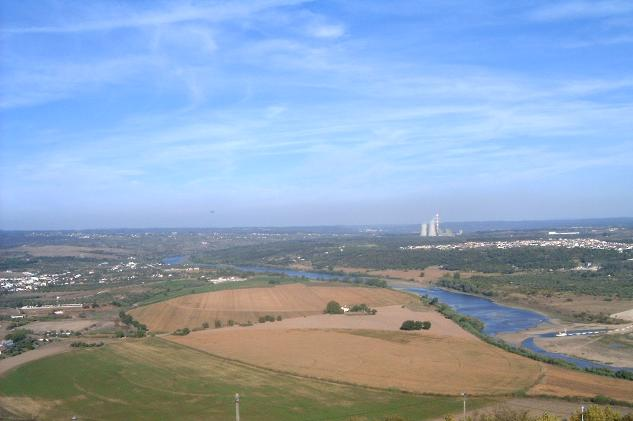
Tagus river at Pego

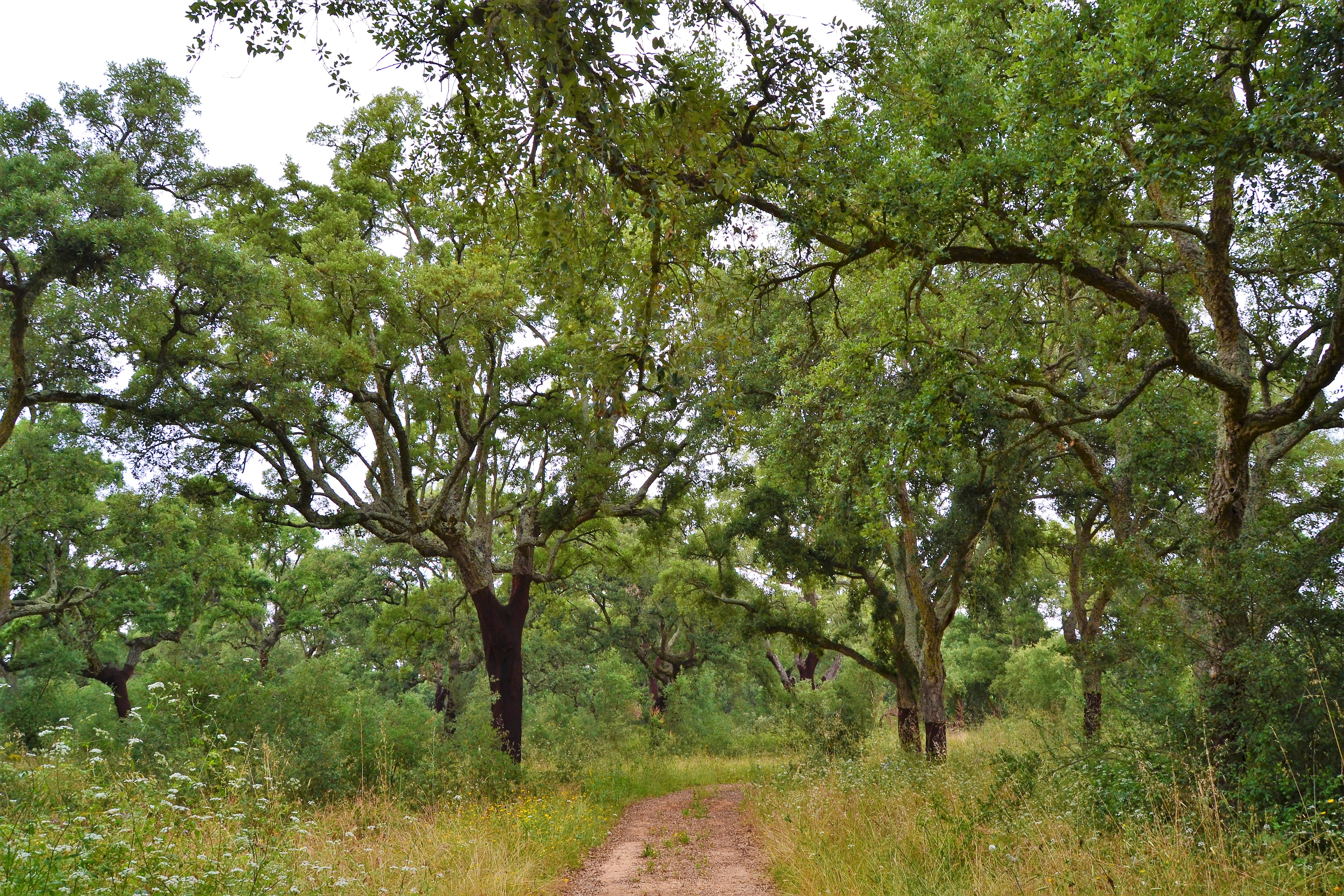
Boquilobo Bog Natural Reserve

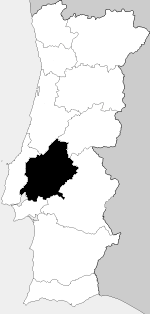
Former province of Ribatejo

The Tagus river crossing Ribatejo

The Ribatejo (Portuguese pronunciation: [ʁiβɐˈtɛʒu]) was the most central of the traditional provinces of Portugal, with no coastline or border with Spain. The region is crossed by the Tagus river (Ribatejo translates to "upper Tagus", or more precisely, "up the Tagus" relative to Lisbon at its mouth). The region contains some of the nation's richest agricultural land, and it produces most of the animals used in the Portuguese style of bullfighting.

Ribatejo Province was formally created in 1936. It contained the municipalities of Abrantes, Alcanena, Almeirim, Alpiarça, Azambuja, Benavente, Cartaxo, Chamusca, Constância, Coruche, Entroncamento, Ferreira do Zêzere, Golegã, Rio Maior, Salvaterra de Magos, Santarém, Sardoal, Tomar, Torres Novas, Vila Franca de Xira and Vila Nova da Barquinha. The largest towns were Santarém and Tomar.

In 1976 the Ribatejo Province was dissolved. Most of the area belongs to the Santarém District.

For EU statistical purposes, it was divided between the Lezíria do Tejo, Médio Tejo, Lisbon metropolitan area and Alto Alentejo subregions (NUTS III), belonging to the West and Tagus Valley, Lisbon and Alentejo EU statistical regions (NUTS II).

== Municipalities ==
- Lisboa District: Arruda dos Vinhos, Azambuja and Vila Franca de Xira municipalities
- Portalegre District: Ponte de Sor municipality
- Santarém District: Abrantes, Alcanena, Almeirim, Alpiarça, Benavente, Cartaxo, Chamusca, Constância, Coruche, Ferreira do Zêzere, Golegã, Rio Maior, Salvaterra de Magos, Santarém, Sardoal, Tomar, Torres Novas and Vila Nova da Barquinha municipalities

== See also ==
- Lezíria do Tejo
- Tejo VR, a wine region formerly known as Ribatejo VR
- Rotas de Portugal - Ribatejo
- O melhor do Ribatejo
- Comunidade Intermunicipal da Lezíria do Tejo
- Distrito de Santarém
