= Souto (Abrantes) =

Former civil parish in Portugal

- Civil parish
- Location in Portugal
- Coordinates: 39°33′58.11″N 8°14′23.92″W
- Country: Portugal
- Region: Oeste e Vale do Tejo
- Intermunic. comm.: Médio Tejo
- District: Santarém
- Municipality: Abrantes
- Established: Parish: 21 October 1629
- Disbanded: 2013

Area
  - Total: 13.09 km^{2} (5.05 sq mi)
- Elevation: 210 m (690 ft)

Population (2011)
  - Total: 418
  - Density: 31.9/km^{2} (82.7/sq mi)
- Time zone: UTC+00:00 (WET)
  - Summer (DST): UTC+01:00 (WEST)
- Postal code: 2230-807
- Area code: 241
- Patron: São Silvestre
- Website: http://www.souto.com

Souto is a former freguesia ("civil parish"), located in the municipality of Abrantes, in Santarém District, Portugal. In 2013, the parish merged into the new parish Aldeia do Mato e Souto. The population in 2011 was 418, in an area of 13.09 km^{2}.

== History ==
The name of this region developed from the existence of a dense forest of chestnut trees; its toponymy is a literal translation of this type of vegetation. The population of the region date back to the Calcolithic period of prehistoric settlement.

During the Spanish invasion of Portugal during the Peninsular Wars it was a point of resistance; the Count of Schaumburg-Lippe-Bückeburg, William, established a line of defence in Souto as part of his intervention, under the authority of the Marquess of Pombal to protect Portugal.

Souto received its parish status on 21 October 1629.

== Geography ==
The civil parish is located in the northern part of the municipality, neighbouring the parishes of Fontes (to the north); Carvalhal (to the east); São Vicente and Aldeia do Mato (to the west); separated from the municipality of Tomar by the Tagus River. It is the 17th largest parish by area, 18th by population and 12 in population density.

In addition to the parish seat, the parish includes several settlements, including Atalaia, Bioucas, Carregal, Maxieira, Quinta and Ribeira da Brunheta.
