= Fontes (Abrantes) =

Civil parish in Portugal

- Civil parish
- Location in Portugal
- Coordinates: 39.606°N 8.228°W
- Country: Portugal
- Region: Oeste e Vale do Tejo
- Intermunic. comm.: Médio Tejo
- District: Santarém
- Municipality: Abrantes

Area
  - Total: 28.49 km^{2} (11.00 sq mi)

Population (2011)
  - Total: 627
  - Density: 22.0/km^{2} (57.0/sq mi)
- Time zone: UTC+00:00 (WET)
  - Summer (DST): UTC+01:00 (WEST)

Fontes is a Portuguese freguesia ("civil parish"), located in Abrantes Municipality, in Santarém District. The population in 2011 was 627, in an area of 28.49 km^{2} (11.00 sq mi). The parish is located in the northern part of the municipality, neighbouring the parishes of Carvalhal, to the east, Souto, to the south and borders Vila de Rei Municipality to the north. It is separated from the Tomar Municipality by the Zêzere River.
