= Mouriscas =

Parish in Centro Region, Portugal

- Civil parish
- Location in Portugal
- Coordinates: 39.503°N 8.095°W
- Country: Portugal
- Region: Oeste e Vale do Tejo
- Intermunic. comm.: Médio Tejo
- District: Santarém
- Municipality: Abrantes

Area
  - Total: 35.02 km^{2} (13.52 sq mi)

Population (2011)
  - Total: 1,832
  - Density: 52/km^{2} (140/sq mi)
- Time zone: UTC+00:00 (WET)
  - Summer (DST): UTC+01:00 (WEST)

Mouriscas is a Portuguese freguesia ("civil parish"), located in Abrantes Municipality, in Santarém District. The population in 2011 was 1,832, in an area of 35.02 km^{2}. The parish stands in the north bank of the Tagus River and borders the parishes of Concavada, Pego and Alferrarede. It also borders the Mação Municipality and Sardoal Municipality.
