= São João (Abrantes) =

Former civil parish in Portugal

- Civil parish
- Location in Portugal
- Coordinates: 39.4575°N 8.1942°W
- Country: Portugal
- Region: Centro
- Municipality: Abrantes
- Disbanded: 2013

Area
  - Total: 2.21 km^{2} (0.85 sq mi)

Population (2011)
  - Total: 1,699
  - Density: 770/km^{2} (2,000/sq mi)
- Time zone: UTC+00:00 (WET)
  - Summer (DST): UTC+01:00 (WEST)
- Postal code: 2200-397
- Patron: São João Baptista

São João, or São João Baptista, is a former freguesia ("civil parish"), located in the municipality of Abrantes, in Santarém District, Portugal. In 2013, the parish merged into the new parish Abrantes (São Vicente e São João) e Alferrarede. The population in 2011 was 1,699, in an area of 2.21 km². It was one of the three parishes that make up the urbanized area of the city.

== History ==
The origin of São João has its base in the early settlement of Abrantes, first documented in 1176. Afonso Henriques granted its castle to the Order of Santiago de la Espada in 1173. Three years later, he granted its fish channel to the Monastery of Lorvão. The grant was partly in aid of the residents, but entitled the King to nine-tenths of the catch. In 1179, Afonso Henriques granted a foral to Abrantes, which was confirmed by King Afonso II in 1217. On 24 April 1281, King Denis granted Abrantes to his wife, Queen Elizabeth of Portugal. He continued to expand the fort, building the detention block. With the aim of expanding the settlement, he extended its jurisdiction to include Punhete (today's Constância).

In the 17th and 18th centuries, Abrantes was an important military base, classified a Praça de Guerra de 1.ª Ordem (English: War Plaza of the First Order).

In 1807, during the Napoleonic invasions of the peninsula, the fort and parish were a staging point for Marshall Jean-Andoche Junot's troops (23 November). Later, Marshall André Masséna's forces encircled the fort and settlement, but the Anglo-Portuguese troops and local inhabitants defended the parish, until he was forced to retire from Portugal to Spain.

The Church of Saint John the Baptist (Portuguese: Igreja de São João Baptista) was founded in 1300, by Queen Elizabeth of Portugal, and the settlement was elevated to parish rank shortly after (in 1326). It was from this church that King John I departed for Aljubarrota, after Mass on 8 August 1385, vowing to return and offer thanksgiving for success in battle. With victory achieved, he returned and had a rock sculpture of John the Baptist erected.

== Geography ==
The parish is a circular administrative division located on the northern margin of the Tagus River, at the southern border of the city of Abrantes. Neighbouring parishes include Alferrarede (to the east), Rossio ao Sul do Tejo (to the southwest), São Miguel do Rio Torto (to the southwest) and São Vicente (to the northwest).

== Architecture ==
=== Military ===
- Fortaleza de Abrantes (English: Fort of Abrantes)

=== Religious ===
- Igreja de Santa Maria do Castelo (English: Church of Blessed Virgin Mary of the Castle)
- Igreja de São João Baptista (English: Church of Saint John the Baptist)
- Igreja da Misercórdia (English: Church of Forgiveness)
- Convento de São Domingos (English: Convent of Saint Dominic)

== Culture ==
=== Festivities ===
The Festas de Abrantes (English: Festivals of Abrantes), celebrated on the second week of June and which each year attract about 250,000 visitors, are the principal socio-cultural event of the parish. The religious Festa da Nossa Senhora da Boa Viagem (English: Feast/Festival of Our Lady of Good Voyage), in the locality of Barreiras do Tejo, is celebrated each year in August/September.
