= Fernando Bento =

Macanese footballer

Personal information
- Full name: Fernando Manuel Lopes Alves Bento
- Date of birth: 19 September 1960 (age 66)
- Place of birth: Mouriscas, Abrantes, Portugal
- Height: 1.76 m (5 ft 9 in)
- Position: Goalkeeper

Youth career
- Monte de Caparica

Senior career*
Years	Team	Apps	(Gls)
1979–1982	Monte de Caparica		
1982–1985	Operário Lisboa		
1985–1986	Monte de Caparica		
1986–1987	Usseira		
1997–1988	Vitória Lisboa		
1988–1990	Sertanense		
1990–1991	Lixa		
1991–1992	Proença-a-Nova		
1992–1993	Portalegrense		
1993–1994	Alhandra		
1994–1995	Negro Rubro		
1996	Leng Ngan		
1997–1998	Lam Pak		
2001–2002	Monte de Caparica		

International career
1997	Macau	2	(0)
- * Club domestic league appearances and goals

Fernando Manuel Lopes Alves Bento (born 19 September 1960) is a former Macanese international footballer.

== Career statistics ==
=== International ===
National team	Year	Apps	Goals
Macau	1997	2	0
Total		2	0
