= Abrantes (São Vicente e São João) e Alferrarede =

Civil parish in Portugal

- Civil parish
- Location in Portugal
- Coordinates: 39.47°N 8.20°W
- Country: Portugal
- Region: Oeste e Vale do Tejo
- Intermunic. comm.: Médio Tejo
- District: Santarém
- Municipality: Abrantes

Area
  - Total: 64.47 km^{2} (24.89 sq mi)

Population (2021)
  - Total: 16,138
  - Density: 250.3/km^{2} (648.3/sq mi)
- Time zone: UTC+00:00 (WET)
  - Summer (DST): UTC+01:00 (WEST)

Union of Parishes of Abrantes e São Vicente e São João e Alferrarede is a freguesia ("civil parish") in the municipality of Abrantes on Santarém District Portugal. It was formed in 2013 by the merger of the former parishes São Vicente, São João and Alferrarede. The population in 2011 was 17,205, in an area of 64.47 km^{2} (24.89 sq mi).
