= Alferrarede =

Former civil parish in Portugal

- Civil parish
- Location in Portugal
- Coordinates: 39.4789°N 8.1886°W
- Country: Portugal
- Region: Centro
- Municipality: Abrantes
- Disbanded: 2013

Area
  - Total: 24.06 km^{2} (9.29 sq mi)

Population (2011)
  - Total: 3,884
  - Density: 160/km^{2} (420/sq mi)
- Time zone: UTC+00:00 (WET)
  - Summer (DST): UTC+01:00 (WEST)
- Postal code: 2200-074
- Patron: Nossa Senhora do Rósario

Alferrarede is a town and a former freguesia ("civil parish"), located in the municipality of Abrantes, in Santarém District, Portugal. In 2013, the parish merged into the new parish Abrantes (São Vicente e São João) e Alferrarede. The population in 2011 was 3,884, in an area of 24.06 km^{2}.

== History ==
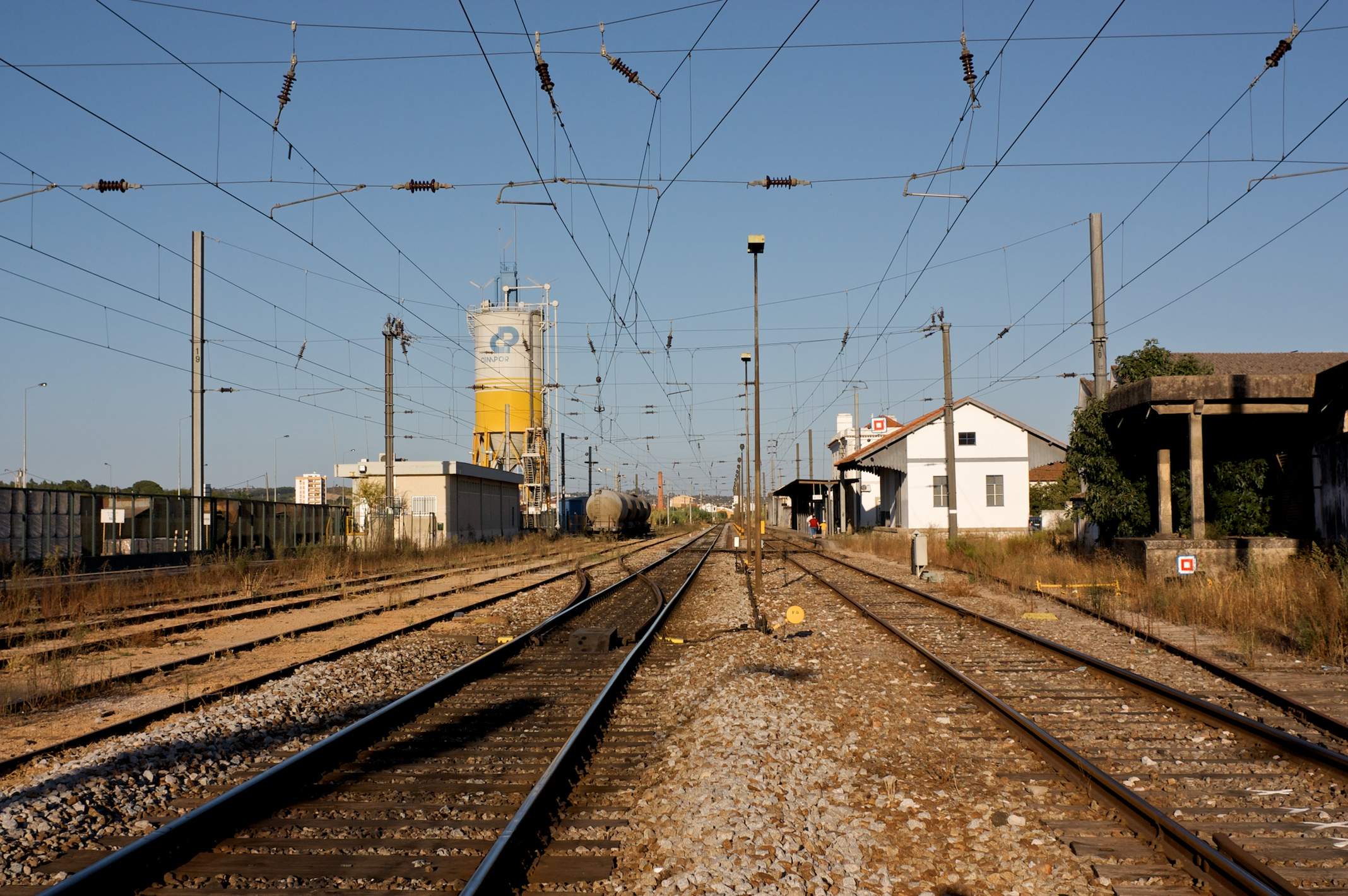
The main railway station in Alferrarede

The toponymic name Alferrarede was derived from the Latin gypseptum or ferratum referring to iron mines. As established by the local historical society and municipal chamber, which indicated that there existed some mines in these sites, officially registered; although, to this date, there have been no signs or remnants of mines in the region.

== Geography ==
Located near the centre of the municipality, Alferrarede was neighbors with the municipality of Sardoal (in the northeast), and the parishes of Mouriscas (in the east), Pego (in the southeast), São João (in the southwest) and São Vicente (in the west). The right margin of the Tagus River make frontier with Alferrarede and Pego.

== Architecture ==
=== Civic ===
- Fonte de São José
- Quinta do Bom Sucesso (English: Manor of Good Success), also referred to as the Quinta da Família Almeida (English: Manor of the Almeida Family) or Quinta da família Almeida Barberino (English: Manor of the Almeida Barberino Family); this manor home is registered to include the mansion itself (constructed in the 17th century), the park and the Torre da Marquesa (English: Tower of the Maquesa), also referred to as the Alferrarede Castle.
