= Castle of Abrantes =

Castle in Abrantes, Santarém, Ribatejo, Portugal

- Castelo de Abrantes
- Santarém, Médio Tejo, Centro in Portugal
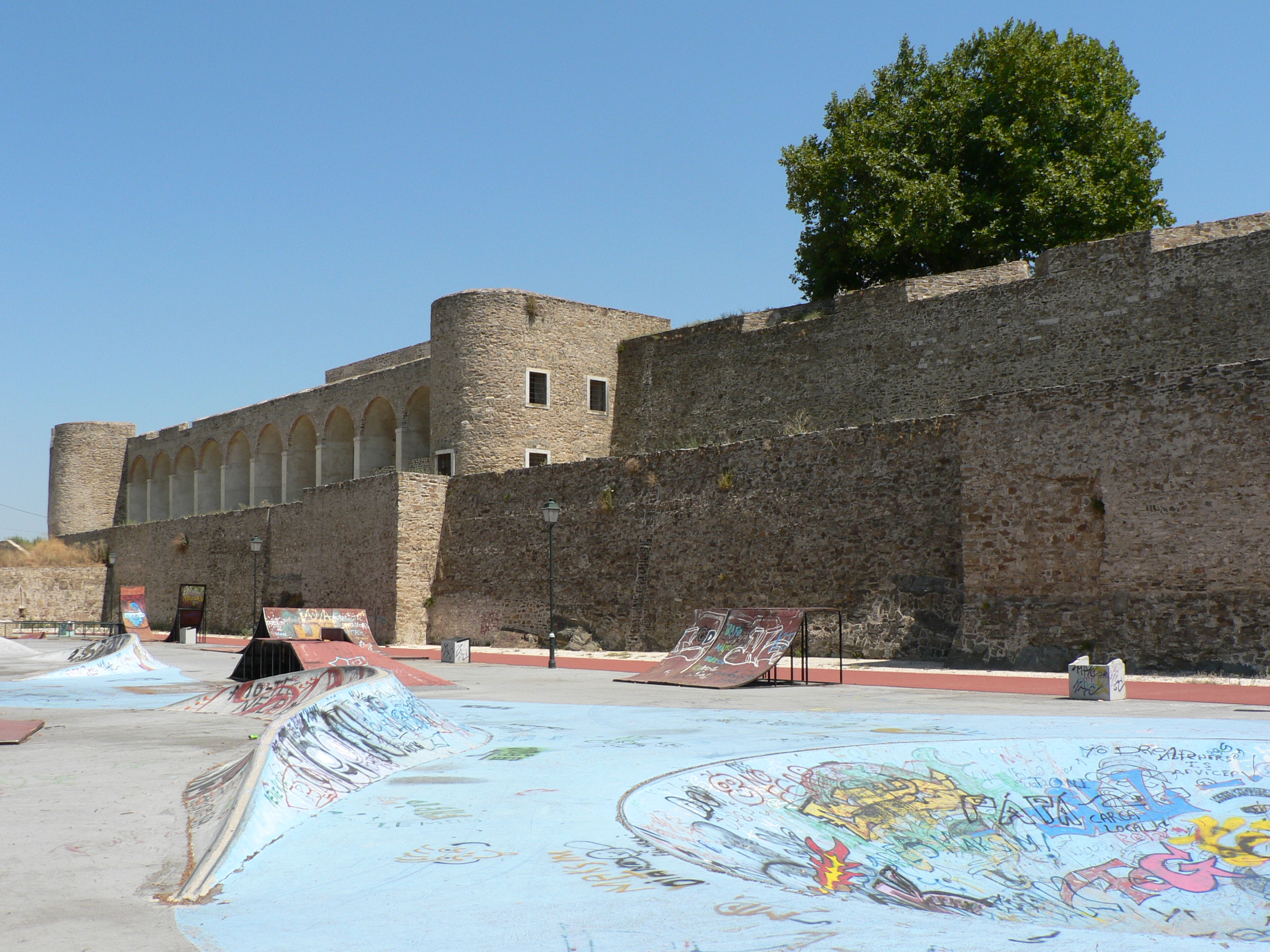
- Modern meets classic: the northwestern colonnade located alongside a skatepark

Site information
- Type: Castle
- Owner: Portuguese Republic
- Open to the public: Public

Location
- Coordinates: 39°27′52.05″N 8°11′41.35″W

Site history
- Built: 130 BC

The Castle of Abrantes (Portuguese: Fortaleza de Abrantes) overlooks the city of Abrantes, in the municipality of Abrantes in the district of Santarém, Ribatejo, divided between the two civil parishes of São João and São Vicente. It was part of the Reconquista fortifications that made up the Linha do Tejo (English: Tagus Line), a line of castles and outposts during the Middle Ages, recently integrated into a tourist region called the Região de Turismo dos Templários (English: Tourist Region of the Templars).

== History ==
The area of the Abrantes Castle was at one time occupied by a Lusitanian castro structure. It was conquered during the Roman invasion of the peninsula around 130 BC by Consul Decimus Junius Brutus, and occupied for a time by Roman legions after Brutus expanded and remodelled it. Successive invasions by Alans (411), Visigoths (492) and Moors (716) further indicated the strategic importance of this site, justifying the establishment of a permanent military garrison. However, the area and its river did not constitute an important link between the settlements of the Iberian Peninsula until the 12th century.

During the Christian Reconquista (English: Re-conquest), the settlement in the area of Abrantes was taken from the Moors by forces in the service of Afonso Henriques (1112-1185), who restructured the defences of the site to attract settlers into the region. He granted the lands to the Order of Santiago (1172) so that they could watch over and assist pilgrims on the Way of Saint James. Later, it was incorporated into the Linha do Tejo (English: Tagus Line) that the Knights Templar established to control and maintain the lands reconquered from the Muslims. The castle outpost, as well as the castles of Almourol, Castelo Branco, Monsanto, Pombal, Tomar, Torres Novas and Zêzere formed a defensive barrier of garrisons along the middle course of the Tagus River.

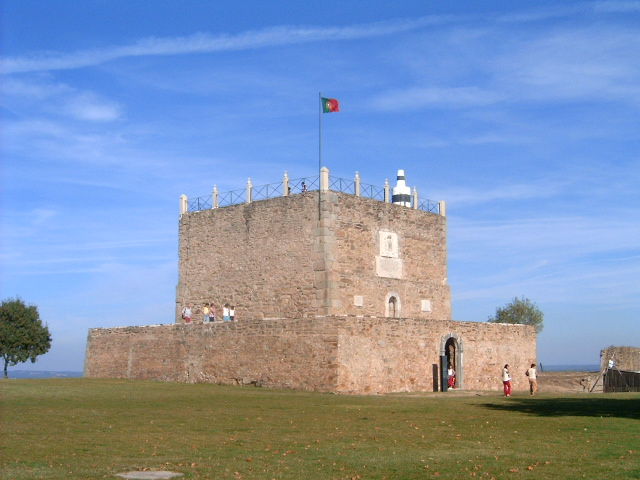
The detention block, located in the central plan of the Castle in a commons used as a military square during the 18th century

As part of this line, Abrantes was able to resist the forces of the Almohad Caliphate under the command of Moroccan Abem Jacob (1179), who retreated after suffering many deaths. Abrantes was rewarded for its heroic resistance by receiving a foral in 1179 and was rebuilt. During the reign of Sancho I (1185-1211), a new attack from the Almoáda, under the command of Caliph Abu Yusuf Ya'qub al-Mansur, was successful in 1191 in retaking all the Christian conquests in the territories south of the Tagus, with the exception of Évora. In 1250, Afonso III (1248-1279) initiated a strengthening of the defences of the castle, including the construction of the prison block and an expansion of the walls, which was brought to completion between 1300 and 1303 in the reign of his successor Dinis. Afonso III donated the village of Abrantes to his wife, Queen Elizabeth of Portugal, beginning a tradition of royal patronage by the Queens of Portugal.

During the Portuguese Interregnum Abrantes allied itself with the Master of Aviz, and fought the forces of Castile in the Battle of Aljubarrota.

A new foral was conferred (1510) during the reign of Manuel I of Portugal (1495-1521). In 1531, the two top floors of the prison block were destroyed by the 1531 Lisbon earthquake.

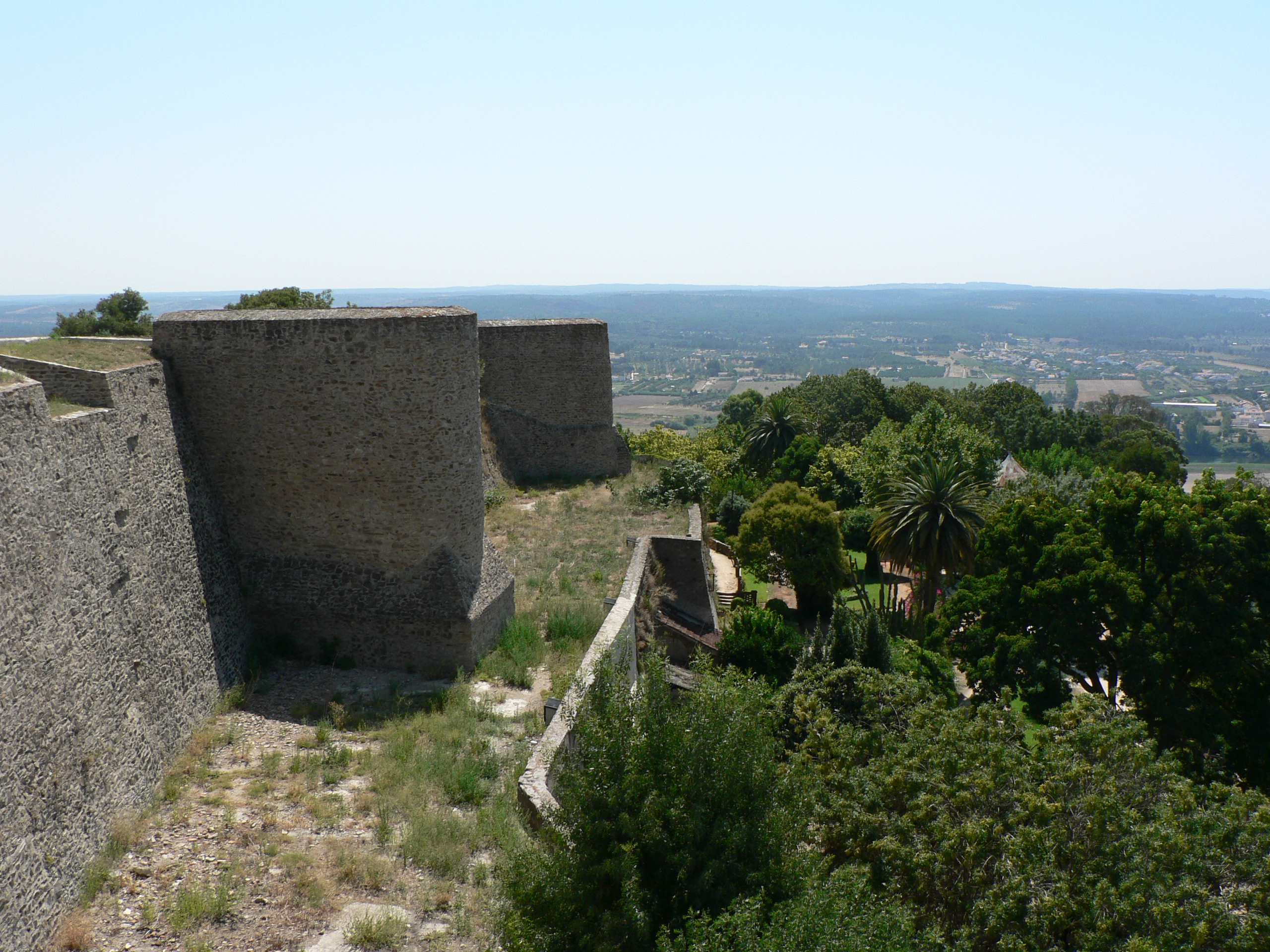
The walls of the Abrantes Castle looking down on the urban settlement of the town

In the second half of the 16th century, the Abrantes Castle entered into decline, particularly during the 1580 Portuguese succession crisis. In the context of the Portuguese Restoration War, in the last quarter of the 17th century, Peter II determined that the castle and its settlement should be reconstructed into a medieval castle-keep, in the style of Vauban. To this end, the medieval walls were lowered and strengthened, and two secondary walls were constructed within the bastions in 1704. By this process of remodelling, which included the construction of the palace of the Marquess of Abrantes (by Rodrigo de Almeida e Meneses, 1st Marquess of Abrantes), making the fortress a key to the Province of Estremadura. Similar expansions were accomplished in 1731 by the military engineer Engeleer, with the construction of the bastions and renovation of the already existing walls.

In the 18th century, the castle's installations were adapted for use as a garrison of a regiment of Royal Cavalry. Between 1792 and 1799, the same quarters were expanded and occupied by a legion commanded by the Marquess of Alorna. By the beginning of the 19th century, during the Peninsular War the castle and town underwent, on two occasions, the passage of Napoleonic troops into Portugal:

- on 22 November 1807, it was occupied by troops under the command of Jean-Andoche Junot, who took the title of Duke of Abrantes (March 1808);
- in October 1810 it was reoccupied, after the rout of French troops at the Lines of Torres Vedras, under the command of Marshall André Masséna.

In 1809, the fortifications were improved under engineer Manuel de Sousa Ramos, just before they were occupied by Masséna's forces, who destroyed the palace of the Marquess of Abrantes. Afterwards, the castle installations were de-activated as quarters, and converted to a military presidio, resulting in alterations to its structure.

In 1860 repairs were made at the prison block, reinforced by an exterior wall, ordered built by the Baron of Batalhã.

In the middle of the 20th century, the castle's buildings and structures were classified as an Imóvel de Interesse Público (Property of Public Interest) by decree (July 1957) by the Direcção-Geral dos Edifícios e Monumentos Nacionais (DGEMN) (General-Directorate for Buildings and National Monuments). At the end of the 1960s, remodelling projects were advanced to consolidate and restore the walls of the castle, which continued until the 1970s (and included the partial reconstruction of the detention block).

On 1 June 1992, the fort came under the authority of the Instituto Português do Patromónio Arquitectónico (IPPAR), forerunner of the Instituto de Gestão do Património Arquitectónico e Arqueológico (Decree 106F/92).

In 2002, a program was established to maintain and promote the structure, which included a public tender to renovate the building; the castle was closed between 2002 and 2004 to enable renovations to be carried out. After these were concluded, the castle was formally re-inaugurated on 18 April 2004.

== Architecture ==
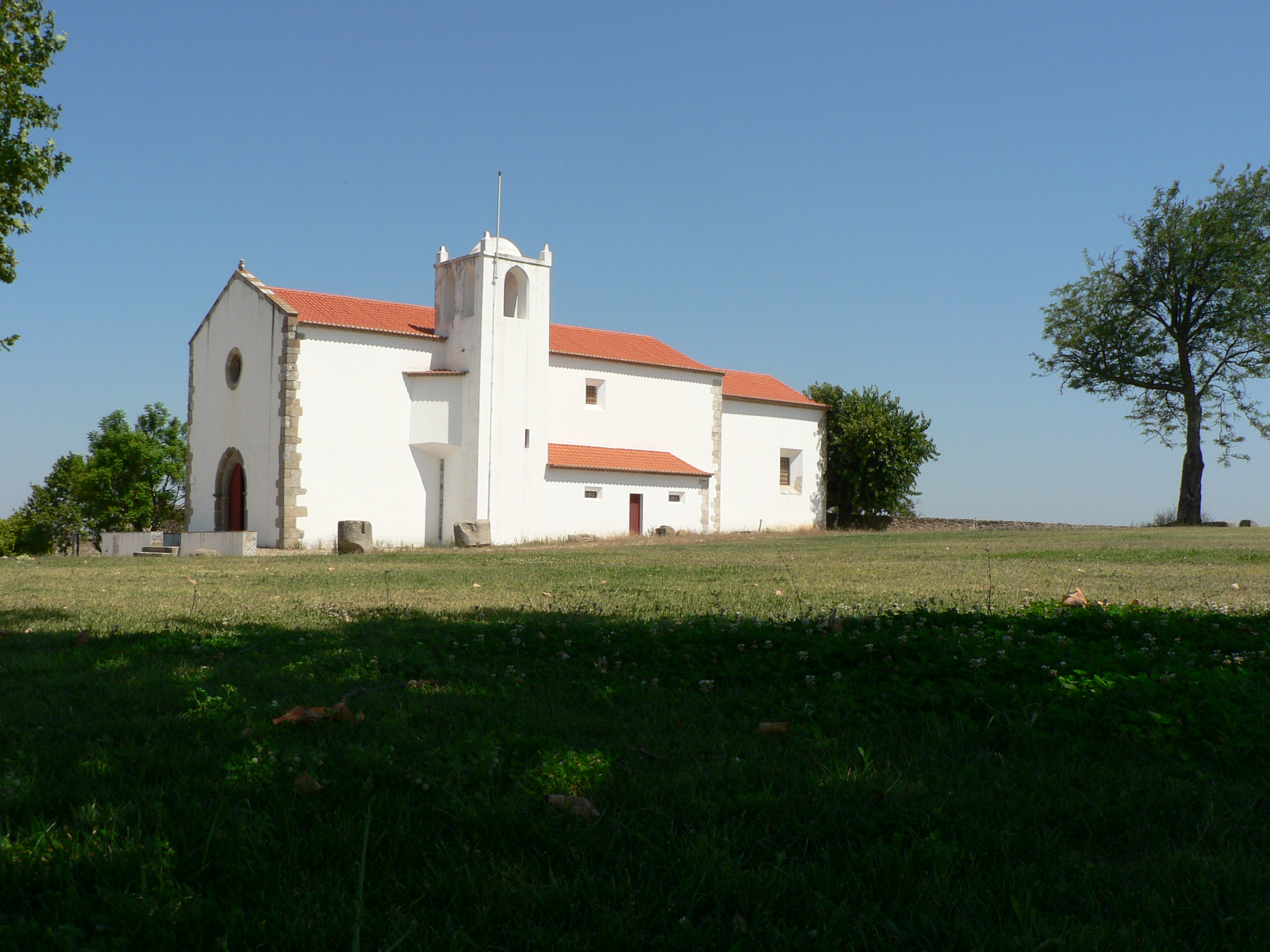
The ancient church of Santa Maria do Castelo, located in a central level area within the castle walls

The Castle has an imposing position on the right margin of the Tagus River, surmounting a hilltop overlooking the town and local landscape. It is a characteristic hilltop fortification, located on a 197-metre high plateau dominating the town, designed to take advantage of the steep incline of the northeast escarpment. The southern, southeastern and eastern portions of the castle are reinforced by bastions and curtain walls. In addition to the isolated detention and block (in the centre of the grounds), the eastern end of the castle are dominated by the Paços do Marquis, Paços dos Condes and the church of the Santa Maria do Castelo.

The military fort, like other medieval forts, was the centre of power and refuge in case of attack; the community lived outside the walls, in the almedina, a space that includes the two major churches of São Vicente and São João.

The castle is constructed from masonry rock in an irregular polygonal form surmounting a rocky cliff face with steep vertical walls. Originally of Romanesque architecture, it took on aspects of Gothic architecture through successive additions, remodelling and rebuilding after the 13th century. The only remnants of the austere medieval castle are the detention block, the weapons portico (on the north-east angle) and the parapet for lookouts that commanded panoramic views of the region.

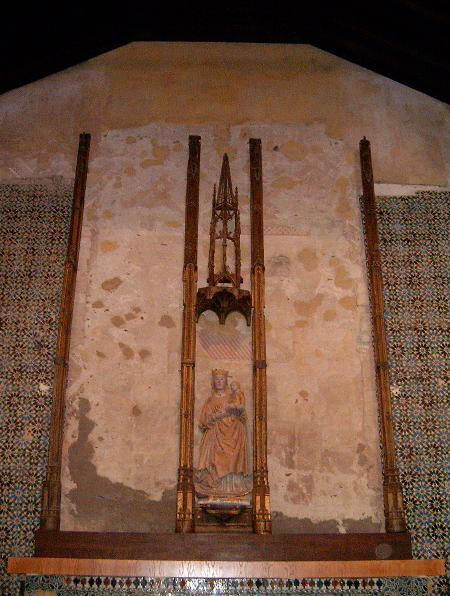
Interior altar of the small church of Santa Maria do Castelo

The rectangular detention block in the middle of the castle commons originally had three levels, but the two upper levels were destroyed in the 1531 earthquake. Remodelling completed in the 19th century took from the character of the façade.

The first line of walls are reinforced by cylindrical towers and interrupted by vertical openings. The castle's bastions, completed in the 18th century, are distributed around the older part of the settlement of Abrantes.

The old military square, and on the western extent of the castle, are the ruins of the old Paço dos Condes de Abrantes(English: Residence of the Counts of Abrantes). Begun in 1530, by the sheriff of the vila, Diogo Fernandes de Almeida, it was designed to take advantage of the wall to reinforce the structure. The Paços, marked by grandiose architectural elements in the Baroque style, was substantially modified in the 18th century by the first Marquis of Abrantes, Rodrigo Anes de Sá Almeida e Menezes. Of these elements the loggia, consisting of an arcade of 11 perfect spans, aligned symmetrically on two cylindrical tiers, are the most distinctive part of the Abrantes complex.

In the interior, the Church of Santa Maria do Castelo, in the Gothic style has been converted into a museum exhibiting a collection of Roman sculpture, funerary artefacts from the 15th and 16th century, as well as azulejos.
