= Martinchel =

Civil parish in Portugal

- Civil parish
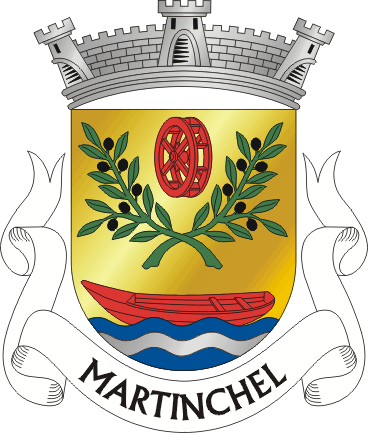
- Coat of arms

- Location in Portugal
- Coordinates: 39.537°N 8.311°W
- Country: Portugal
- Region: Oeste e Vale do Tejo
- Intermunic. comm.: Médio Tejo
- District: Santarém
- Municipality: Abrantes

Area
  - Total: 17.07 km^{2} (6.59 sq mi)

Population (2011)
  - Total: 604
  - Density: 35.4/km^{2} (91.6/sq mi)
- Time zone: UTC+00:00 (WET)
  - Summer (DST): UTC+01:00 (WEST)

Martinchel is a Portuguese freguesia ("civil parish"), located in Abrantes municipality, in Santarém District. The population in 2011 was 604, in an area of 17.07 km^{2} (6.59 sq mi).
