= Pego =

Pego may refer to:

- Pego (Abrantes), a Portuguese parish, located in the municipality of Abrantes
- Pego, Alicante, a Spanish municipality located in the province of Alicante
