= Bemposta =

Bemposta may refer to:

- Bemposta (Abrantes), a parish in the municipality of Abrantes, Portugal
- Bemposta Palace, a palace in Lisbon
- Bemposta (Penamacor), a parish in the municipality of Penamacor, Portugal
- Bemposta (Mogadouro), a parish in the municipality of Mogadouro, Portugal
