= Bemposta (Abrantes) =

Civil parish in Portugal

- Civil parish
- Location in Portugal
- Coordinates: 39.351°N 8.140°W
- Country: Portugal
- Region: Oeste e Vale do Tejo
- Intermunic. comm.: Médio Tejo
- District: Santarém
- Municipality: Abrantes

Area
  - Total: 187.45 km^{2} (72.37 sq mi)

Population (2011)
  - Total: 1,795
  - Density: 9.6/km^{2} (25/sq mi)
- Time zone: UTC+00:00 (WET)
  - Summer (DST): UTC+01:00 (WEST)

Bemposta is a Portuguese freguesia ("civil parish"), located in the municipality of Abrantes, in Santarém District. The population in 2011 was 1,795, in an area of 187.45 km^{2}. The parish is by far the largest in the municipality, but also the least densely populated.
