= São Miguel do Rio Torto e Rossio ao Sul do Tejo =

Civil parish in Portugal

- Civil parish
- Location in Portugal
- Coordinates: 39.43°N 8.21°W
- Country: Portugal
- Region: Oeste e Vale do Tejo
- Intermunic. comm.: Médio Tejo
- District: Santarém
- Municipality: Abrantes

Area
  - Total: 58.94 km^{2} (22.76 sq mi)

Population (2011)
  - Total: 4,881
  - Density: 83/km^{2} (210/sq mi)
- Time zone: UTC+00:00 (WET)
  - Summer (DST): UTC+01:00 (WEST)

União das Freguesias de São Miguel do Rio Torto e Rossio ao Sul do Tejo is a freguesia ("civil parish") in the municipality of Abrantes, Portugal. It was formed in 2013 by the merger of the former freguesias of São Miguel do Rio Torto and Rossio ao Sul do Tejo. The population in 2011 was 4,881, in an area of 58.94 km². It is situated on the left, southern bank of the Tagus River.
