= Rio de Moinhos (Abrantes) =

Civil parish in Portugal

- Civil parish
- Location in Portugal
- Coordinates: 39.477°N 8.241°W
- Country: Portugal
- Region: Oeste e Vale do Tejo
- Intermunic. comm.: Médio Tejo
- District: Santarém
- Municipality: Abrantes

Area
  - Total: 20.03 km^{2} (7.73 sq mi)

Population (2011)
  - Total: 1,202
  - Density: 60.01/km^{2} (155.4/sq mi)
- Time zone: UTC+00:00 (WET)
  - Summer (DST): UTC+01:00 (WEST)

Rio de Moinhos is a freguesia ("civil parish") in the Portuguese municipality of Abrantes, in the district of Santarém. The population in 2011 was 1,202, in an area of 20.03 square kilometres (7.73 mi^{2}).

== History ==
Once called Ribeira dos Moinhos, it got its name from the number of watermills and windmills that line the watercourse, along an 8 kilometres (5.0 mi) fertile river valley that flows to the Tagus River.

It is unclear when the parish was established, although it is generally assumed that the first inhabitants were fishermen.

== Economy ==
The region is supported by activities that include agriculture, commerce (charcutaria, grocery stores, carpentry shops, civil construction firms, and automobile dealerships), services, and industry (woodmilling and automobiles).

A factory in Tramagal employs many of the people of Rio de Moinhos.

== Culture ==
There are various associations that are tied to social, cultural, or economic activities in the parish: the Associação de Moradores de Amoreira, the Associação de Caçadores, the Junta de Agricultores, the Centro de Apoio a Idosos da freguesia de Rio de Moinhos, the Centro Cultural e Desportivo de Amoreira, the Conferência de São Vicente de Paulo, the Sociedade Filarmónica de Educação e Beneficência Riomoinhense (with a history of two hundred years of service), the Casa do Povo de Rio de Moinhos, the folk-singing group "Os Moleiros" (from the same Casa do Povo), the Comissão de melhoramentos da Pucariça and the Associação Juvenil Remoinhos d'Água.

The parish is known for Tigeladas, the Broas de mel, the Ferradura cakes, and many of the types of charcutaria (such as Chouriço, Morcela, Farinheira, and Moura) that are typical of the dinner services.

== Education ==
In total, approximately 85 students frequent the two levels of public education (pre-school and basic primary school). Pre-school activities are available in Amoreira, Rio de Moinhos, and Pucariça (receiving approximately 46 children); the remaining are distributed to the primary school. There are four children's parks in the community.

== Sport ==
Two organizations are responsible for organizing sports in the parish: the Centro de Cultura e Desporto de Amoreira and Casa do Povo de Rio de Moinhos. The population is supported by two football fields: the Ringue de Futebol de Salão and the covered Polidesportivo.
