= Carvalhal (Abrantes) =

Civil parish in Portugal

- Civil parish
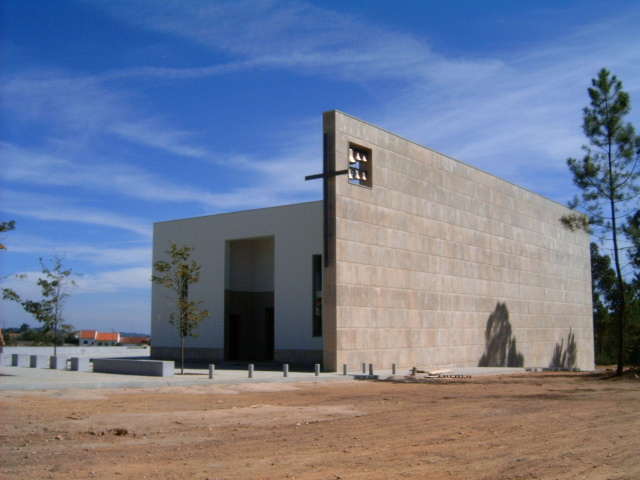
- Church of Carvalhal

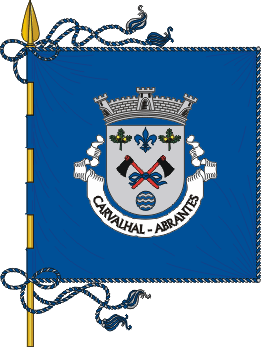
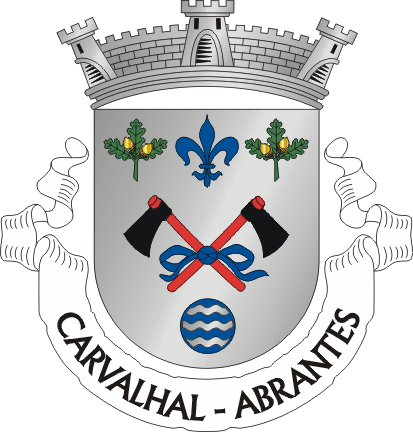
- Flag Coat of arms

- Location in Portugal
- Coordinates: 39.565°N 8.193°W
- Country: Portugal
- Region: Oeste e Vale do Tejo
- Intermunic. comm.: Médio Tejo
- District: Santarém
- Municipality: Abrantes

Area
  - Total: 17.54 km^{2} (6.77 sq mi)

Population (2011)
  - Total: 722
  - Density: 41.2/km^{2} (107/sq mi)
- Time zone: UTC+00:00 (WET)
  - Summer (DST): UTC+01:00 (WEST)

Carvalhal is a Portuguese freguesia ("civil parish"), located in Abrantes Municipality, in Santarém District. The population in 2011 was 722, in an area of 17.54 km^{2}. Once, the parish population was composed by a large number of woodcutters, due to its location in a densely forested area. However, since the 1980s, the economic importance of the forest has been declining. The zone is usually affected by several wildfires during the summer.
