= Pego, Portugal =

Civil parish in Portugal

Pego
- Civil parish
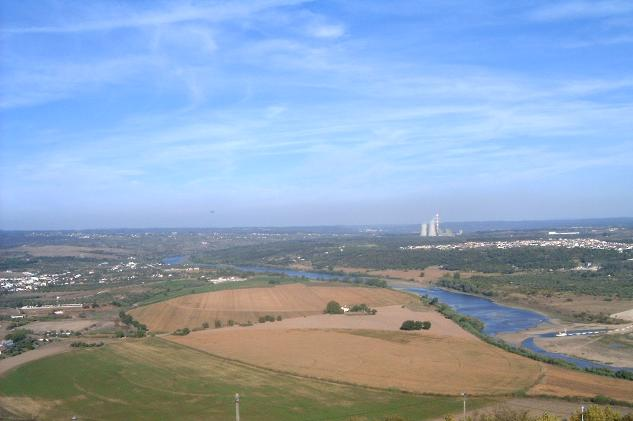

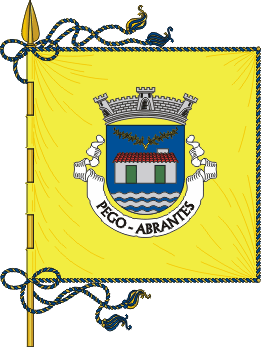
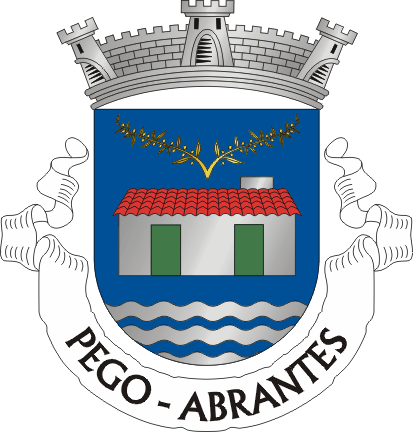
- Flag Coat of arms

- Location in Portugal
- Coordinates: 39.462°N 8.149°W
- Country: Portugal
- Region: Oeste e Vale do Tejo
- Intermunic. comm.: Médio Tejo
- District: Santarém
- Municipality: Abrantes

Area
  - Total: 36.05 km^{2} (13.92 sq mi)

Population (2011)
  - Total: 2,431
  - Density: 67.43/km^{2} (174.7/sq mi)
- Time zone: UTC+00:00 (WET)
  - Summer (DST): UTC+01:00 (WEST)
- Postal code: 2205
- Area code: 241
- Patron: Santa Luzia

Pego is a civil parish (freguesia) in the municipality (concelho) of Abrantes, in the historic Portuguese district of Santarém. The population in 2011 was 2,431, in an area of 36.05 square kilometres (13.92 sq mi).

== History ==
The parish, one of the older parishes in the municipality, was already identified in the records of that period, dating to 1332.

== Geography ==
Pego is situated in the centre of the municipality of Abrantes; one of the three parishes that do not front other municipalities within Abrantes. Its neighbours include the parishes of Mouriscas (in the northeast); Concavada (in the east); São Facundo and São Miguel do Rio Torto (to the south), Rossio (to the west) and Alferrarede (in the northwest).

Leaving the main city of Abrantes, towards Portalgre on the EN118, following the left margin of the Tagus, intersects the civil parish of Pego. The road leads along the Ribeira de Coalhos to a small plateau with several small low-rise homes: the first indications of a small settled community.

== Architecture ==
=== Civic ===
- Estate of Coalhos (Quinta dos Coalhos)
- Estate of Torre (Quinta da Torre)
- House of Coalhos (Casa dos Coalhos)
- House of Pego (Casa do Pego)
- Lagar of Pego (Lagar do Pego)
- Residence Rosado Gonçalves (Vivenda Rosado Gonçalves)
- Windmill of Pego (Moinho de vento do Pego)

=== Religious ===
- Chapel of Nossa Senhora dos Aflitos (Capela de Nossa Senhora dos Aflitos)
- Church of Santa Luzia (Igreja Paroquial de Pego/Igreja de Santa Luzia)
