= Vila Nova da Barquinha =

- Municipality
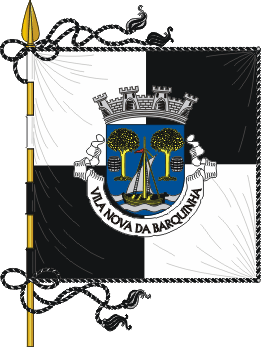
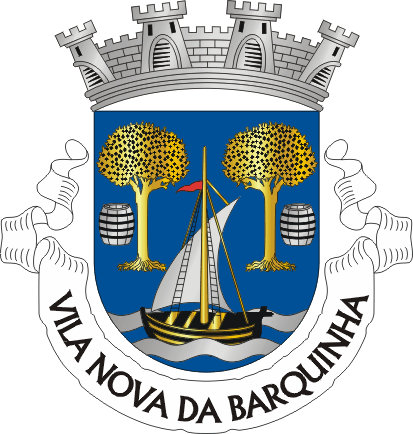
- Flag Coat of arms
- Interactive map of Vila Nova da Barquinha
- Coordinates: 39°27′N 8°26′W
- Country: Portugal
- Region: Oeste e Vale do Tejo
- Intermunic. comm.: Médio Tejo
- District: Santarém
- Parishes: 4

Government
  - President: Manuel Mourato (PS)

Area
  - Total: 49.53 km^{2} (19.12 sq mi)

Population (2011)
  - Total: 7,322
  - Density: 147.8/km^{2} (382.9/sq mi)
- Time zone: UTC+00:00 (WET)
  - Summer (DST): UTC+01:00 (WEST)
- Local holiday: Saint Anthony; June 13
- Website: www.cm-vnbarquinha.pt

Vila Nova da Barquinha (European Portuguese pronunciation: [ˈvilɐ ˈnɔvɐ ðɐ βɐɾˈkiɲɐ]) is a municipality in the district of Santarém in Portugal. The population in 2011 was 7,322, in an area of 49.53 km^{2}. The village of Vila Nova da Barquinha, which is the seat of the municipality, has about 3500 inhabitants.

The present Mayor is Manuel Mourato, elected by the Socialist Party. The municipal holiday is June 13.

== History and sights ==
Although some villages of Vila Nova da Barquinha are ancient, the development of the region is strongly related to the Reconquista period, when the river Tagus, which flows through the South of the municipality, was the border between the dominions of Christians and Moors. In the 12th century, the defence of this border was in charge of the Knights Templar, who built several castles along the river. One of these is the Castle of Almourol, built by the Master of the Portuguese Templars, Gualdim Pais, in 1171. The picturesque castle is located on an island in the Tagus river and can be visited by boat. Nowadays it is the most visited historical site in Vila Nova da Barquinha.

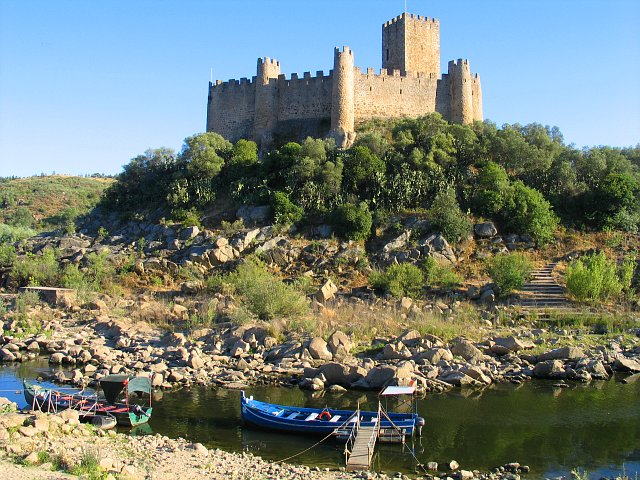
Castle of Almourol.

In the end of the 13th century, when the Reconquista was finished, the importance of the castles of the region declined. The villages along the Tagus then became important fluvial ports for the transport of agricultural goods of the region to Lisbon. In the 16th century, the port of the village of Tancos became the most important of all, being granted a foral (letter of feudal rights) in 1517 by King Manuel I. From the early 16th century date the main church (matriz) of the village of Atalaia, with a magnificent portal and interior in Renaissance style.

The village of Vila Nova da Barquinha, current seat of the municipality, was created in the 17th century around a fluvial port (hence the name Barquinha = Barca = Boat). In the 18th and 19th centuries the village became the most important in the region, and it was turned into the seat of the municipality in 1836. The importance of the river in the development of the municipality is reflected in its coat-of-arms, which shows the picture of a boat. The arrival of the railway system in Portugal eventually led to the decadence of the fluvial commerce of the municipality.

== Climate ==
The municipality of Vila Nova da Barquinha has a hot-summer Mediterranean climate with mild, rainy winters and hot, dry summers.

Climate data for Tancos (Aerial Base), 1951-1980, altitude: 83 m (272 ft)
Month	Jan	Feb	Mar	Apr	May	Jun	Jul	Aug	Sep	Oct	Nov	Dec	Year
Record high °C (°F)	22.6 (72.7)	24.8 (76.6)	29.4 (84.9)	32.2 (90.0)	34.8 (94.6)	41.5 (106.7)	40.6 (105.1)	44.0 (111.2)	41.4 (106.5)	32.6 (90.7)	25.3 (77.5)	23.2 (73.8)	44.0 (111.2)
Mean daily maximum °C (°F)	14.0 (57.2)	15.2 (59.4)	17.2 (63.0)	19.7 (67.5)	22.9 (73.2)	26.6 (79.9)	30.0 (86.0)	30.2 (86.4)	27.9 (82.2)	22.8 (73.0)	17.2 (63.0)	14.1 (57.4)	21.5 (70.7)
Daily mean °C (°F)	9.1 (48.4)	10.3 (50.5)	11.8 (53.2)	14.0 (57.2)	16.9 (62.4)	20.2 (68.4)	22.8 (73.0)	22.9 (73.2)	21.2 (70.2)	17.1 (62.8)	12.1 (53.8)	12.1 (53.8)	15.9 (60.6)
Mean daily minimum °C (°F)	4.2 (39.6)	5.3 (41.5)	6.3 (43.3)	8.3 (46.9)	11.0 (51.8)	13.7 (56.7)	15.6 (60.1)	15.6 (60.1)	14.3 (57.7)	11.4 (52.5)	6.9 (44.4)	4.5 (40.1)	9.8 (49.6)
Record low °C (°F)	−6.5 (20.3)	−4.1 (24.6)	−3.5 (25.7)	−1.0 (30.2)	2.5 (36.5)	5.6 (42.1)	10.0 (50.0)	8.1 (46.6)	7.3 (45.1)	1.2 (34.2)	−5.5 (22.1)	−4.5 (23.9)	−6.5 (20.3)
Average rainfall mm (inches)	80.8 (3.18)	59.3 (2.33)	41.0 (1.61)	59.3 (2.33)	47.8 (1.88)	19.5 (0.77)	5.4 (0.21)	8.5 (0.33)	29.1 (1.15)	95.1 (3.74)	85.5 (3.37)	84.9 (3.34)	616.2 (24.24)
Average rainy days (≥ 0.1 mm)	14.4	13.7	13.4	9.2	8.1	5.0	1.6	1.8	5.9	10.4	12.9	12.7	109.1
Average relative humidity (%)	82	78	71	65	62	60	55	55	61	70	78	81	68
Average afternoon relative humidity (%)	71	66	58	54	52	49	42	40	46	57	66	70	56
Mean monthly sunshine hours	133.2	142.2	197.4	228.8	281.5	284.6	342.9	337.7	241.6	214.4	165.8	146.5	2,716.6
Percentage possible sunshine	52	57	58	63	67	73	77	81	70	57	54	51	63
Source 1: Instituto de Meteorologia
Source 2: Portuguese Environment Agency (precipitation)

== Parishes ==
Administratively, the municipality is divided into 4 civil parishes (freguesias):

- Atalaia
- Praia do Ribatejo
- Tancos
- Vila Nova da Barquinha

== Population ==
Population of Vila Nova da Barquinha municipality (1849 – 2011)
1849	1900	1930	1960	1981	1991	2001	2011
3034	4336	9011	6547	8167	7553	7610	7322

== Notable people ==
- Fernando Cavaleiro (1917–2012) an equestrian, competed at the 1948, 1952 and 1956 Summer Olympics
- Hermínio Martinho (born 1946) a Portuguese agricultural engineer and politician
- José Ribeiro (born 1957) a Portuguese retired footballer with 222 club caps
