= Sardoal =

- Municipality
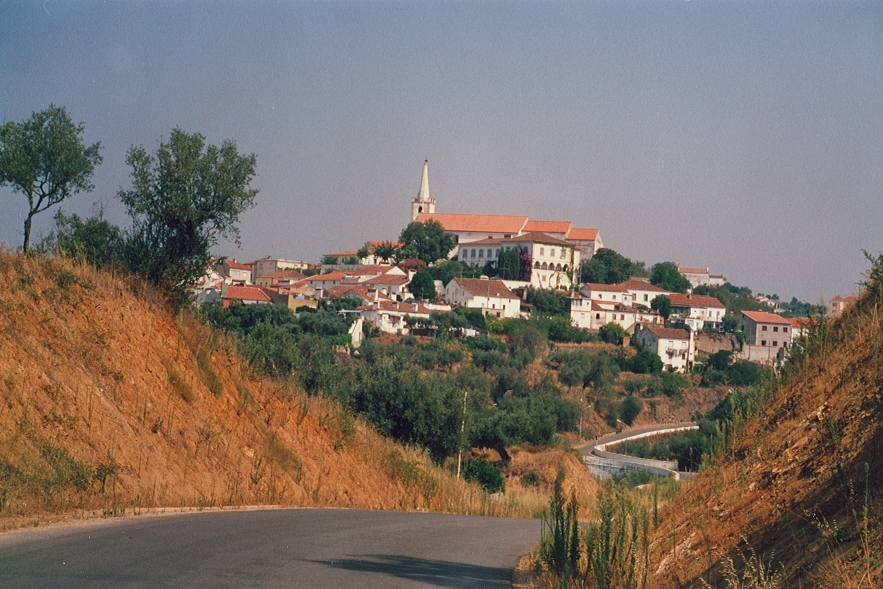
- View of Sardoal

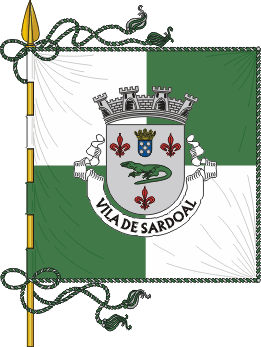
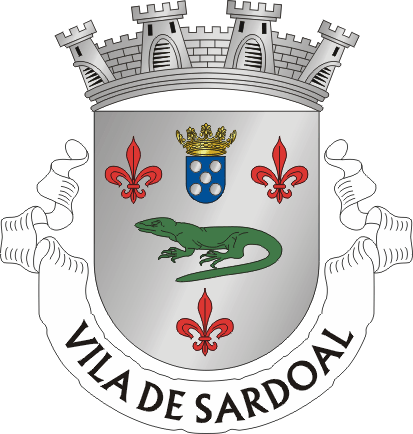
- Flag Coat of arms
- Interactive map of Sardoal
- Coordinates: 39°32′9″N 08°9′40″W
- Country: Portugal
- Region: Oeste e Vale do Tejo
- Intermunic. comm.: Médio Tejo
- District: Santarém
- Parishes: 4

Government
  - President: António Miguel Cabedal Borges (PSD)

Area
  - Total: 92.15 km^{2} (35.58 sq mi)

Population (2011)
  - Total: 3,939
  - Density: 42.75/km^{2} (110.7/sq mi)
- Time zone: UTC+00:00 (WET)
  - Summer (DST): UTC+01:00 (WEST)
- Local holiday: September 22
- Website: www.cm-sardoal.pt

Sardoal (European Portuguese pronunciation: [sɐɾðuˈal]) is a municipality in the district of Santarém in Portugal. The population in 2011 was 3,939, in an area of 92.15 km².

The present Mayor is Miguel Borges, elected by the Social Democratic Party. The municipal holiday is September 22.

== Parishes ==
Administratively, the municipality is divided into 4 civil parishes (freguesias):

- Alcaravela
- Santiago de Montalegre
- Sardoal
- Valhascos
