= Abrantes =

- Municipality
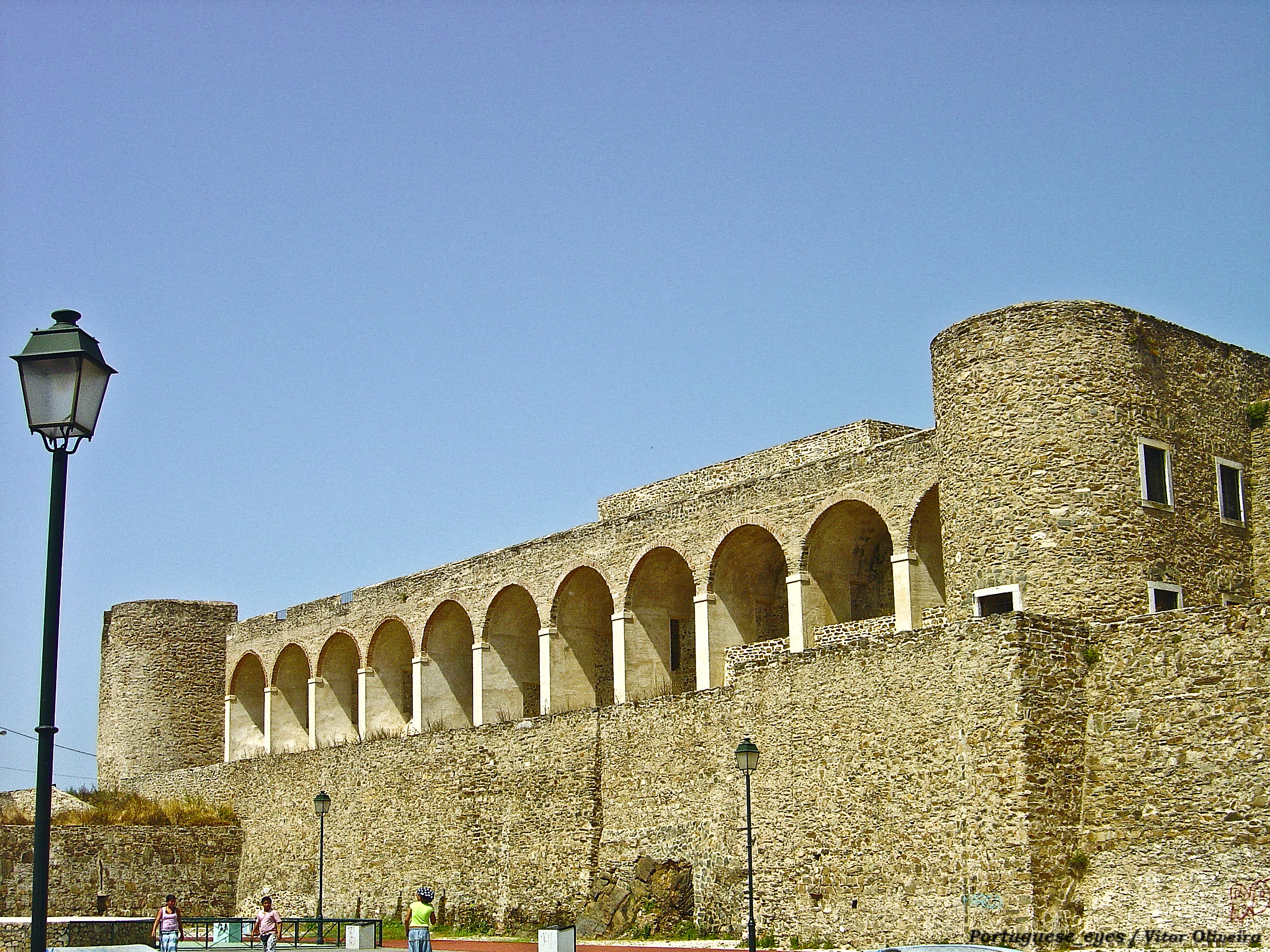
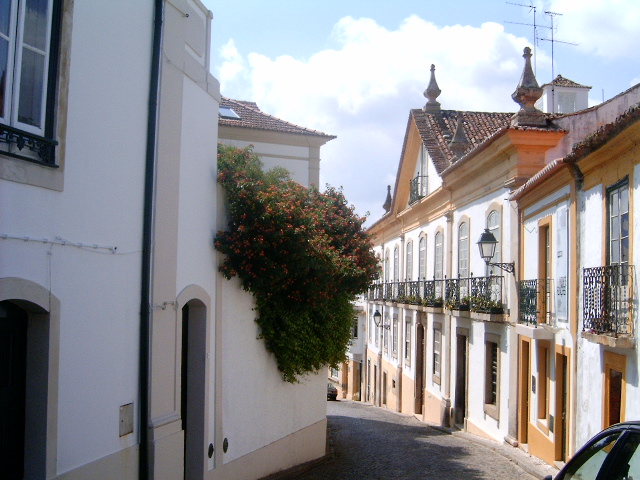
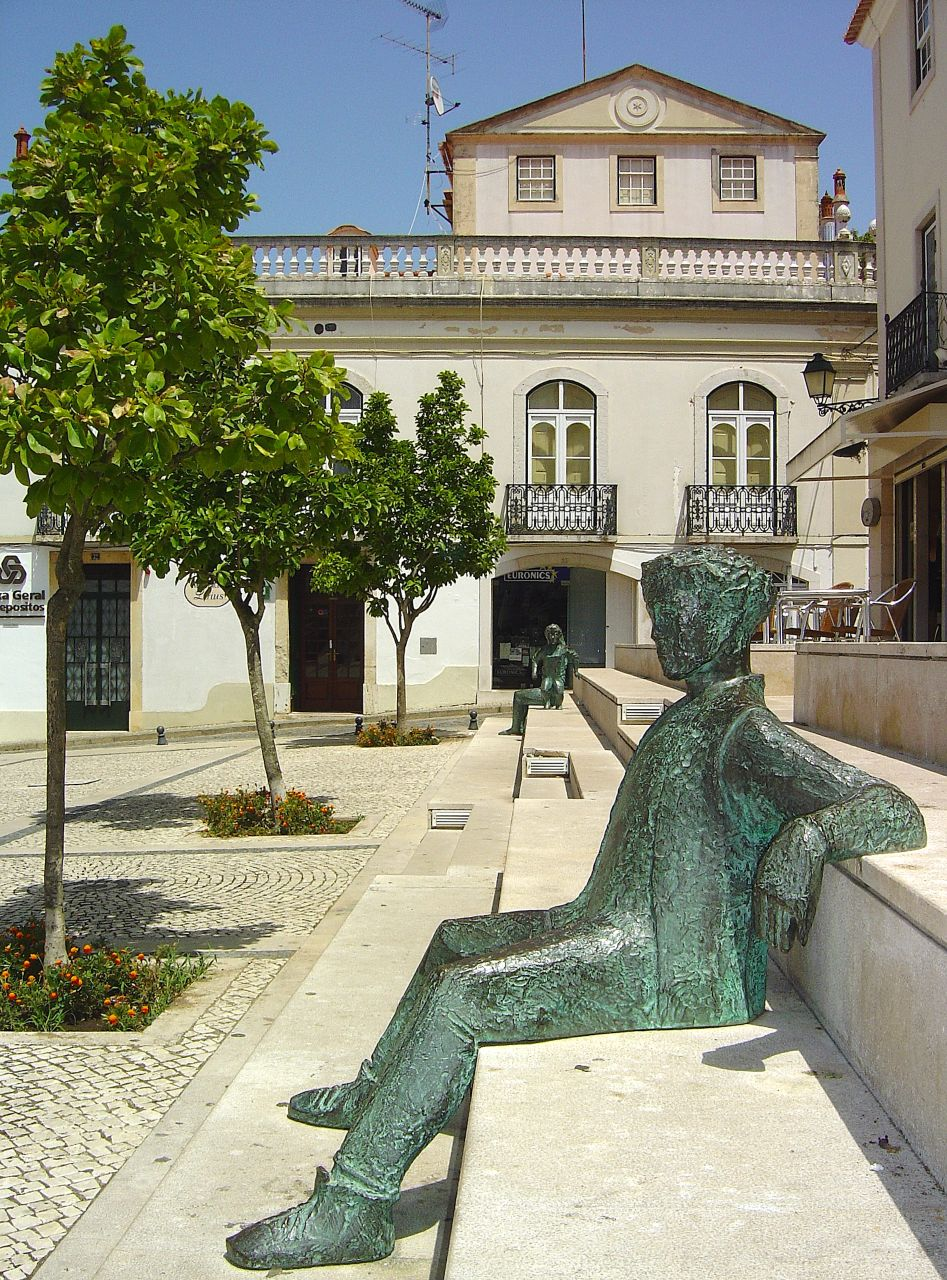
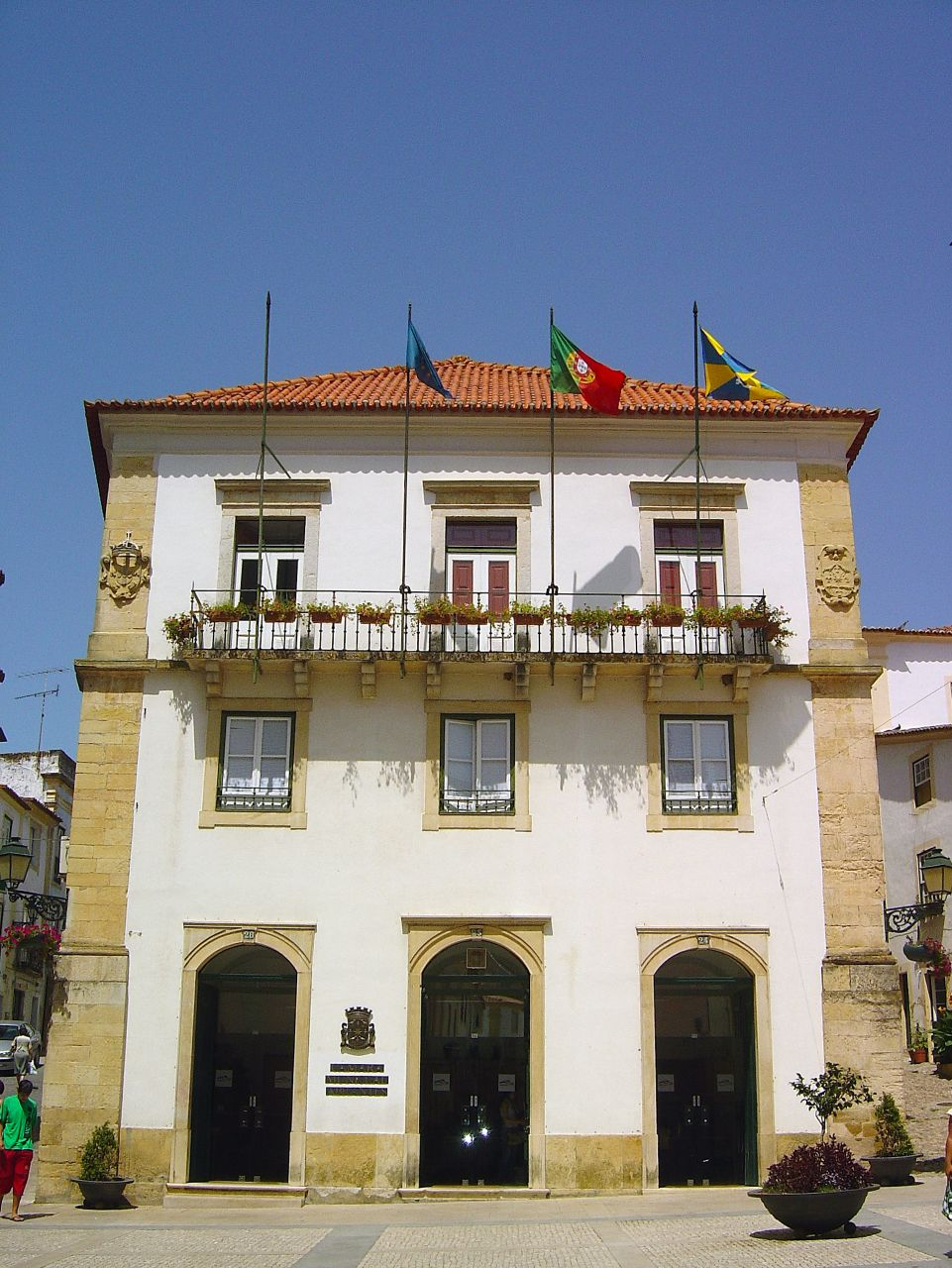
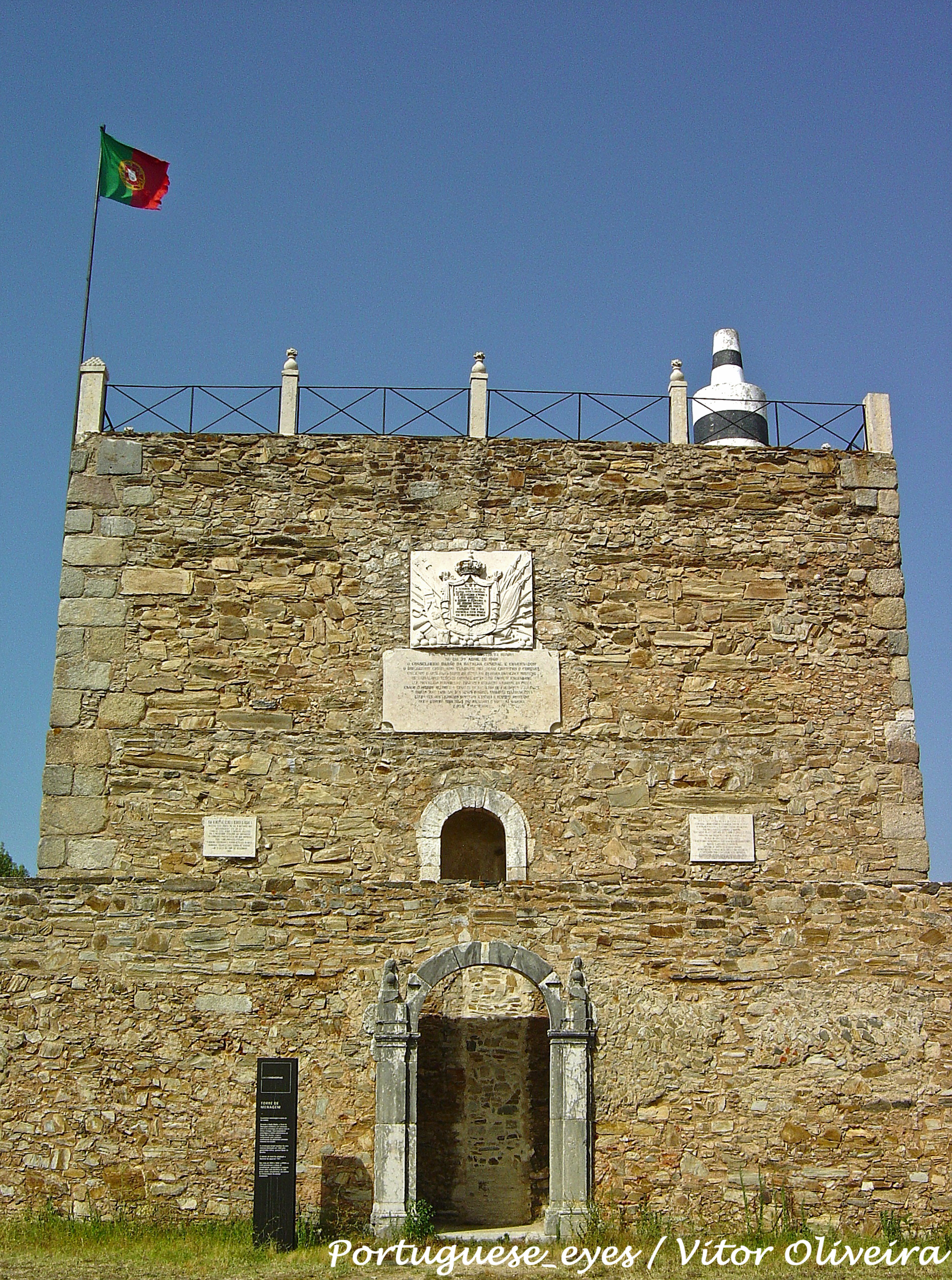
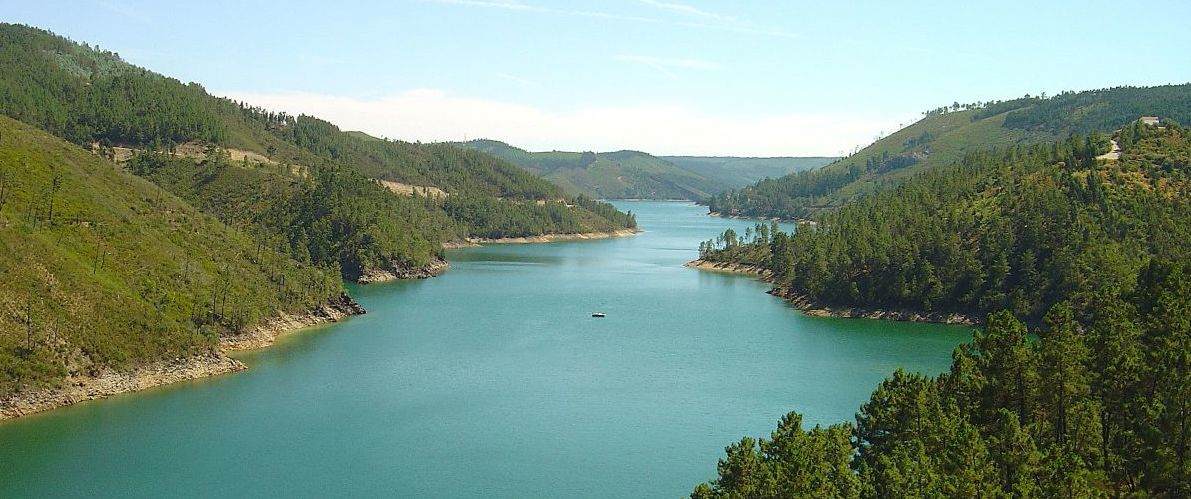

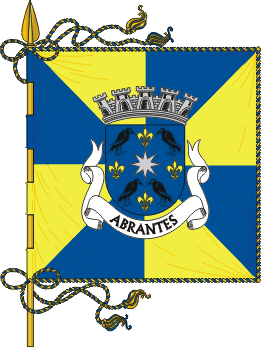
- Flag Coat of arms
- Interactive map of Abrantes
- Location in Portugal
- Coordinates: 39°27′48″N 8°11′51″W
- Country: Portugal
- Region: Oeste e Vale do Tejo
- Intermunic. comm.: Médio Tejo
- District: Santarém
- Parishes: 13

Government
  - President: Manuel Jorge Valamatos (PS)

Area
  - Total: 714.69 km^{2} (275.94 sq mi)
- Highest elevation: 315 m (1,033 ft)
- Lowest elevation: 18 m (59 ft)

Population (2011)
  - Total: 39,325
  - Density: 55.024/km^{2} (142.51/sq mi)
- Time zone: UTC+00:00 (WET)
  - Summer (DST): UTC+01:00 (WEST)
- Postal code: 2200
- Area code: 241
- Patron: São Vicente/São João
- Website: www.cm-abrantes.pt

Abrantes (European Portuguese pronunciation: [ɐˈβɾɐ̃tɨʃ]) is a municipality in the central Médio Tejo subregion of Portugal. The population as of 2011 was 39,325, in an area of 714.69 square kilometres (275.94 sq mi). The municipality includes several parishes divided by the Tagus River, which runs through the middle of the municipality. The urbanized part, the parish of Abrantes (São Vicente e São João) e Alferrarede, located on the north bank of the Tagus, has about 17,000 residents.

== History ==
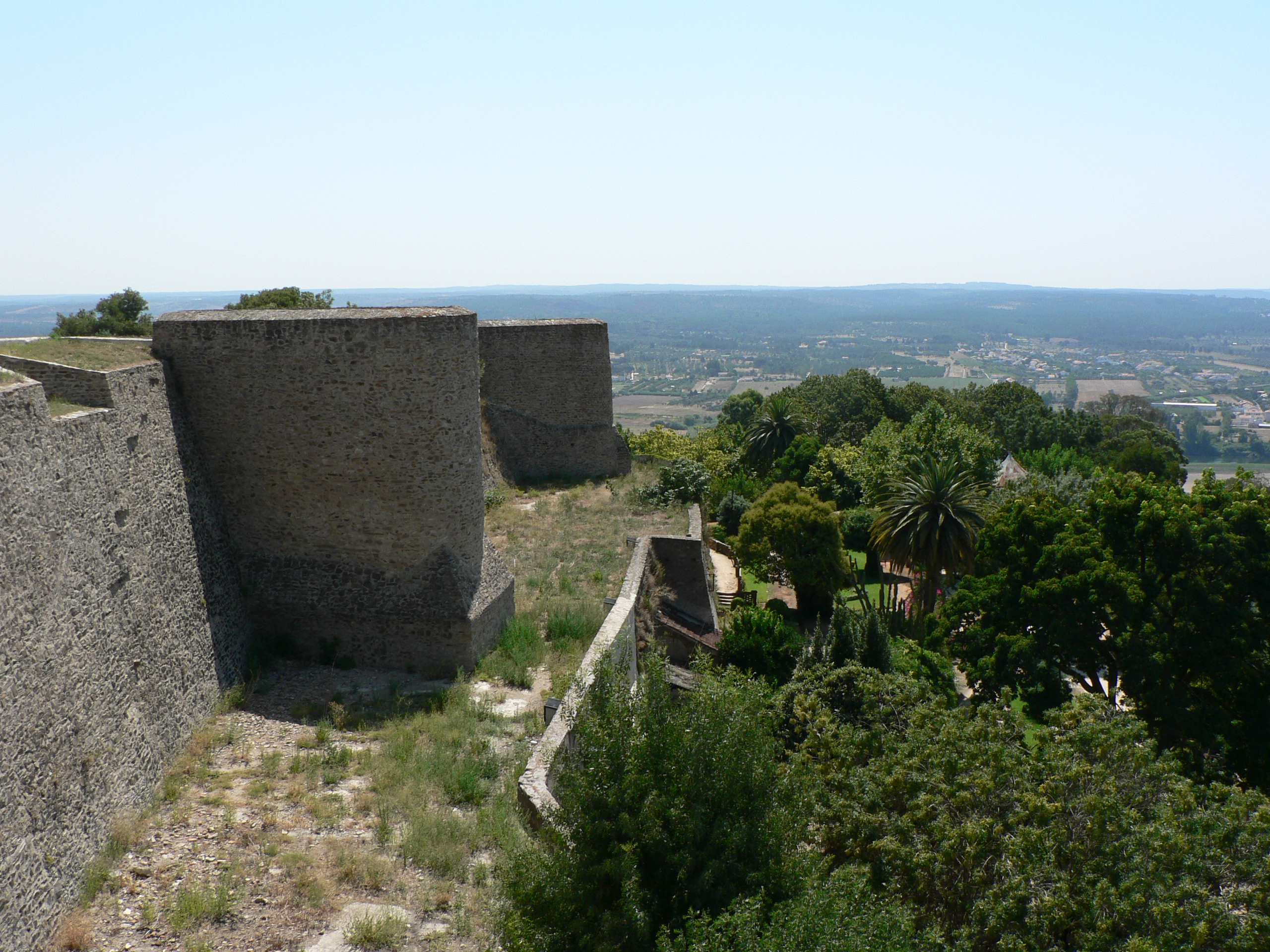
The main ramparts and walls of the Castle of Abrantes, captured from the Moors during the reign of Afonso I of Portugal

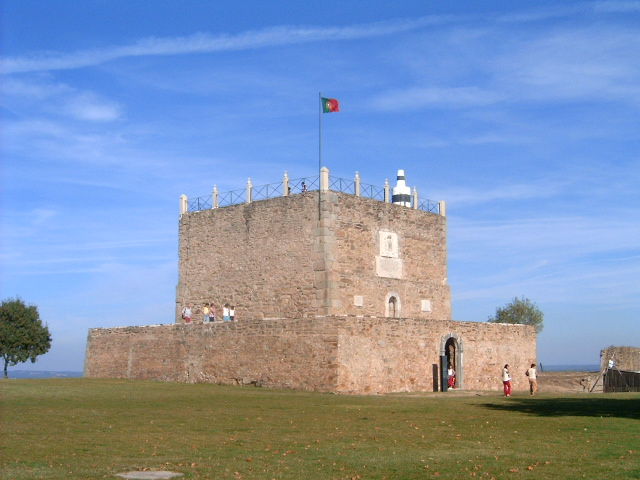
The detention block, used to house prisoners, located within the walls of the Castle of Abrantes

The Celts are believed to have established the first settlement in Abrantes around 300 BC. The name is derived from Latin Aurantes, perhaps referring to deposits of alluvial gold (Latin: aurum) along the Tagus. Similarly, Roman mosaics, coins, the remains of ancient aqueducts, as well as other antiquities, have been discovered in the vicinity of Abrantes.

The village of Abrantes and the Abrantes Castle were conquered from the Moors by Afonso I of Portugal in 1148. After 1172, Abrantes was a military outpost, under the dominion of the Order of Saint James of Compostela. In 1173, the region, including its castle, were donated to the Order of Saint James of the Sword. Around 1290, Pope Nicholas IV released this Order from the jurisdiction of the Castilian grand master of Santiago de Compostela Order in Uclés. It received its municipal foral in 1179, in compensation for its resistance against the Moroccan Abem Jacob. Its creation in 1179, was based on the concelhos perfeitos ("perfect municipality") model; they were formed on the specific day that settlers were invited to populate them; the administrative regime, the organization of the municipal authority and geographic distribution were planned as part of system of populating uninhabited lands, and extending the political influence of the Kingdom. Its geography contributed to the colonization:

Zone of permanent conflicts, where the Reconquista came to pontual conclusion, the colonization of Monte Abrantino was facilitated by the geographic situation of the mount, situated to the north of the Tagus, which served as a natural frontier and protected it from incursions; the Tagus which was an important source of richness (water, fish, gold, navigation, etc.), a mount situated in the confluence and transition of territories, crossroads of trails between south and norther, free of overflows, with persistent fog, cleansed of good aires, all these were conditions that,...gave the location the conditions necessary to attract colonists, colonization that, it seems, not to have been easy...

On 24 April 1281, King Dinis of Portugal, conceded the ownership of Abrantes to Queen Elizabeth of Portugal.

Afonso IV of Portugal transferred the title of the religious parish to the Knights Hospitaller, in 1327, and granted Abrantes to Leonor Teles. Partners of the Master of Avis, the Abrantinos were one of the first to support the Lisboete movement of 1383, among them Fernando Álvares de Almeida, protector of the Casa de Abrantes.

King Manuel stayed in Abrantes for a long period; by 1510 he conceded a new foral to the town; and his children, the Infantes Fernando and Luís were born in Abrantes. During the 16th century, Abrantes and its religious parish was one of the largest and more populous lands in the Kingdom, with 3,436 inhabitants, four convents and 13 chapels or churches within its frontiers.

In 1581, in his move to Tomar, Philip I of Portugal stopped in Abrantes for several days, and during his reign was responsible for the reconstruction of Abrantes' municipal buildings. It was the seat of Portuguese marquesses, one of which was an early patron of the Brazilian-born versatile scientist, naturalist and pioneering inventor-aeronaut Bartholomeu Lourenço de Gusmão.

During 1640, Abrantes was one of the first lands to declare their support for John IV of Portugal. From the 17th and 18th centuries onwards, its ancient military importance was confirmed, as it was used by Portuguese and foreign armies to garrison or concentrate their forces. The village of Abrantes was captured on 24 November 1807 by French general Jean-Andoche Junot, who was awarded a ducal title for his victory by Napoleon I in 1808, and used as base for further marshaling of French forces. In the Convention of Cintra (22 August 1808) the town was returned to the Portuguese.

During the reign of Joseph I (1750–1777) the village became the center of the silk industry, which prospered until 1800, designated the Academia Tubuciana.

In 1820, Abrantes supported the Liberal Revolution and celebrated the 1822 Constitution; although Miguel of Portugal did find many supporters in the municipality, no outright manifestation of support occurred in light of the Vilafrancada. In November 1862, the Santarém-Abrantes lines was opened, and by March 1868, a bridge between Abrantes and Rossio to the southern Tagus region was well underway.

An active republican center, Abrantes was the place of preparatory meetings for the 5 October 1910 Revolution, which may have contributed to the village's elevation to the status of city on 14 June 1916.

== Geography ==
=== Physical geography ===
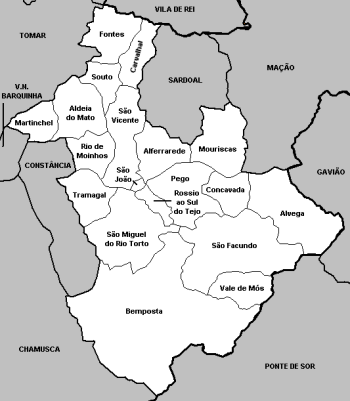
The civil parishes that comprise the municipality of Abrantes

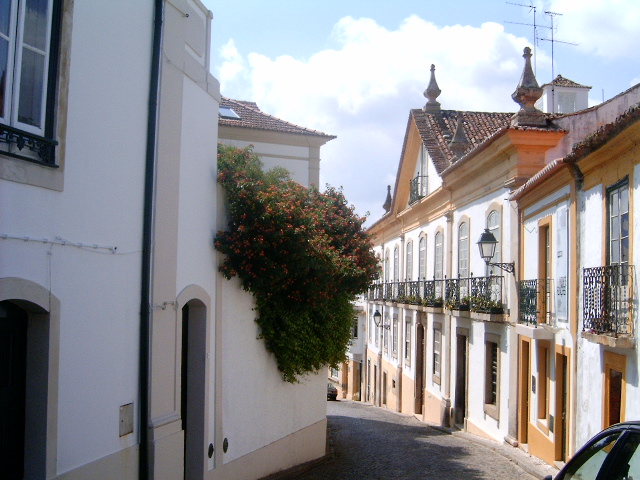
Rua de Abrantes, one the historical roads of the old quarter, in the municipal seat of Abrantes

Abrantes lies in a central enclave within the Portuguese territory and a transition zone between the Ribatejo, Beira Baixa and Alto Alentejo. This location allowed development of a diversified culture, influenced by many cultures around it; Sardoal and Vila de Rei, to the north; Mação and Gavião, to the east; Ponte de Sôr and Chamusca, in the south; and Constância and Tomar in the west. Abrantes is also located along many important road and rail links throughout the country, including the Madrid-Badajoz-Lisbon railway, being at the junction with the Guarda-Abrantes line, and the Lisbon-Porto access (the A23 and Beira Baixa roadways).

Abrantes commands the highway along the Tagus valley west from Belver (in the municipality of Gavião) until Constância, occupying the crest of a hill covered with olive woods, gardens and vines; historically, the fortified town has been regarded as an important military position.

The municipality is also center of two major hydrological resources: the Tagus River, which cross the territory for 30 kilometers and the Albufeira from Castelo do Bode.

=== Climate ===
Abrantes has a Mediterranean climate with hot, dry summers and mild, wet winters. Its location in the Tagus floodplain enables very high diurnal temperature variations; making nights cool, with an average yearly low of 8.7 °C (47.7 °F), and dropping below 0 °C (32 °F) 31 days on average during the cold months; and days being warm to hot, with an average yearly high of 23.3 °C (73.9 °F).

Climate data for Abrantes (Alvega), 1991-2020, altitude: 105 m (344 ft)
Month	Jan	Feb	Mar	Apr	May	Jun	Jul	Aug	Sep	Oct	Nov	Dec	Year
Mean daily maximum °C (°F)	15.0 (59.0)	16.2 (61.2)	20.1 (68.2)	21.7 (71.1)	24.7 (76.5)	28.7 (83.7)	32.0 (89.6)	32.8 (91.0)	29.9 (85.8)	24.3 (75.7)	18.8 (65.8)	15.4 (59.7)	23.3 (73.9)
Daily mean °C (°F)	9.1 (48.4)	9.9 (49.8)	12.8 (55.0)	14.6 (58.3)	17.5 (63.5)	20.7 (69.3)	23.0 (73.4)	23.5 (74.3)	21.1 (70.0)	17.2 (63.0)	12.7 (54.9)	10.1 (50.2)	16.0 (60.8)
Mean daily minimum °C (°F)	3.2 (37.8)	3.6 (38.5)	5.5 (41.9)	7.5 (45.5)	10.3 (50.5)	12.7 (54.9)	14.0 (57.2)	14.2 (57.6)	12.3 (54.1)	10.1 (50.2)	6.6 (43.9)	4.8 (40.6)	8.7 (47.7)
Average precipitation mm (inches)	66.2 (2.61)	49.7 (1.96)	44.4 (1.75)	45.4 (1.79)	44.2 (1.74)	14.5 (0.57)	4.7 (0.19)	5.6 (0.22)	25.4 (1.00)	91.4 (3.60)	78.9 (3.11)	75.4 (2.97)	545.8 (21.51)
Source: Portuguese Environment Agency

=== Human geography ===
Administratively, the municipality is divided into 13 civil parishes (Portuguese: freguesias), responsible for local area development and administration of services:

- Abrantes (São Vicente e São João) e Alferrarede
- Aldeia do Mato e Souto
- Alvega e Concavada
- Bemposta
- Carvalhal
- Fontes
- Martinchel
- Mouriscas
- Pego
- Rio de Moinhos
- São Facundo e Vale das Mós
- São Miguel do Rio Torto e Rossio ao Sul do Tejo
- Tramagal

It has grown dramatically since the early 20th century: from a base population of 7,255 in 1900, it had more than 41,000 inhabitants in 2001.

== Notable people ==
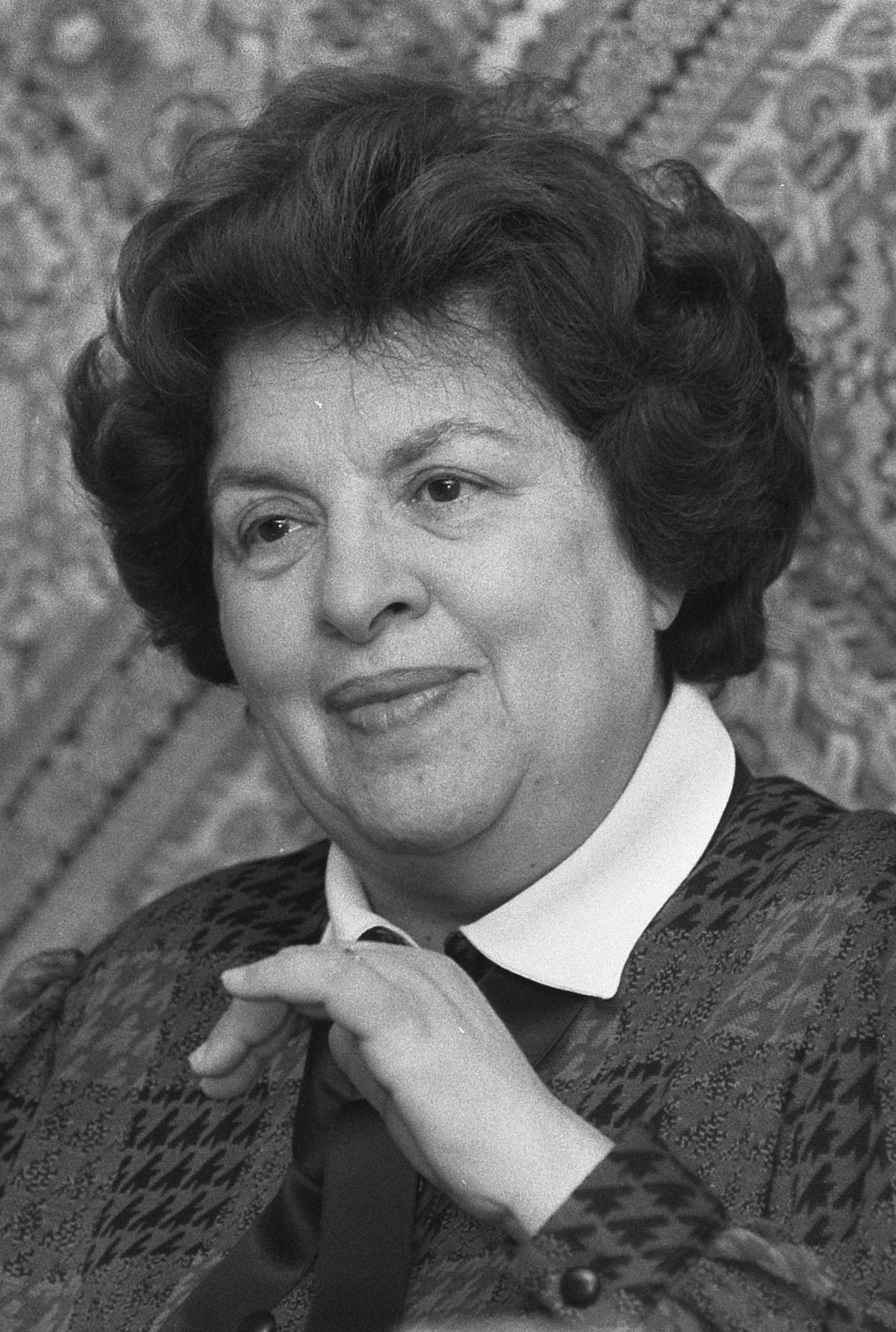
Maria de Lourdes Pintasilgo, 1986

- Jorge de Lencastre, Duke of Coimbra (1481–1550) a prince, illegitimate son of King John II of Portugal
- Luís of Portugal, Duke of Beja (1506–1555) the second son of King Manuel I of Portugal
- Ferdinand of Portugal, Duke of Guarda 1507–1534) a prince, the son of King Manuel I of Portugal
- António Leal Moreira (1758–1819) a Portuguese classical composer and organist
- Joaquim Marques Esparteiro (1895–1976) a Portuguese navy officer and colonial administrator
- Maria de Lourdes Pintasilgo (1930–2004) a chemical engineer and politician; the first and to date the only woman Prime Minister of Portugal

=== Sport ===
- Luís Mena e Silva (1902–1963) a Portuguese horse rider; bronze medallist at the 1936 & 1948 Summer Olympics
- Hélder Catalão (born 1955) a former footballer with 335 club caps
