= Oeste e Vale do Tejo =

Coordinates: 39°08′10″N 8°33′00″E

- Region
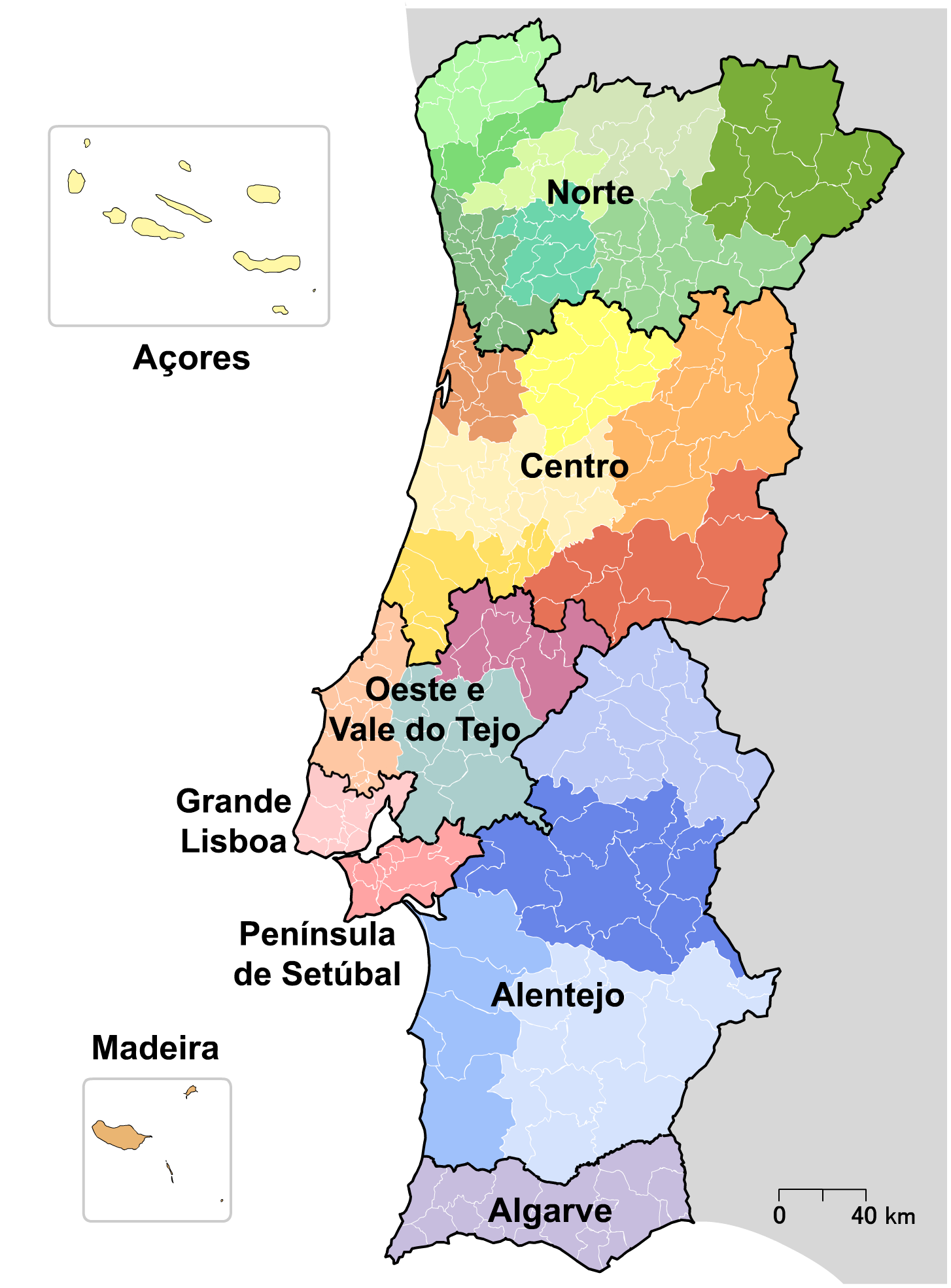
- Country: Portugal
- Region: Continental Portugal

Area
  - Total: 9,201 km^{2} (3,553 sq mi)

Population (2024)
  - Total: 852,583
  - Density: 92.66/km^{2} (240.0/sq mi)

GDP (nominal)
  - Total: €18.227 billion (2024)
  - Per capita: €21,220 (2024)
- Time zone: UTC+0 (WET)
  - Summer (DST): UTC+1 (WEST)
- NUTS: PT1D

Oeste e Vale do Tejo (in English: West and Tagus Valley) is a region of Portugal as defined by the Nomenclature of Territorial Units for Statistics (NUTS). It is one of the nine classified NUTS-2 statistical regions of Portugal. It is located in the center of Continental Portugal, and encompasses an area of 9,201 km^{2} (3,553 sq mi). The region is situated in the Tejo River valley, which gives part of its name. It is bordered by the Centro region to the north, Greater Lisbon to the southwest, Setubal to the south, Alentejo to the southeast, and the Atlantic Ocean to the west. The region was created in 2024 from parts of the Centro and Alentejo regions, and incorporates 34 municipalities across three intermunicipal communities.

== Classification ==
The country of Portugal is organized into 18 districts and 21 intermunicipal communities for administrative purposes. The Nomenclature of Territorial Units for Statistics (NUTS) organizes the country into nine broader level regions. These are classified as a NUTS-2 statistical regions of Portugal, and incorporate one or more intermunicipal communities within it. These communities form the NUTS-3 territorial units under them.

== Geography ==
Oeste e Vale do Tejo forms the central part of the Continental Portugal, encompassing an area of 9,201 km^{2} (3,553 sq mi) (roughly 10% of the land area of Portugal). The region was created in 2024 from parts of the Centro and Alentejo regions. The region is located in Western Europe, bordered by the Atlantic Ocean to the west. The region has a coastline of 127 km (79 mi), which is roughly 11% of the country's coastline. It is bordered by the Centro region to the north, Greater Lisbon to the southwest, Setubal to the south, Alentejo to the southeast, and the Atlantic Ocean to the west. The terrain is mostly flat with a maximum altitude of 677 m (2,221 ft). The region is situated in the Tejo river valley, which gives part of its name.

=== NUTS-3 ===
The region incorporates three intermunicipal communities–Oeste, Médio Tejo, and Lezíria do Tejo. These communities are further divided into 34 municipalities.

- Abrantes
- Alcobaça
- Alenquer
- Almeirim
- Alpiarça
- Alcanena
- Arruda dos Vinhos
- Azambuja
- Benavente
- Bombarral
- Cadaval
- Caldas da Rainha
- Cartaxo
- Chamusca
- Constância
- Coruche
- Entroncamento
- Ferreira do Zêzere
- Golegã
- Lourinhã
- Mação
- Nazaré
- Óbidos
- Ourém
- Peniche
- Rio Maior
- Salvaterra de Magos
- Santarém
- Sardoal
- Sobral de Monte Agraço
- Tomar
- Torres Novas
- Torres Vedras
- Vila Nova da Barquinha

== Demographics and economy ==
With a population of 852,583 inhabitants, the region is the third least populated of the seven regions in Continental Portugal. The population is largely rural. The population consists of 410,180 males and 442,403 females. The employment rate was 72.9% among the eligible age group of 16 to 64 years. In 2023, the region had a GDP of €16.56 billion, roughly contributing 6.2% of the total GDP of the country.
