= Médio Tejo =

- Intermunicipal community
- Logo
- Interactive map of Médio Tejo
- Location in Portugal
- Coordinates: 39°36′N 8°25′W
- Country: Portugal
- Region: Oeste e Vale do Tejo
- Established: 2008
- Seat: Tomar
- Municipalities: 13

Area
  - Total: 3,344.31 km^{2} (1,291.25 sq mi)

Population (2011)
  - Total: 247,331
  - Density: 73.9558/km^{2} (191.545/sq mi)
- Time zone: UTC+00:00 (WET)
  - Summer (DST): UTC+01:00 (WEST)
- Website: mediotejo.pt

The Comunidade Intermunicipal do Médio Tejo (Portuguese pronunciation: [ˈmɛðju ˈtɛʒu]; English: Middle Tagus) is an administrative division in Portugal. It was created in December 2008, replacing the former Comunidade Urbana do Médio Tejo created in 2004. It takes its name from the river Tagus. Médio Tejo is also a NUTS 3 subregion of Oeste e Vale do Tejo, the NUTS 3 subregion has covered the same area as the intermunicipal community.

The seat of the intermunicipal community is Tomar. Médio Tejo comprises parts of the former districts of Santarém and Castelo Branco.

The population in 2011 was 247,331, in an area of 3,344.31 square kilometres (1,291.25 mi^{2}).

== Municipalities ==
The CIM Médio Tejo is composed of 11 municipalities:

Municipality	Population (2011)	Area (km^{2})
Abrantes	39,325	714.69
Alcanena	13,868	127.33
Constância	4,056	80.37
Entroncamento	20,206	13.73
Ferreira do Zêzere	8,619	190.38
Mação	7,338	399.98
Ourém	45,932	416.68
Sardoal	3,939	92.15
Tomar	40,677	351.20
Torres Novas	36,717	270.00
Vila Nova da Barquinha	7,322	49.53
Total	227,999	2,706.03

== Gallery ==
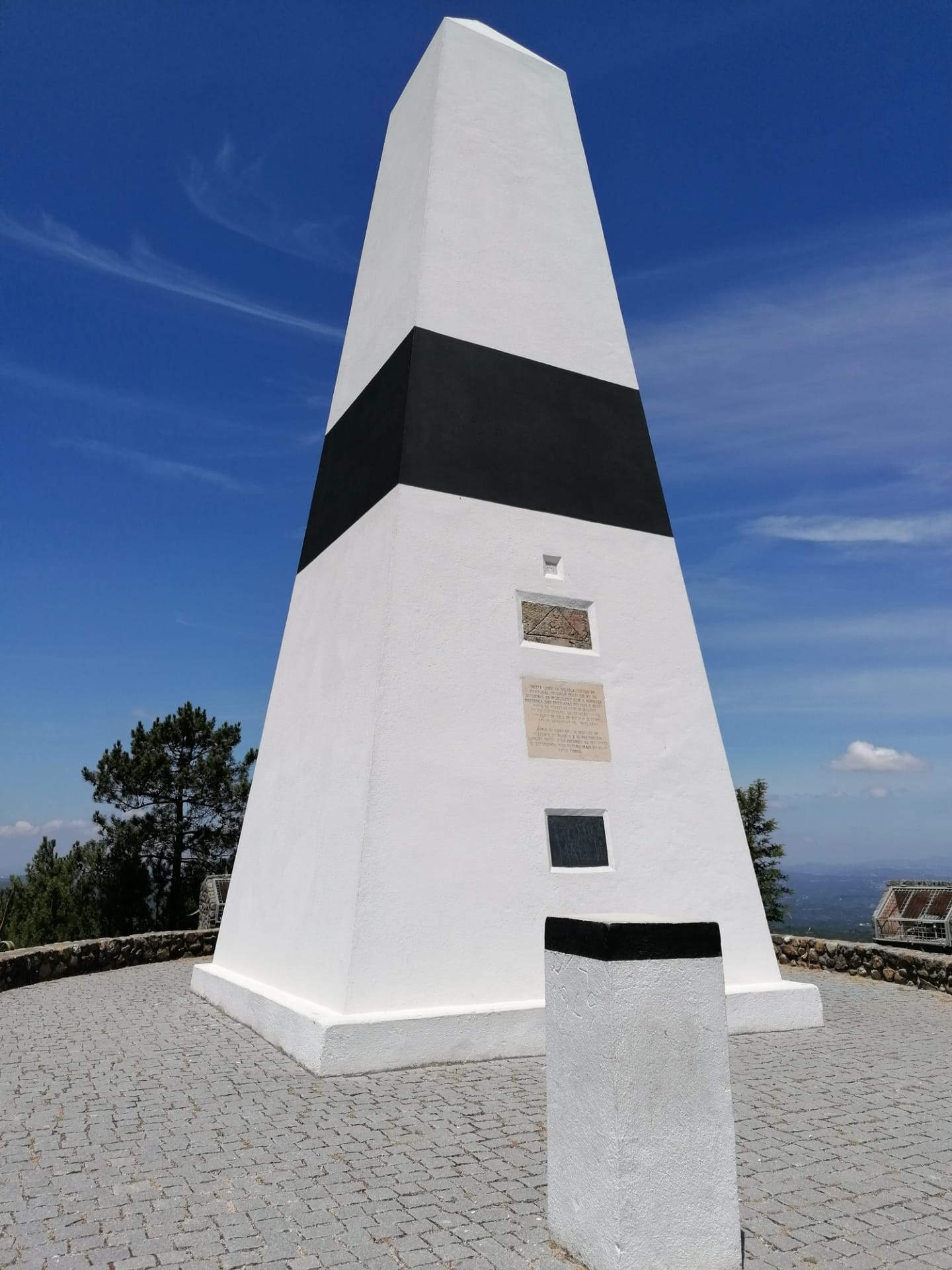
Geodesic Center of Portugal

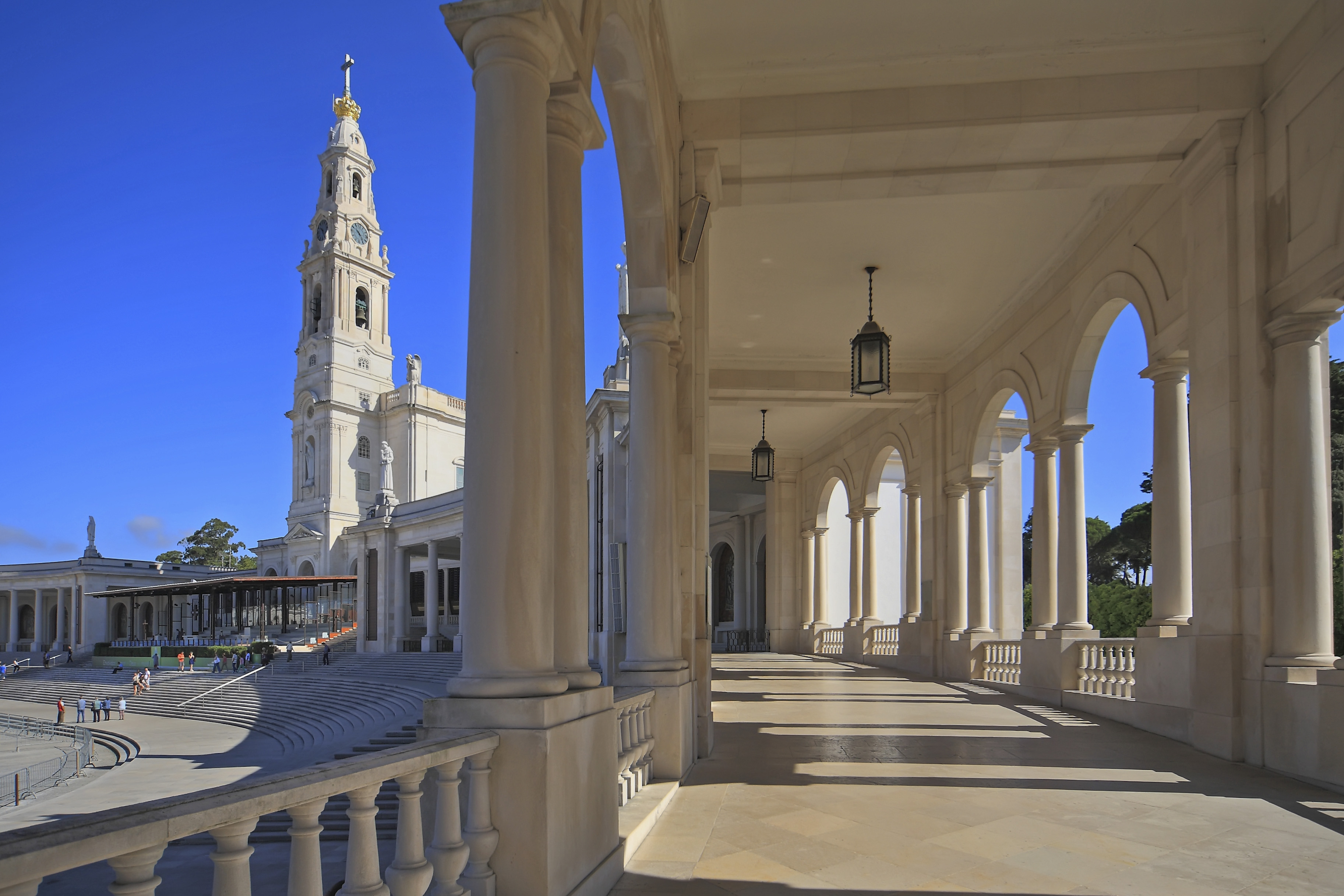
Sanctuary of Fátima

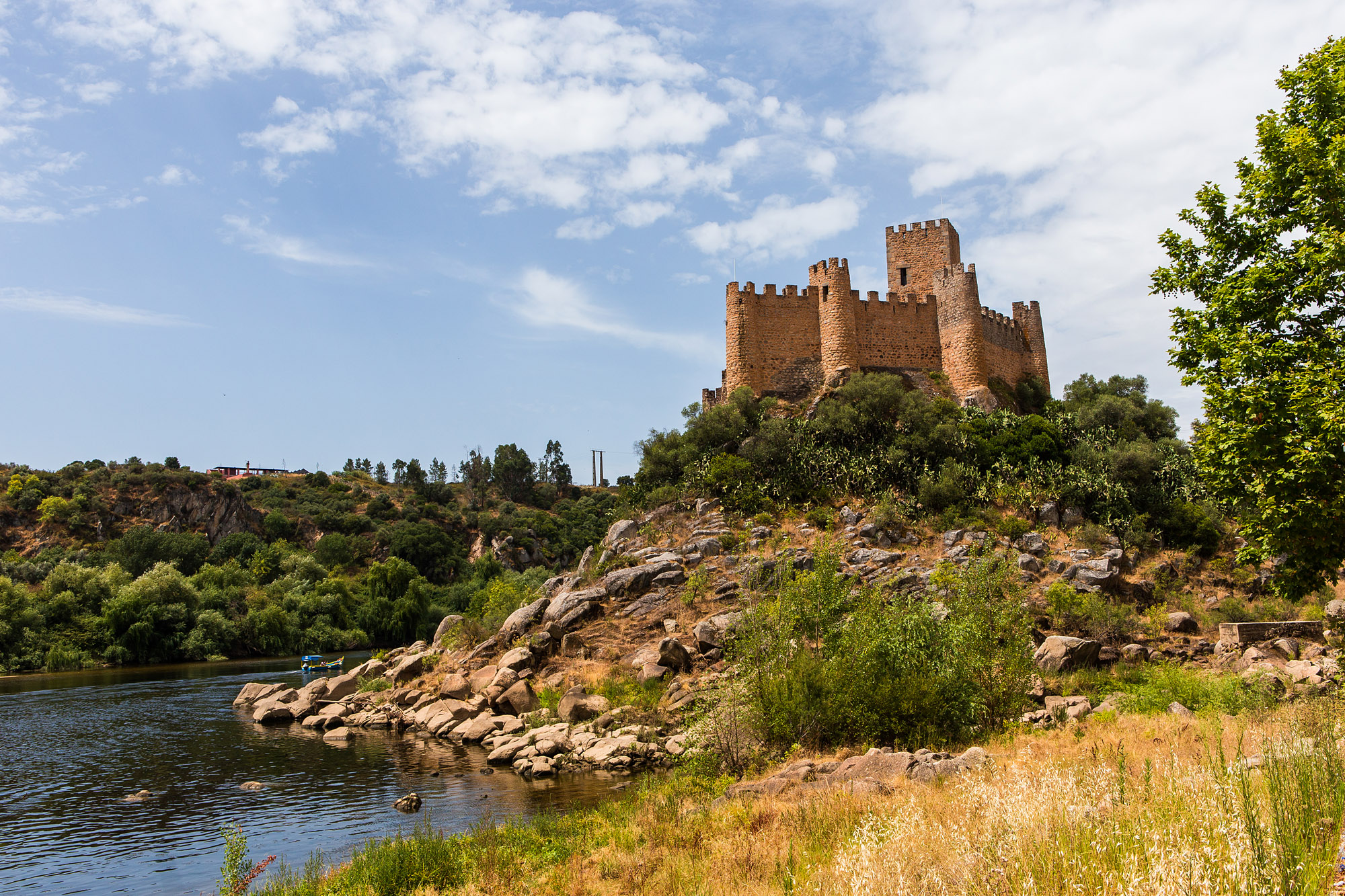
Castle of Almourol

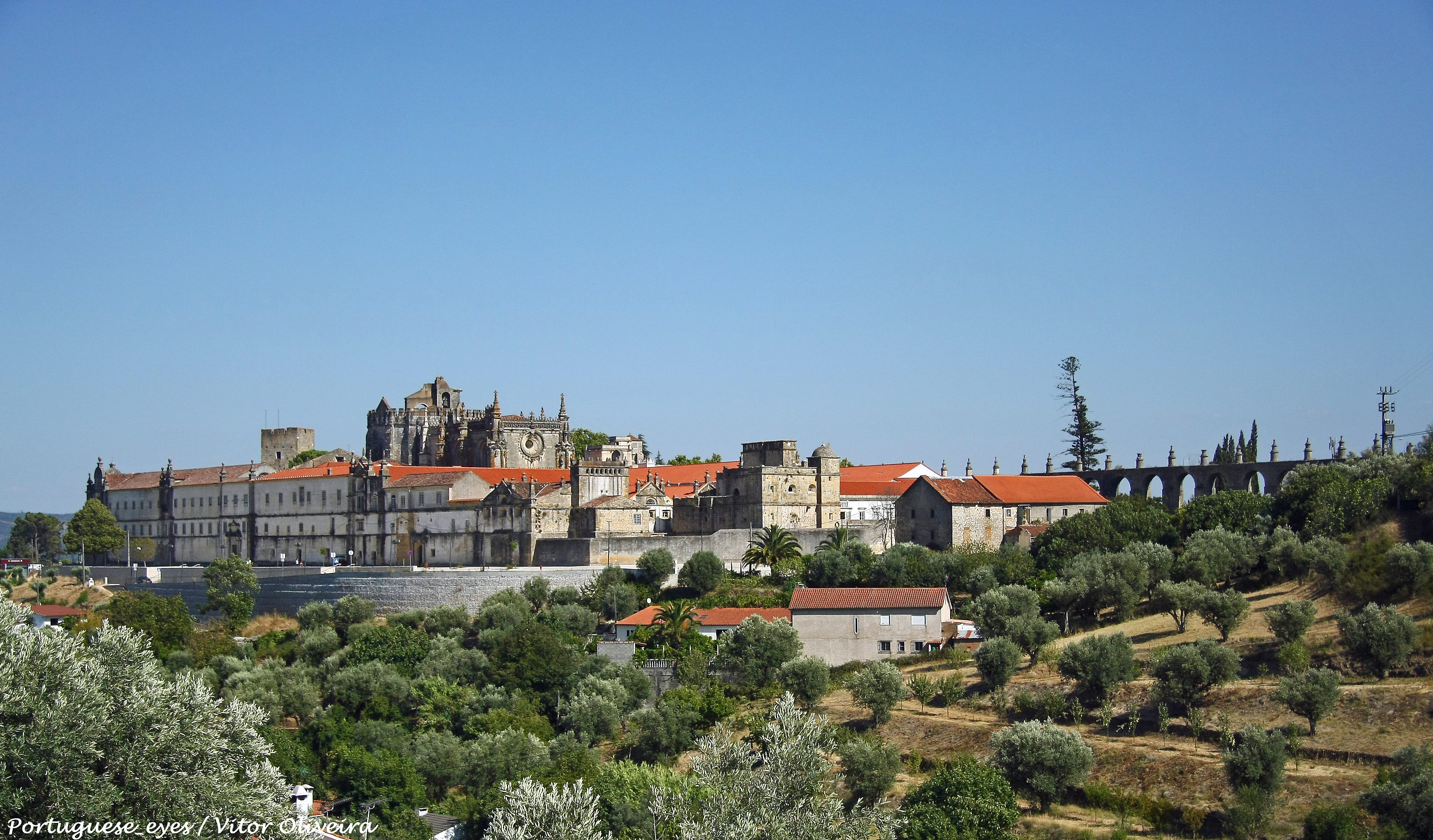
Convent of Christ

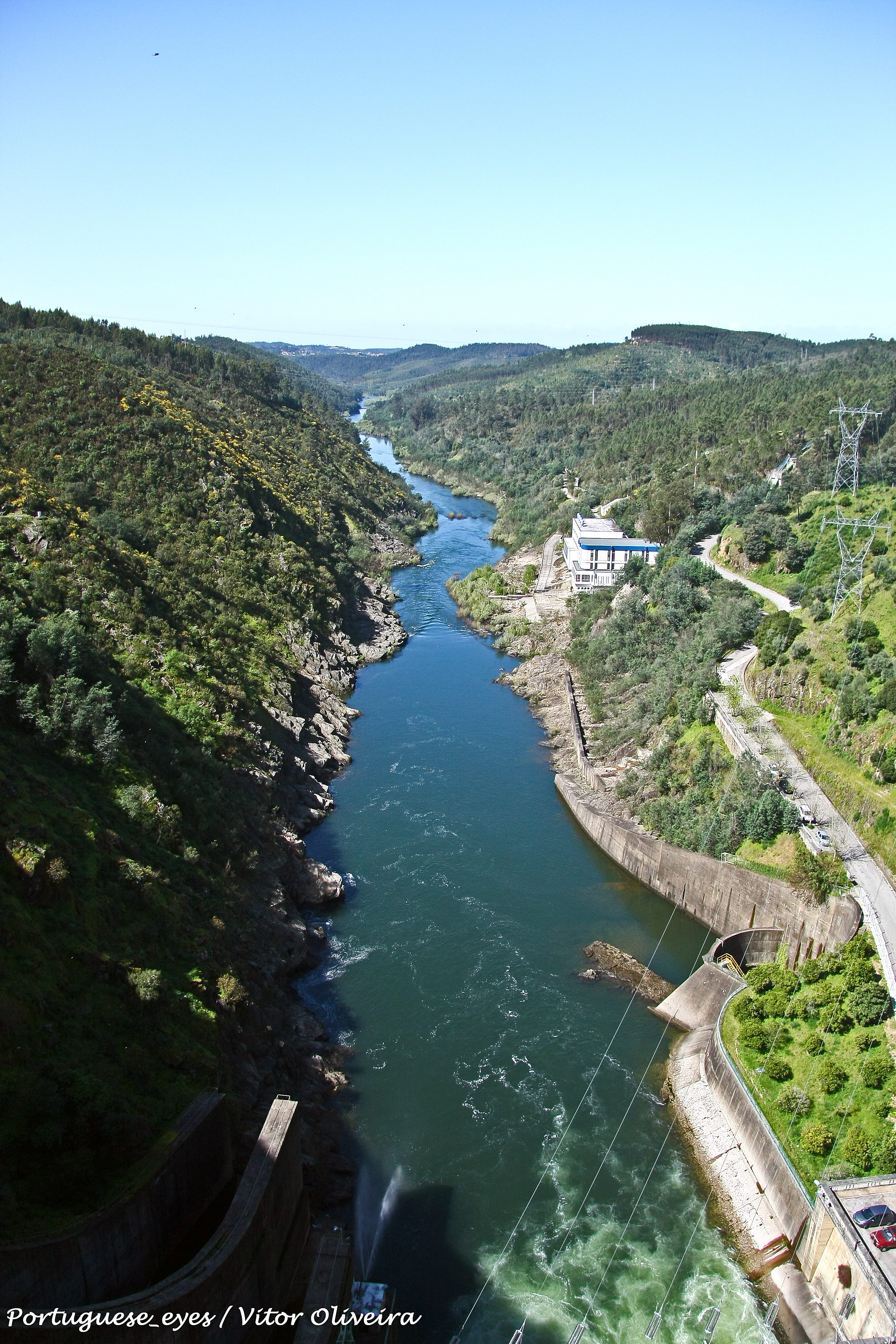
Castelo de Bode Dam and Zêzere River

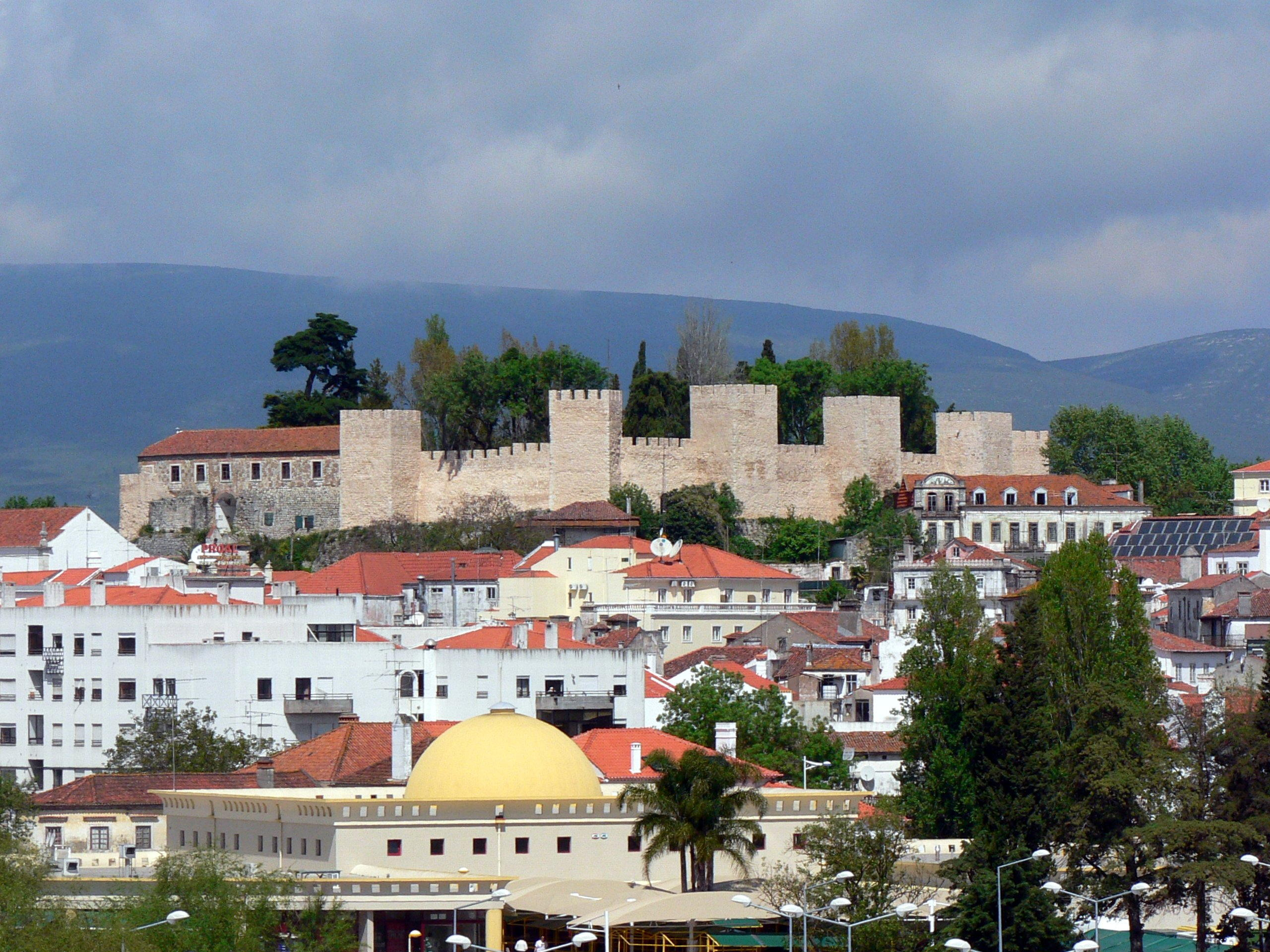
Castle of Torres Novas
