= List of freguesias of Portugal: O =

The freguesias (civil parishes) of Portugal are listed in by municipality according to the following format:

- concelho
  - freguesias

== Óbidos ==
- A dos Negros
- Amoreira
- Gaeiras
- Óbidos (Santa Maria)
- Óbidos (São Pedro)
- Olho Marinho
- Sobral da Lagoa
- Usseira
- Vau

== Odemira ==
- Bicos
- Boavista dos Pinheiros
- Colos
- Longueira/Almograve
- Luzianes-Gare
- Odemira (Santa Maria)
- Odemira (São Salvador)
- Pereiras-Gare
- Relíquias
- Sabóia
- Santa Clara-a-Velha
- São Luís
- São Martinho das Amoreiras
- São Teotónio
- Vale de Santiago
- Vila Nova de Milfontes
- Zambujeira do Mar

== Odivelas ==
- Caneças
- Famões
- Odivelas
- Olival Basto
- Pontinha
- Póvoa de Santo Adrião
- Ramada

== Oeiras ==
- Algés
- Barcarena
- Carnaxide
- Caxias
- Cruz Quebrada-Dafundo
- Linda-a-Velha
- Oeiras e São Julião da Barra
- Paço de Arcos
- Porto Salvo
- Queijas

== Oleiros ==
- Álvaro
- Amieira
- Cambas
- Estreito
- Isna
- Madeirã
- Mosteiro
- Oleiros
- Orvalho
- Sarnadas de São Simão
- Sobral
- Vilar Barroco

== Olhão ==
- Fuseta
- Moncarapacho
- Olhão
- Pechão
- Quelfes

== Oliveira de Azeméis ==
- Carregosa
- Cesar
- Fajões
- Loureiro
- Macieira de Sarnes
- Macinhata da Seixa
- Madail
- Nogueira do Cravo
- Oliveira de Azeméis
- Ossela
- Palmaz
- Pindelo
- Pinheiro da Bemposta
- Santiago da Riba-Ul
- São Martinho da Gândara
- São Roque
- Travanca
- Ul
- Vila de Cucujães

== Oliveira de Frades ==
- Arca
- Arcozelo das Maias
- Destriz
- Oliveira de Frades
- Pinheiro
- Reigoso
- Ribeiradio
- São João da Serra
- São Vicente de Lafões
- Sejães
- Souto de Lafões
- Varzielas

== Oliveira do Bairro ==
- Bustos
- Mamarrosa
- Oiã
- Oliveira do Bairro
- Palhaça
- Troviscal

== Oliveira do Hospital ==
- Aldeia das Dez
- Alvoco das Várzeas
- Avô
- Bobadela
- Ervedal
- Lagares
- Lagos da Beira
- Lajeosa
- Lourosa
- Meruge
- Nogueira do Cravo
- Oliveira do Hospital
- Penalva de Alva
- Santa Ovaia
- São Gião
- São Paio de Gramaços
- São Sebastião da Feira
- Seixo da Beira
- Travanca de Lagos
- Vila Franca da Beira
- Vila Pouca da Beira

== Ourém ==
- Alburitel
- Atouguia
- Casal dos Bernardos
- Caxarias
- Cercal
- Espite
- Fátima
- Formigais
- Freixianda
- Gondemaria
- Matas
- Nossa Senhora da Piedade
- Nossa Senhora das Misericórdias
- Olival
- Ribeira do Fárrio
- Rio de Couros
- Seiça
- Urqueira

== Ourique ==
- Conceição
- Garvão
- Ourique
- Panóias
- Santa Luzia
- Santana da Serra

== Ovar ==
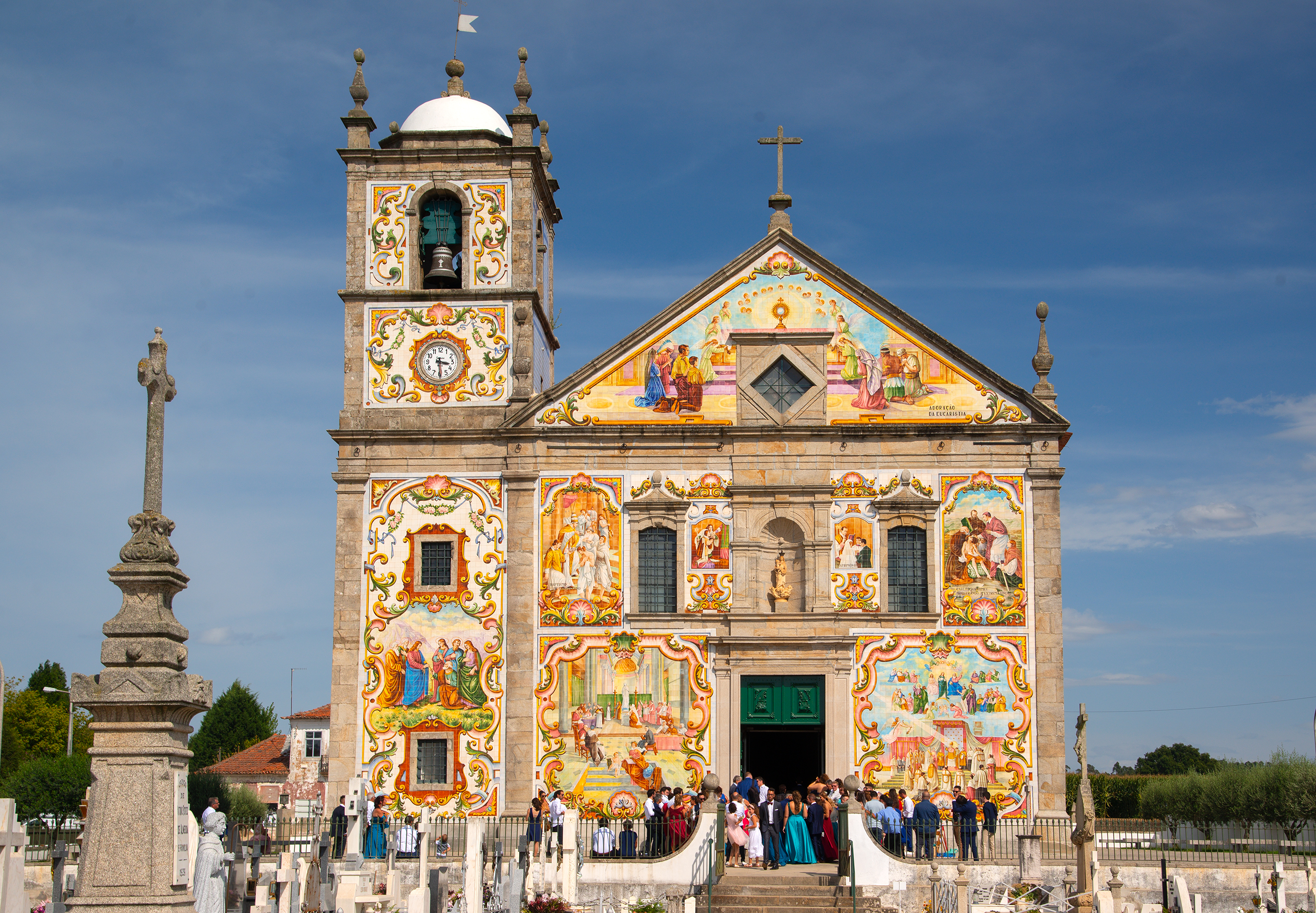
Parish church, Santa Maria de Válega, in Válega

- Arada
- Cortegaça
- Esmoriz
- Maceda
- Ovar
- São João
- São Vicente de Pereira Jusã
- Válega
