= Cambas =

Cambas or Cambás may refer to:

- Cambás, a river of Galicia
- Cambas (Oleiros), a parish in Oleiros, Portugal
- Christian Cambas, Greek DJ and producer
- Jacqueline Cambas, American film editor

== See also ==
- Camba
