= Artur Santos =

Artur Santos may refer to:

- Artur Santos (journalist) (1884–1955), Portuguese journalist and politician
- Artur Santos (footballer) (1931–2025), Portuguese footballer
