= Rio de Couros e Casal dos Bernardos =

- Civil parish
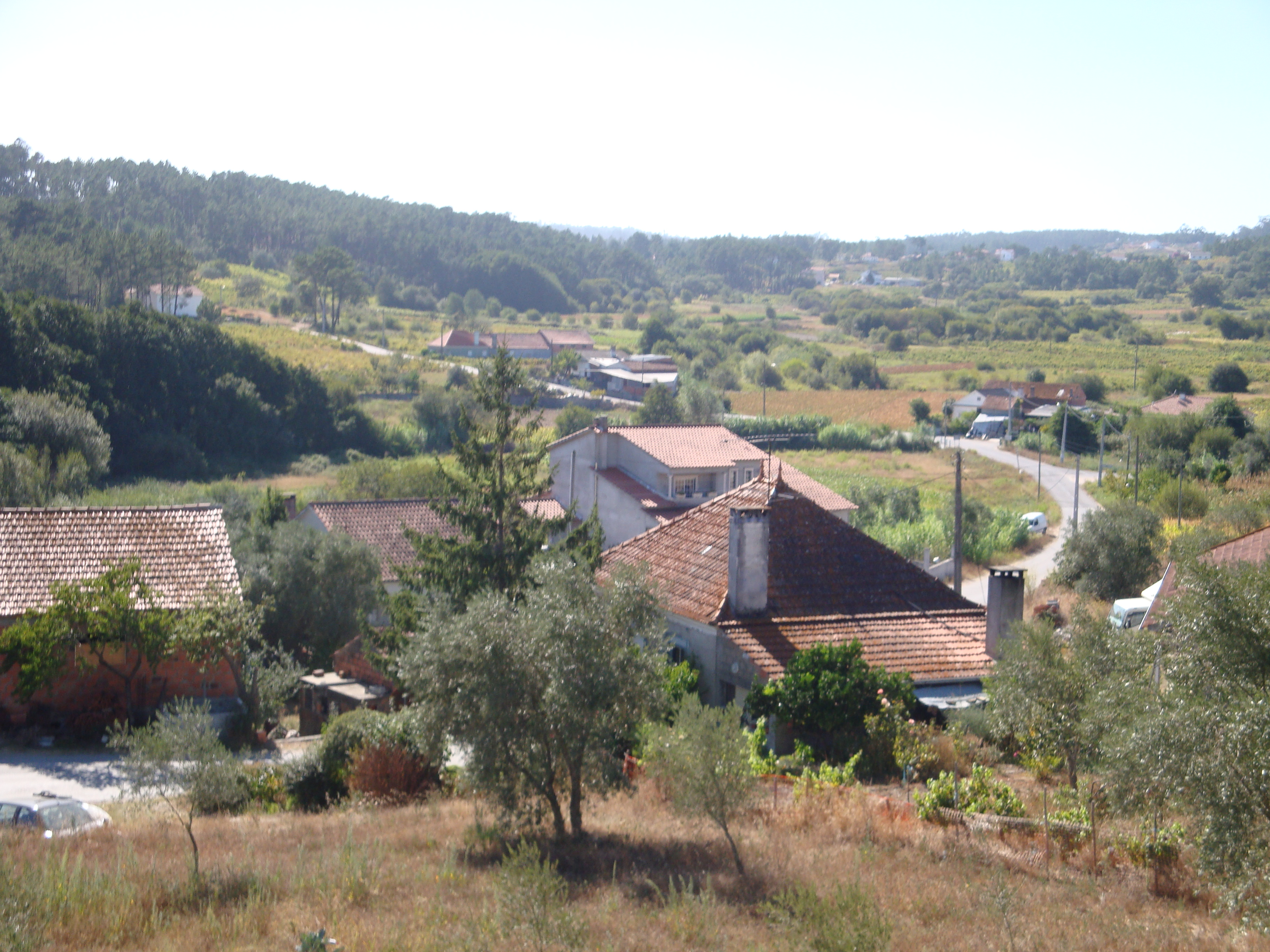

- Location in Portugal
- Coordinates: 39°45′02″N 8°31′04″W
- Country: Portugal
- Region: Oeste e Vale do Tejo
- Intermunic. comm.: Médio Tejo
- District: Santarém
- Municipality: Ourém

Area
  - Total: 44.11 km^{2} (17.03 sq mi)

Population (2021)
  - Total: 2,294
  - Density: 52.01/km^{2} (134.7/sq mi)
- Time zone: UTC+00:00 (WET)
  - Summer (DST): UTC+01:00 (WEST)

Rio de Couros e Casal dos Bernardos is a civil parish in the municipality of Ourém, Portugal. It was formed in 2013 by the merger of the former parishes of Rio de Couros and Casal dos Bernardos. The population in 2021 was 2,294, down from 2,798 in 2011, in an area of 44.11 km^{2}.
