= Artur de Oliveira Santos =

Portuguese mayor and journalist (1884–1955)

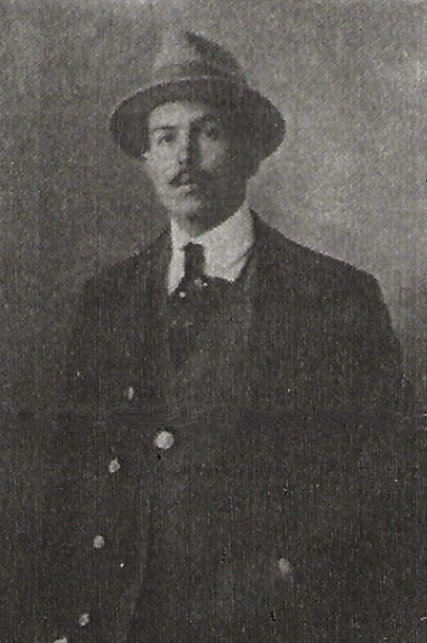

Municipal Administrator of Ourém
- In office 23 October 1915 – 28 February 1918
- In office 24 April 1920 – 31 July 1920

Personal details
- Born: 22 January 1884 Ourém, Kingdom of Portugal
- Died: 27 June 1955 (aged 71) Lisbon, Portugal
- Spouse: Idalina de Oliveira Santos
- Occupation: Local politician

Artur de Oliveira Santos (Note: Alternatively rendered as Arthur d'Oliveira Santos, the standard spelling before the 1911 spelling reform.) (22 January 1884 – 27 June 1955), was a Portuguese journalist and local politician, most widely known for being the Municipal Administrator of Ourém, in which the locality of Fátima is located, during the time of the apparitions of Our Lady of Fátima to three young shepherd children in 1917.

== Career ==
Although he had little formal education, Artur Santos was made the editor of the local newspaper Ouriense, in which he displayed his anti-monarchical and anti-religious opinions. In his twenties he was elected to the Masonic lodge of Leiria, and then founded a separate Lodge at Vila Nova de Ourém, his native town. Shortly after that he was made Municipal Administrator of Ourém. This position was essentially an appointed mayor, a delegate of the central government who was tasked with, among other things, maintaining public order. It carried with it the additional titles of President of the Municipal Chamber (the town hall), and Judge Substitute of Comarca. Invested with the authority of all these titles, Santos was, at the time of the apparitions, the most influential man in his area of Portugal.

== Role in the Fátima apparitions ==
Artur Santos was known for his hostility towards organized religion in general and Catholicism in particular. He was especially hostile with regards to the apparitions and repeatedly sent law enforcement officials to seek to impede public access to the site. He went so far as to kidnap the three children and place them in jail, in order to prevent them from proclaiming another apparition. Years later, Lucia would recall how the three had been jailed, and that Santos had threatened the children with being boiled in oil unless they revealed to him the secret which they had reported receiving from the Lady.

In his later years, Artur Santos professed to be a Christian, but denied going to Mass or Confession. He sent a letter to a newspaper stating his side of the story on the issue of having arrested the children. Although stripped of political offices in his later years, he took pride in the fame he once had, and asserted that he was known all over the world "and in Russia, too".
