= Nuno Laranjeiro =

Portuguese footballer

Personal information
- Full name: Nuno Filipe Rodrigues Laranjeiro
- Date of birth: 18 January 1983 (age 43)
- Place of birth: Ourém, Portugal
- Height: 1.84 m (6 ft 0 in)
- Position: Full-back

Youth career
- 1993–1996: Atlético Ouriense
- 1996–1998: Sporting CP
- 1998–2002: União Leiria

Senior career*
Years	Team	Apps	(Gls)
2002–2008	União Leiria	108	(3)
2008–2011	Leixões	45	(2)
2011–2012	Fátima	26	(7)
2012–2013	Freamunde	38	(5)
2013–2014	Chaves	6	(0)
2014–2015	União Leiria	20	(0)
2015–2019	Fátima	104	(18)
Total		347	(35)

International career
2003–2004	Portugal U20	6	(0)
2004	Portugal U21	1	(0)
- * Club domestic league appearances and goals

Nuno Filipe Rodrigues Laranjeiro (born 18 January 1983) is a Portuguese former professional footballer who played as a right or left-back.

He played 145 Primeira Liga matches over nine seasons (four goals), at the service of União de Leiria (seven years) and Leixões (two).

== Club career ==
Born in Ourém, Santarém District, Laranjeiro started his career at U.D. Leiria in 2001–02, becoming a first-team regular two seasons later, with the club always in the Primeira Liga.

In the 2007–08 campaign, he scored two goals from the penalty spot in the UEFA Intertoto Cup match against FK Hajduk Kula, as his team made it to the UEFA Cup on a 4–2 aggregate (1–0 defeat, 4–1 home win).

In August 2008, upon Leiria's relegation, Laranjeiro joined another top-flight struggler, Matosinhos' Leixões SC, starting most of his debut season to help them finish in sixth position. After only eight Segunda Liga matches in 2010–11, he left the club and signed for C.D. Fátima of the third division.

Until his retirement in 2019 at the age of 36, Laranjeiro competed mainly in the second and third tiers, representing S.C. Freamunde, G.D. Chaves, Leiria and Fátima. Immediately afterwards, he was appointed his last club's director of football.
