= Matas e Cercal =

- Civil parish
- Location in Portugal
- Coordinates: 39°44′20″N 8°39′18″W
- Country: Portugal
- Region: Oeste e Vale do Tejo
- Intermunic. comm.: Médio Tejo
- District: Santarém
- Municipality: Ourém

Area
  - Total: 20.75 km^{2} (8.01 sq mi)

Population (2011)
  - Total: 1,278
  - Density: 62/km^{2} (160/sq mi)
- Time zone: UTC+00:00 (WET)
  - Summer (DST): UTC+01:00 (WEST)

Matas e Cercal is a civil parish in the municipality of Ourém, Portugal. It was formed in 2013 by the merger of the former parishes of Matas and Cercal. The population in 2011 was 1,278, in an area of 20.75 km^{2}.
