= Espite =

- Civil parish
- Location in Portugal
- Coordinates: 39°45′55″N 8°38′14″W
- Country: Portugal
- Region: Oeste e Vale do Tejo
- Intermunic. comm.: Médio Tejo
- District: Santarém
- Municipality: Ourém

Area
  - Total: 18.96 km^{2} (7.32 sq mi)

Population (2011)
  - Total: 1,104
  - Density: 58/km^{2} (150/sq mi)
- Time zone: UTC+00:00 (WET)
  - Summer (DST): UTC+01:00 (WEST)

Espite is a civil parish in the municipality of Ourém, Portugal. The population in 2011 was 1,104, in an area of 18.96 km^{2}.
