= Ourém =

- Municipality
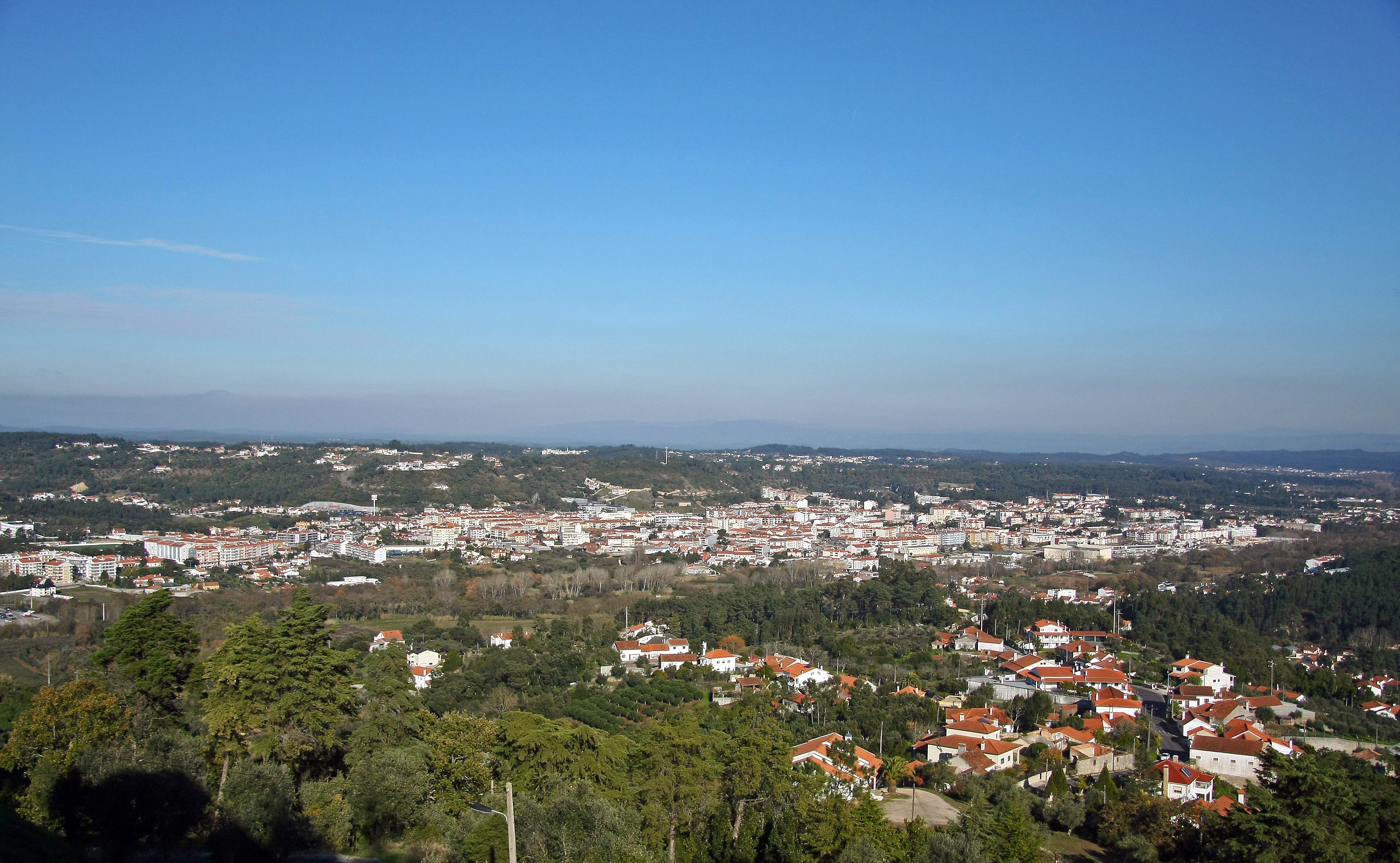
- View of Ourém

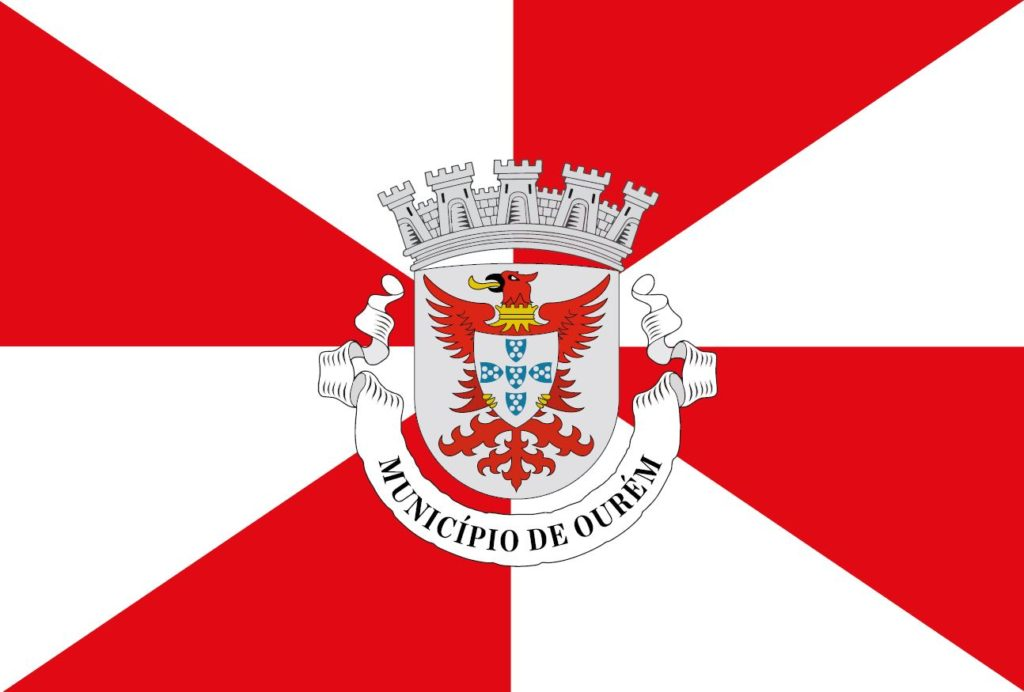
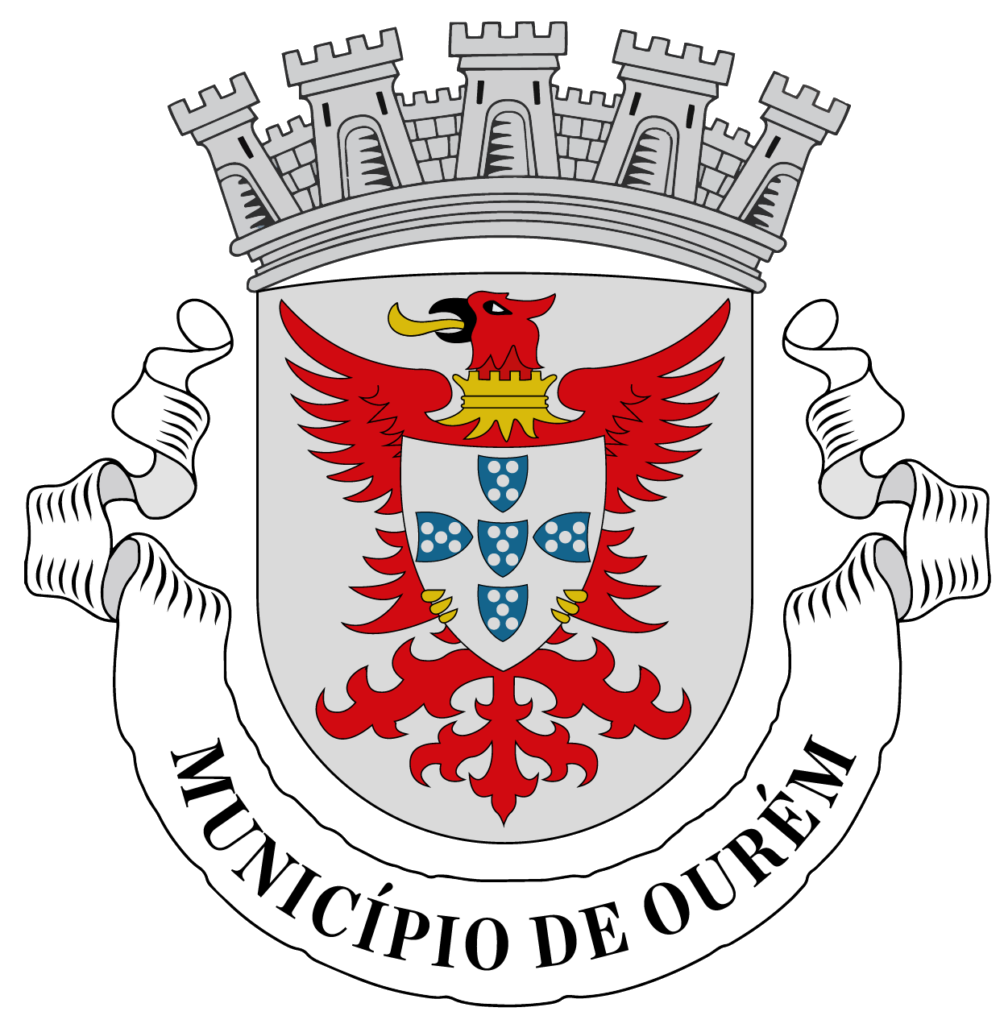
- Flag Coat of arms
- Interactive map of Ourém
- Coordinates: 39°39′N 8°34′W
- Country: Portugal
- Region: Oeste e Vale do Tejo
- Intermunic. comm.: Médio Tejo
- District: Santarém
- Parishes: 13

Government
  - President: Luís Miguel Albuquerque (PSD)

Area
  - Total: 416.68 km^{2} (160.88 sq mi)

Population (2011)
  - Total: 45,932
  - Density: 110.23/km^{2} (285.50/sq mi)
- Time zone: UTC+00:00 (WET)
  - Summer (DST): UTC+01:00 (WEST)
- Local holiday: June 20
- Website: www.ourem.pt

Ourém (European Portuguese: [oˈɾɐ̃j], locally [ɔˈɾɐ̃j]), formerly known as Aldeia da Cruz and later as Vila Nova de Ourém, is a city and municipality in the district of Santarém in Portugal. The population in 2011 was 45,932, in an area of 416.68 km^{2}. The municipality of Ourém contains two cities: Ourém (about 12,000 residents) and Fátima (about 11,000 inhabitants).

The municipality is bordered by the municipalities of Pombal (to the north), Alvaiázere (to the northeast), Ferreira do Zêzere and Tomar (to the east), Torres Novas (to the southeast), Alcanena (to the southwest), and Batalha and Leiria (to the west). The main historical attraction of the municipality is the mighty Castle of Ourém. Nevertheless, millions of faithful Catholics come to the parish of Fátima every year to visit Cova da Iria, the site where three child shepherds are said to have had visions of Our Lady of Fátima in 1917. The Sanctuary of Our Lady of Fátima has become one of the largest religious tourism sites in the world.

The present Mayor is Luís Miguel Albuquerque, elected by the Social Democratic Party.

The municipal holiday is June 20.

== History ==
A fortification existed in the region of Ourém since at least the period of Muslim domination. The area was reconquered by Christians in 1136, and the town was donated in 1178 by the first king of Portugal, Afonso Henriques, to his third daughter, Princess Theresa. The princess granted it a letter of feudal rights (foral) in 1180, to promote the settlement and development of the village.

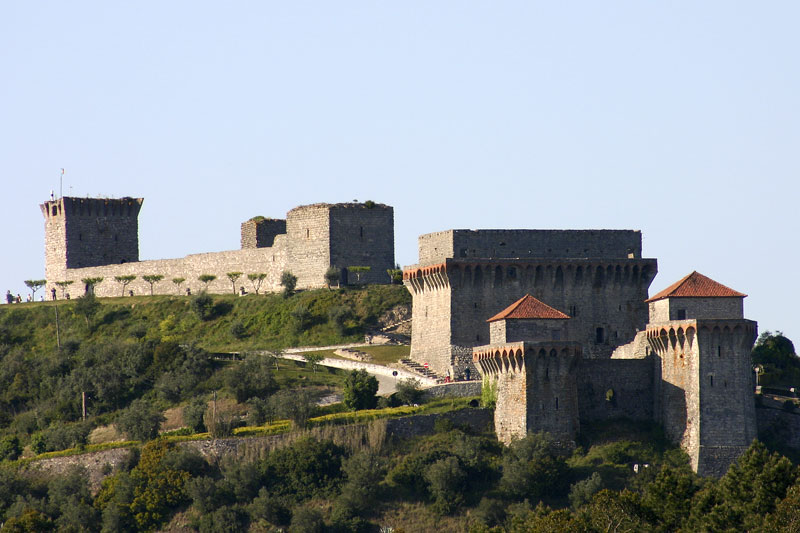
Castle of Ourém. The two towers flanking the entrance are located in the front right, with the ruins of the large palace of Count Afonso just behind them. The oldest portions of the castle are located in the back left of the image.

Under the Muslims, the village was apparently called Abdegas, but during the times of the Reconquista (12th century) it was called Portus de Auren, from which the name Ourém was later derived. According to popular myth, the name of the village is actually derived from a Moorish Princess who converted to Christianity under the name of Oureana.

The town's historical nucleus developed around the Castle of Ourém, which during the Reconquista served as watchpost for the Castle of Leiria, an important stronghold located nearby. In the mid-14th century, King Peter I turned Ourém and its lands into a County. The third Count of Ourém was the celebrated Nuno Álvares Pereira, the knight who led the Portuguese army to victory against the Castilians in the Battle of Aljubarrota in 1385.

Under Count Afonso (1402–1460), fourth Count of Ourém, the town flourished. To accommodate his court, Count Afonso remodelled the old-fashioned castle and built a palace inside it following the trends in 15th-century Italian military architecture. The ruins of the palace and castle are the main historical and touristic attraction of the town nowadays. Count Afonso is buried in the crypt of the main church of Ourém in a magnificent Gothic tomb created by one of Portugal's main sculptors of the time, Diogo Pires-o-Velho.

After reaching its peak in the 15th century, the town entered a period of relative decline. The town and castle were greatly damaged by the 1755 Lisbon earthquake and the Napoleonic Invasions.

From the time its former name, Aldeia da Cruz, was changed in the first half of the 19th century, until it was granted city status on 20 June 1991, it was known as Vila Nova de Ourém. Since then, its official name has simply been Ourém.

In January 2026, Storm Kristin caused a catastrophic impact in the municipality of Ourém with over 10,000 houses unroofed and around 300 people being displaced.

== Legend ==
The legend of the name of the village and Oureana is retold by Friar Bernardino de Brito in his Chronicle of the Order of Cister (1602): In a surprise attack on the St John's Day in 1158, a Christian knight, Gonçalo Hermigues and his companions kidnapped a Moorish princess with the famous Arab name of Fatima. The knight took Fatima to a small village of the recently created Kingdom of Portugal, in the Serra de Aire hills. The princess fell in love with the Christian knight and decided to become herself a Christian, taking the name of Oureana. After their marriage, the princess received as prize the town which she called Ourém, derived from her own name.

The name of the parish of Fátima of Ourém is probably related to this legend.

== Parishes ==
Parishes of the municipality of Ourém

Administratively, the municipality is divided into 13 civil parishes (freguesias):

- Alburitel
- Atouguia
- Caxarias
- Espite
- Fátima
- Freixianda, Ribeira do Farrio e Formigais
- Gondemaria e Olival
- Matas e Cercal
- Nossa Senhora da Piedade
- Nossa Senhora das Misericórdias
- Rio de Couros e Casal dos Bernardos
- Seiça
- Urqueira

== Population ==
Population of Ourém municipality (1801–2011)
1801	1849	1900	1930	1960	1981	1991	2001	2004	2011
12,803	13,033	25,726	34,534	47,511	41,376	40,185	46,216	49,269	45,932

== International relations ==
Ourém is twinned with the following cities:

- Le Plessis-Trévise, France (since 1992)
- São Filipe, Cape Verde (since 1999)
- Altötting, Germany (since 2009)
- Częstochowa, Poland (since 1997)
- Monapo, Mozambique (since 2001)
- Lourdes, France
- (United States) Russells Point, USA (since 2018)

=== Cooperation agreements ===
- Pitești, Romania (since 2011)

== Notable people ==
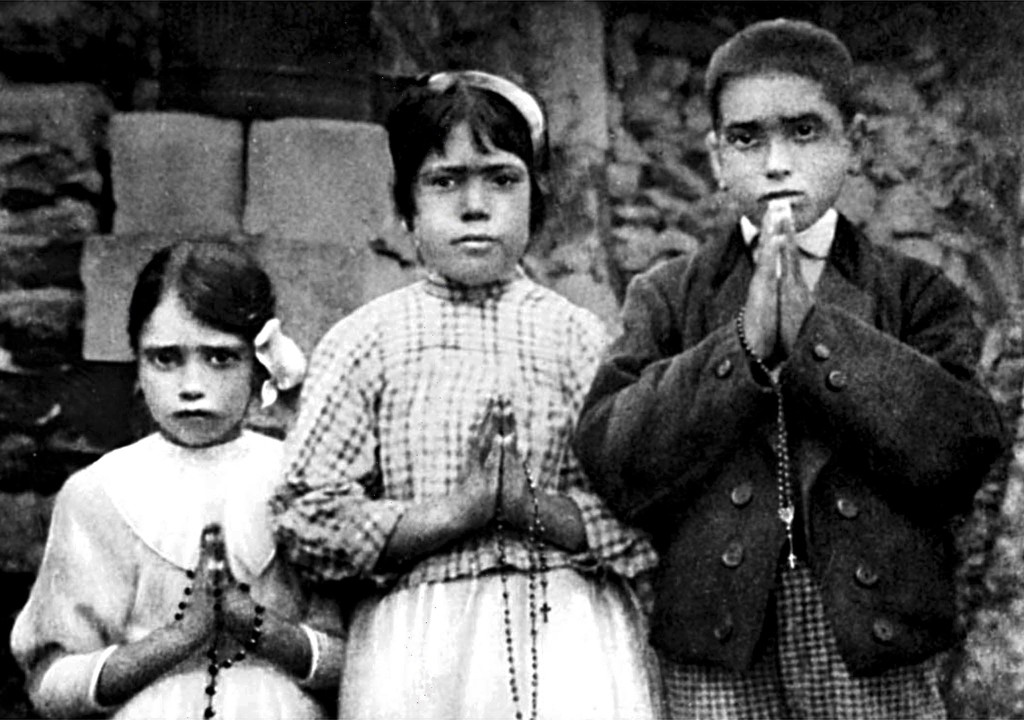
the Fatima children with rosaries

- Artur de Oliveira Santos (1884 in Ourém – 1955) a journalist, local politician and the Municipal Administrator of Ourém in 1917 during the time of the apparitions of Our Lady of Fátima
- Francisco and Jacinta Marto (1908–1919) & (1910–1920) siblings from Aljustrel, with their cousin Lúcia dos Santos (1907–2005) witnessed three apparitions of the Angel of Peace in 1916 and several apparitions of the Blessed Virgin Mary at Cova da Iria in 1917
- José Luandino Vieira (born 1935 in Lagoa de Furadouro) an Angolan writer of short fiction and novels
- Nuno Laranjeiro (born 1983 in Ourém) a former footballer with 347 club caps
