= Atouguia =

Atougiuia
- Civil parish
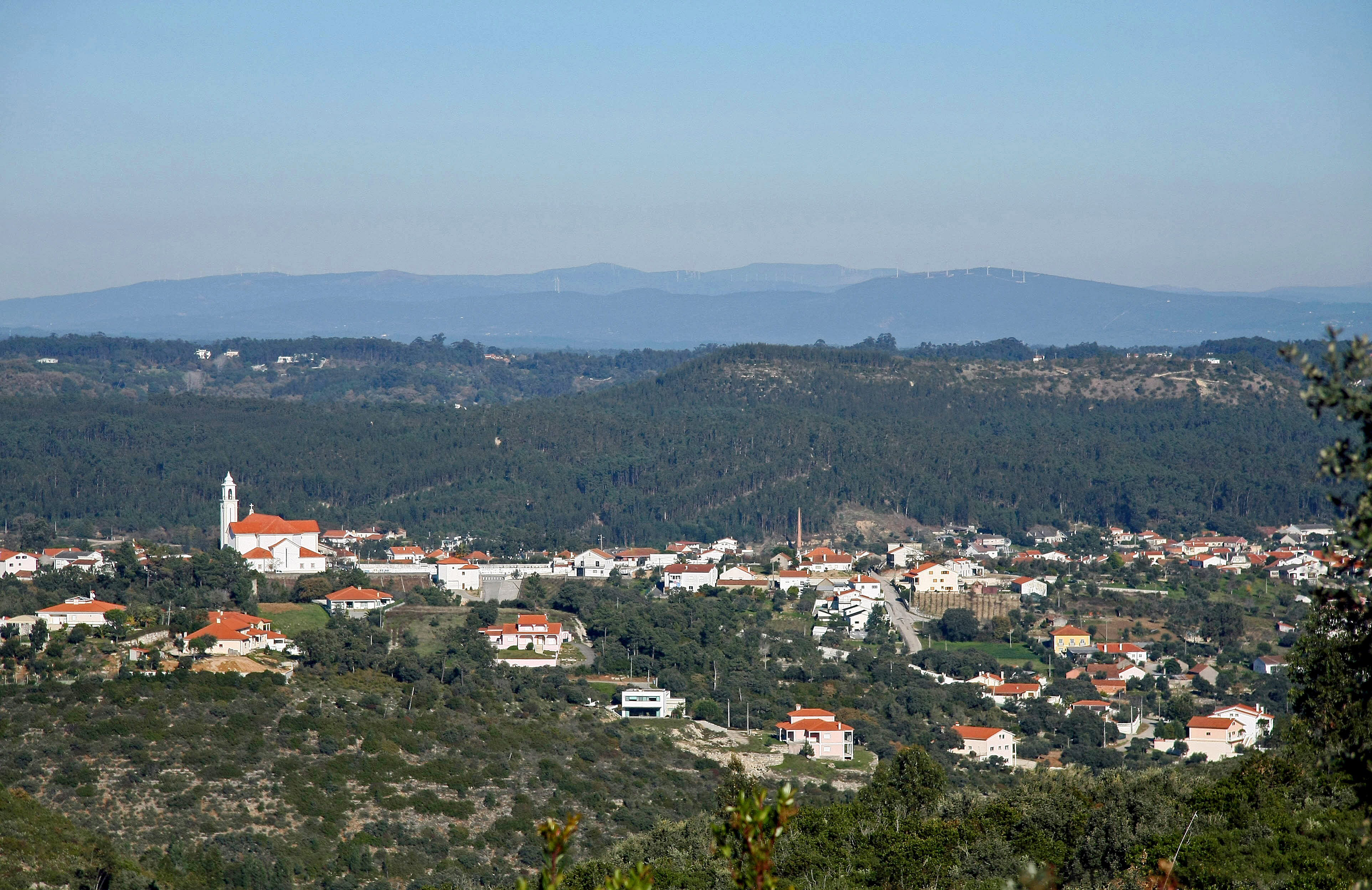

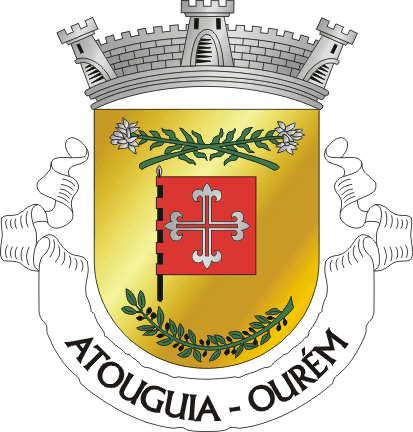
- Coat of arms

- Location in Portugal
- Coordinates: 39°38′47″N 8°37′23″W
- Country: Portugal
- Region: Oeste e Vale do Tejo
- Intermunic. comm.: Médio Tejo
- District: Santarém
- Municipality: Ourém

Area
  - Total: 19.55 km^{2} (7.55 sq mi)

Population (2011)
  - Total: 2,454
  - Density: 125.5/km^{2} (325.1/sq mi)
- Time zone: UTC+00:00 (WET)
  - Summer (DST): UTC+01:00 (WEST)

Atouguia (European Portuguese: [ɐtoˈɣi.ɐ]) is a civil parish in the municipality of Ourém, Portugal. The population in 2011 was 2,454, in an area of 19.55 km².
