= Nossa Senhora das Misericórdias =

- Civil parish
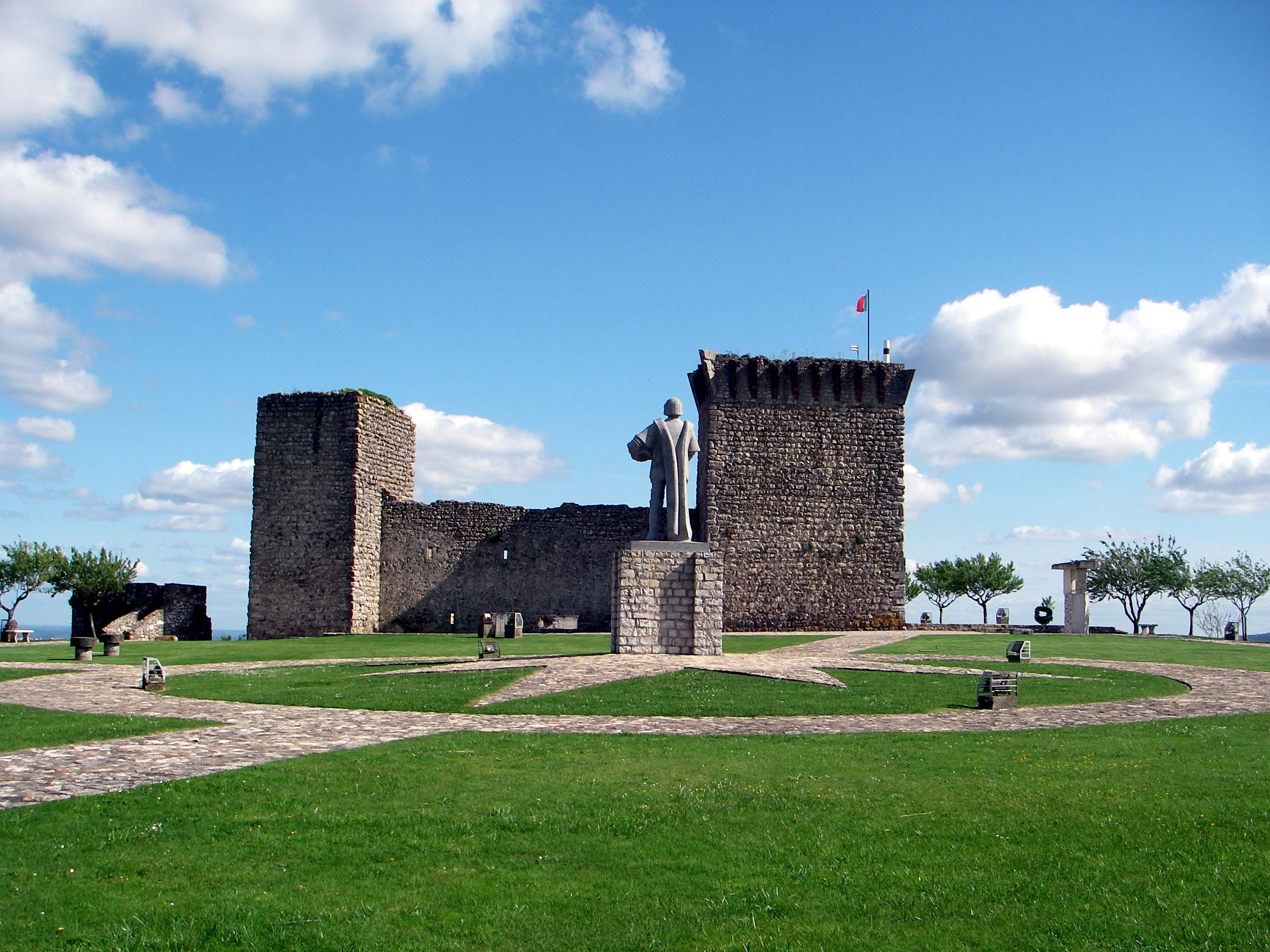

- Location in Portugal
- Coordinates: 39°37′09″N 8°34′48″W
- Country: Portugal
- Region: Oeste e Vale do Tejo
- Intermunic. comm.: Médio Tejo
- District: Santarém
- Municipality: Ourém

Area
  - Total: 42.35 km^{2} (16.35 sq mi)

Population (2011)
  - Total: 5,077
  - Density: 119.9/km^{2} (310.5/sq mi)
- Time zone: UTC+00:00 (WET)
  - Summer (DST): UTC+01:00 (WEST)

Nossa Senhora das Misericórdias is a civil parish in the municipality of Ourém, Portugal. The population in 2011 was 5,077, in an area of 42.35 km^{2}.
