= Freixianda, Ribeira do Farrio e Formigais =

- Civil parish
- Location in Portugal
- Coordinates: 39.76°N 8.47°W
- Country: Portugal
- Region: Oeste e Vale do Tejo
- Intermunic. comm.: Médio Tejo
- District: Santarém
- Municipality: Ourém

Area
  - Total: 64.23 km^{2} (24.80 sq mi)

Population (2011)
  - Total: 3,693
  - Density: 57.50/km^{2} (148.9/sq mi)
- Time zone: UTC+00:00 (WET)
  - Summer (DST): UTC+01:00 (WEST)

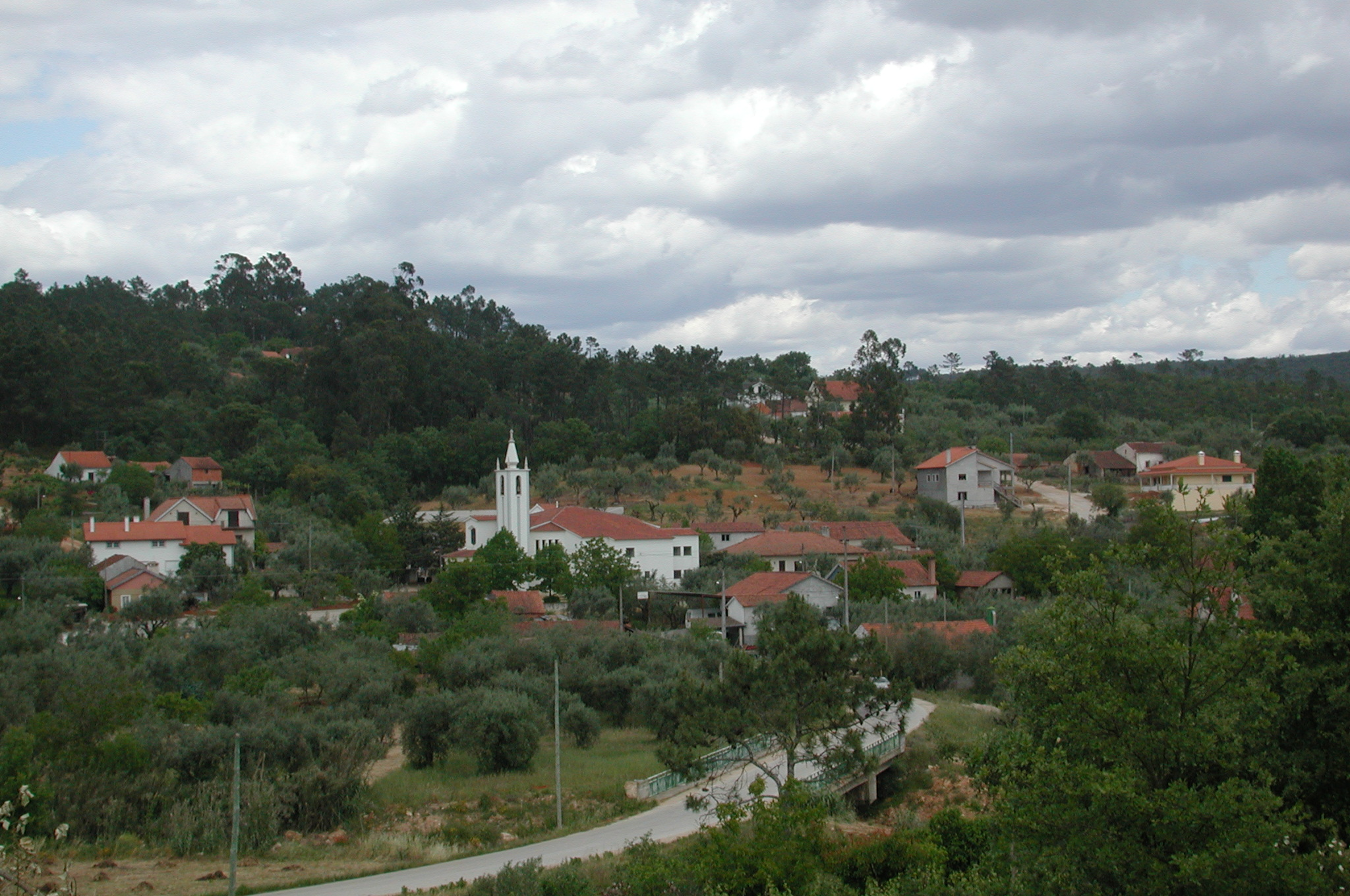
Igreja da Colegiada (Collegiate Church), parish church of Formigais, Ourém. Built in 1453, it was rebuilt in the 18th century after it was destroyed by an earthquake.

Freixianda, Ribeira do Farrio e Formigais is a civil parish in the municipality of Ourém, Portugal. It was formed in 2013 by the merger of the former parishes Freixianda, Ribeira do Farrio and Formigais. The population in 2011 was 3,693, in an area of 64.23 km².
