= Urqueira =

- Civil parish
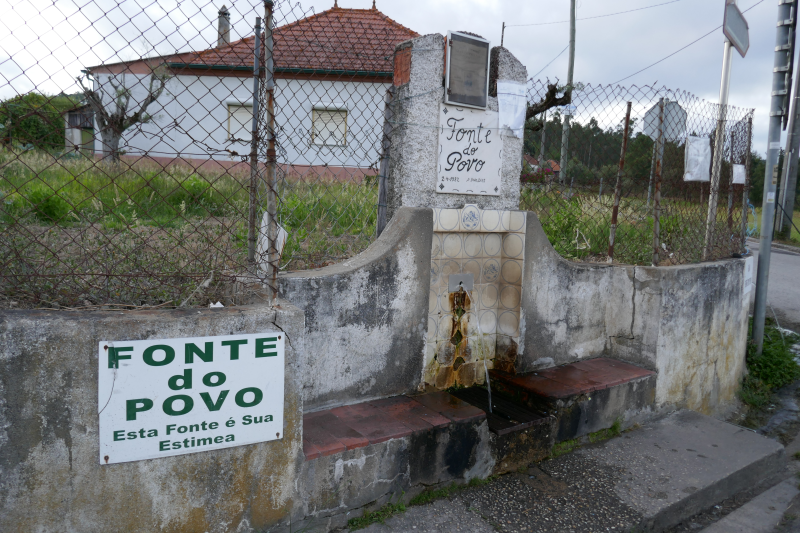

- Location in Portugal
- Coordinates: 39°43′48″N 8°35′43″W
- Country: Portugal
- Region: Oeste e Vale do Tejo
- Intermunic. comm.: Médio Tejo
- District: Santarém
- Municipality: Ourém

Area
  - Total: 31.28 km^{2} (12.08 sq mi)

Population (2021)
  - Total: 1,401
  - Density: 44.79/km^{2} (116.0/sq mi)
- Time zone: UTC+00:00 (WET)
  - Summer (DST): UTC+01:00 (WEST)

Urqueira (Portuguese: [uɾˈkɐjɾɐ]) is a civil parish in the municipality of Ourém, Portugal. The population in 2021 was 1,401, down from 1,682 in 2011, in an area of 31.28 km^{2}.
