= Alburitel =

- Civil parish
- Location in Portugal
- Coordinates: 39°38′51″N 8°31′18″W
- Country: Portugal
- Region: Oeste e Vale do Tejo
- Intermunic. comm.: Médio Tejo
- District: Santarém
- Municipality: Ourém

Area
  - Total: 11.51 km^{2} (4.44 sq mi)

Population (2011)
  - Total: 1,179
  - Density: 102.4/km^{2} (265.3/sq mi)
- Time zone: UTC+00:00 (WET)
  - Summer (DST): UTC+01:00 (WEST)

Found image,

Alburitel is a civil parish in the municipality of Ourém, Portugal. The population in 2011 was 1,179, in an area of 11.51 km^{2}.
