= Seiça =

- Civil parish
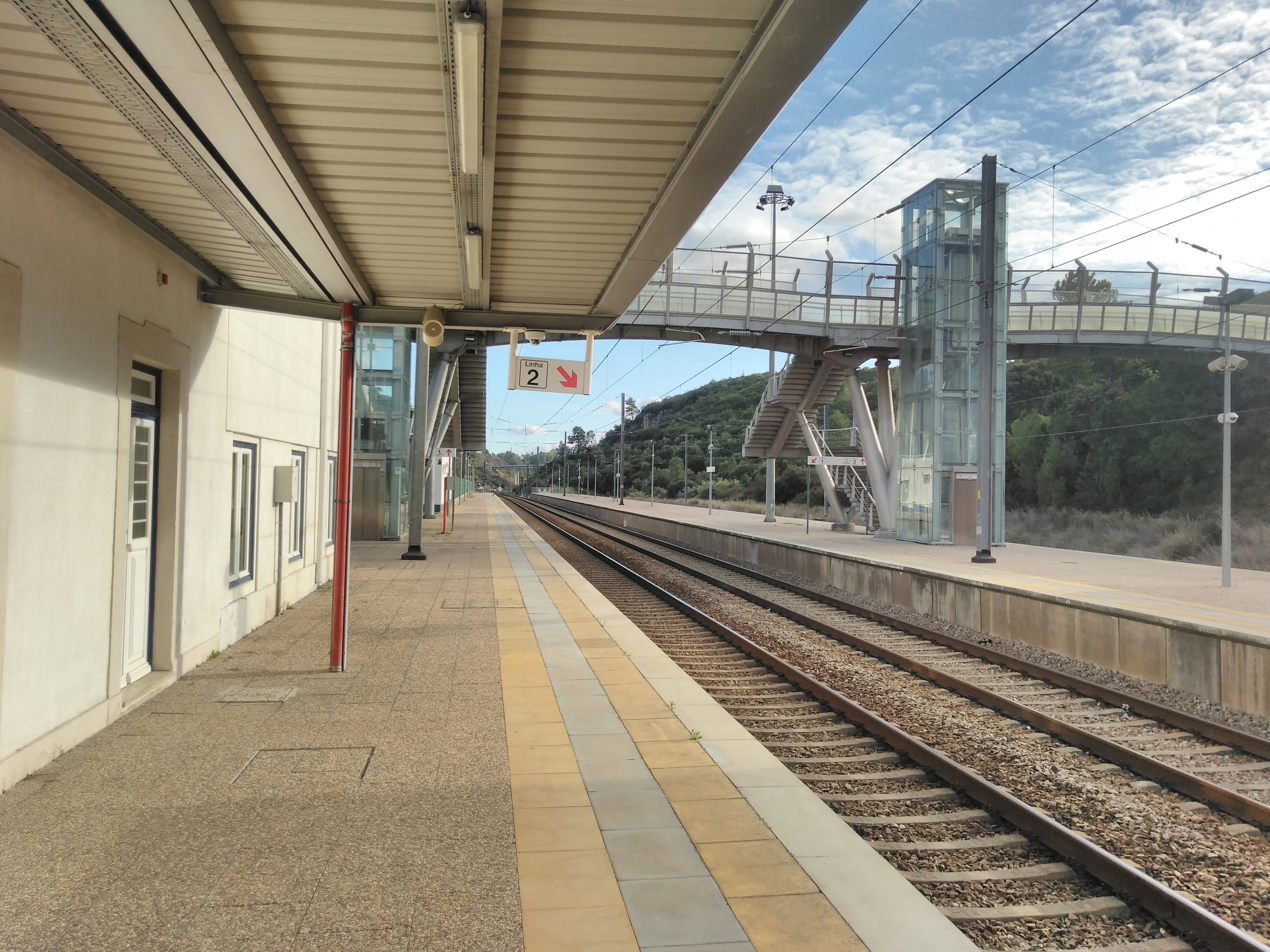

- Location in Portugal
- Coordinates: 39°40′30″N 8°31′27″W
- Country: Portugal
- Region: Oeste e Vale do Tejo
- Intermunic. comm.: Médio Tejo
- District: Santarém
- Municipality: Ourém

Area
  - Total: 25.14 km^{2} (9.71 sq mi)

Population (2021)
  - Total: 1,879
  - Density: 74.74/km^{2} (193.6/sq mi)
- Time zone: UTC+00:00 (WET)
  - Summer (DST): UTC+01:00 (WEST)

Seiça (European Portuguese: [ˈsɐjsɐ]) is a civil parish in the municipality of Ourém, Portugal. The population in 2021 was 1,879, down from 2,076 in 2011, in an area of 25.14 km^{2}.
