= Nossa Senhora da Piedade =

- Civil parish
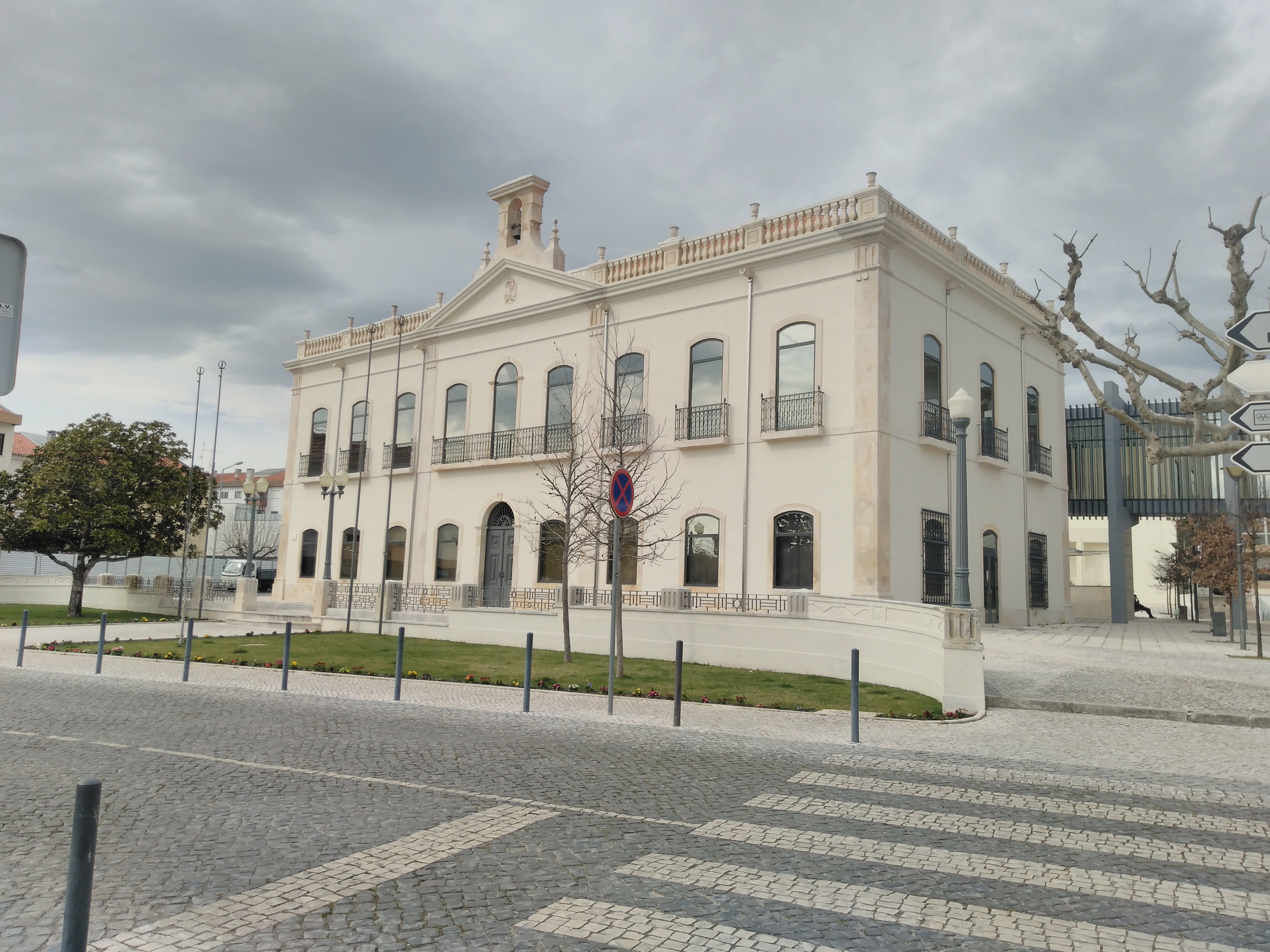
- Ourém City Hall

- Location in Portugal
- Coordinates: 39°40′14″N 8°34′35″W
- Country: Portugal
- Region: Oeste e Vale do Tejo
- Intermunic. comm.: Médio Tejo
- District: Santarém
- Municipality: Ourém

Area
  - Total: 20.52 km^{2} (7.92 sq mi)

Population (2021)
  - Total: 7,250
  - Density: 353/km^{2} (915/sq mi)
- Time zone: UTC+00:00 (WET)
  - Summer (DST): UTC+01:00 (WEST)

Nossa Senhora da Piedade is a civil parish in the municipality of Ourém, Portugal. The population in 2021 was 7,250, up from 7,217 in 2011, in an area of 20.52 km^{2}.
