= Fátima, Portugal =

Fátima
- Civil parish
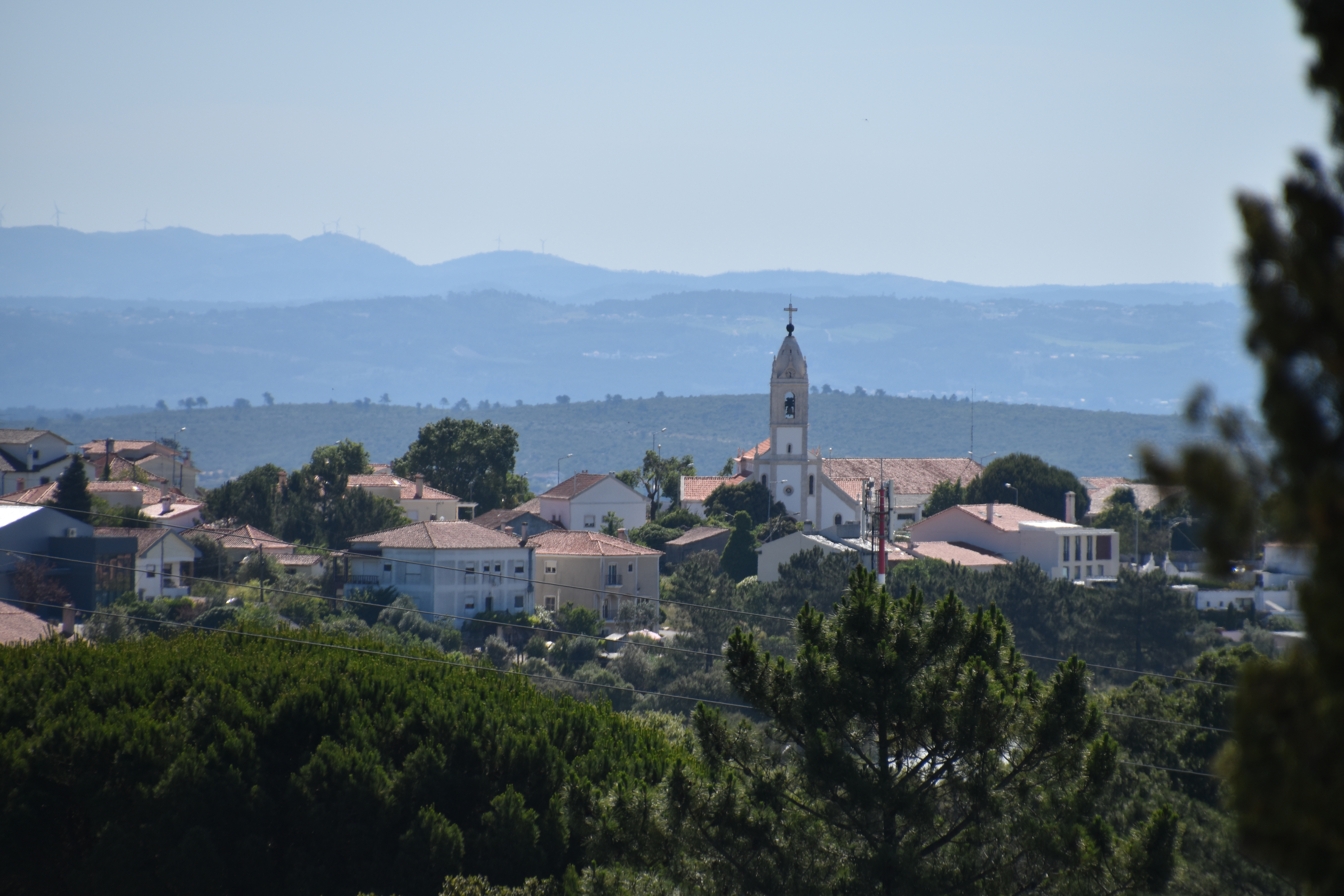
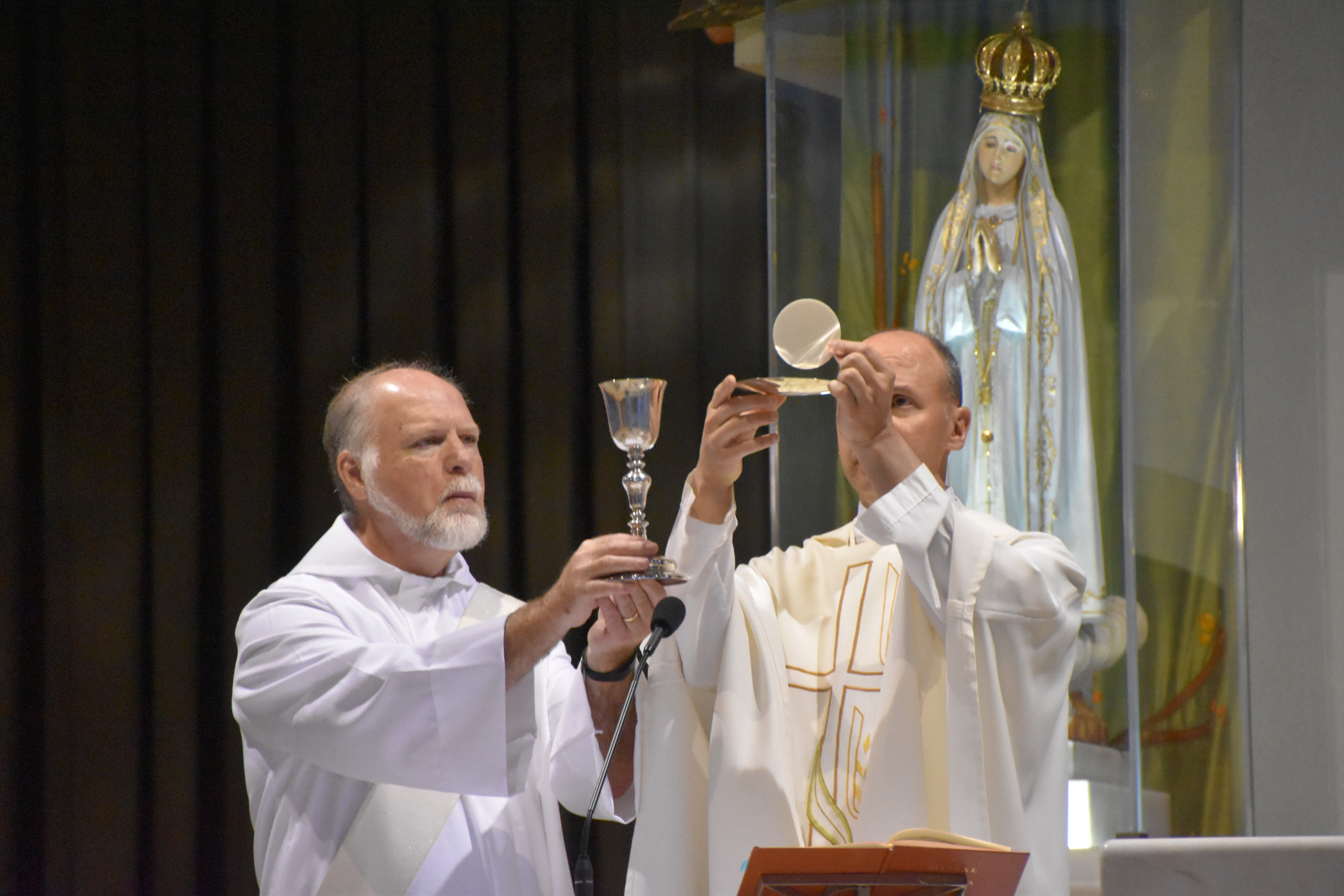
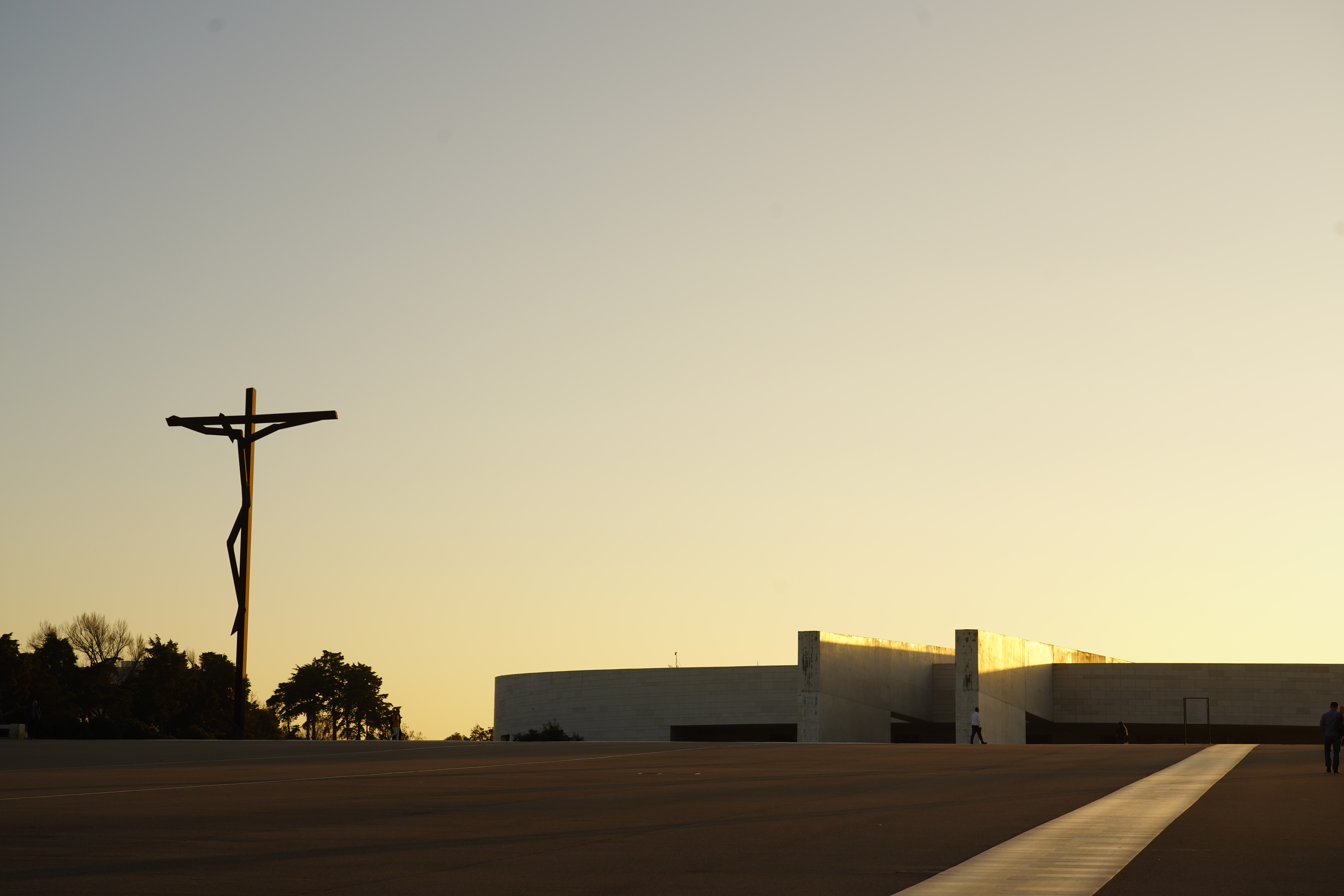
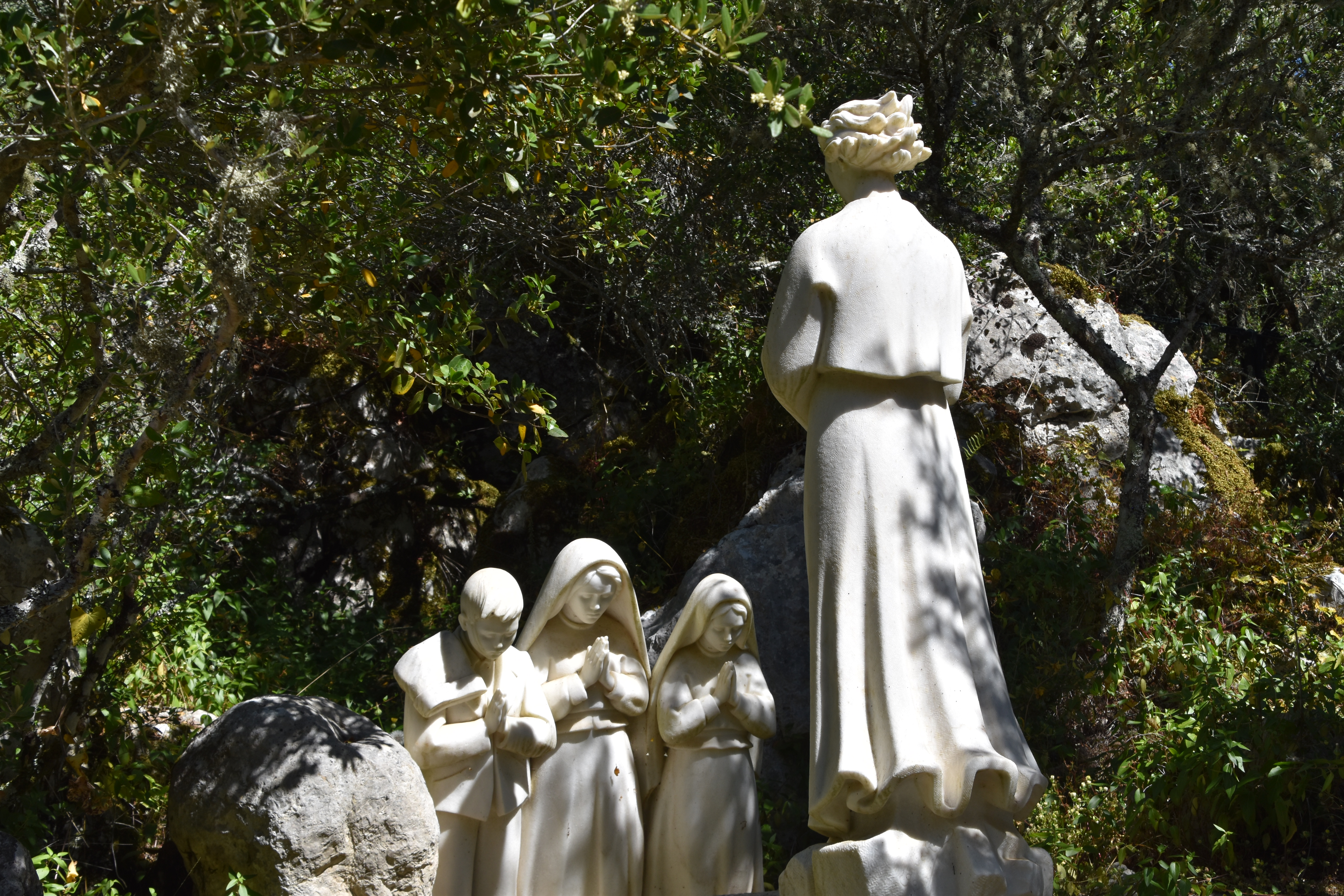
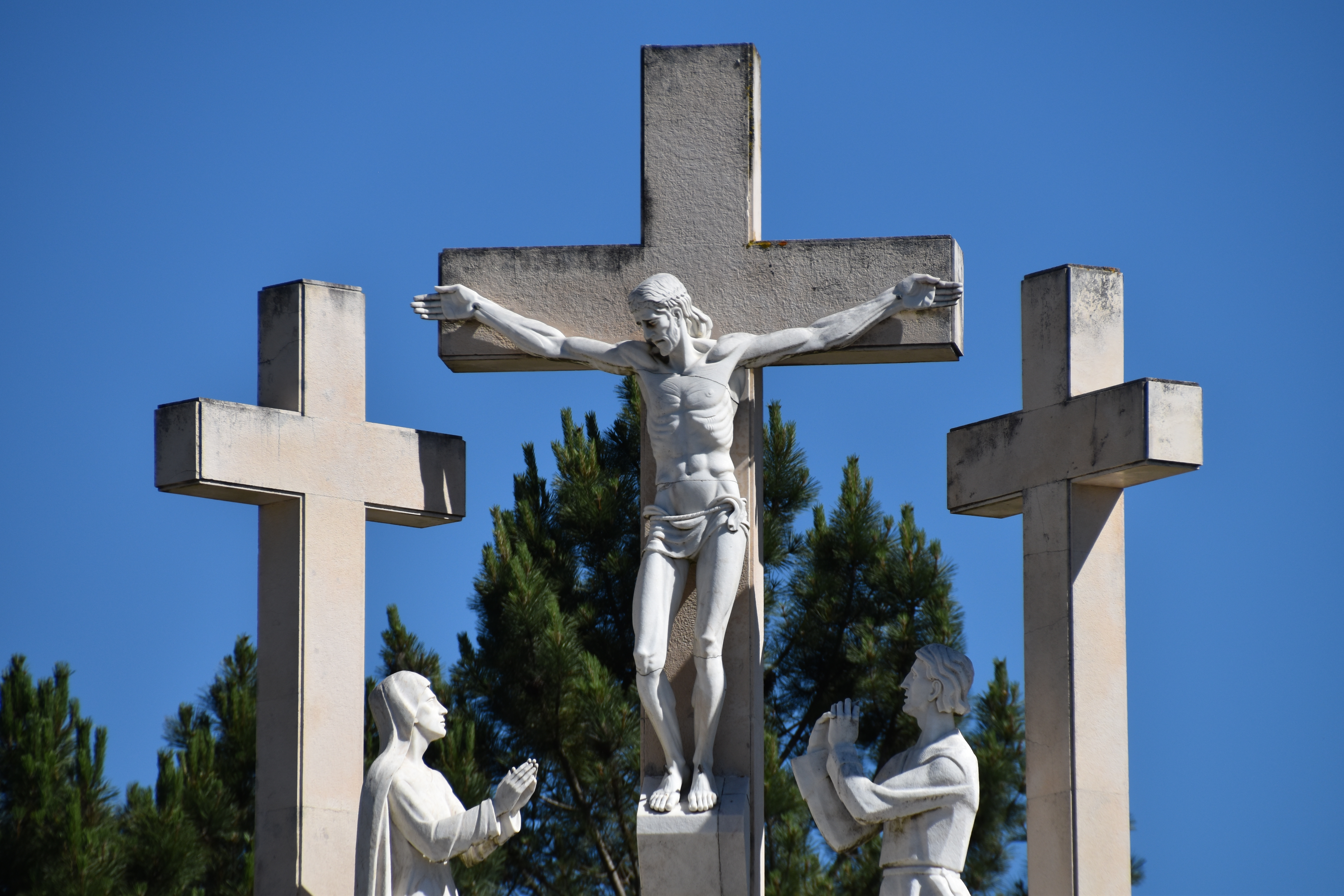
- From top left to right: the Sanctuary of Our Lady of Fátima in Cova da Iria, the old village of Fátima, the Chapel of the Apparitions, the Basilica of the Most Holy Trinity, the statue of the Guardian Angel of Portugal and the Hungarian Calvary in Valinhos

- Flag Coat of arms

- Location in Portugal
- Coordinates: 39°37′32″N 08°39′57″W
- Country: Portugal
- Region: Oeste e Vale do Tejo
- Intermunic. comm.: Médio Tejo
- District: Santarém
- Municipality: Ourém

Area
  - Total: 71.29 km^{2} (27.53 sq mi)
- Elevation: 356 m (1,168 ft)

Population (2021)
  - Total: 13,212 ▲
  - Density: 185.3/km^{2} (480.0/sq mi)
- Time zone: UTC+00:00 (WET)
  - Summer (DST): UTC+01:00 (WEST)
- Postal code: 2495
- Area code: 249
- Patron: Our Lady of Pleasures; Our Lady of Fátima
- Website: www.freguesiadefatima.pt

Fátima (Portuguese pronunciation: [ˈfatimɐ]) is a city in the municipality of Ourém and district of Santarém in the Oeste e Vale do Tejo Region of Portugal, with 71.29 km^{2} of area and 13,212 inhabitants (2021). The homonymous civil parish encompasses several villages and localities of which the city of Fátima is the largest.

The civil parish has been permanently associated with Our Lady of Fátima, a series of 1917 Marian apparitions that were purportedly witnessed by three local shepherd children at the Cova da Iria. The Catholic Church later recognized these events as "worthy of belief". A small chapel was built at the site of the apparition in 1919, and a statue of the Virgin Mary installed. The chapel and statue have since been enclosed within the Sanctuary of Our Lady of Fátima, a shrine complex containing two minor basilicas. Associated facilities for pilgrims, including a hotel and medical centre, have also been built over the decades within and around the Marian Shrine. The city has become an important international destination for religious tourists, receiving between 6 and 8 million pilgrims yearly.

== History ==
=== Name origin ===
The name of the town and parish is a rendition of the Arabic given name Fátima (فاطمة Fāṭimah) which also happens to be the name of the daughter of Islamic Prophet Muhammad. According to the traditional narrative, Fátima was said to be the name of a Moorish princess kidnapped by a knight, Gonçalo Hermigues, and his companions. Hermigues took her to a small village in the Serra de Aire hills, in the recently established Kingdom of Portugal. Fatima fell in love with her kidnapper and decided to convert to Christianity to marry him. She was baptized and given the Christian name "Oureana". However, the place name recalls the princess' original Arab name rather than her Christian one.

=== Marian apparitions and "Sun miracle" ===
The parish was founded in 1568, when it was annexed by the Collegiate of Ourém (Portuguese: Colegiada de Ourém). For centuries, most of the villagers kept herds of sheep and depended on subsistence farming.

Since the 18th century, Fátima has been associated with events related to Marian apparitions. The first supposed apparition dates back to the mid 18th century in Ortiga, now a quarter of Fátima, when, according to popular belief, the Virgin Mary appeared to a young, mute shepherdess and asked for one of her sheep, causing the girl to speak in response. This event supposedly incited the creation of the Sanctuary of Our Lady of Ortiga in 1758, which, in 1801, prompted Pope Pius VII to grant an indulgence to all pilgrims visiting the Marian shrine.

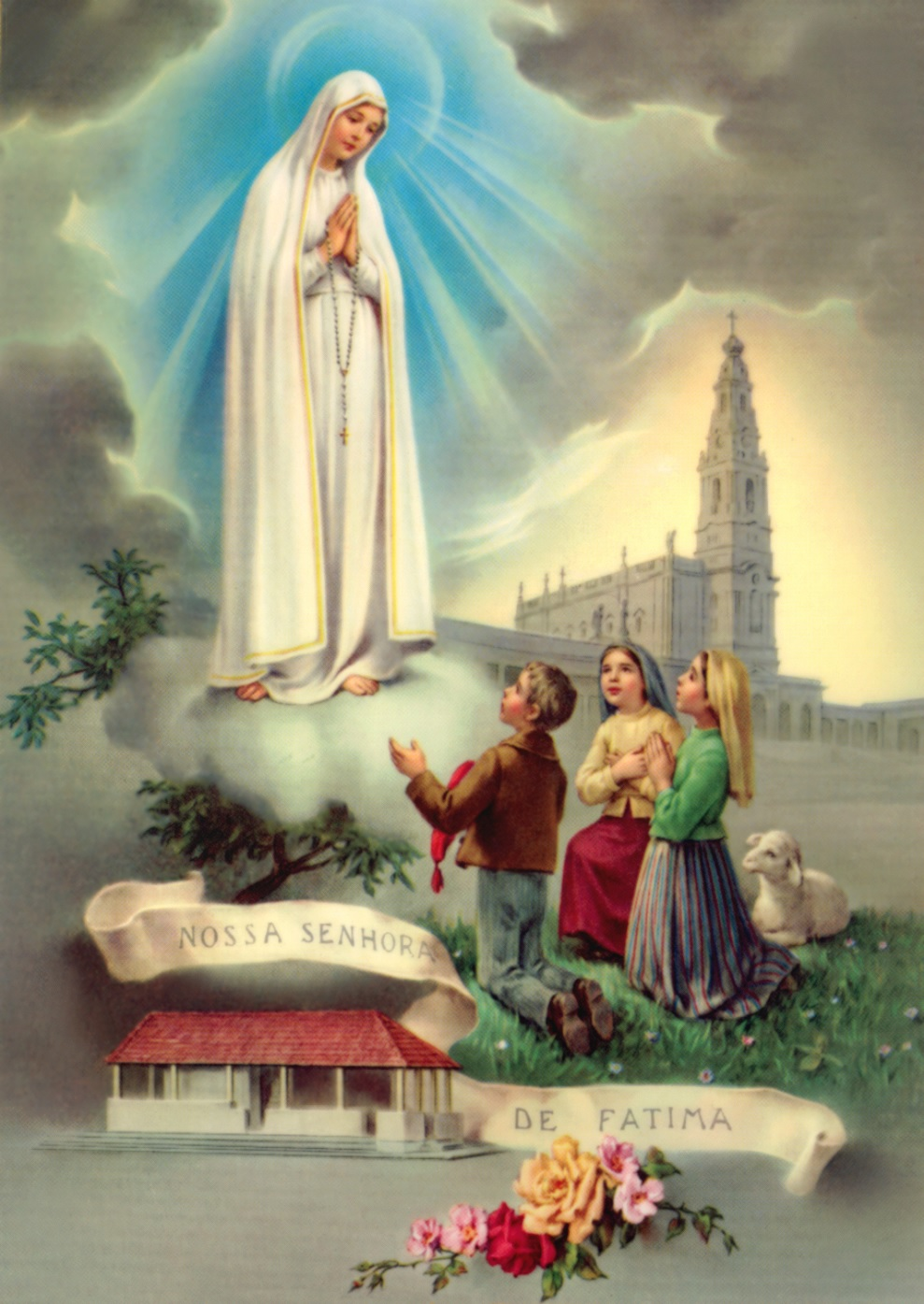
Old religious card with the apparition of the Virgin Mary in Fatima, Portugal

Later in the early 20th century, a similar event took place in which three local children, Lúcia dos Santos and her cousins, Francisco and Jacinta Marto, purportedly saw visions of a woman known as Our Lady of Fátima, since believed by the Catholic Church to be the Virgin Mary. On 13 May 1917, whilst guarding their families' sheep in the Cova da Iria, the children first claimed to have seen an apparition of a "lady dressed in white" and shining with a bright light.

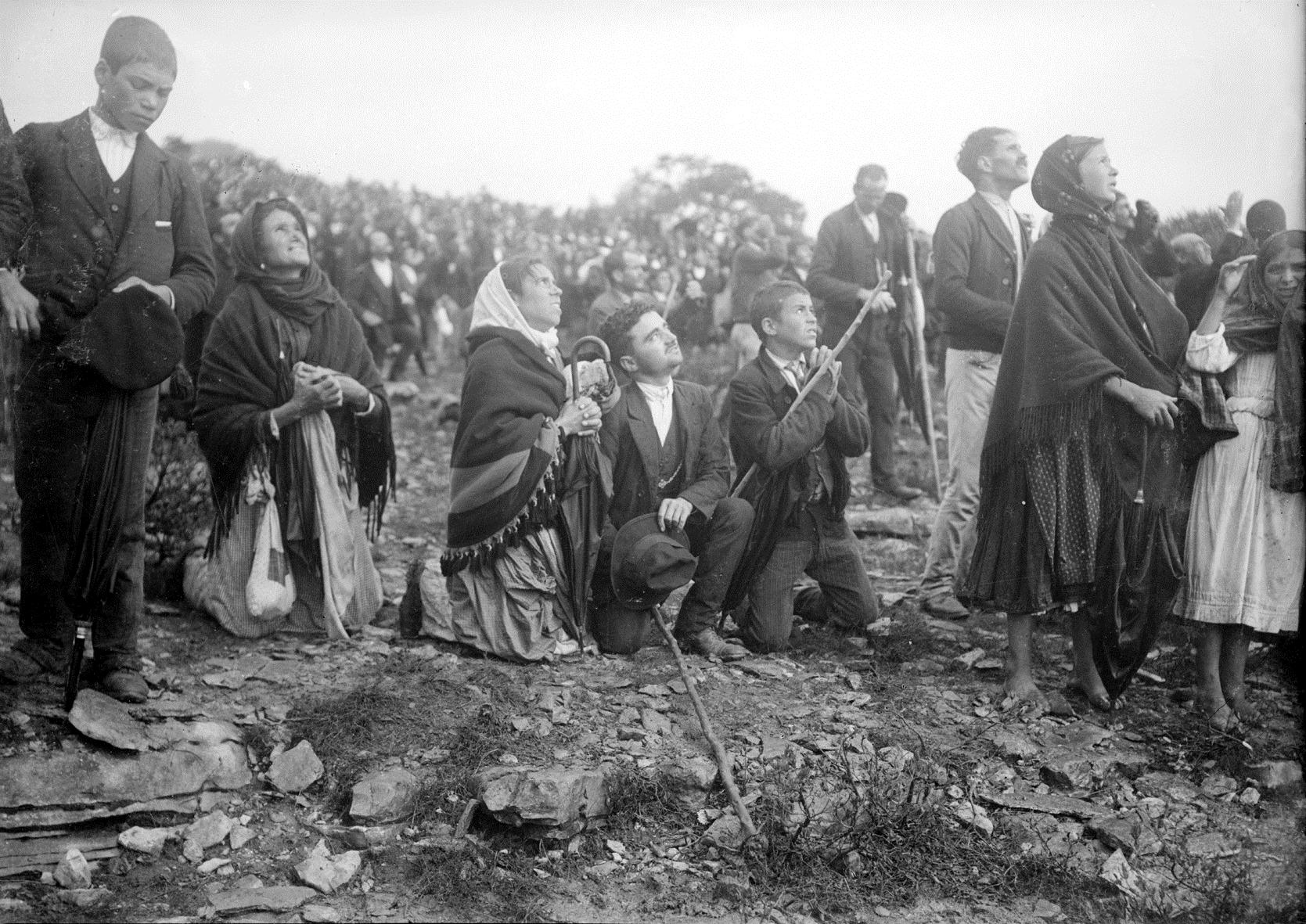
A close-up of the Christian pilgrims during the Miracle of the Sun on 13 October 1917

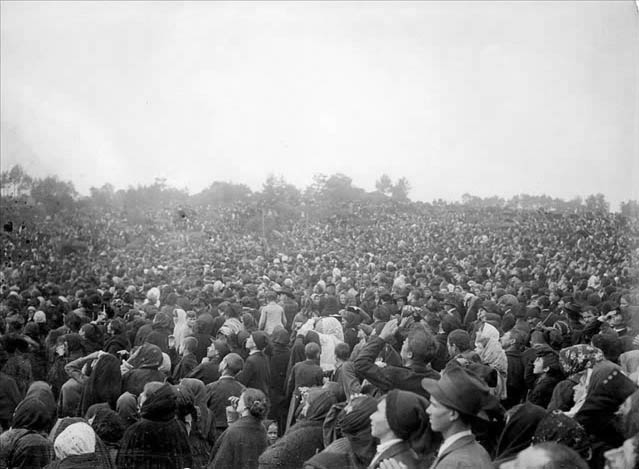
An image of the crowd during the last apparition in Cova da Iria

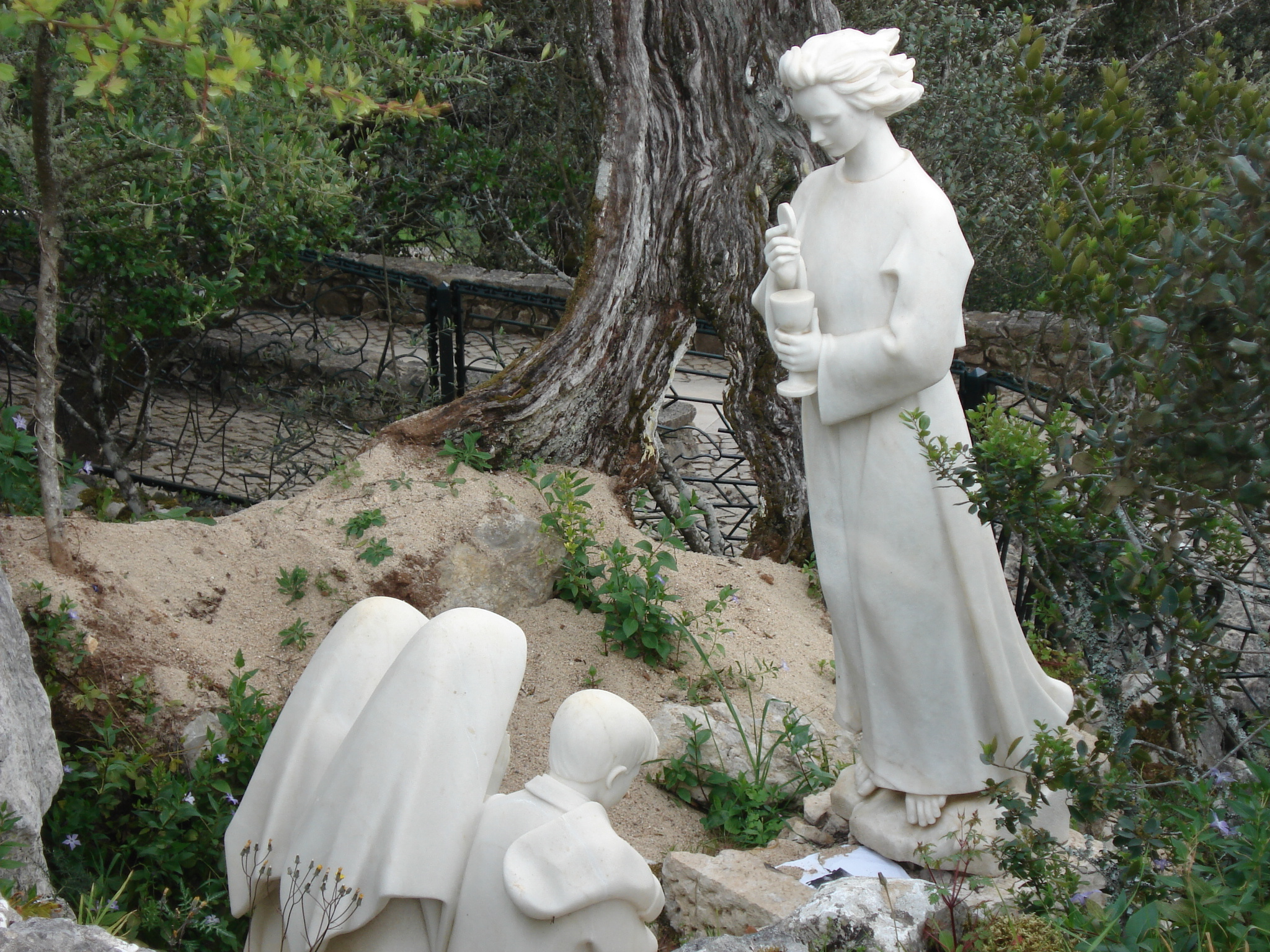
Monument of the Guardian Angel of Portugal apparition to the three little shepherd children of Fátima

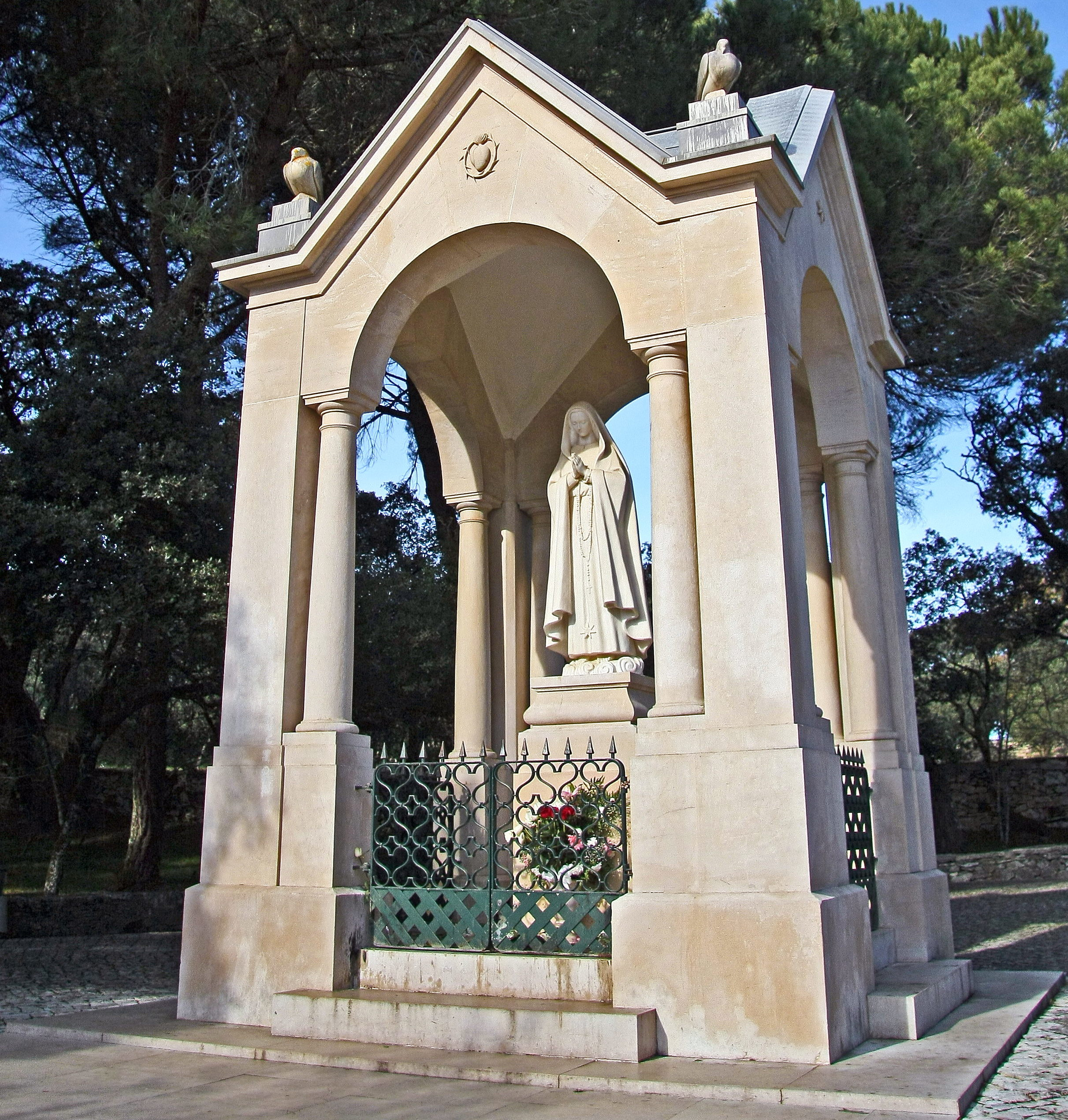
Statue dedicated to the apparition of Our Lady which occurred exceptionally in Valinhos, near the Cova da Iria

The three shepherd children were born in Aljustrel, a small hamlet about 1 kilometre (0.62 mi) from Fátima. To the west, near Aljustrel, is Loca do Cabeço, a smaller agglomeration of rocky outcroppings where, in 1916, an angel appeared twice to the three children. The children claimed to have seen the Marian apparition on six occasions; they said the last would be 13 October 1917. An estimated 70,000 pilgrims went to the site for the last prophesied apparition in October. Some of them reported what has been referred to as the Miracle of the Sun, when some observers reported it appeared to be behaving unusually.

The local bishop investigated the events and determined that the apparitions were worthy of belief. The site was marked by a cross erected by locals. In 1918 they built a small chapel of rock and limestone and covered in tile. It was 3.3 metres (11 ft) by 2.8 metres (9.2 ft) length, and 2.85 metres (9.4 ft) height. It became a centre for Marian devotion, receiving names such as a fé de Fátima, cidade da Paz ("the faith of Fátima, City of Peace"), or Terra de Milagres e Aparições ("Land of Miracles and Apparitions"). The focus of Fatima as a place for peace pilgrimages developed in World War II when Lucia's messages were linked to the conflict.

The chapel has since been enclosed within a large basilica and sanctuary, part of a complex including a hotel and other facilities. In 1930, the statue of Our Lady in the Chapel of Apparitions was crowned by the Vatican.

Francisco died in 1919 and Jacinta in 1920, during the international Spanish flu pandemic. Lucia dos Santos became a nun and lived until 2005. The two who died young were beatified on 13 May 2000 by Pope John Paul II, and were canonised by Pope Francis on 13 May 2017, the hundredth anniversary of the first apparition.

=== Subsequent development ===
The construction of the sanctuary and the steady visits by pilgrims stimulated local development. In addition to construction of a large shrine, basilica, and sanctuary, the complex includes a hotel and other facilities. The town of Fátima was elevated to the status of city on 12 July 1997.

In the early 21st century, numerous residents of the parish (primarily from its business sector) worked to have Fátima designated as an independent municipality. The project, led by Júlio Silva, engineer and ex-president of the Junta de Freguesia (Parish Council), was vetoed in July 2003 by Portuguese President Jorge Sampaio.

== Geography and climate ==
=== Geography ===
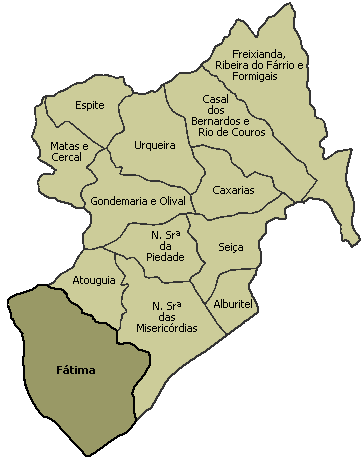
Municipality of Ourém with the parish of Fátima highlighted

Fátima is located in central west Portugal. It borders São Mamede (Batalha) and Minde (Alcanena) to the southwest, Pedrógão and Chancelaria (Torres Novas) in the east, Atouguia and Nossa Senhora das Misericórdias (Ourém) to the north and Santa Catarina da Serra e Chainça (Leiria) to the northwest.

The parish contains the following localities: Aljustrel, Alvaijar, Amoreira, Boleiros, Casa Velha, Casal Farto, Chã, Charneca, Cova da Iria, Eira da Pedra, Fátima, Giesteira, Lombo da Égua, Maxeira, Moimento, Moita Redonda, Moitas, Montelo, Pederneira, Poço de Soudo, Ramila, Vale de Cavalos and Valinho de Fátima.

Fátima sits on a plateau at approximately 356 metres (1,168 ft) above sea level, being at a much higher altitude than the rest of the parishes in Ourém. This plateau represents the northernmost portion of the Estremadura Limestone Massif, which was created during the Middle Jurassic and is characterized by various geological formations including sinkholes, uvalas and polje (like the Polje de Minde-Mata), as well as karst grottoes, caves with stalactites and stalagmites, in addition to lapiez fields. As such, Fátima has geological and cultural similarities with the nature park of Serras de Aire e Candeeiros just south of it.

The soil is characteristically porous which intensifies the already low availability of water in the summer. And even though precipitation in autumn, winter and spring is relatively high, the overall flora is Mediterranean and well adapted to droughts.

The trees in this area are primarily dominated by holly oak (Quercus rotundifolia), Portuguese oak (Quercus faginea), strawberry trees (Arbutus unedo), buckthorn (Rhamnus alaternus), mastic (Pistacia lentiscus), bay laurel (Laurus nobilis) and olive trees, all of which are resistant to both the winter precipitation extremes and the summer drought. There are also areas of savannah, strips of land bounded by walls of loose stone. Pine and eucalyptus forests are also common in the outskirts of the city.

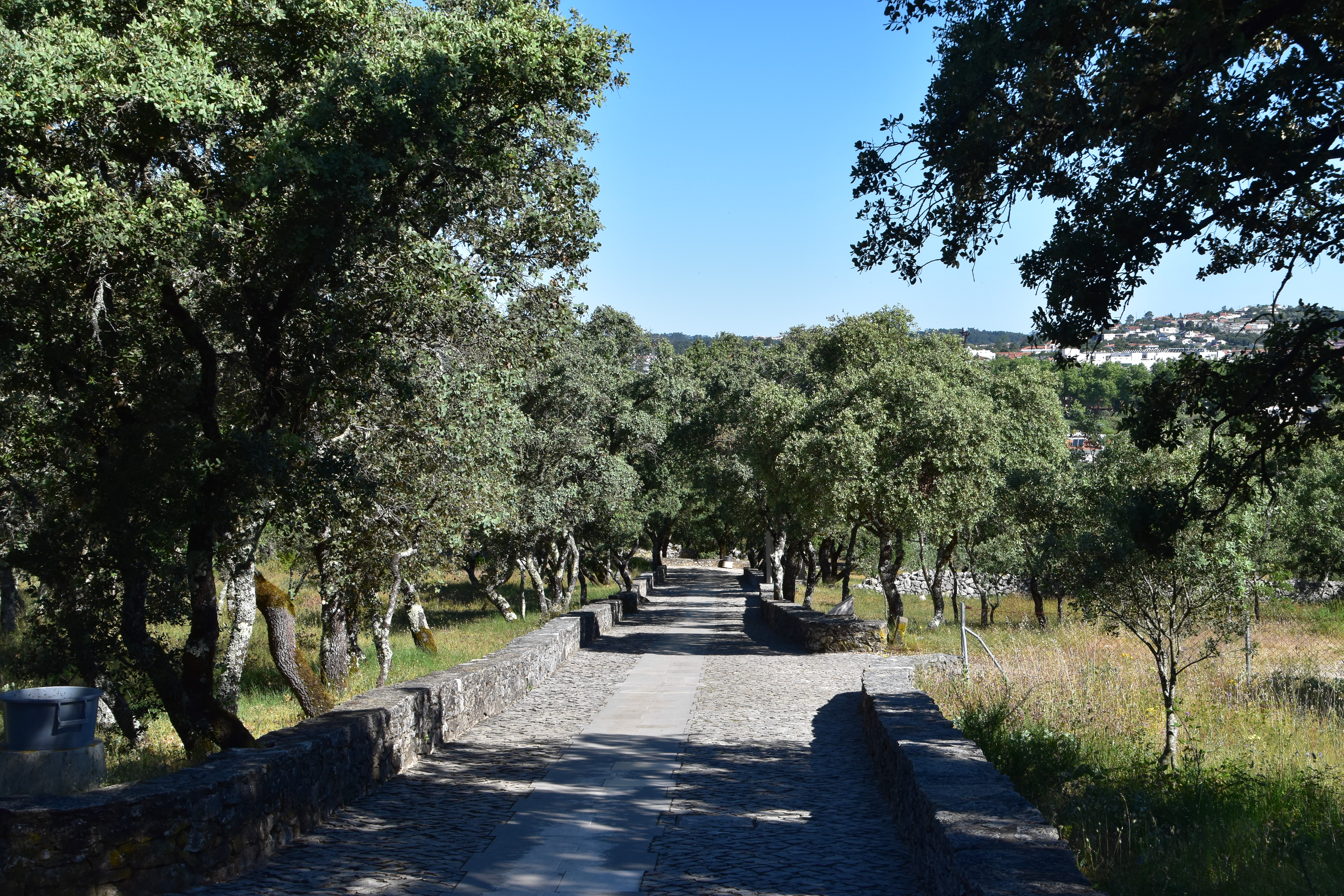
Typical natural landscape

=== Climate ===
Fátima has a warm-summer Mediterranean climate (Köppen: Csb) in transition to a hot-summer (Csa).

The climate is characterized by heavy precipitation during late autumn and winter, with approximately 1,150 millimetres (45 in) annually, and warm, dry summers. Fátima has considerably more precipitation than other cities nearby in part due to its higher altitude, though precipitation in summer is more or less the same.

In the winter, temperatures range between 13 °C (55 °F) on the daytime and 4 °C (39 °F) at night with January being the coldest month. Humid air masses coming from N/NW that come into contact with the plateau of Fátima are the reason behind the strong rains experienced in the low-sun half of the year. Light frosts are typical from late December to mid February and temperatures can get down to −4 °C (25 °F) occasionally.

Summer temperatures range between 27 °C (81 °F) at day and 15 °C (59 °F) at night, but are rather unpredictable, as influences from the marine layer of the nearby Atlantic can often lower the maxima to around 22 °C (72 °F) and thermal lows from the Iberian Peninsula can lead temperatures to surpass 35 °C (95 °F). Temperatures rarely get above 40 °C (104 °F) but when they do they are often accompanied by low humidity which can sometimes lead to unwanted forest fires around the area.

The city has about 2600 hours of annual sunshine. Snow is rare, with the last significant events being in 2016 and 2013, with both snowfall events occurring on February 27th.

Climate data for Boleiros, Fátima, altitude: 320 m (1,050 ft), 1984-2002
Month	Jan	Feb	Mar	Apr	May	Jun	Jul	Aug	Sep	Oct	Nov	Dec	Year
Average precipitation mm (inches)	173.7 (6.84)	124.3 (4.89)	85.1 (3.35)	107.1 (4.22)	88.2 (3.47)	30.7 (1.21)	7.1 (0.28)	7.8 (0.31)	62.5 (2.46)	128.5 (5.06)	160.2 (6.31)	175.7 (6.92)	1,150.9 (45.32)
Source: Portuguese Environment Agency

=== Twin towns – Sister cities ===
Fátima is twinned with:

- Częstochowa in Poland
- Loreto in Italy
- Droß in Austria
- Altötting in Germany
- Lourdes in France
- Selçuk in Turkey

== Economy ==
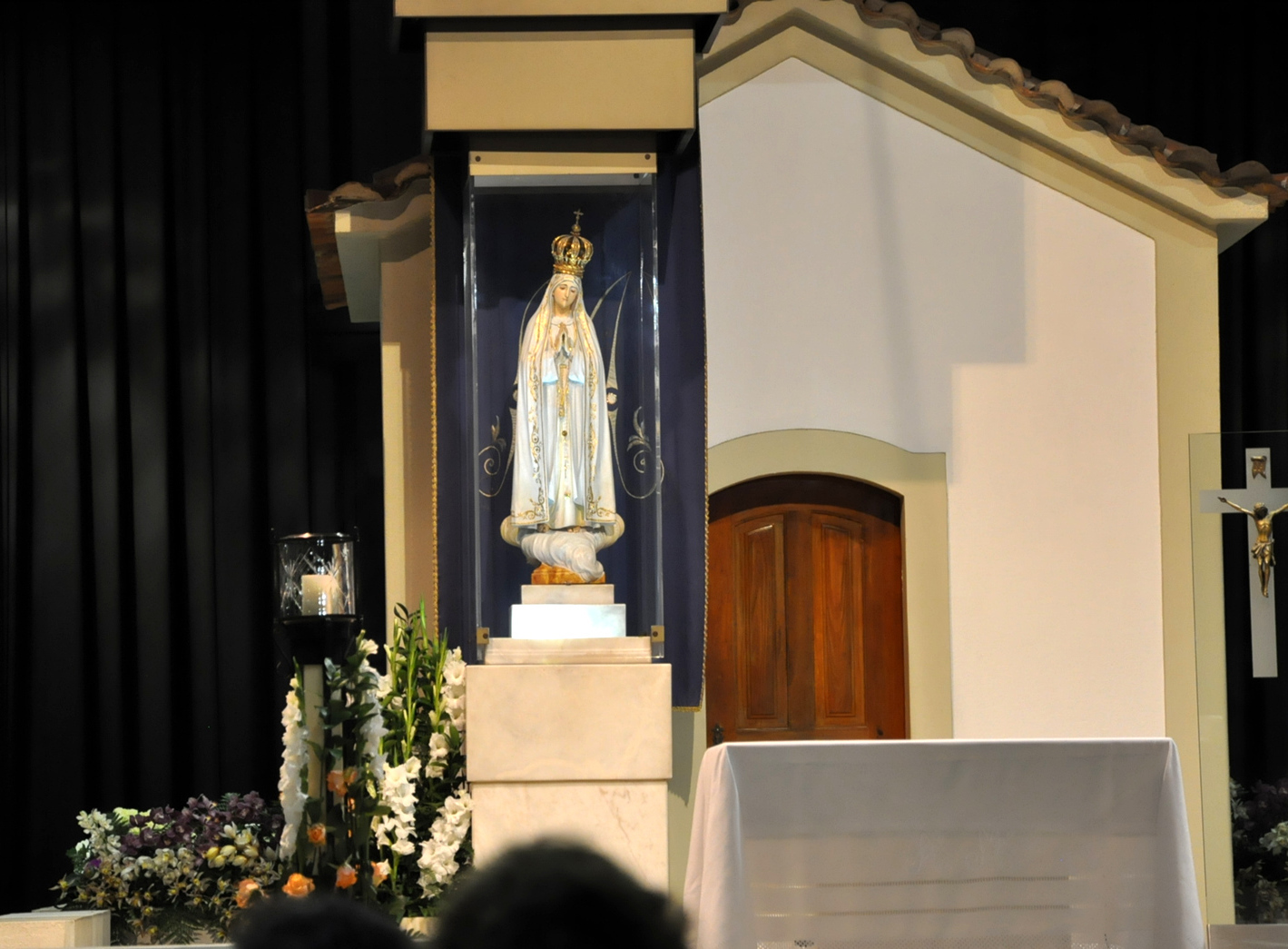
The devotion through Our Lady of Fátima attracts millions of Christian pilgrims to Fátima, in Portugal.

The economy of the city relies on religious tourism because the world devotion through Our Lady of Fátima attracts millions of Christian pilgrims. The locals have numerous shops and stalls devoted to the sale of religious articles and souvenirs. In addition, services for tourists, hotels, restaurants and other retail also benefit from the visitors. Other economic activities in the region include: marble sculpturing, saw-milling, carpentry, civil construction, commerce, and services.

== Papal visits ==
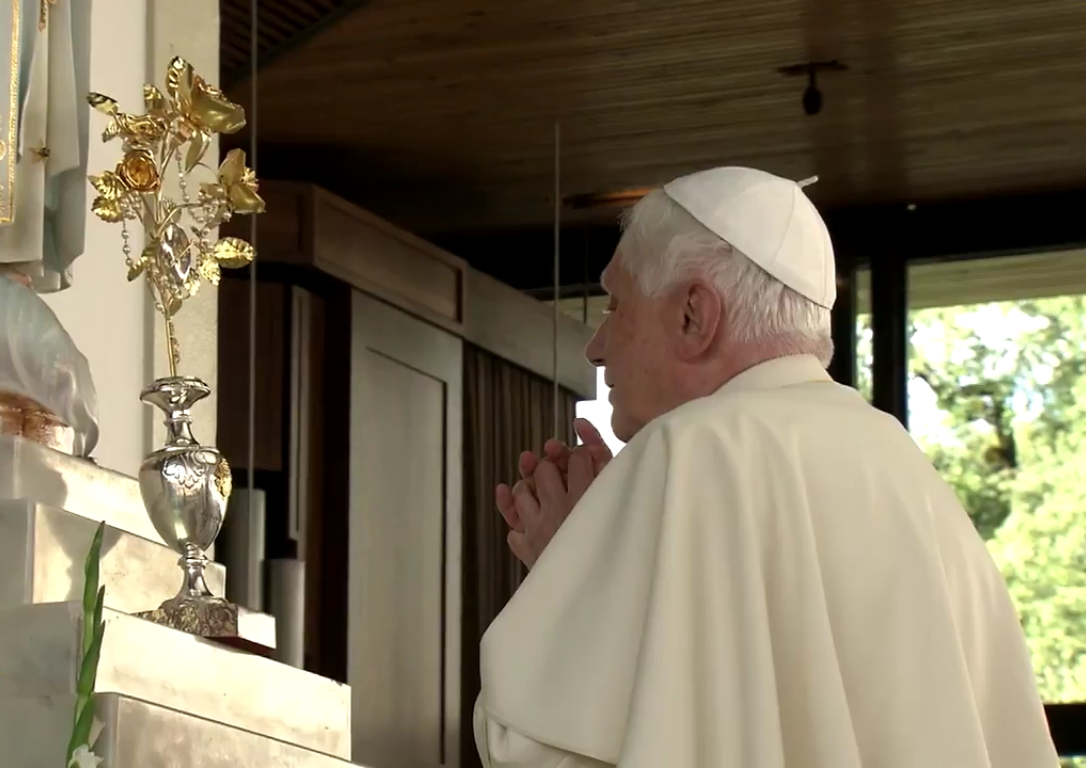
Pope Benedict XVI at the time of the delivery of the second Golden Rose to the Virgin of Fatima in May 2010

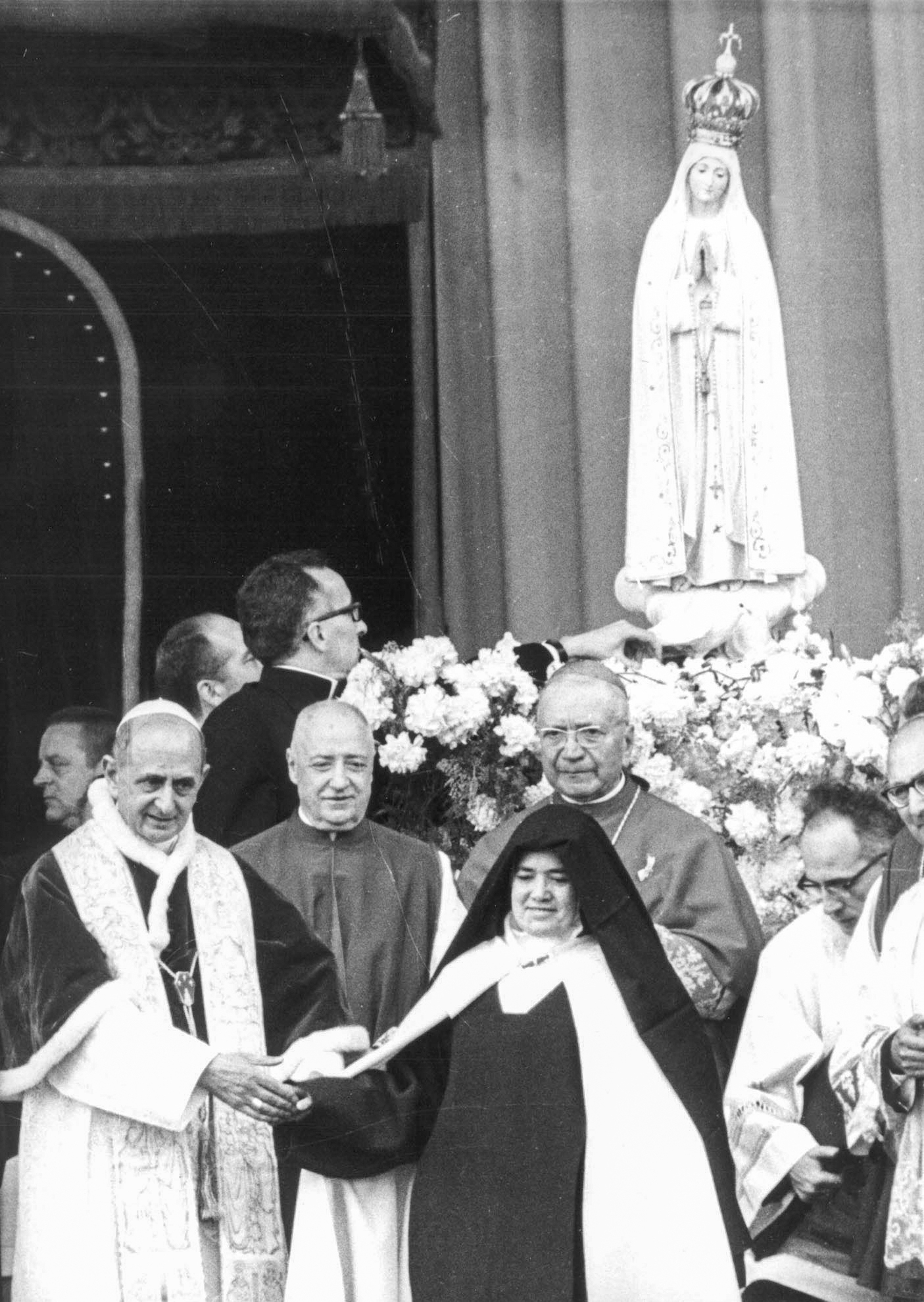
Paul VI with Sister Lúcia, 1967

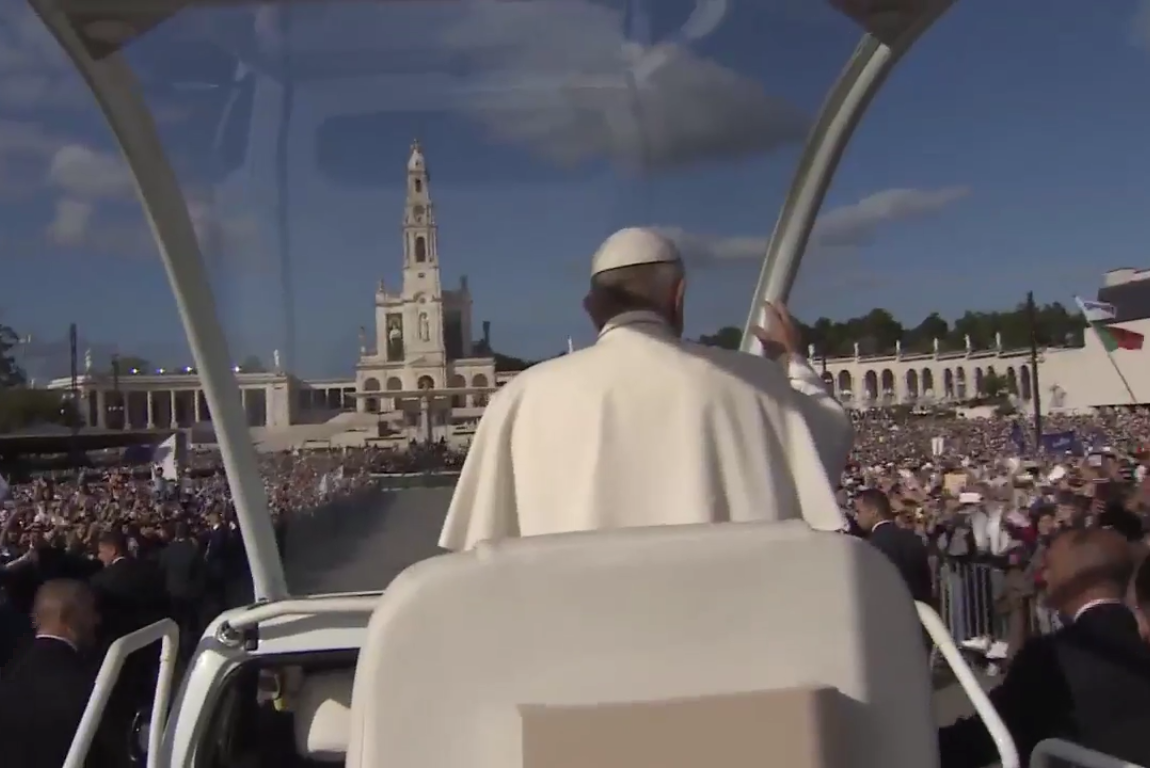
Pope Francis in Fatima, 2017

- May 1967 – Pope Paul VI
- May 1982 – Pope John Paul II (1st visit)
- May 1991 – Pope John Paul II (2nd visit)
- May 2000 – Pope John Paul II (3rd visit)
- May 2010 – Pope Benedict XVI
- May 2017 – Pope Francis (1st visit)
- August 2023 – Pope Francis (2nd visit)

== Architecture ==
=== Civic ===
- Bus station of Fátima (Portuguese: Estação Rodoviária de Fátima)
- Cistern of Gaiola (Portuguese: Cisterna em Gaiola)
- Cistern of Ramila (Portuguese: Cisterna em Ramila)
- Cistern of Capuchos (Portuguese: Cisterna dos Capuchos)
- Civil Parish Building of Fátima (Portuguese: Junta de Freguesia de Fátima)
- Fountain of Alveijar (Portuguese: Fonte do Alveijar)
- Fountain of Lameira (Portuguese: Fonte da Lameira)
- Fountain of Soudo Well (Portuguese: Fonte em Poço de Soudo)
- Fountain of Vale da Pena (Portuguese: Fonte do Vale da Pena)
- Fountain New (Portuguese: Fonte Nova)
- House of Casal Farto (Portuguese: Casa de Casal Farto)
- Main avenue of Fátima (Portuguese: Avenida de Dom José Alves Correia da Silva)
- Mills of Fátima (Portuguese: Moinhos de Fátima)
- Mills of Fazarga (Portuguese: Moinhos da Fazarga)
- Mills of Giesteira (Portuguese: Moinhos da Giesteira)
- Mill of Ortiga (Portuguese: Moinho da Ortiga)
- Monument of the Three Little Shepherds (Portuguese: Monumento dos Pastorinhos - Rotunda Sul de Fátima)
- Old mill of Ramila (Portuguese: Moinho Arruinado em Ramila)
- Olive Oil Press in Estrada das Matas (Portuguese: Lagar de azeite na Estrada das Matas)
- Porch House with Sundial (Portuguese: Casa Alpendrada com relógio de Sol em Casal Farto)
- Residence of Francisco and Jacinta Marto, visionaries of Fátima (Portuguese: Casa de Francisco e Jacinta Marto, videntes de Fátima)
- Residence of Lúcia dos Santos (Portuguese: Casa de Lúcia dos Santos, vidente de Fátima)
- Threshing-floor of Ramila (Portuguese: Eira em Ramila)

=== Religious ===
Panoramic view of the Sanctuary of Our Lady of Fátima (with the Chapel of the Apparitions, the Sacred Heart statue and the Basilica of Our Lady of the Rosary)

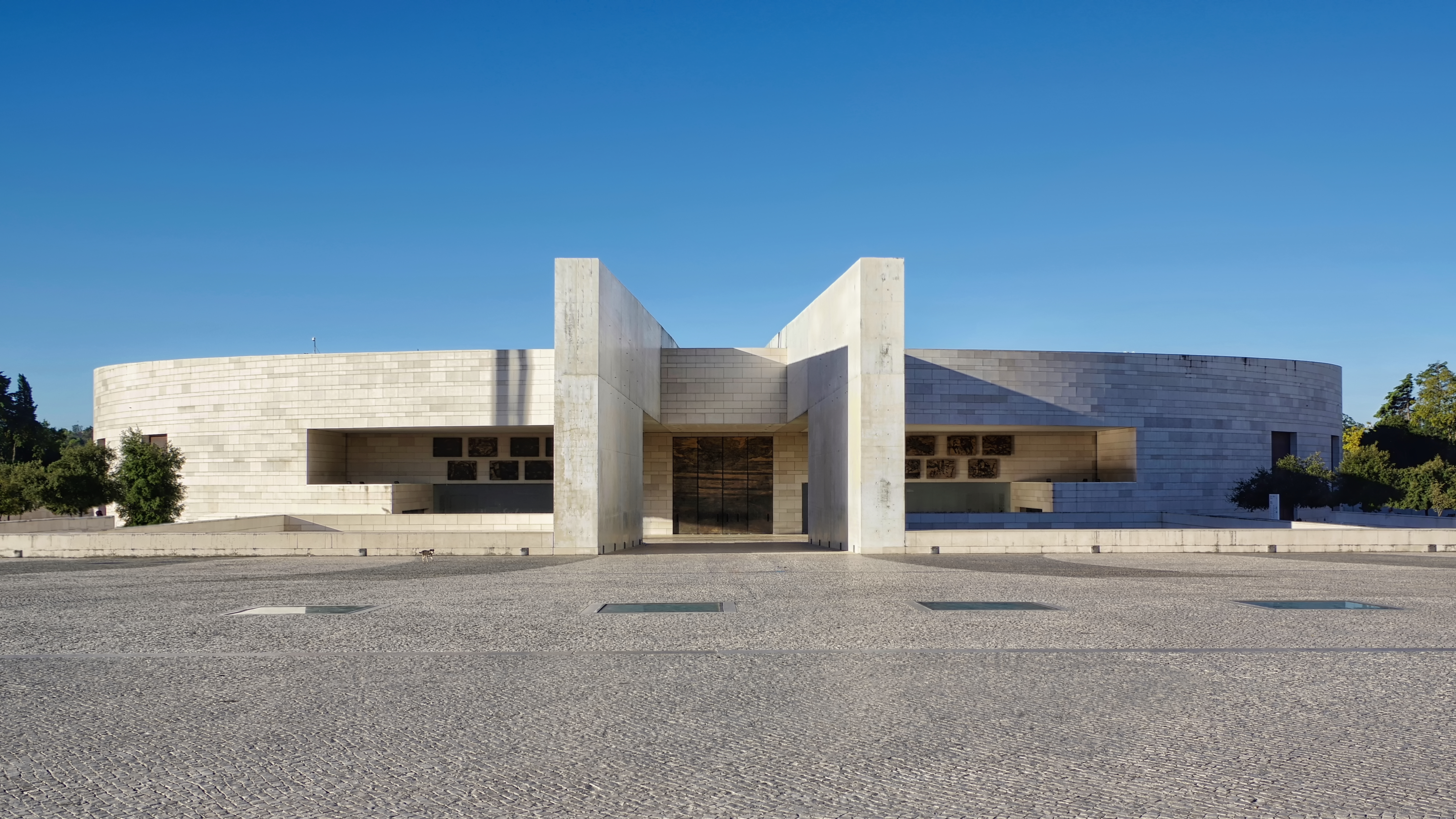
The Basilica of the Most Holy Trinity is the 5th largest Roman Catholic Church in the world

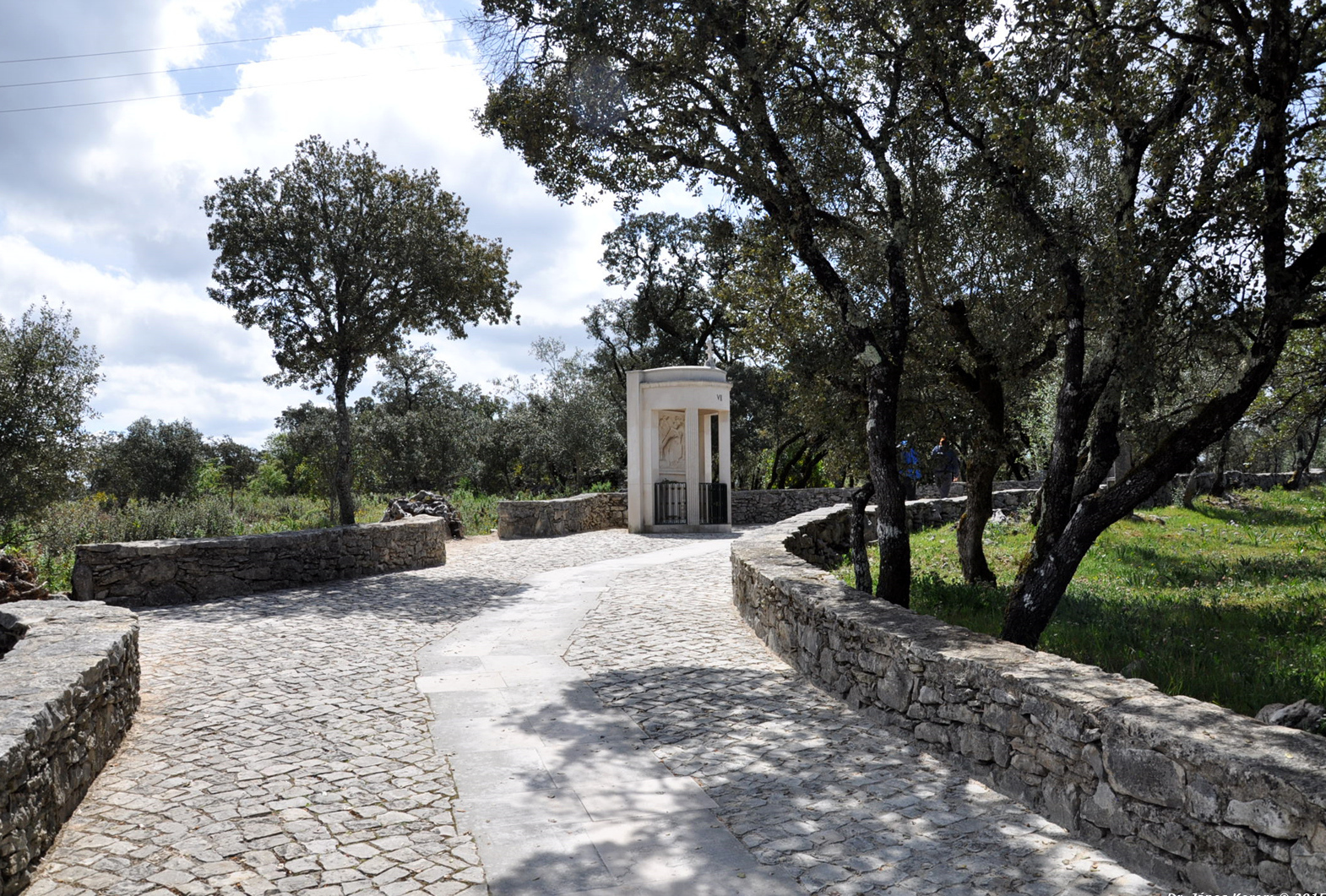
The Way of the Cross in Valinhos

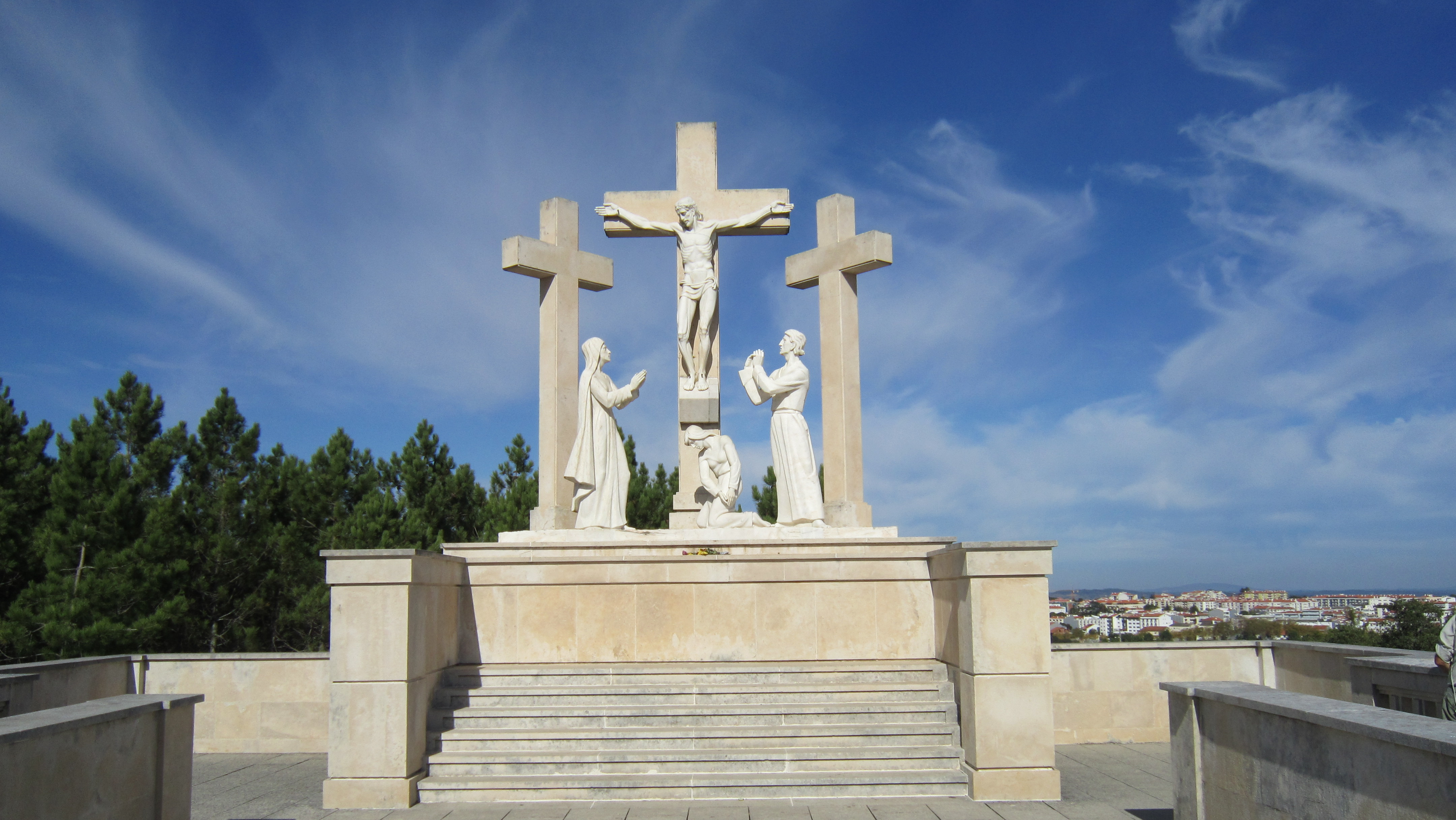
The Calvary in Fátima, Portugal

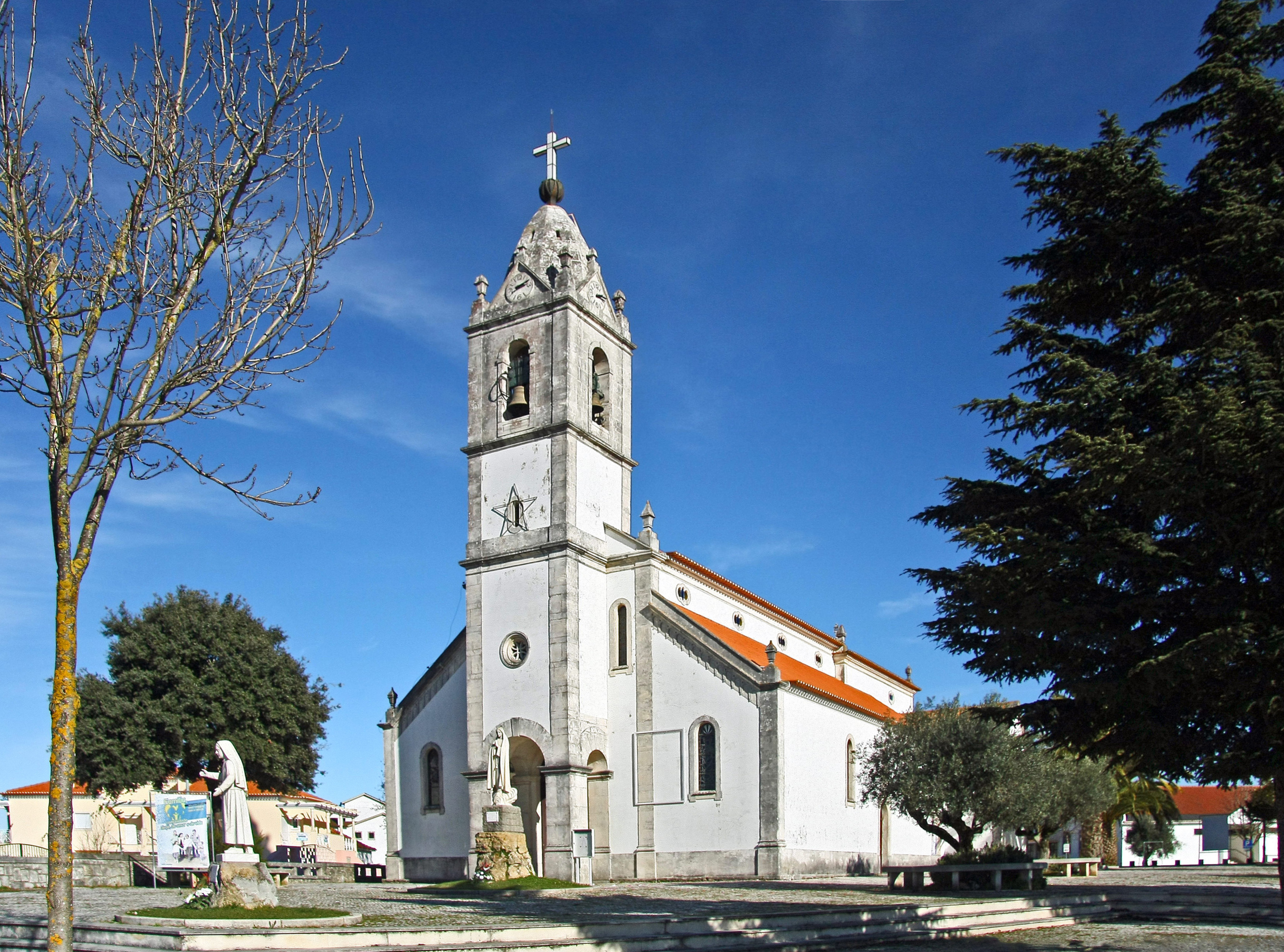
The Parish Church of Fátima

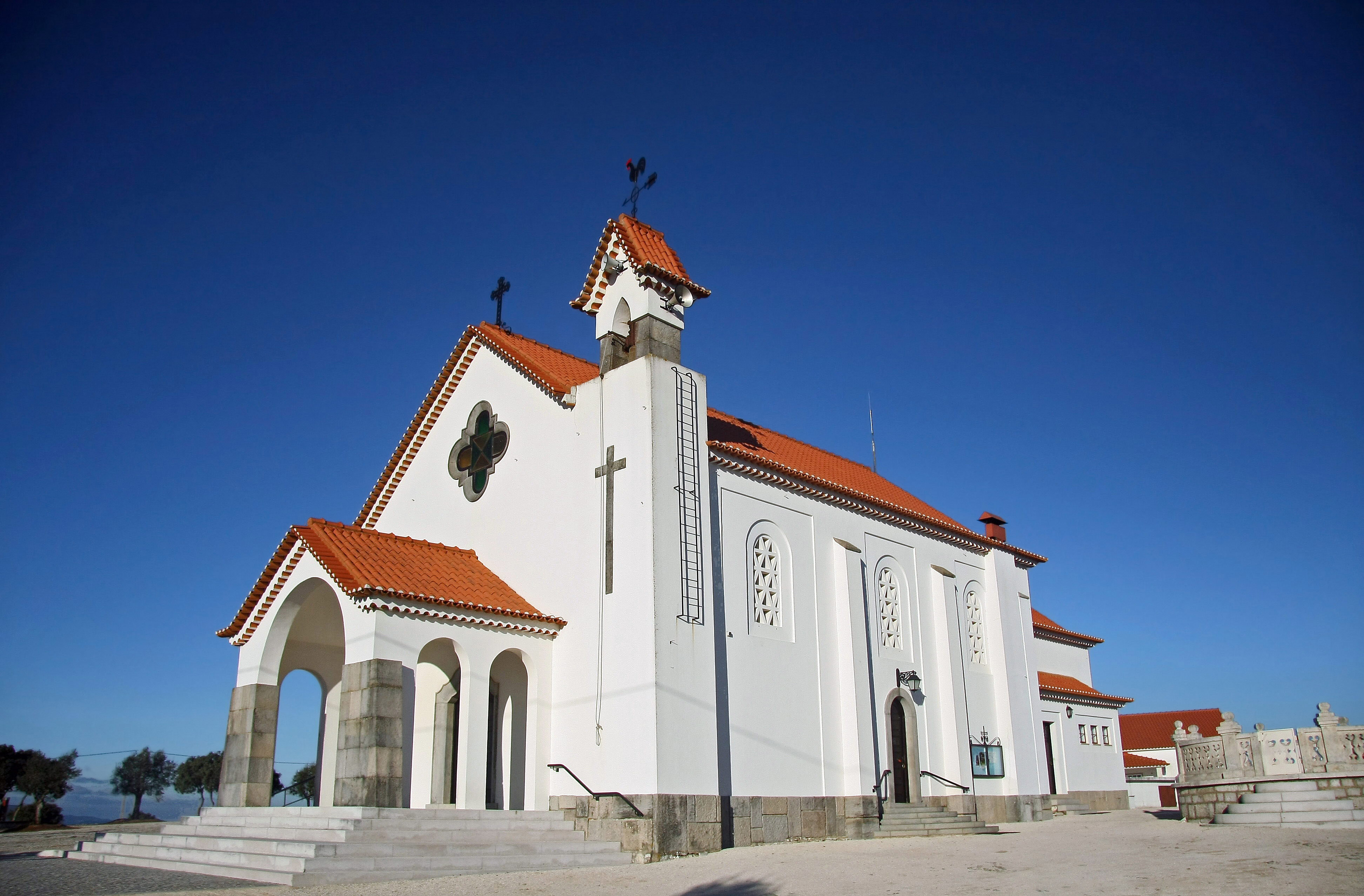
The Sanctuary of Our Lady of Ortiga

- Chapel of Casal Farto (Portuguese: Capela do Casal Farto)
- Chapel of Saint John the Baptist, Lombo de Égua (Portuguese: Capela de São João Baptista, Lombo de Égua)
- Chapel of Our Lady of Conception (Portuguese: Capela da Amoreira/Capela de Nossa Senhora da Conceição)
- Church of Our Lady of Livramento (Portuguese: Capela de Boleiros/Igreja de Nossa Senhora do Livramento)
- Church of Saint Anthony (Portuguese: Igreja Paroquial de Fátima / Igreja Paroquial de Santo António)
- Basilica of the Most Holy Trinity (Portuguese: Basílica da Santíssima Trindade), on the far side of the sanctuary's esplanade is the basilica, a neo-classical structure with a central tower 65 meters (213 ft) high, which was begun on 13 May 1928. It is flanked by colonnades linking it with the extensive convent and hospital buildings. Within the basilica are the tombs of the three witnesses to the apparitions: Jacinta and Francisco Marto and Lúcia dos Santos. The Church of the Holy Trinity, one of the largest churches in the world, was built on the other side of the esplanade in the early 21st century.
- Sanctuary of Our Lady of the Rosary of Fátima (Portuguese: Santuário de Nossa Senhora do Rosário de Fátima)
- Chapel of the Apparitions (Portuguese: Capelinha das Aparições)
- Basilica of Our Lady of the Rosary (Portuguese: Basílica de Nossa Senhora do Rosário)
- Sanctuary of Our Lady of Ortiga (Portuguese: Santuário de Nossa Senhora da Ortiga)
- Parish church of Fátima (Portuguese: Igreja Paroquial de Fátima)
- Stations of the Cross of Valinhos (Portuguese: Via Sacra dos Valinhos)
- Statues of the Angel of Portugal (Portuguese: Estátuas do Anjo de Portugal) at the Loca do Cabeço and at the Poço do Arneiro (well of Arneiro) in Aljustrel
- Chapel of Saint Stephen of Hungary (Portuguese: Capela de Santo Estevão)
- Byzantine Chapel of the Holy Dormition (Portuguese: Capela Bizantina da Sagrada Dormição), identified by its distinctive onion dome. Located at Domus Pacis, the headquarters of the Blue Army of Our Lady of Fátima. Used by the local Ukrainian Greek Catholic community.

== Culture ==
The Sanctuary of Our Lady of Fátima, in Cova da Iria, is the principal focus of all visitors. Annually, at least five million Catholic pilgrims fill the country roads leading to the Marian shrine. Numbers can reach hundreds of the thousands on 13 May and 13 October, the most significant dates of the apparitions in Fátima.

== Sports ==
Fátima's major sports club is the Sport Center of Fátima, currently in Portuguese football's second tier, the LigaPro.

== See also ==
- Our Lady of Fátima
- Parish Church of Fátima
- Sanctuary of Fátima
- Wax Museum of Fátima
- Life of Christ Museum
