= Aire and Candeeiros Ranges Natural Park =

Protected area in Portugal

- IUCN category V (protected landscape/seascape)
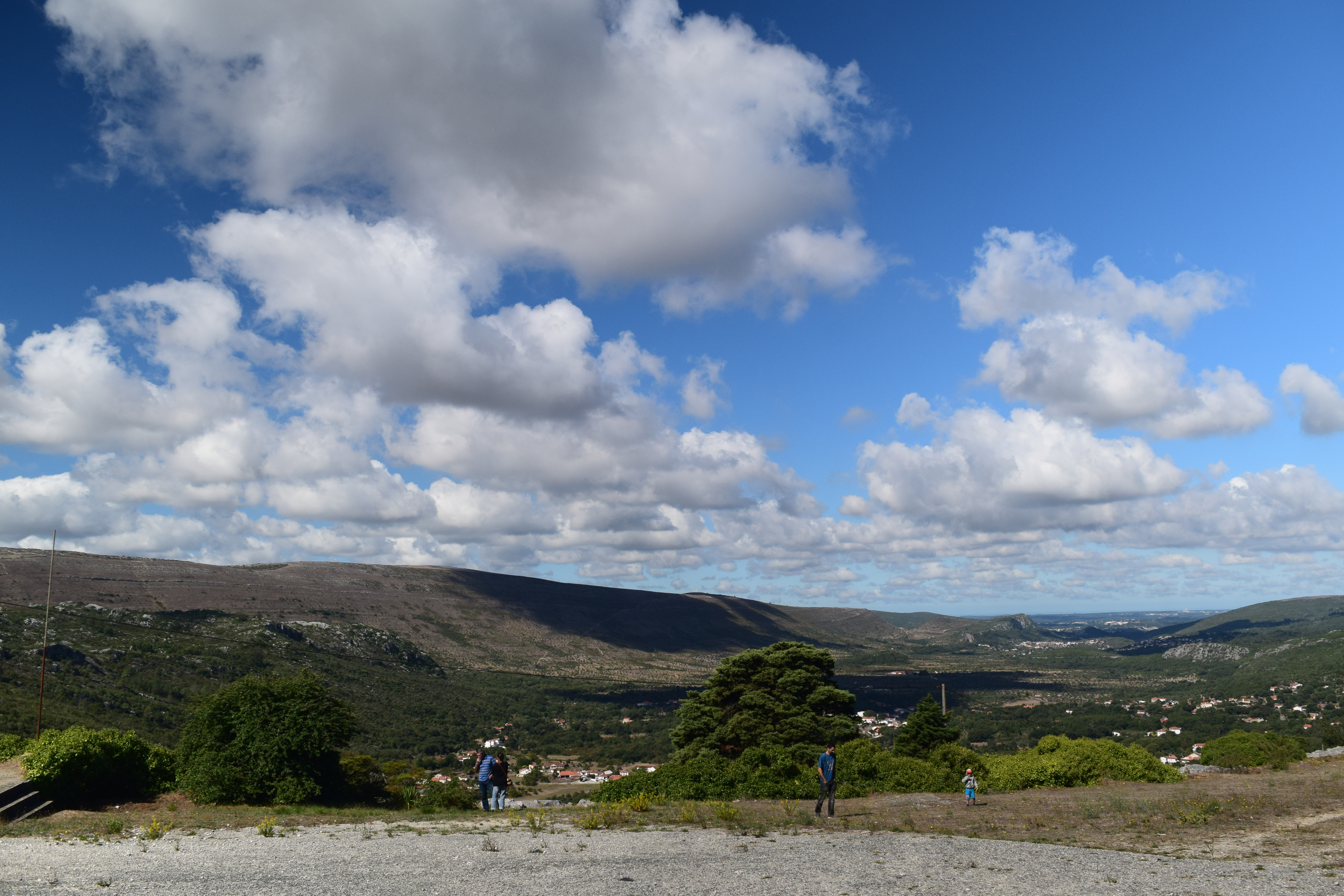
- The park in Alvados

- Location within Portugal
- Location: Estremadura and Ribatejo provinces
- Coordinates: 39°30′20″N 8°47′30″W
- Area: 383.93 km^{2} (148.24 sq mi)
- Created: 1979
- Visitors: 31,882 (in 2015-2020 (yearly average))
- Governing body: ICNF

The Aire and Candeeiros Ranges Natural Park (in Portuguese, Parque Natural das Serras de Aire e Candeeiros, or PNSAC) is a natural park in the Central-West region of Portugal. It occupies an area of 383.9 km^{2} (148.2 sq mi) and is the most important limestone deposit in Portugal, with a variety of geological formations and climate associated with karst geomorphology and topography, such as underground caves and sinkholes. It was designated a protected area in 1979 with the intent to preserve its natural aspects, and the architectonic and cultural heritage linked to the local human populations.

== Location ==
The park is located in the Central-West region of Portugal defining the border between the Estremadura and Ribatejo provinces, and the Leiria and Santarém districts. It comprises part of the municipalities of Alcanena, Alcobaça, Batalha, Leiria, Ourém, Porto de Mós, Rio Maior, Santarém and Torres Novas.

== Natural Heritage ==
=== Geology ===
With a mountainous landscape, PNSAC contains some of the most interesting geomorphological features within Portugal. It mostly includes mountain ranges, locally designated as "Serras", and plateaus.

==== Orogeny ====
The park is located within the Estremadura Limestone Massif, a geological unit deposited during the extensional rifting phases of the Lusitanian Basin during the Mesozoic era, and subsequently structurally deformed by the alpine compressive phases established from the end of the Cretaceous period onwards. The São Mamede Plateau and the Aire Range are the erosional remnants of a rollover anticline created and exposed by those tectonic processes.

==== Geomorphology ====
The Jurassic period rocks of the limestone massif flourish to a great extent, standing out by its relief as a prominent mass that rises about 200 m (660 ft) relative to its surroundings.

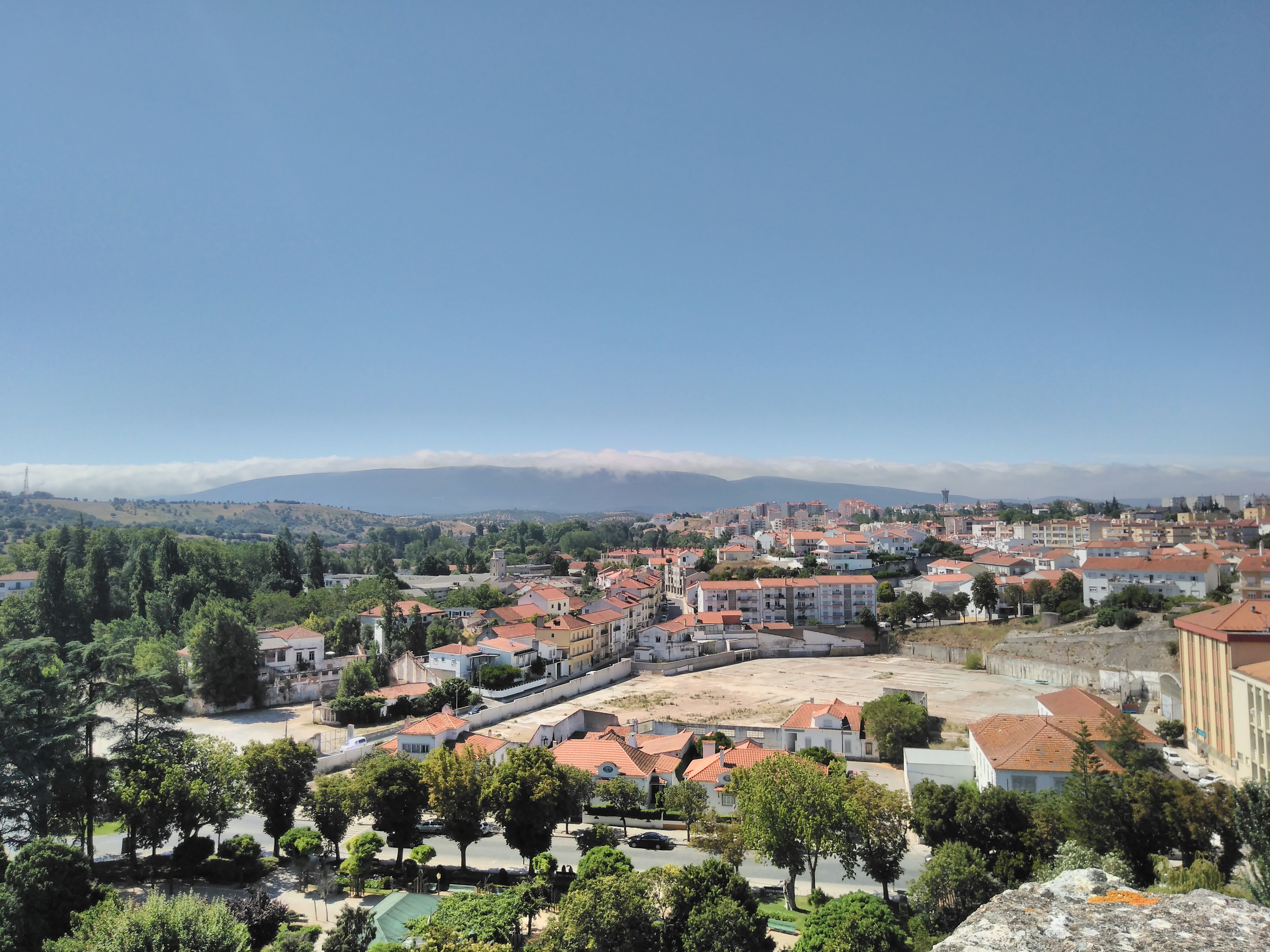
The East side of the Aire Range as seen from the castle of Torres Novas

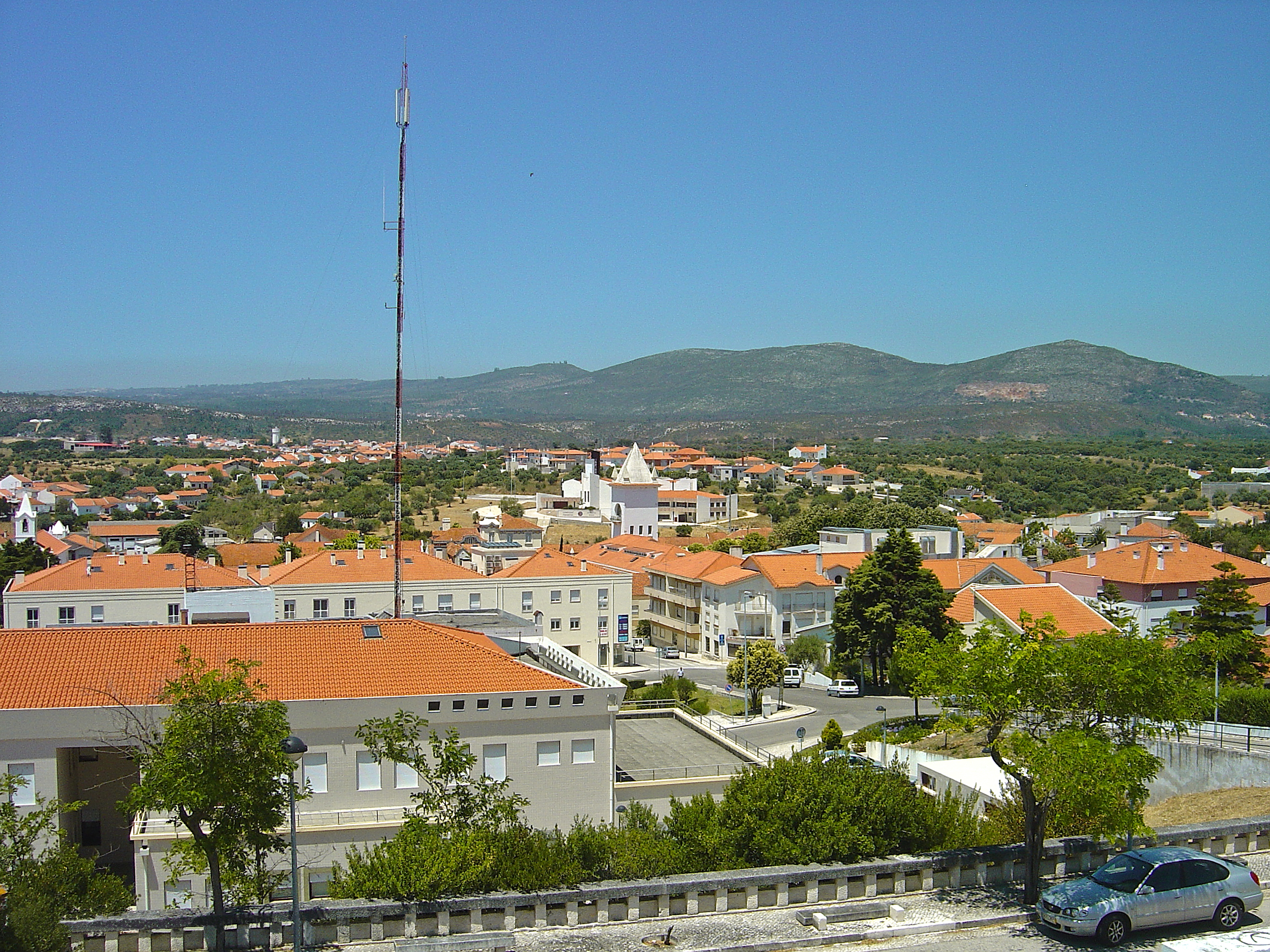
Southeast view of Santo António Range from Alcanena

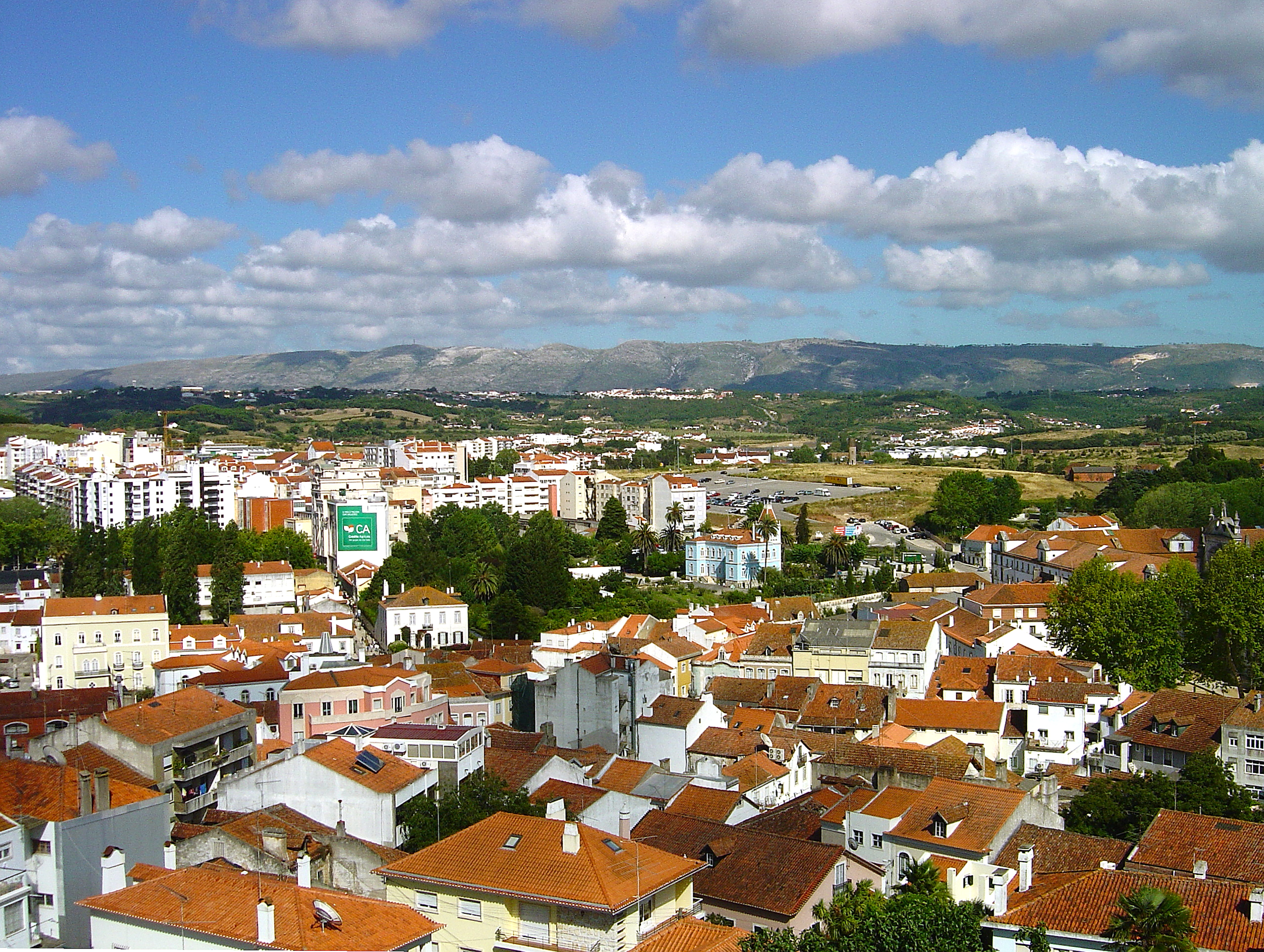
West side view of Candeeiros Range from Alcobaça

The main topographical features in the park are:

- Aire Range (679 m (2,228 ft)) in the northeast
- The adjacent Candeeiros Range (615 m (2,018 ft)) to the west, between Porto de Mós and Rio Maior
- Santo António Plateau in the centre
- Part of the São Mamede Plateau to the north.

The park's white and jointed limestone strata are constantly dissolved by the relatively abundant rainwater, which preferentially flows along and infiltrates through the joints, and further widens the natural fissures that so form in the process, on the surface and deep below the ground. In such ways, water, practically invisible on the surface, is the main erosive agent, forming karst features.
After infiltrating and flowing from higher ground, and on surface depressions where the rainwater outflow cannot match the inflow (such as poljes), water is naturally and ephemerally pooled, and sediment is deposited. After the wet season, these depressions eventually drain, leaving behind newly deposited fertile terra rossa.
These phenomena justify the absence of shallow watercourses, and the presence, instead, of a vast network of underground galleries, being perhaps one of the largest freshwater reservoirs in the country, giving rise to some important water courses, such as the Alviela and Lena river springs.

===== Karst Features =====
The park includes a great diversity of karst features, such as underground caves, pit caves, sinkholes, uvalas, poljes, limestone pavements, and ponors, among others. There are over 130 identified caves in the park. Some notable cave complexes include the Mira de Aire Caves, the Alvados Caves, the Almonda spring caves (including the Cave of Aroeira) and the Algar do Pena.

Other notable geological formations include:

- Minde-Mira de Aire Polje, a great karst depression and Ramsar wetland located between the towns of Minde and Mira de Aire, which floods with some frequency during the winter.
- Alviela karst spring and the Ribeira dos Amiais ponor
- Fórnea, a natural amphitheatre formed by temporary springs
- Arrimal Lagoons, sinkholes with naturally waterproofed bottoms with clays and other sediments
- The Salinas de Rio Maior, the only extant inland

salt pans in the Iberian Peninsula, centered on a brine well.

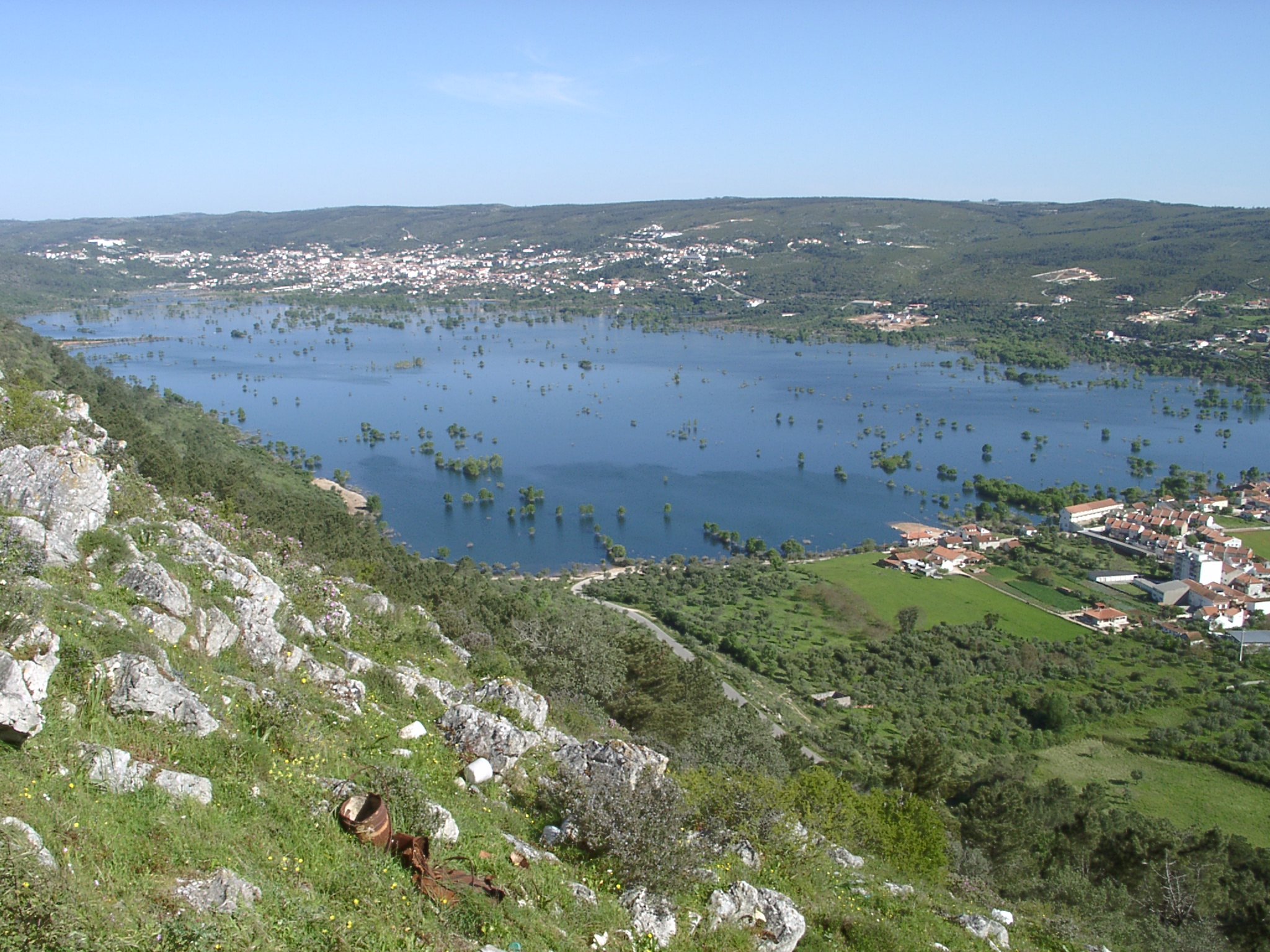
The Minde-Mira de Aire Polje floods in the winter months

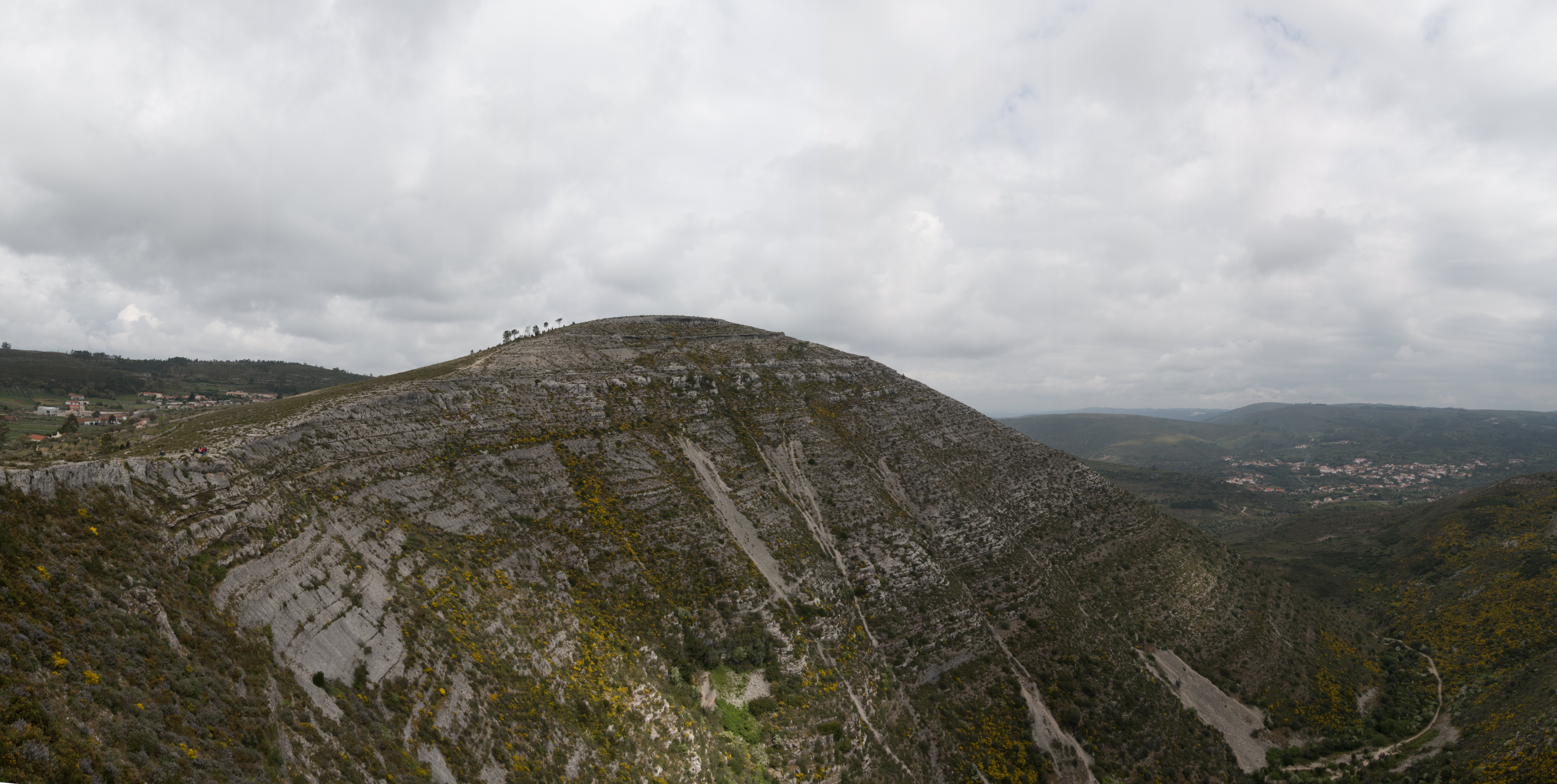
The characteristic morphology of Fórnea

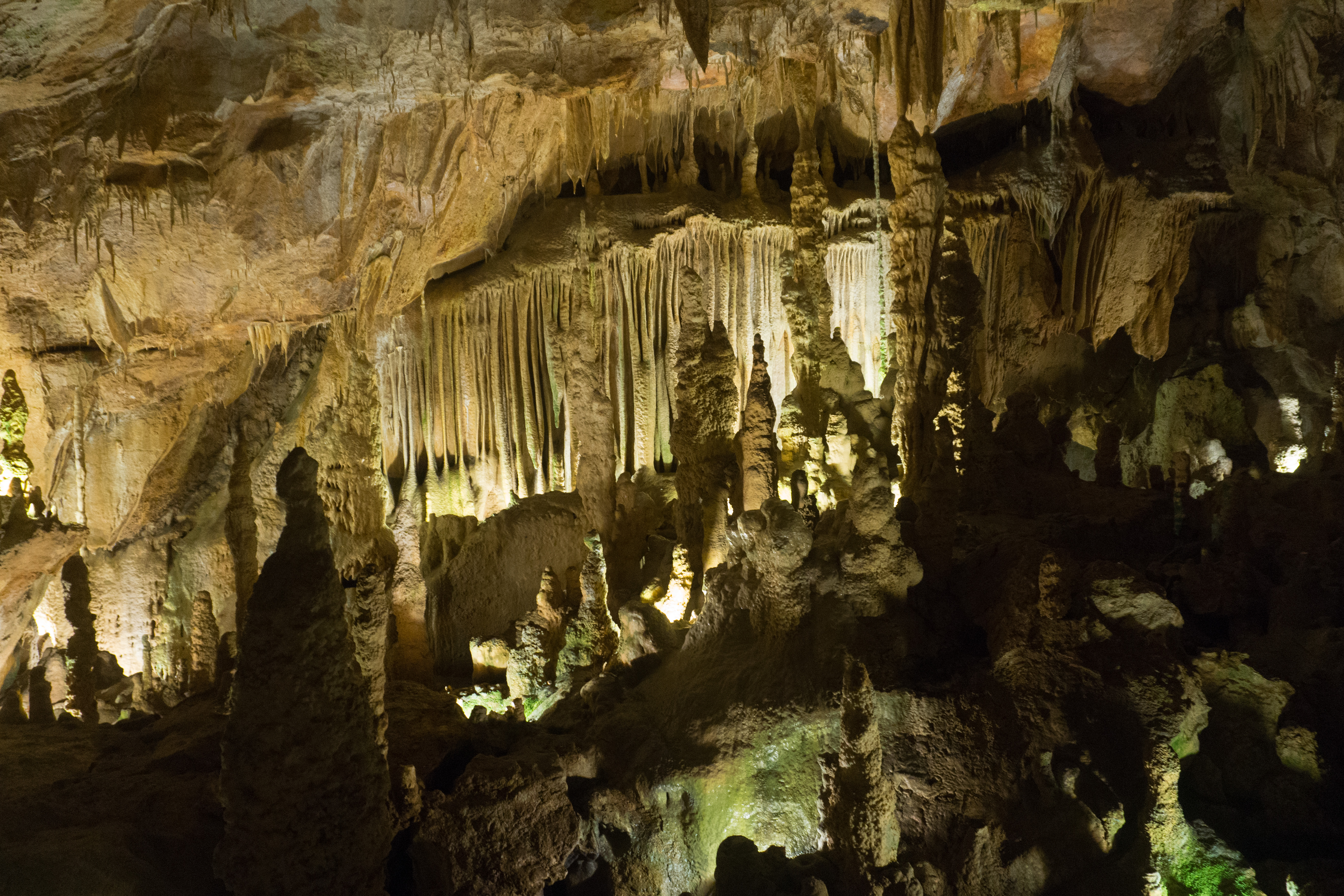
Santo António Caves

==== Paleontology ====
The park contains some small and scattered Middle Jurassic dinosaur tracks locations that dot the landscape, but two major dinosaur trackway sites are outstanding. Both sites are the oldest known dinosaur footprint locations in the Iberian Peninsula.:

- Aire Range Dinosaur Tracks Natural Monument, one of few sites in the world where Middle Jurassic sauropod dinosaur tracks can be found. It consists of many unusually well-preserved prints, including claw and digit impressions.
- Vale de Meios dinosaur tracksite, where over 1000 individual footprints forming numerous trackways are observable.

Also notable are the following paleontological locations:

- The Vale Florido biostromes consisting of fossilized coral and algae.
- The Barranco de Zambujal finds, including Ammonites, belemnites, brachiopods, bivalves and ichnofossils.
- The São Bento Jurassic Beach site, discovered in 2003, has a variety of fossilized echinoderms.

Skeletal remains of Pleistocene brown bears have also been discovered in Algar do Vale da Pena, near the village of Moita do Poço.

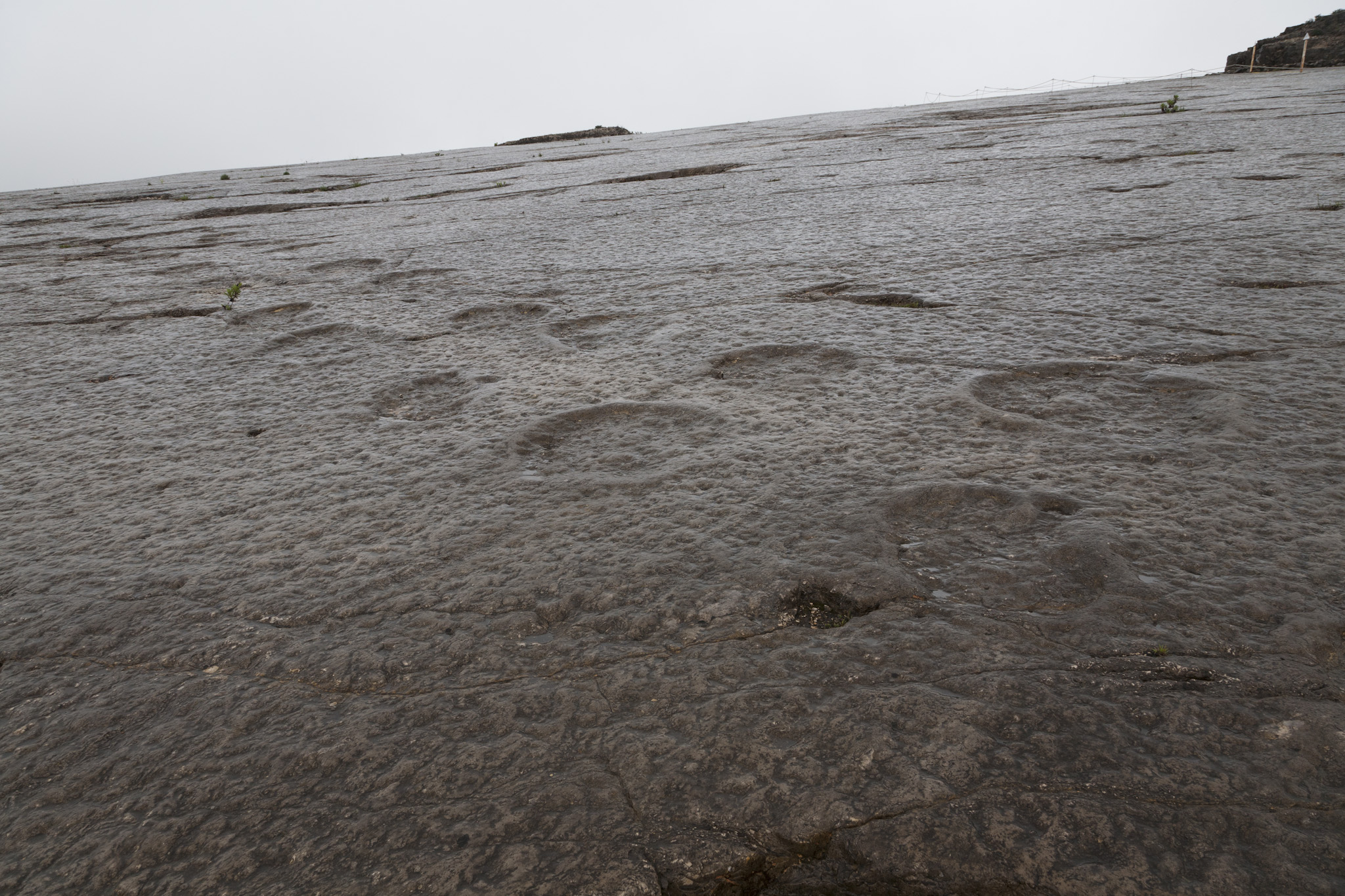
A major sauropod trackway at the Aire Range Dinosaur Footprint Natural Monument.

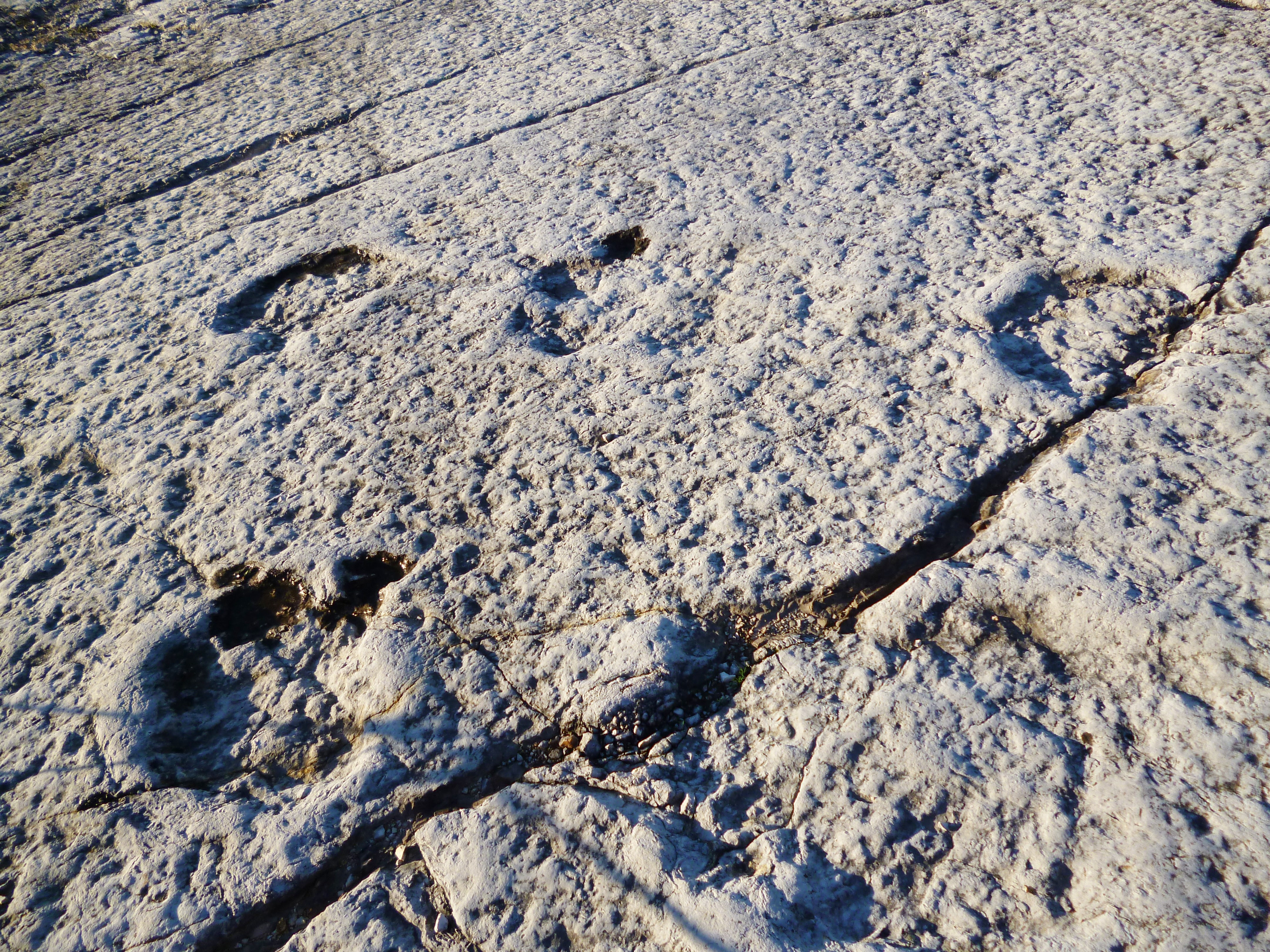
Sauropod footprints at the Aire Range site.

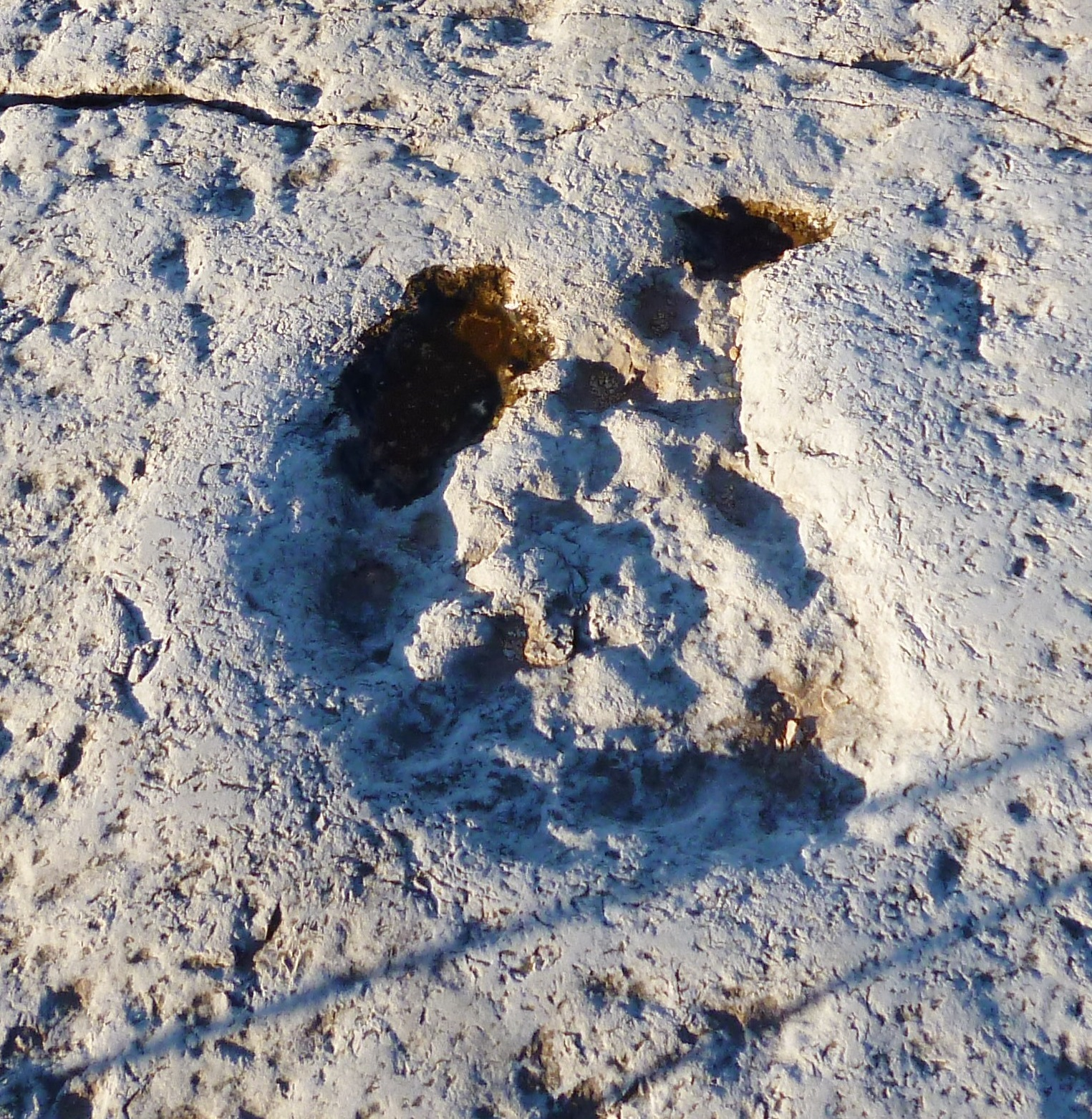
A sauropod manus print showing a claw and digit impressions details, at the Aire Range site.

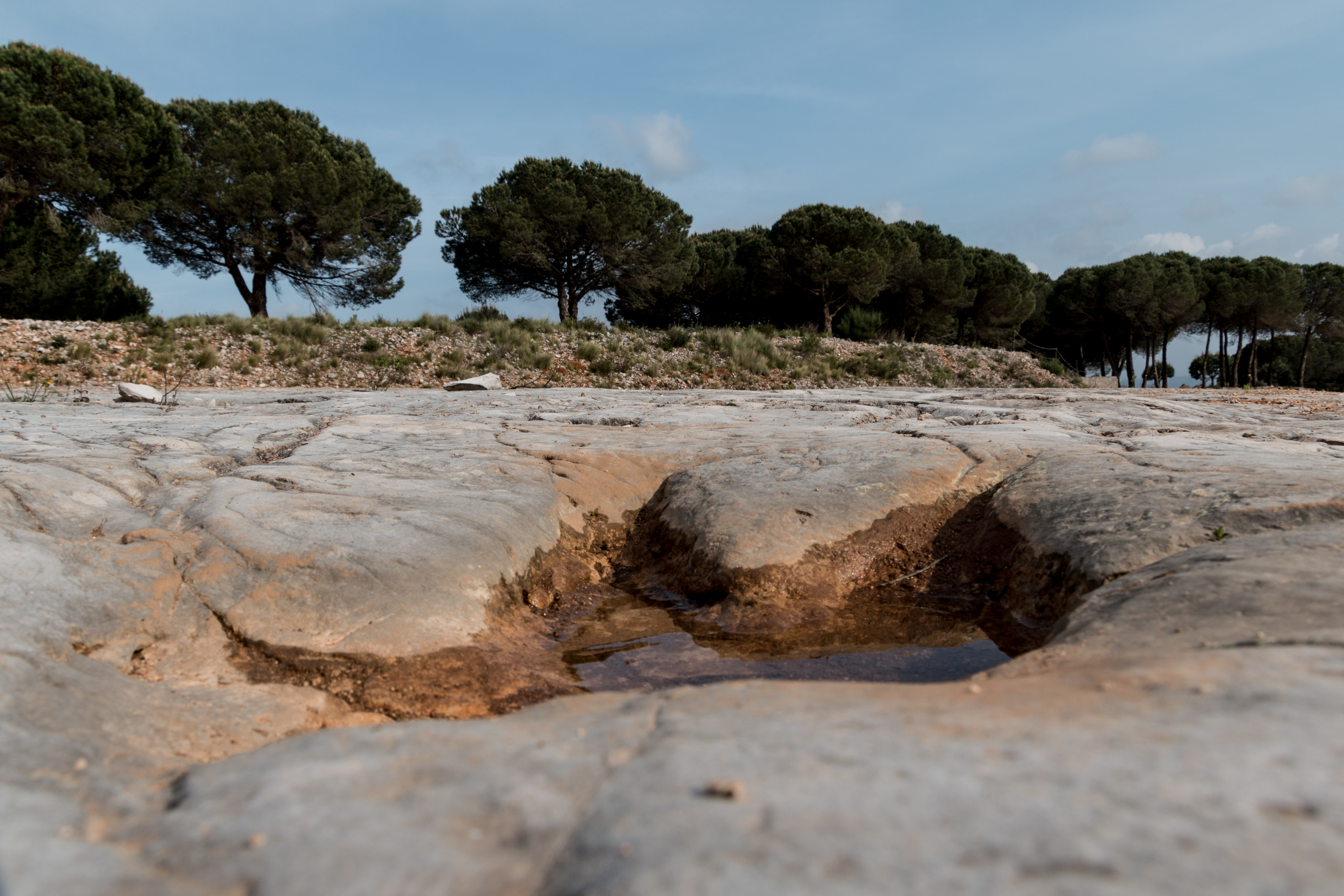
Theropod footprint in Vale de Meios

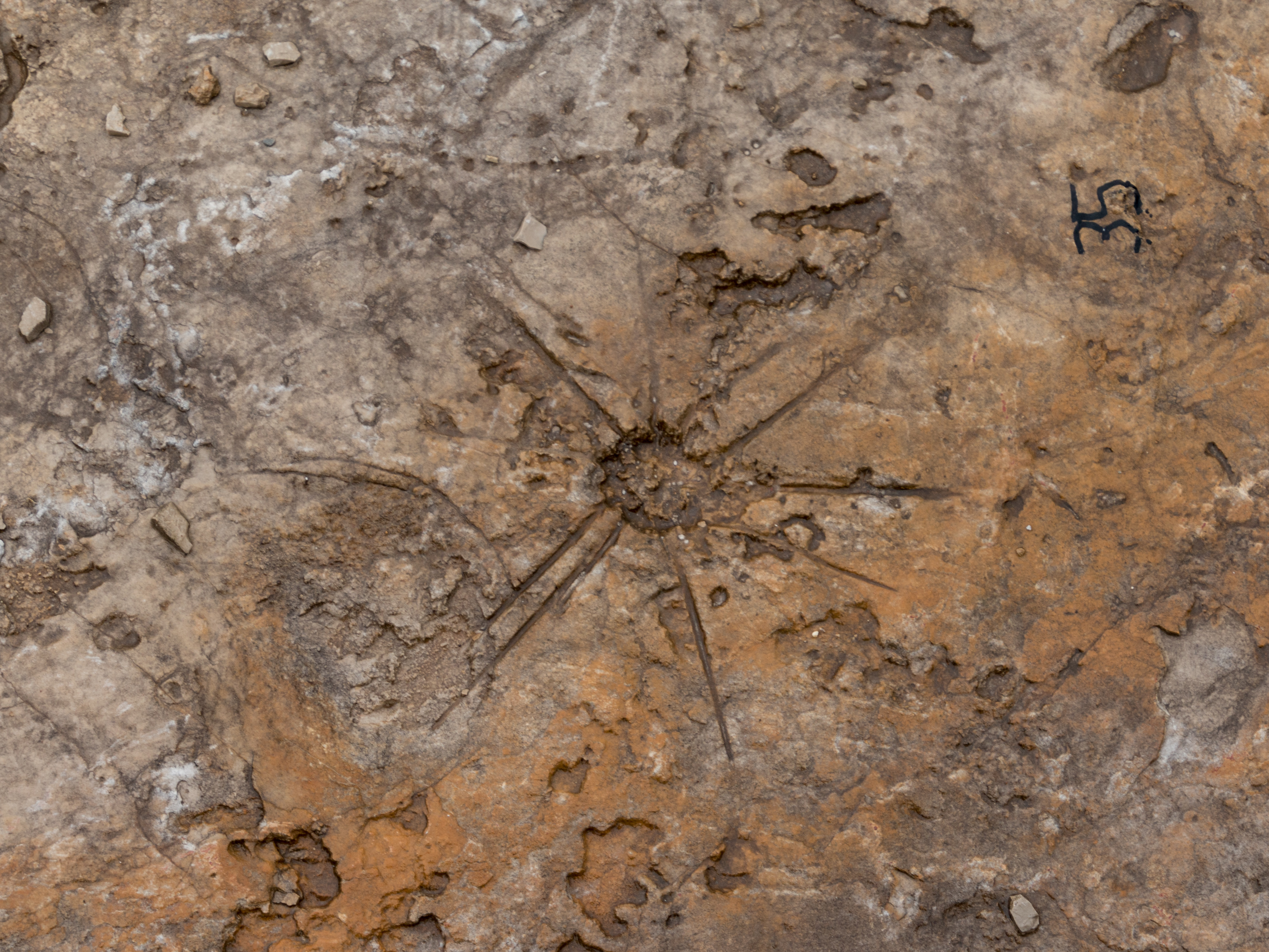
Sea urchin at the São Bento Jurassic Beach site

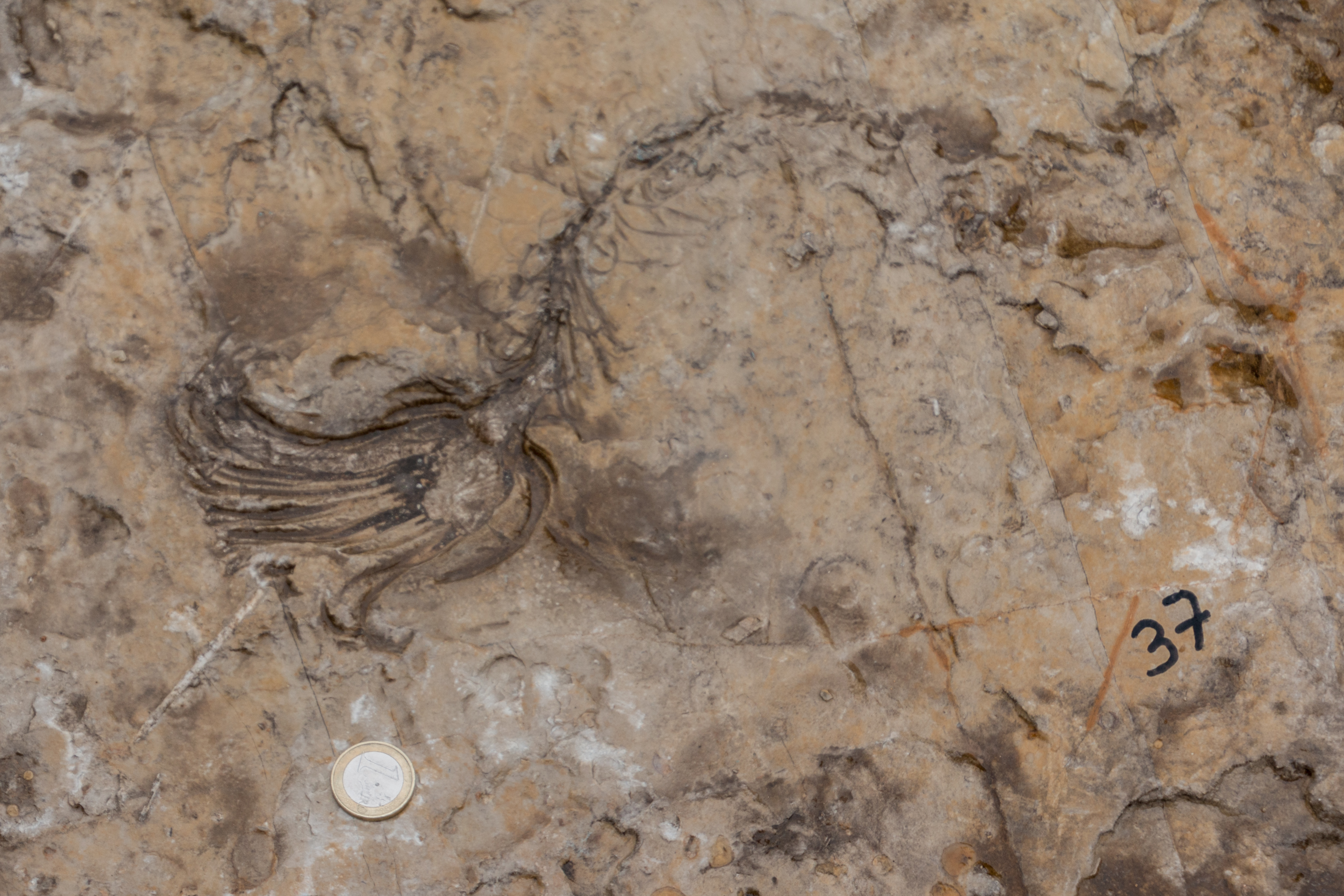
Crinoid at the São Bento Jurassic Beach site

=== Climate ===
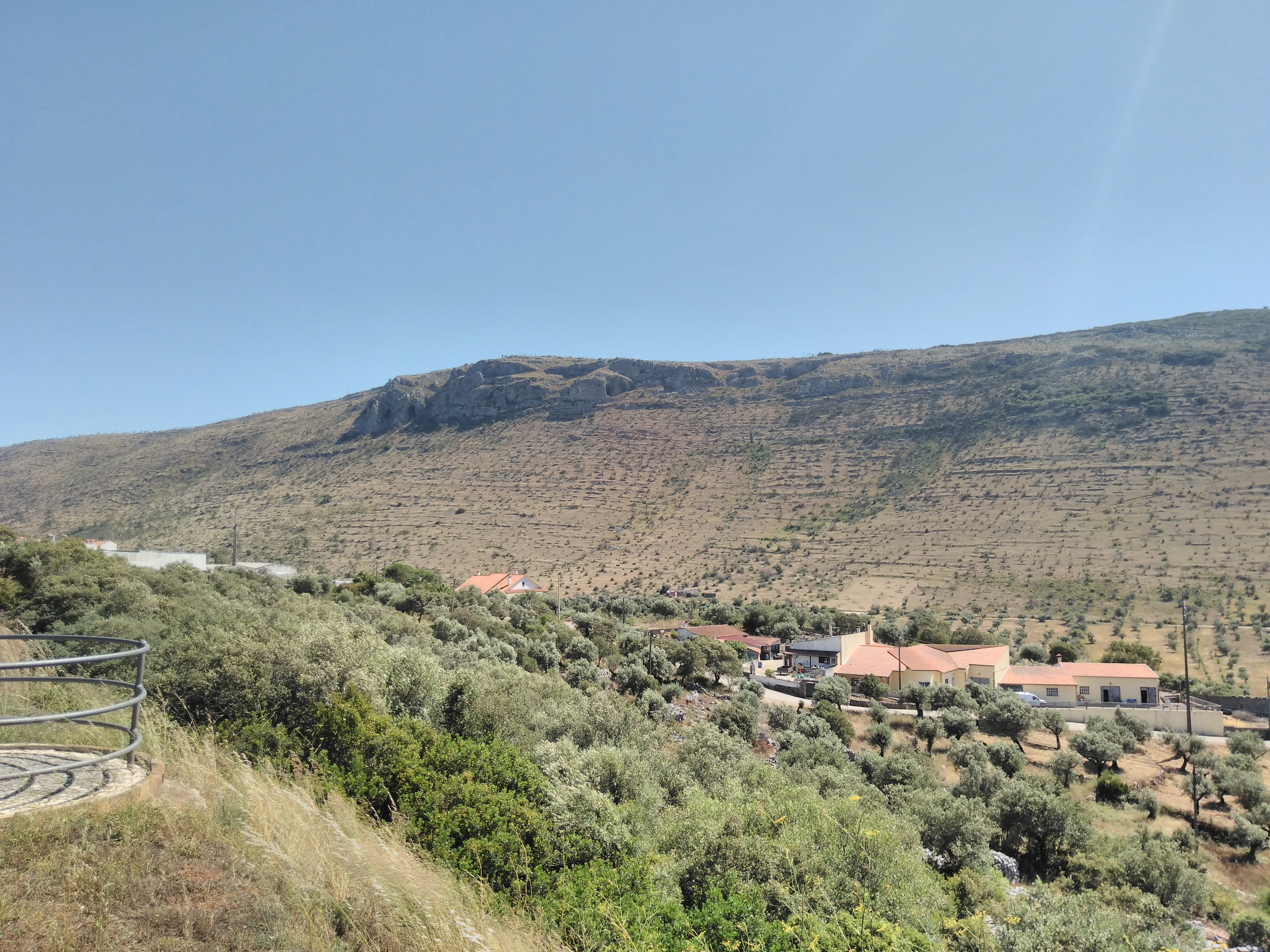
Despite the great annual precipitation, the park has a large water deficiency in the summer due to its climate and the porous nature of its soil, as seen in the margin of the Serra de Santo António plateau

The park has a Mediterranean climate, with mild, rainy winters and cool to hot, dry summers but variations in temperature, precipitation and insolation occur throughout the region. Areas closer to the Atlantic in the west have warm summers (with average summer highs around 24 °C (75 °F)) whilst areas that border the Ribatejo to the east tend to have hot summers (with average summer highs around 28–29 °C (82–84 °F). Altitude also plays a role. At altitudes above 400 m (1,300 ft), precipitation is plenty, with values above 1,200 mm (47 in) per year, but can go down to 800 mm (31 in) at lower altitudes. Average temperature ranges from 13.5 °C (56.3 °F) atop the Aire Range, to 16.0 °C (60.8 °F) at the lower plains.

The prevailing N-NW winds carry air masses loaded with moisture that cause intense fog and strong winter rainfall. As summer approaches, the Azores High moves further north. Clear skies become more frequent and rain is scarce between July and August. Fog is very common in winter, and in the summer, fog created by the marine layer can move from the Atlantic to the interior, but usually evaporates by midday. Average relative humidity is very high in the winter and values in the summer can have extreme variations, often below 40% during the day and above 80% at night. Temperatures at night are generally cool year-round but the high humidity along an absence of wind can make it more pleasant. Insolation varies between 2300 hours in the northwest mountains (south of Porto de Mós) and 2650 hours in the east. In general, Candeeiros Range receives a larger influence from the Atlantic, whereas the Aire Range has a more Mediterranean influenced climate.

Climate data for Serra de Santo António, altitude: 353 m (1,158 ft), 1984-2002
| Month | Jan | Feb | Mar | Apr | May | Jun | Jul | Aug | Sep | Oct | Nov | Dec | Year |
|---|---|---|---|---|---|---|---|---|---|---|---|---|---|
| Average precipitation mm (inches) | 199.9 (7.87) | 134.8 (5.31) | 84.3 (3.32) | 112.2 (4.42) | 94.0 (3.70) | 32.9 (1.30) | 8.3 (0.33) | 8.2 (0.32) | 57.3 (2.26) | 148.0 (5.83) | 164.3 (6.47) | 191.9 (7.56) | 1,236.1 (48.69) |
Source: Agência Portuguesa do Ambiente

=== Ecology ===
==== Flora ====
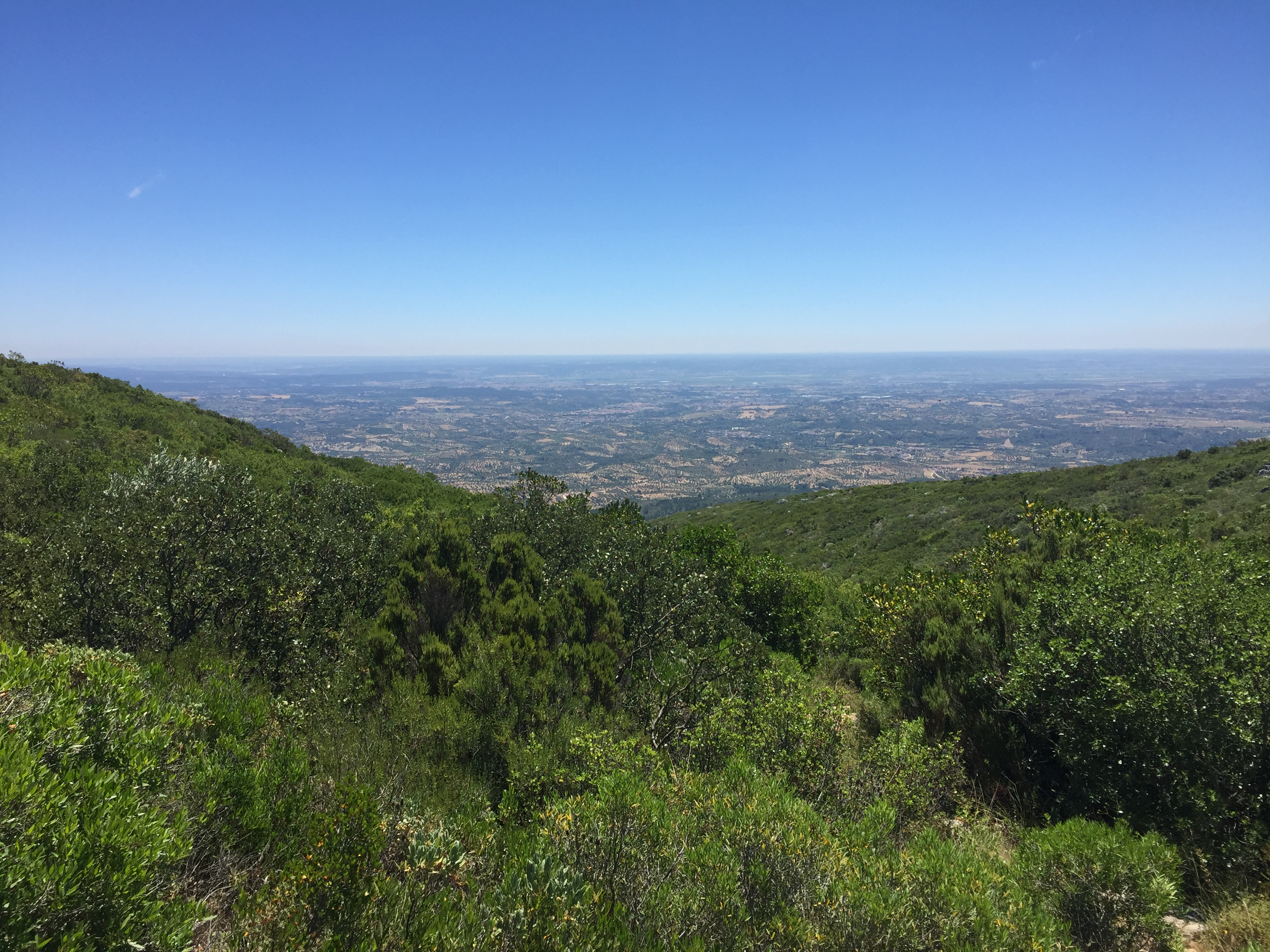
Typical Mediterranean vegetation of the park, overlooking the Ribatejo plains

The natural park is part of the Southwest Iberian Mediterranean sclerophyllous and mixed forests and hosts more than 600 different plant species. The vegetation that characterizes the PNSAC is the result of the bioclimatic influences on the territory. There is a great wealth of species with a diversity of sizes and origin (from Atlantic Europe, the Mediterranean, the Iberian Peninsula and North Africa), rare and unique Portuguese species, paleoclimatic species, some even used for medicinal, culinary, aromatic or ornamental purposes. Though floristically rich, the park has suffered dramatic changes over the years. The Alvados Depression is a clear example of this dynamism; at present its landscape is agrarian; however, centuries ago, at the time of its occupation by its first settlers, the area was a marsh that was surrounded by oak groves, pine groves and strawberry trees. Later, with the romanization, it became an olive grove with grafts of wild-olive.

The park has five main associated landscapes:

- The shrublands, with typical Mediterranean scrub which include Quercus coccifera, Erica arborea, Erica scoparia, Ulex, Cystus, Phillyrea latifolia, Phillyrea angustifolia, Rhamnus alaternus, Pistacia lentiscus, Olea oleaster, Lavandula stoechas, rosemary, oregano, bay laurel, Arbutus unedo, Daphne gnidium, Lonicera etrusca, Crataegus monogyna, Rubia peregrina, Smilax aspera, Rubus ulmifolius
- The humid oak and pine forests, featuring Q. rotundifolia, Q. faginea and Q. suber, Pinus pinaster, Pinus pinea, Hedera hibernica, Viburnum tinus, Ruscus aculeatus, Pteridium aquilinum, one of the most representative vegetative formations in the park. Q. pyrenaica is restricted to the centre of the park and Q. suber is uncommon due to its dislike for calcareous soils

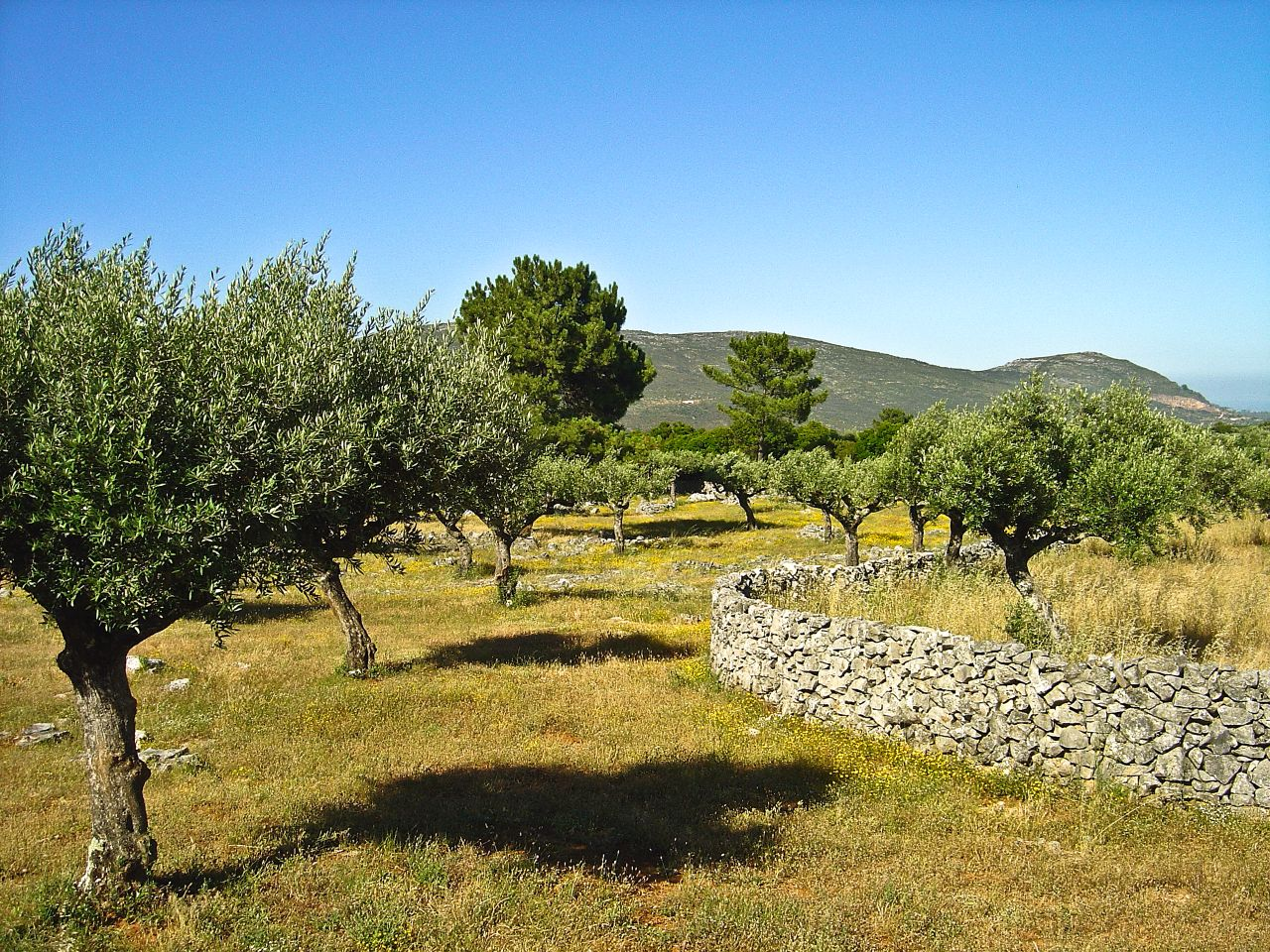
The typical olive groves and limestone walls

- The lithophyte plants, such as Sedum forsterianum, Petrosedum sediforme, Sedum album, Coronilla glauca, Thymus zygis, Arabis sadina, Rhamnus alaternus, Antirrhinum linkianum, Polypodium cambricum, Asplenium trichomanes, Asplenium ruta-muraria, Asplenium ceterach
- The human-introduced eucalyptus forests, olive groves and pastures, which are commonly associated with grasses such as Koeleria vallesiana, Dactylis glomerata, Melica minuta, Briza maxima, Hordeum murinum, Brachypodium phoenicoides, Bromus diandrus, Holcus lanatus, Lagurus ovatus, Helictochloa marginata, Euphorbia paniculata, Euphorbia characias, Convolvulus arvensis
- The riparian forests of Ulmus minor, Sambucus nigra, Salix atrocinerea, Salix alba, Alnus glutinosa, Tamarix gallica, Fraxinus angustifolia, very rare and degraded

Additionally, the park has 27 different species of orchid, about 50% of all the species native to Portugal and provides habitat for various calcerous flora that is uncommonly found in Portugal including: Iris subbiflora, Paeonia broteri, Paeonia officinalis, Jonopsidium abulense, Himantoglossum robertianum, Orobanche latisquama, Petrosedum sediforme, Scrophularia sambucifolia, Antirrhinum linkianum Teucrium chamaedrys, Salvia viridis, Inula montana, Aristolochia pistolochia, Teucrium fruticans, Ophrys fusca, Phlomis lychnitis, Fritillaria lusitanica and some Portuguese endemics such as Silene longicilia, Arabis sadina, Arrhenatherum pallens, Ulex jussiaei, Narcissus calcicola, Ulex airensis., Saxifraga cintrana and a newly described species in Portugal, Arenaria grandiflora, which is currently only known to exist in the park.

==== Fauna ====
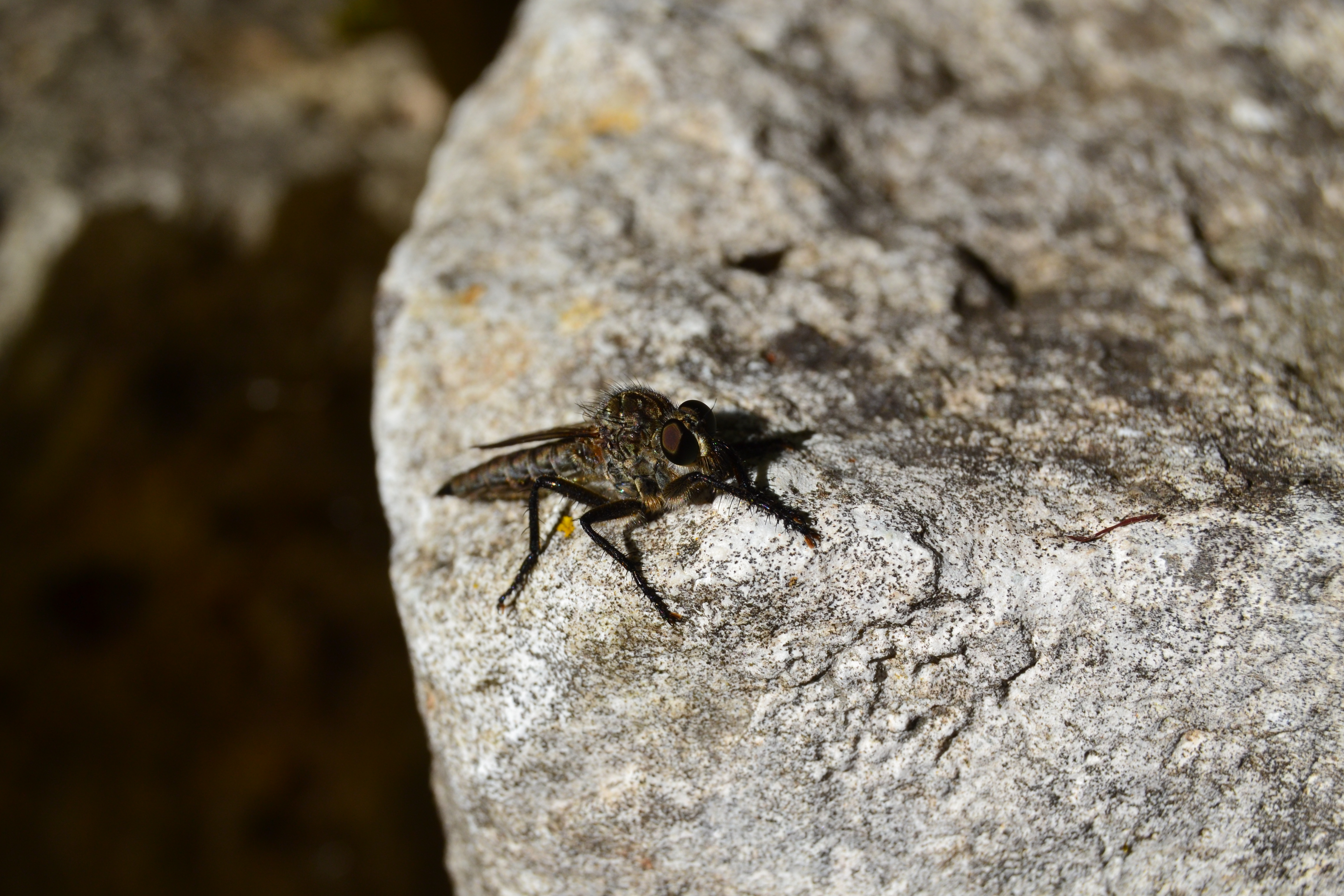
A local robber fly

The distribution and biodiversity of mammals is in part due to bioclimatic and geoecological characteristics. The fauna was drastically affected by the human occupation of this territory, which devastated habitats and destroyed resources. According to Alho (1997), a total of 204 species of vertebrates, of which 136 are birds, have been identified. Mammals located in the park can be divided according to size into micromammals, mesomammals and large mammals. Bats represent almost half of the mammal species in the park, with 21 known different species.

- The micromammals, present by the orders insectivores, chiropterans, and rodents include the European hedgehog, the greater white-toothed shrew, the Etruscan shrew, the Iberian shrew, and the Spanish mole, the house mouse, the Algerian mouse, the black rat, the wood mouse, the Lusitanian pine vole, the Mediterranean pine vole, the greater horseshoe bat, the Mehely's horseshoe bat, the lesser horseshoe bat, the Mediterranean horseshoe bat, the Geoffroy's bat, the Bechstein's bat, the greater mouse-eared bat, the Natterer's bat, the lesser mouse-eared bat, the common pipistrelle, the serotine bat, the common bent-wing bat, or the European free-tailed bat
- The mesomammals are present by species of the order lagomorpha, which include the European rabbit and the Granada hare
- the large mammals group the carnivore and ungulate orders and are represented by the European badger, the beech marten, the Eurasian otter, the least weasel, the European polecat, the red fox, the common genet, the Egyptian mongoose, the Iberian lynx, the European wildcat and the domestic donkey

Among the several migratory and resident bird species the most common are the short-toed snake eagle, the common buzzard, the common cuckoo, the Eurasian hoopoe, the great spotted woodpecker, the crested lark, the woodlark, the Eurasian skylark, the red-rumped swallow, the white wagtail, the Eurasian wren, the European robin, the black redstart, the European stonechat, the blue rock thrush, the Sardinian warbler, the Eurasian blackcap, the Iberian chiffchaff, the short-toed treecreeper, the Red-billed chough, the carrion crow, the spotless starling, the common linnet, the cirl bunting or the corn bunting.

Although lacking any water courses, the park has a surprising amount of amphibians, 13 species are known, which include the marbled newt, the Iberian ribbed newt, the western spadefoot, the common midwife toad, the Iberian painted frog, the Mediterranean tree frog, the Iberian frog, the Perez's frog, the common parsley frog, the common toad, among others.

Unlike water courses, underground galleries are vast and a number os endemic species inhabits these spaces, among them are Nesticus lusitanicus, Trechus machadoi, Trechus gamae, Trechus lunai in the Troglofauna, and Proasellus lusitanicus in the Stygofauna.

The park has around 17 species of reptiles, which include the spiny-footed lizard, the common wall gecko, the Carbonell's wall lizard, the Iberian wall lizard, the Spanish psammodromus, the Algerian psammodromus, the ocellated lizard, the Lataste's viper, the horseshoe whip snake, the viperine water snake, the southern smooth snake, the ladder snake or the Montpellier snake

Fish recorded in the park include the Iberian nase and Achondrostoma oligolepis.

== Cultural Heritage ==
The terrain is characteristically dry due to its porosity and so human settlements lie on and around the fertile terra rossa plains, where maize, potatoes, vines, other varied crops, and even gardens, are grown, allowing for a mosaic of colors and textures to form, with great seasonal dynamics.

=== Archaeology ===
Some notable archeological sites:

- The Aroeira Cave, nearby the park, has the earliest recorded human traces in Portugal, along with deer, equids, rhinoceros, bear, bovid, caprid, and tortoise remains.
- A Chalcolithic dolmen that was Christianized into a chapel still remains close to a church in Alcobertas.
- There are also Roman remains, notably a road in Alqueidão da Serra, Porto de Mós, which dates between the centuries I BC and I AD.
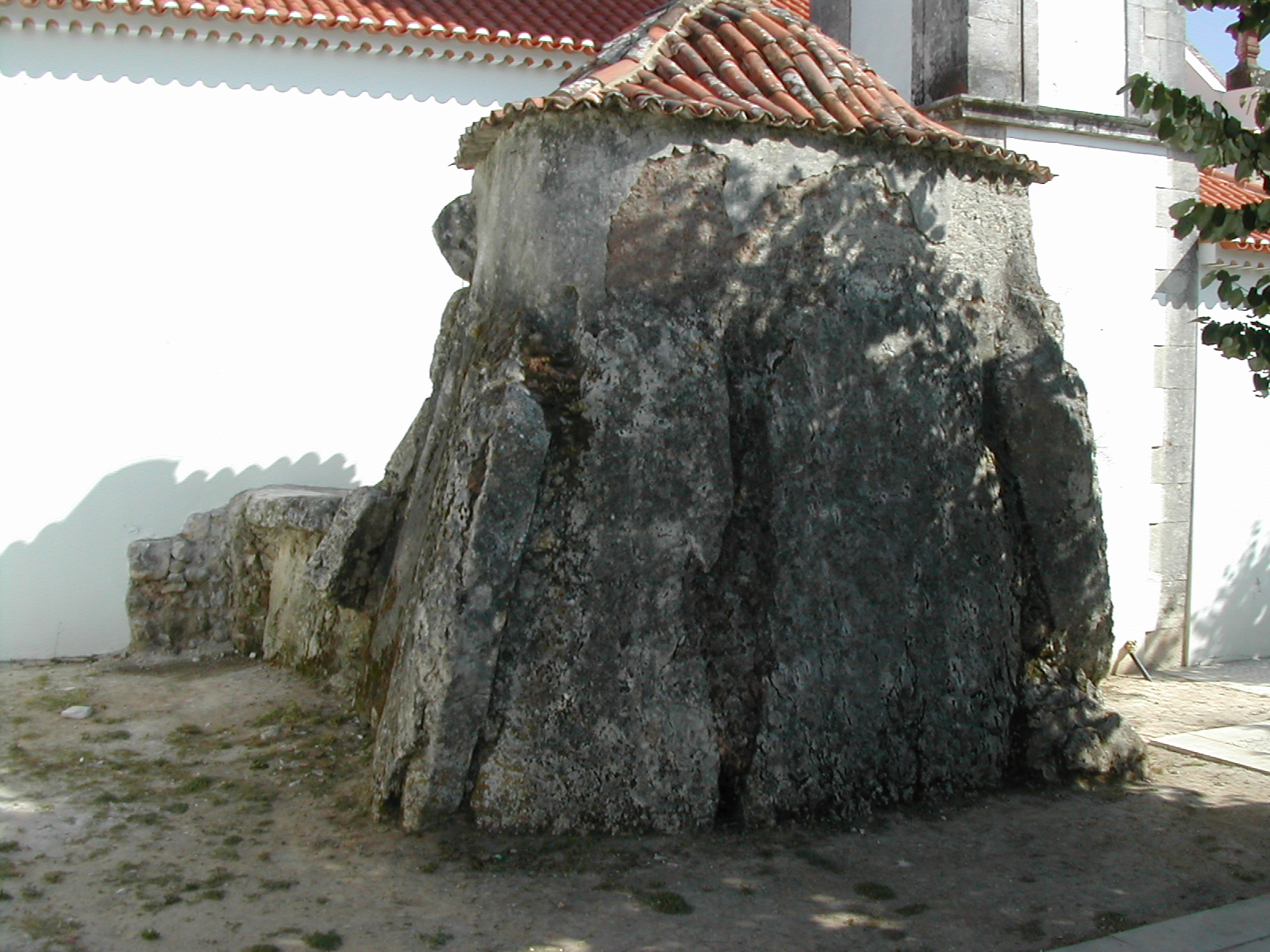
Christianized dolmen of Alcobertas

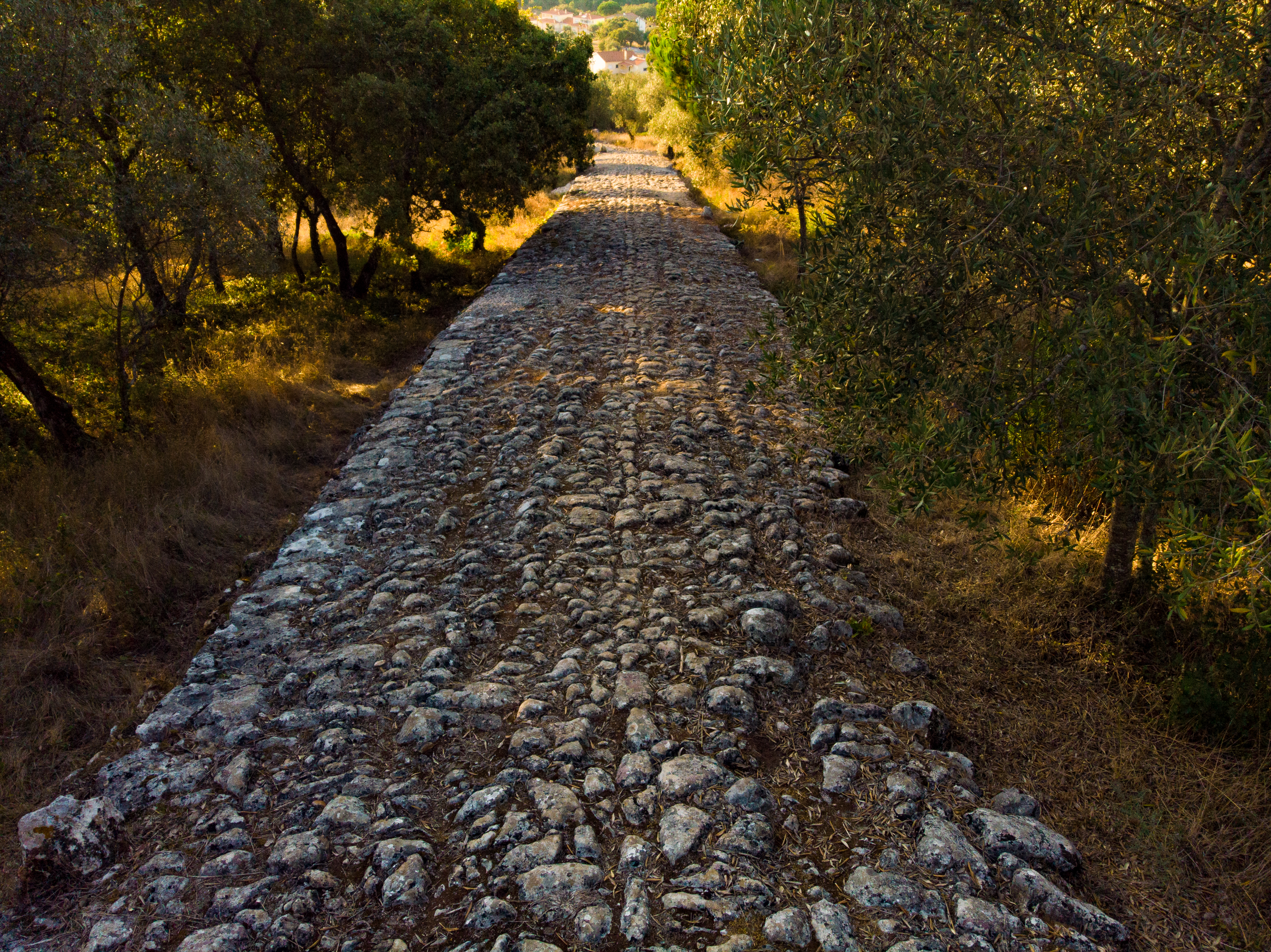
Roman road of Alqueidão da Serra

== Recent Human Activity ==
In more recent times, with the population less dependent on agricultural and pastoral activities, there has been a dispersion of buildings in the landscape, both for housing and for support of other economic activities. This diversification of the economy is partly responsible for the abandonment of the most traditional activities.

=== Ecological Threats ===
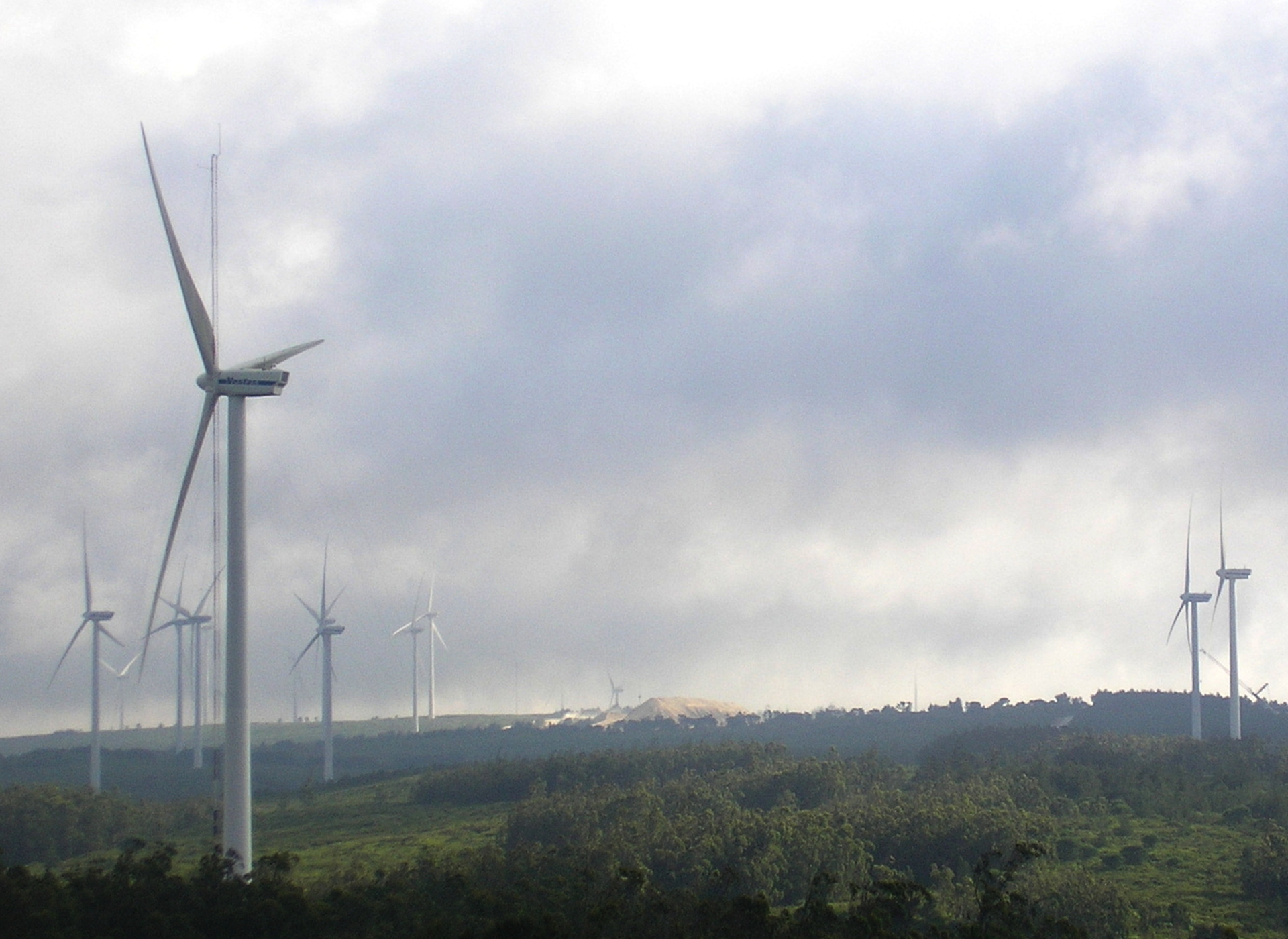
Wind turbines and quarries are the main threat to PNSAC's ecosystem

Even though a protected nature area was created to safeguard the existing natural aspects, several factors still continuously threaten the natural landscape and habitats:

- Open-pit mining: the exploit of the limestone beds through numerous open-pit quarries, and the associated trucking traffic, profoundly alters the topography and affects the neighboring habitat via noise pollution and dust and aerosol emission. They are also a nuisance and public health degradation factor for the local human populations.
- Urban sprawl: as previously described, the dispersal of urbanization also slowly but steadily deletes and visually pollutes the natural landscape. It also increases the noise pollution that affects the wildlife, introduces alien garden plants and pet animals that are often let loose about, such as cats and dogs, which intrude into and unbalance the trophic equilibriums in the local fauna.
- Road traffic: severe numbers of reptile and amphibian species are roadkilled by the automobile traffic.
- Wind turbines installations have increased in number over time, affecting the local fauna and flora. Every year, many birds and bats are killed by the blades of wind turbines.
- Agriculture: the historical reduction of the natural landscape through the conversion into crop areas, the introduction of alien and potentially invasive species, such as the Australian eucalyptus and acacias, as well as the usage of pesticides and the noise resulting from the mechanization of agriculture also affects the local fauna and flora.

Some measures taken to prevent these problems include the investment in nature tourism, scientific investigation and agriculture, particularly organic farming.
