= São Mamede (Batalha) =

- Civil parish
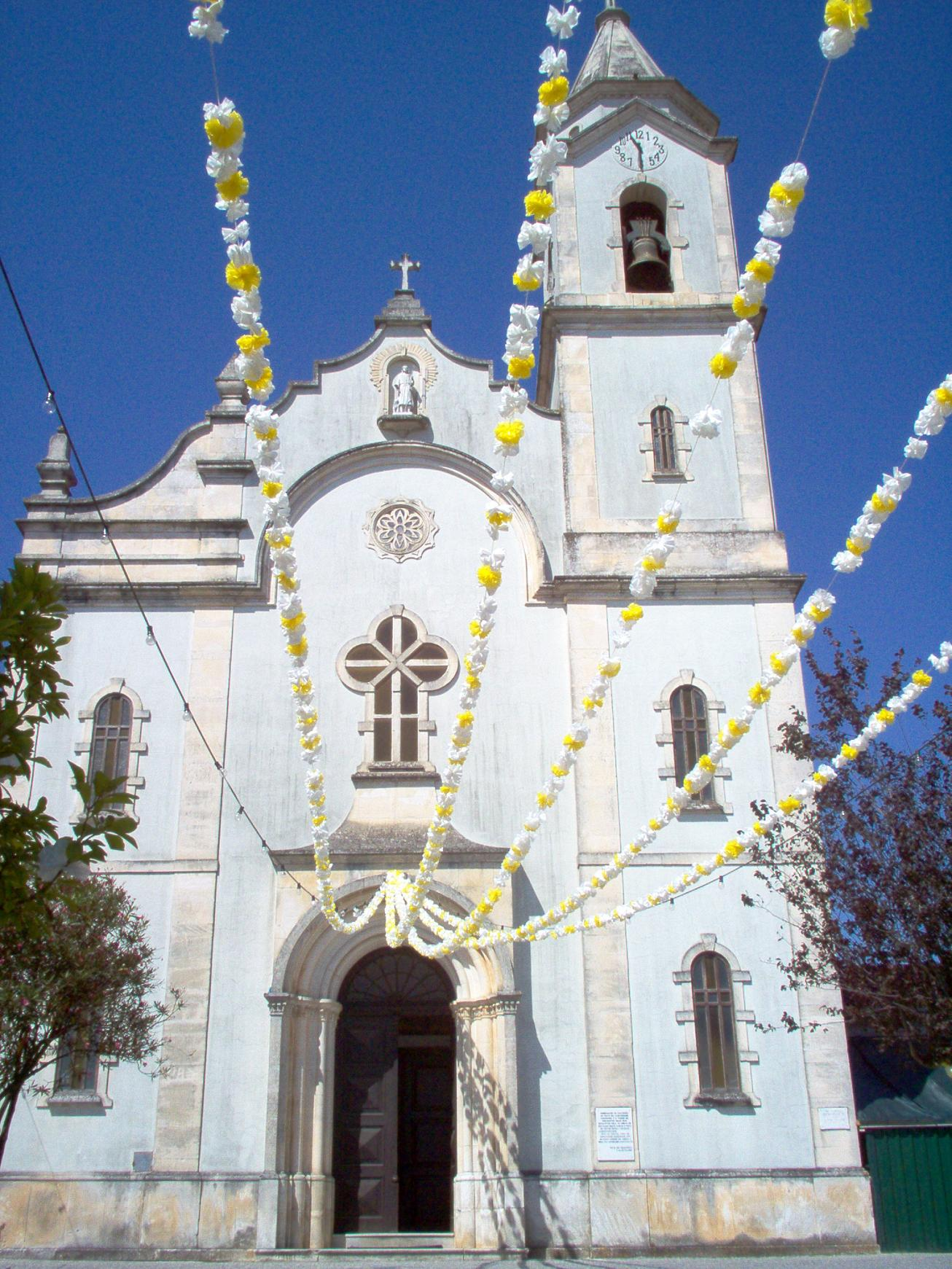
- The parish church

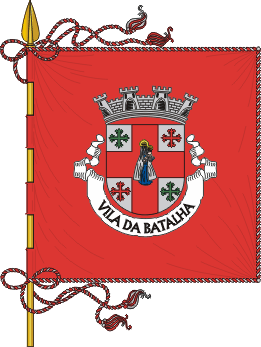
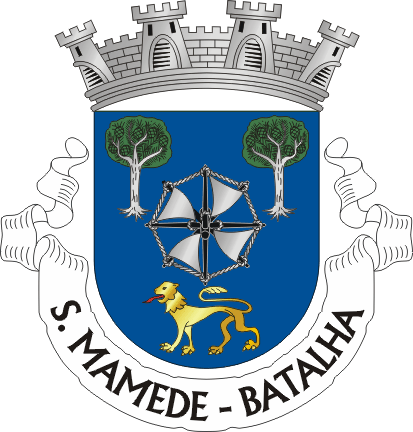
- Flag Coat of arms

- Location in Portugal
- Coordinates: 39°37′22″N 8°43′00″W
- Country: Portugal
- Region: Centro
- Intermunic. comm.: Região de Leiria
- District: Leiria
- Municipality: Batalha
- Established: 1916

Area
  - Total: 46 km^{2} (18 sq mi)
- Highest elevation: 520 m (1,710 ft)
- Lowest elevation: 320 m (1,050 ft)

Population (2011)
  - Total: 3,560
  - Density: 77/km^{2} (200/sq mi)
- Time zone: UTC+00:00 (WET)
  - Summer (DST): UTC+01:00 (WEST)
- Postal code: 2495
- Area code: 032
- Patron: Mammes of Caesarea

São Mamede is a civil parish in the municipality of Batalha, part of the Central Region and the Região de Leiria intermunicipal community of Portugal. It had a population of 3,560 in 2011 in an area of 46 km^{2} (18 sq mi).

== History ==
The civil parish was created on 15 June 1916 by dismemberment of the parish of Reguengo do Fetal by law of president Bernardino Machado.

== Geography ==
São Mamede is located 15 km east of the municipality seat, facing the municipalities of Leiria, Porto de Mós, Ourém and the parish of Reguengo do Fetal (Batalha), and has an approximate area of 46 km^{2} (18 sq mi).

== Geology ==
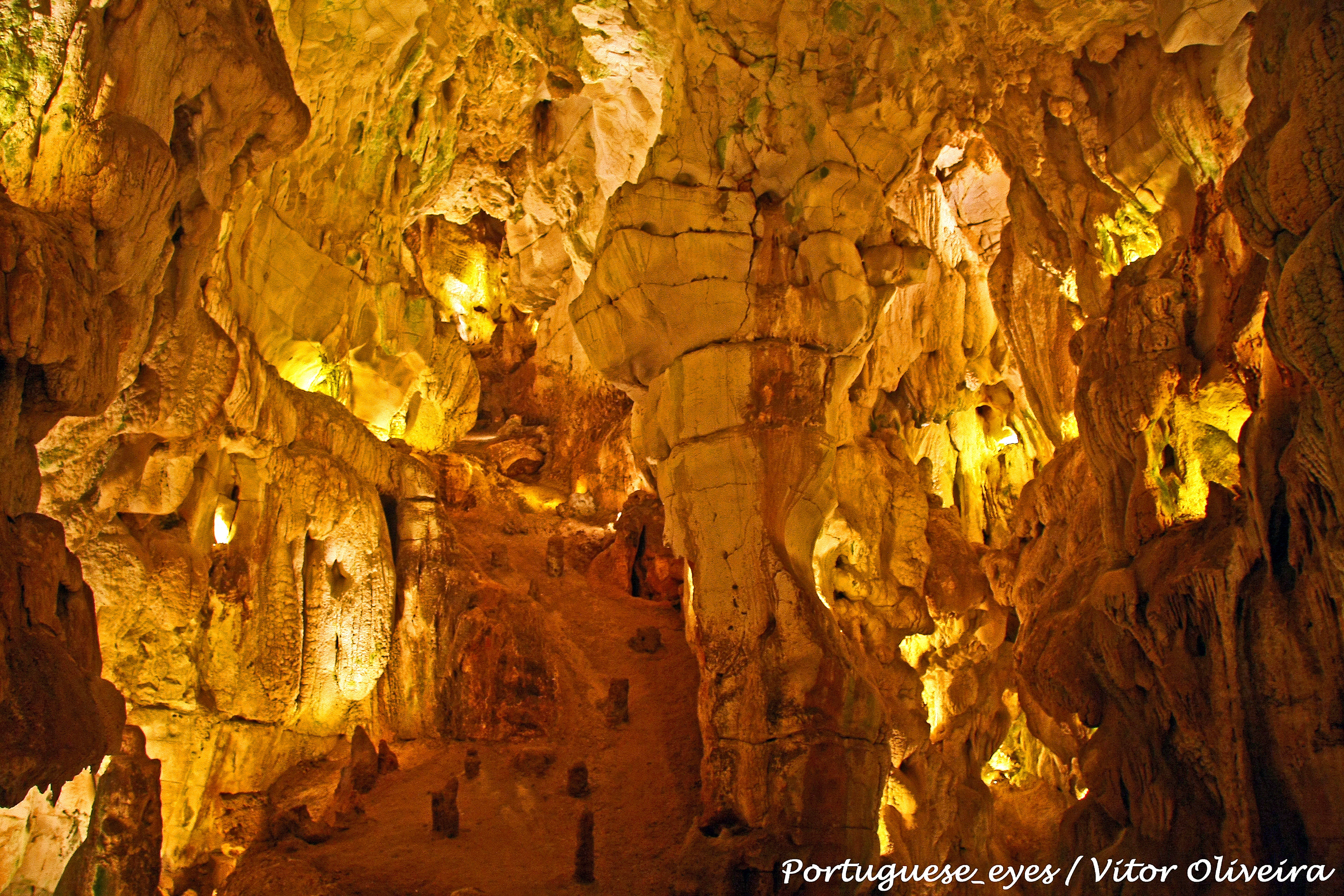
Gruta da Moeda

The parish is located on the São Mamede Plateau, a large compact limestone mass part of the Estremadura Limestone Massif and the Serras de Aire e Candeeiros Natural Park. This massif gives the parish a Karst topography, characterized by steep slope valleys, sinkholes, uvalas, pit caves and other multiple caves. The caves of São Mamede are not only strong tourist attractions, but also constitute a historical and patrimonial legacy of recognized worldwide value.

== Demographics ==
Population of the parish of São Mamede (1920–2011)
Year	Pop.	±%
1920	2,048	—
1930	2,450	+19.6%
1940	3,171	+29.4%
1950	3,742	+18.0%
1960	4,001	+6.9%
1970	3,253	−18.7%
1981	2,879	−11.5%
1991	3,117	+8.3%
2001	3,513	+12.7%
2011	3,560	+1.3%

In the 60s and early 70s a large flux of emigration drastically reduced the population. The current population is estimated to be around 3,513.

== Economy ==
Though a predominantly rural parish, São Mamede has seen a considerable development in the recent years. The current economic expression of São Mamede is based on the manufacturing and extractive industries and the civil construction sector, with agricultural activity carried out by a minority or carried out on a part-time basis. Religious and cultural tourism also plays an essential role in the local economy, benefiting São Mamede from a strategic location (axis: Batalha Monastery - Fátima Sanctuary), as well as other resources of great interest such as gastronomy, handicrafts and a whole range of other services such as diversified historical, architectural, artistic and cultural heritage, which constitutes a tourist potential duly noted in the various tourist routes in the region of Leiria and Fátima.

== Villages ==
- Barreira de Água
- Barreiro Grande
- Barreirinho Velho
- Casais de São Mamede
- Casal do Meio
- Casal dos Lobos
- Casal Suão
- Casal Velho
- Casal do Gil
- Casal Vieira
- Covão da Carvalha
- Covão do Espinheiro
- Crespos
- Demó
- Lagoa Ruiva
- Lapa Furada
- Milheirices
- Moita de Ervo
- Moita do Martinho
- Perulheira
- Pessegueiro
- Portela das Cruzes / Pia do Urso
- São Mamede
- Vale da Seta
- Vale de Barreiras
- Vale de Ourém
- Vale Sobreiro

== Places of interest ==
- Gruta da Moeda
- Pia do Urso
- Santo António Chappel (built in the 18th century)
