= Crenobacter cavernea =

Gram-negative bacterium

Crenobacter cavernea Cave-375 is a gram-negative bacterium that is closely related to a previously discovered Crenobacter cavernea strain K1W11S-77ͭ. C. cavernea Cave-375 has not directly been described morphologically, however the related strain K1W11S-77ͭ is a "rod-shaped, motile, and strictly aerobic novel bacteria".

Its metabolism has not yet been determined.

C. cavernea Cave-375 was first identified from a water sample coming from a dripping stalactite. This stalactite was located in the Algar do Pena cave in the karst Estremadura Limestone Massif in central western Portugal.

C. cavernea Cave-375 was first isolated and "grown on nutrient agar at 25 degrees Celsius".

Its ecology is not yet known. With the sequencing of the genome of C. cavernea Cave-375, the ecological impact should be able to be identified.

== Diversity ==
C. cavernea Cave-375 belongs in the Proteobacteria phylum, Neisseriaceae family, and Crenobacter cavernea species. By comparing the 16s rRNA of the CAVE-375 stain to Crenobacter cavernea species, a 99% similarity value was calculated. When comparing DNA-DNA hybridization using a Genome-to-Genome Distance Calculator, a 62.66% hybridization percentage was found.

== Genome ==
"Genomic DNA was extracted from C. cavernea Cave-375 using an NZY microbial gDNA isolation kit (NZYTech, Portugal)". The whole genome was then sequenced using whole genome shotgun sequencing method. With this, "17,325,372 high-quality raw sequences were assembled into 15 contigs with an N_{50} value of 323,281 and a total genome size of 2,273,143 base pairs (2.9 Mb)". NCBI Prokaryotic Genome Annotation Pipeline was able to identify a 65.9% GC content and sequencing coding for proteins and tRNA. "2,779 protein coding sequences and 63 tRNA sequences" were identified using this method.
