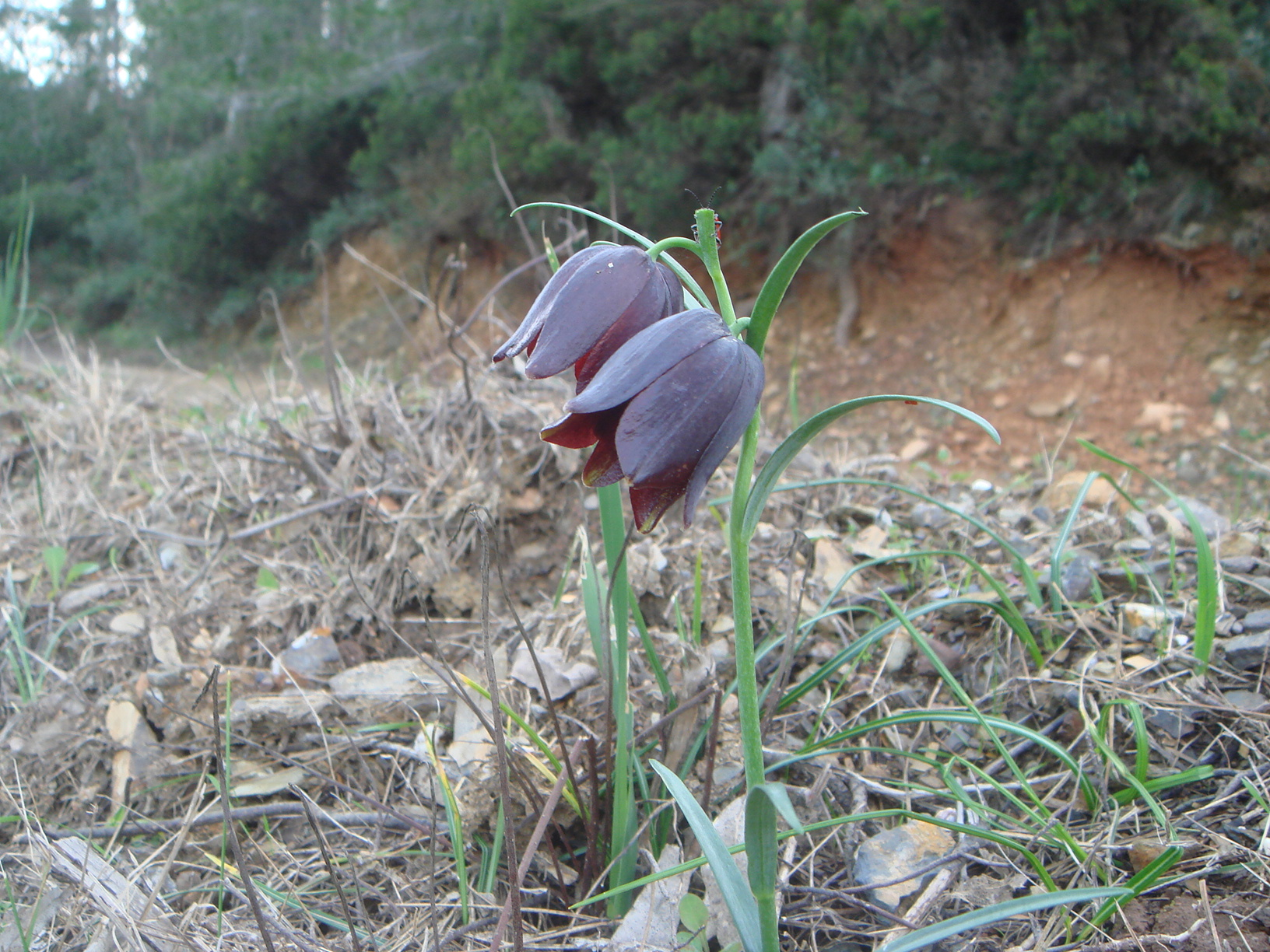

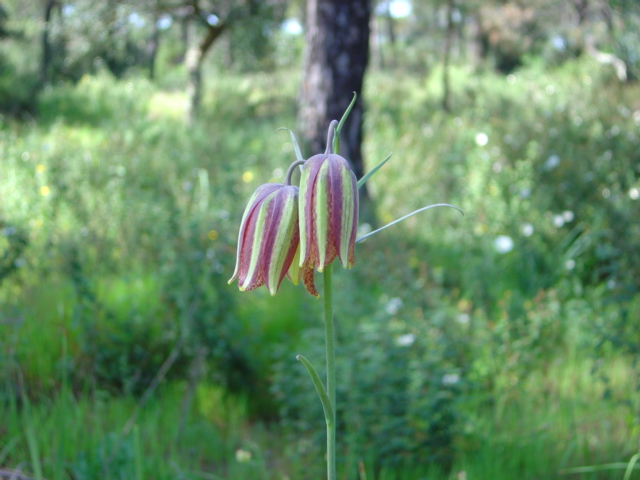

Conservation status
- Least Concern (IUCN 3.1)

Scientific classification
- Kingdom: Plantae
- Clade: Tracheophytes
- Clade: Angiosperms
- Clade: Monocots
- Order: Liliales
- Family: Liliaceae
- Subfamily: Lilioideae
- Tribe: Lilieae
- Genus: Fritillaria
- Species: F. lusitanica

Binomial name
- Fritillaria lusitanica Wikstr.

Synonyms
- Synonymy: Fritillaria messanensis Boiss. 1842, illegitimate homonym not Raf. 1814; Fritillaria hispanica Boiss. & Reut.; Fritillaria maria Sennen; Fritillaria stenophylla Boiss. & Reut. (syn of subsp. stenophylla)

= Fritillaria lusitanica =

Species of flowering plant

Fritillaria lusitanica is a species of plant in the lily family Liliaceae, endemic to the Iberian Peninsula.

It is a bulb-forming herbaceous perennial. The flowers are nodding (hanging), purple, sometimes with a green stripe along the central part of each tepal.

Its populations occurs scattered and usually with small numbers of individuals in central and southwestern areas of the Peninsula.

Subspecies

- Fritillaria lusitanica subsp. lusitanica
- Fritillaria lusitanica subsp. stenophylla (Boiss. & Reut.) K.Richt

formerly included

Several other names have been coined at the varietal and subspecific levels for taxa once thought to be parts of the species Fritillaria lusitanica but now considered better suited to other species.

- Fritillaria lusitanica var. algeriensis, now called Fritillaria oranensis
- Fritillaria lusitanica subsp. macrocarpa, now called Fritillaria macrocarpa
- Fritillaria lusitanica var. neglecta, now called Fritillaria messanensis subsp. neglecta
- Fritillaria lusitanica subsp. neglecta, now called Fritillaria messanensis subsp. neglecta
- Fritillaria lusitanica subsp. oranensis, now called Fritillaria oranensis

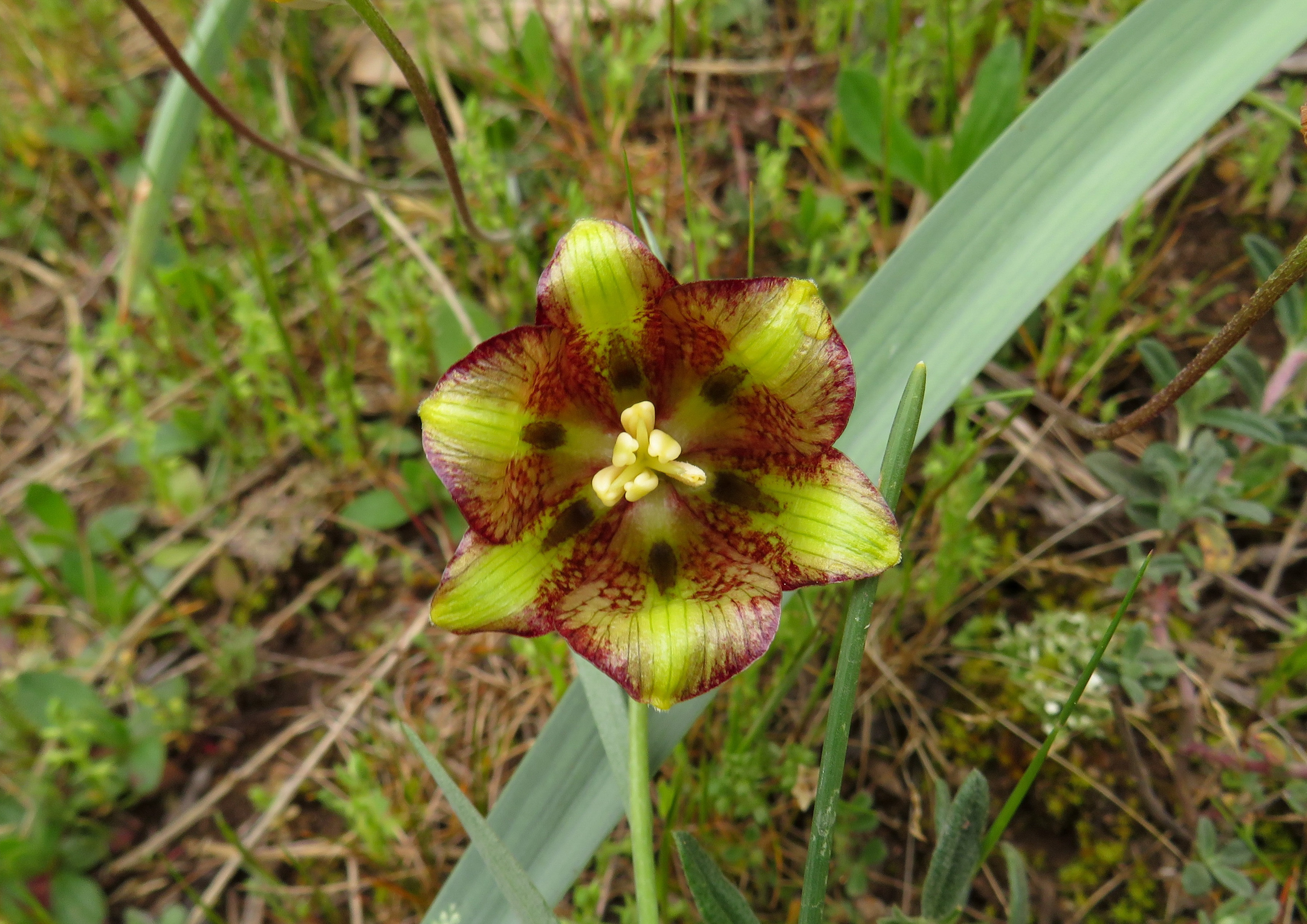
Flower.
