= Melica minuta =

Scientific classification
- Kingdom: Plantae
- Clade: Tracheophytes
- Clade: Angiosperms
- Clade: Monocots
- Clade: Commelinids
- Order: Poales
- Family: Poaceae
- Subfamily: Pooideae
- Genus: Melica
- Species: M. minuta

Binomial name
- Melica minuta L.

Species of grass

Melica minuta is a species of grass that can be found in the Mediterranean Basin, from Portugal and Morocco to the Eastern Mediterranean.

== Description ==
The species is perennial and have 20–50 centimetres (7.9–19.7 in) long culms. Both the leaf-sheaths and the leaf-blades have glabrous surface. The other features are different though; Leaf-sheaths are tubular and are closed on one end while leaf-blades are 1–2 millimetres (0.039–0.079 in) wide and are hairy as well. The eciliated margin have a ligule that is 3.5 millimetres (0.14 in) long. The panicle is linear, open, nodding, and is 3–12 centimetres (1.2–4.7 in) long with the main branches of the panicle are spread out. They carry 7–30 fertile spikelets.

Spikelets are oblong, solitary, are 7–9 millimetres (0.28–0.35 in) long and are pediceled. They also have 2 fertile florets which are diminished at the apex. The sterile florets are also present in a number of 2-3, and are barren, cuneate, and clumped. Both the upper and lower glumes are keelless, membranous, oblong and have acute apexes. Their size is different though; Lower glume is 5–7 millimetres (0.20–0.28 in) long, while the upper one is 6.5–8 millimetres (0.26–0.31 in) long.

Its lemma have scaberulous surface with the fertile lemma being chartaceous, keelless, oblong, ovate and of the same size as the upper glume. Lemma have an acute apex, with palea being 2-veined. Flowers are fleshy, oblong and truncate. They also grow together, have 2 lodicules and 3 anthers. The fruits have caryopsis, are 2.5–3 millimetres (0.098–0.118 in) long with additional pericarp and linear hilum.
