= Alviela River =

River in Santarém, Portugal

Coordinates: 39°17′40″N 8°36′58″W

Alviela
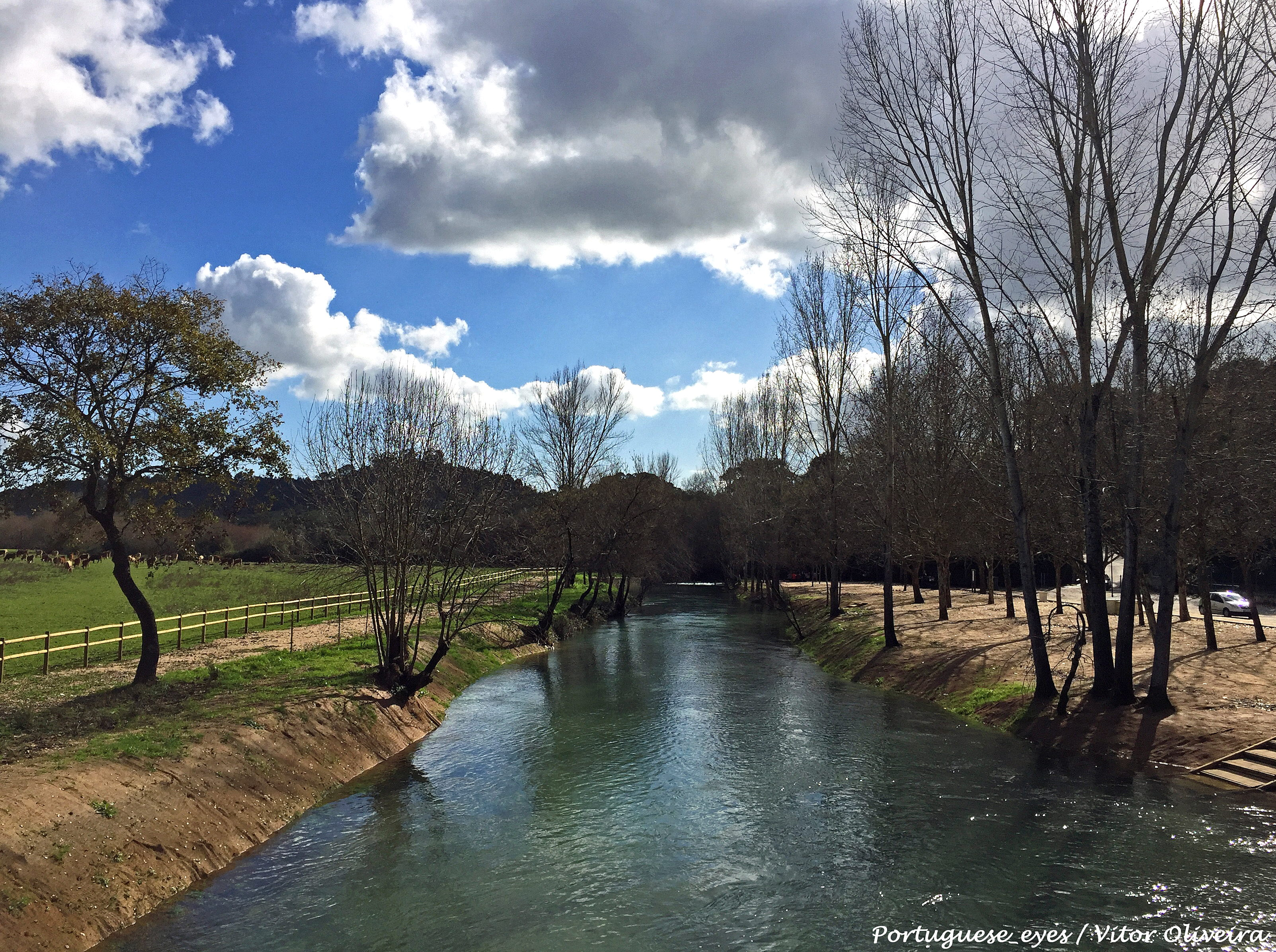

Physical characteristics
- Source
  - location: Olhos d’Água do Alviela, Alcanena
  - elevation: 135 m (443 ft)
- Mouth: Tagus
  - location: near Vale de Figueira
  - elevation: 23 m (75 ft)
- Length: 51.16 km (31.79 mi)
- Basin size: 180 km^{2} (69 sq mi)-331 km^{2} (128 sq mi)
- Discharge
  - maximum: 17 m^{3}/s (600 cu ft/s)

Basin features
- Tributaries: Ribeira dos Amiais, Ribeira de Carvalhos, Ribeira da Gouxaria

Alviela River (Portuguese: Rio Alviela, Portuguese pronunciation: [alviˈɛlɐ]) is a river in Portugal. It is 51.16 kilometres (31.79 mi) long. The Alviela spring is one of the deepest in the world and is locally connected to a cave complex that represents the most significant fluvio-karstic phenomena in Portugal, one which supports several bat colonies with more than 5,000 bats in total. In 2007, a population of troglomorphic Procambarus clarkii, an invasive crayfish species, was recorded in the Alviela spring, raising concerns about their potential effect on native stygobitic fauna. These crayfish lack all body pigment, although pigmented specimens were recorded in nearby surface waters.

The river has its origin in a karst spring. Ribeira dos Amiais, a losing stream, infiltrates through the Sumidouro da Ribeira dos Amiais, a ponor, only to return to the surface 250 m further on through a canyon.

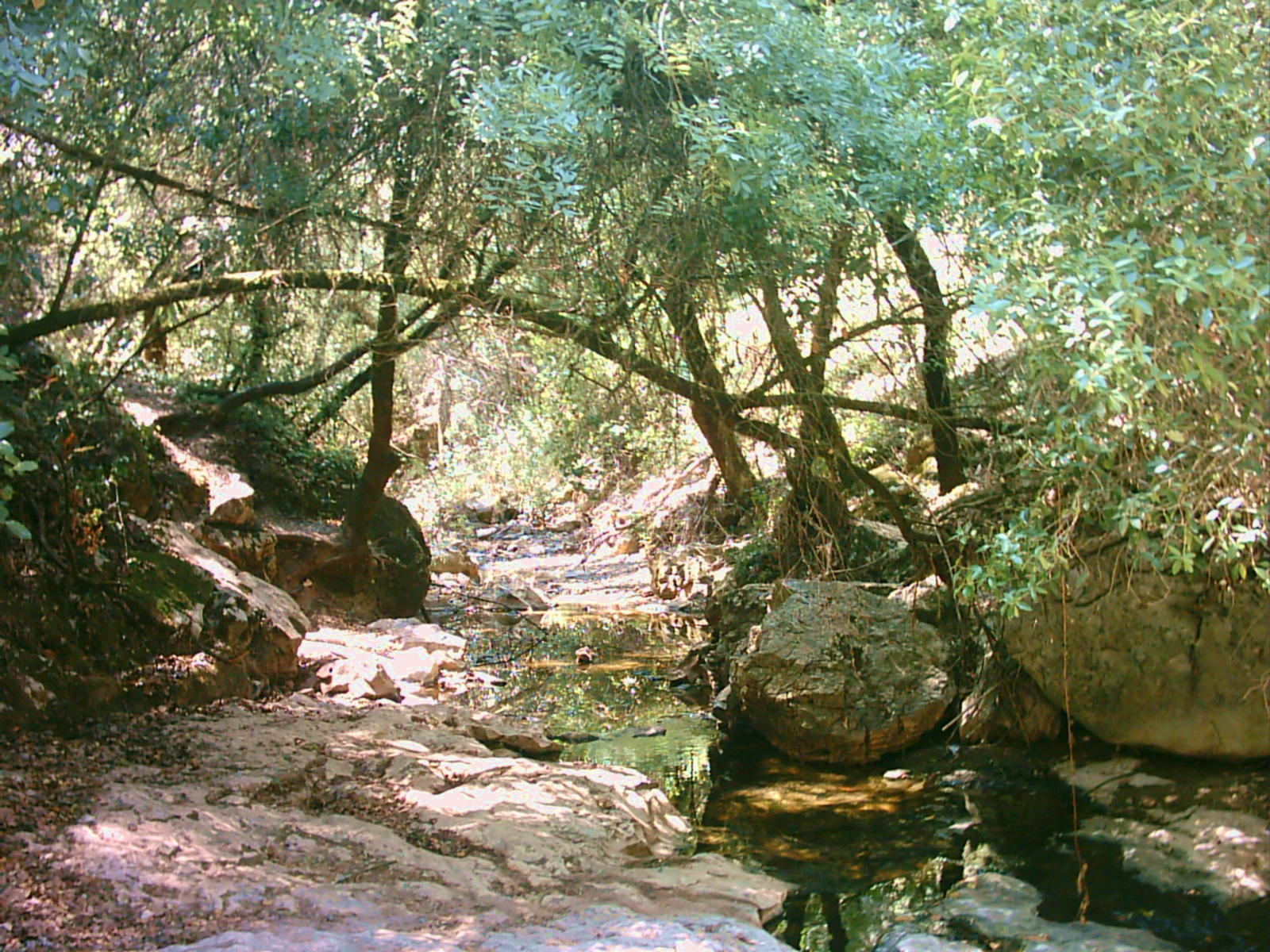
Ribeira dos Amiais, tributary of Alviela

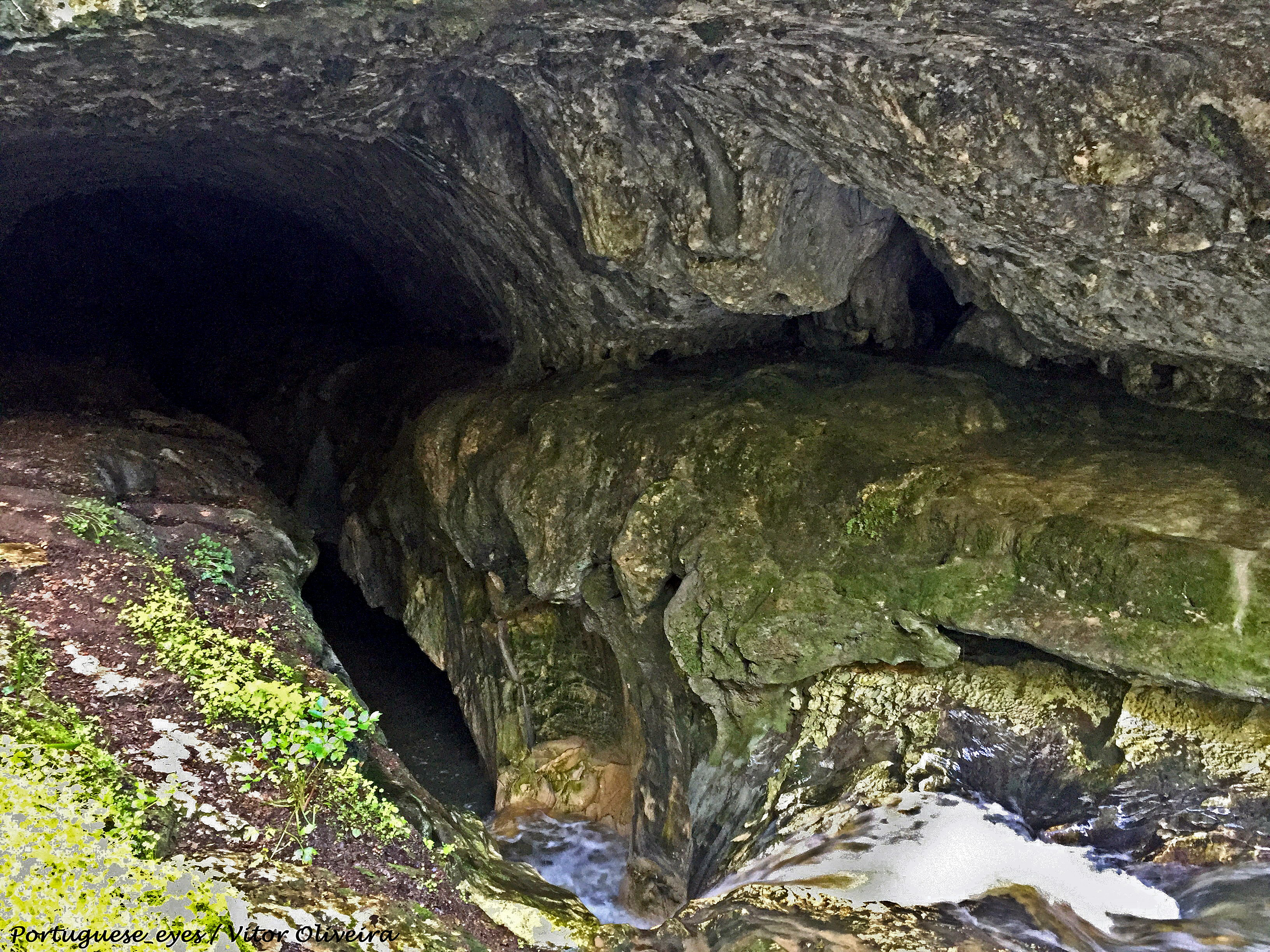
Sumidouro da ribeira dos Amiais, were the water from the stream infiltrates
