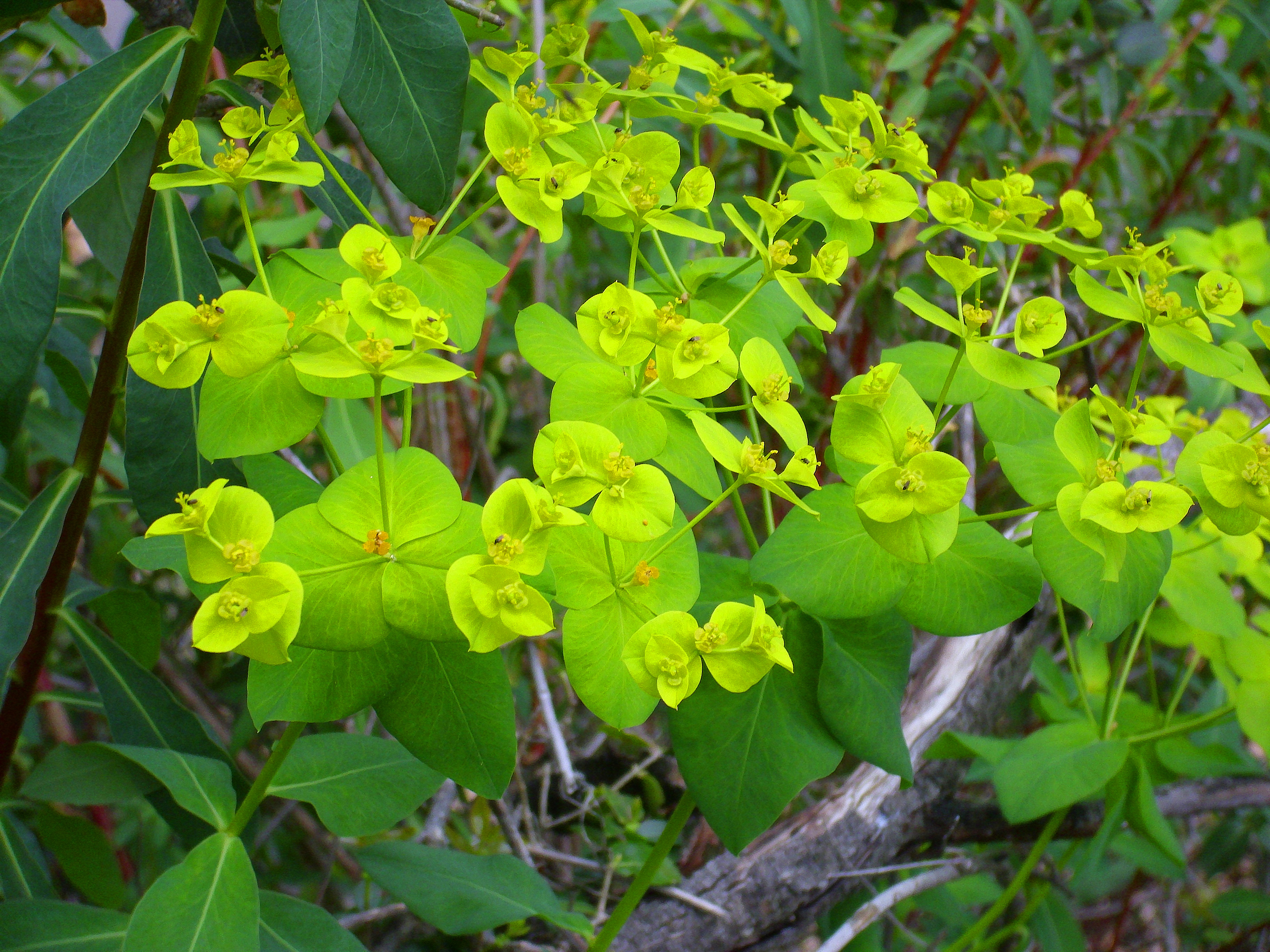

Conservation status
- Least Concern (IUCN 3.1)

Scientific classification
- Kingdom: Plantae
- Clade: Tracheophytes
- Clade: Angiosperms
- Clade: Eudicots
- Clade: Rosids
- Order: Malpighiales
- Family: Euphorbiaceae
- Genus: Euphorbia
- Species: E. paniculata

Binomial name
- Euphorbia paniculata Desf.

= Euphorbia paniculata =

Species of plant

Euphorbia paniculata is a species of flowering plant in the spurge family Euphorbiaceae, native to the Iberian Peninsula and North Africa in the western Mediterranean Basin.

== Description ==
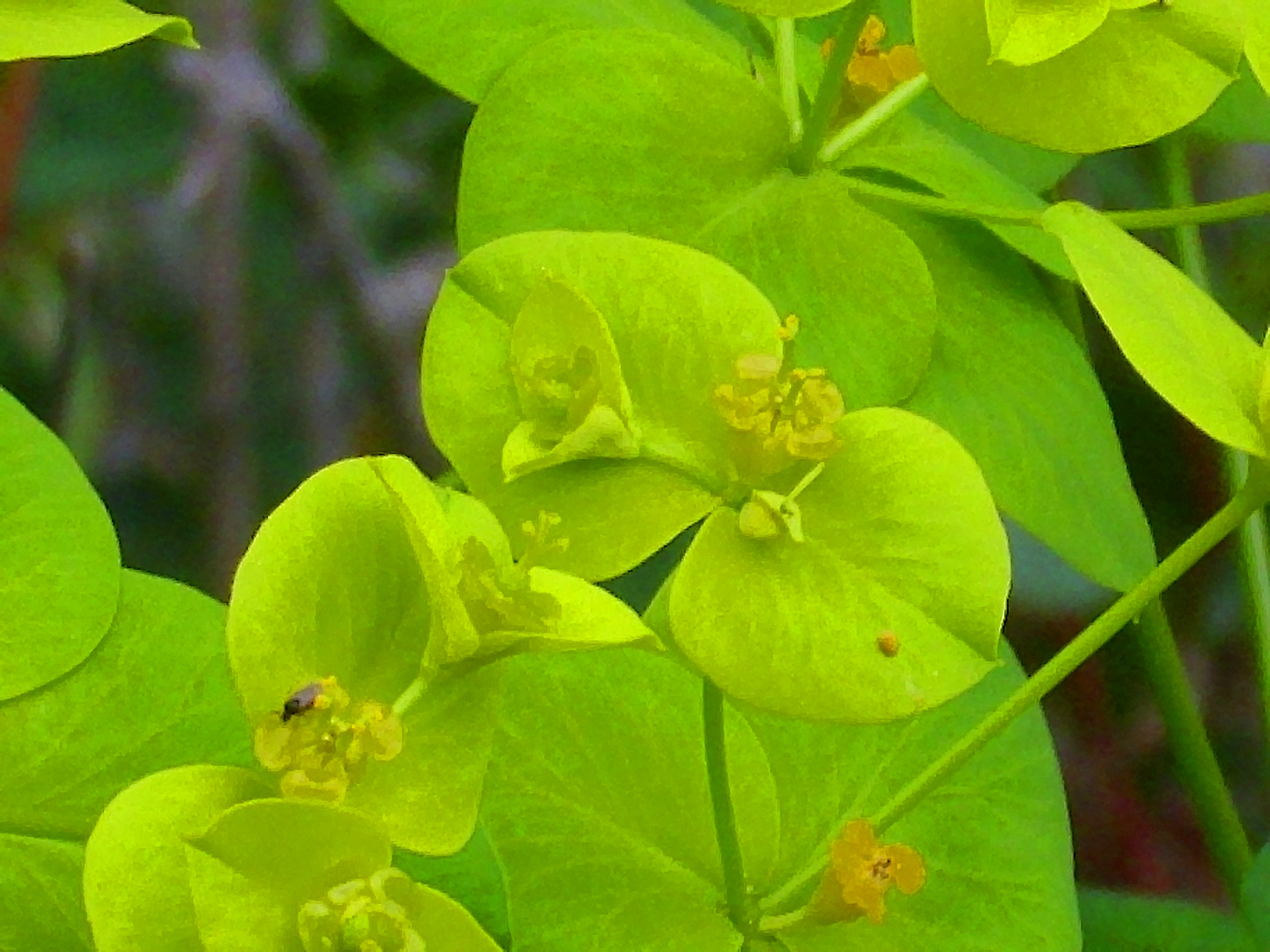
Leaves

Euphorbia paniculata is a perennial plant up to 1.5 m (4 ft 11 in) tall. It has a woody, thickened stock with erect stems, woody at the base with up to 11 fertile lateral branches. Leaves are green, 25–100 by 10–25 millimetres (0.98 in–3.94 in × 0.39 in–0.98 in), elliptical to lanceolate, sessile, generally amplexicaul with serrulate or entire margins. It has non-appendiculate yellow nectaries and ellipsoidal, black seeds.

== Distribution and habitat ==
Euphorbia paniculata is native to the southwestern Iberian Peninsula, northern Morocco and the northern coastline of Algeria and Tunisia. It inhabits forests and humid shrubland, in troughs and next to temporary waterways.

== Subspecies ==
There are four known subspecies, most of them occurring solely in Portugal:

Euphorbia paniculata subsp. calcicola (U.Schwarzer & Vicens):Native to the Sagres Peninsula in the extreme southwest of Portugal.

Euphorbia paniculata subsp. monchiquensis ((Franco & P.Silva) Vicens, Molero & C.Blanché): Native to the Monchique Range in southwest Portugal. Classified as Near Threatened.

Euphorbia paniculata subsp. paniculata: Native to the Iberian Peninsula and the northern littoral Maghreb.

Euphorbia paniculata subsp. welwitschii ((Boiss. & Reut.) Vicens, Molero & C.Blanché): Native to the area that comprises Estremadura in western central Portugal. Classified as Near Threatened.
