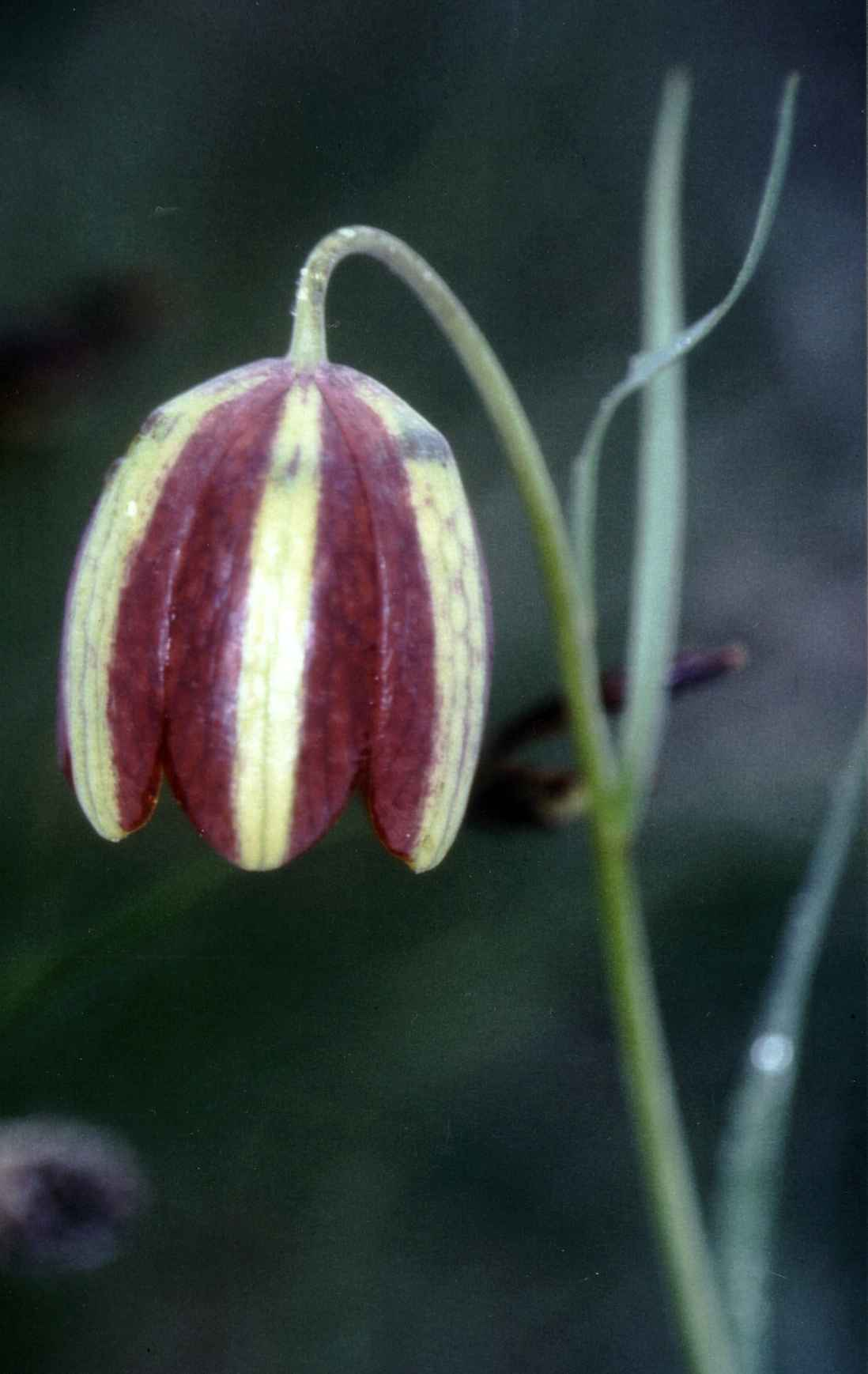

Scientific classification
- Kingdom: Plantae
- Clade: Tracheophytes
- Clade: Angiosperms
- Clade: Monocots
- Order: Liliales
- Family: Liliaceae
- Subfamily: Lilioideae
- Tribe: Lilieae
- Genus: Fritillaria
- Species: F. messanensis

Binomial name
- Fritillaria messanensis Raf. 1815 not Boiss. 1842

Synonyms
- Synonymy: Lilium gracile Ebel (syn of ssp gracilis); Fritillaria gracilis (Ebel) Asch. & Graebn. (syn of ssp gracilis); Fritillaria neglecta Parl. (syn of ssp neglecta ); Fritillaria sphaciotica Gand. (syn of ssp sphaciotica )

= Fritillaria messanensis =

Species of flowering plant

Fritillaria messanensis is a European species of flowering plant in the lily family Liliaceae, native to southeastern Europe: Italy (Sicily, Calabria), Greece (incl. Crete), Albania, former Yugoslavia.

Subspecies

- Fritillaria messanensis subsp. gracilis (Ebel) Rix - Ionian Islands of Greece, Albania, Serbia, Croatia, Montenegro, Bosnia, North Macedonia, Kosovo
- Fritillaria messanensis subsp. messanensis - Greece, Sicily, Calabria
- Fritillaria messanensis subsp. neglecta (Parl.) Nyman - Croatia, North Macedonia
- Fritillaria messanensis subsp. sphaciotica (Gand.) Kamari & Phitos - Crete
