= Estremadura Limestone Massif =

Geologic formation in Portugal

- Massif
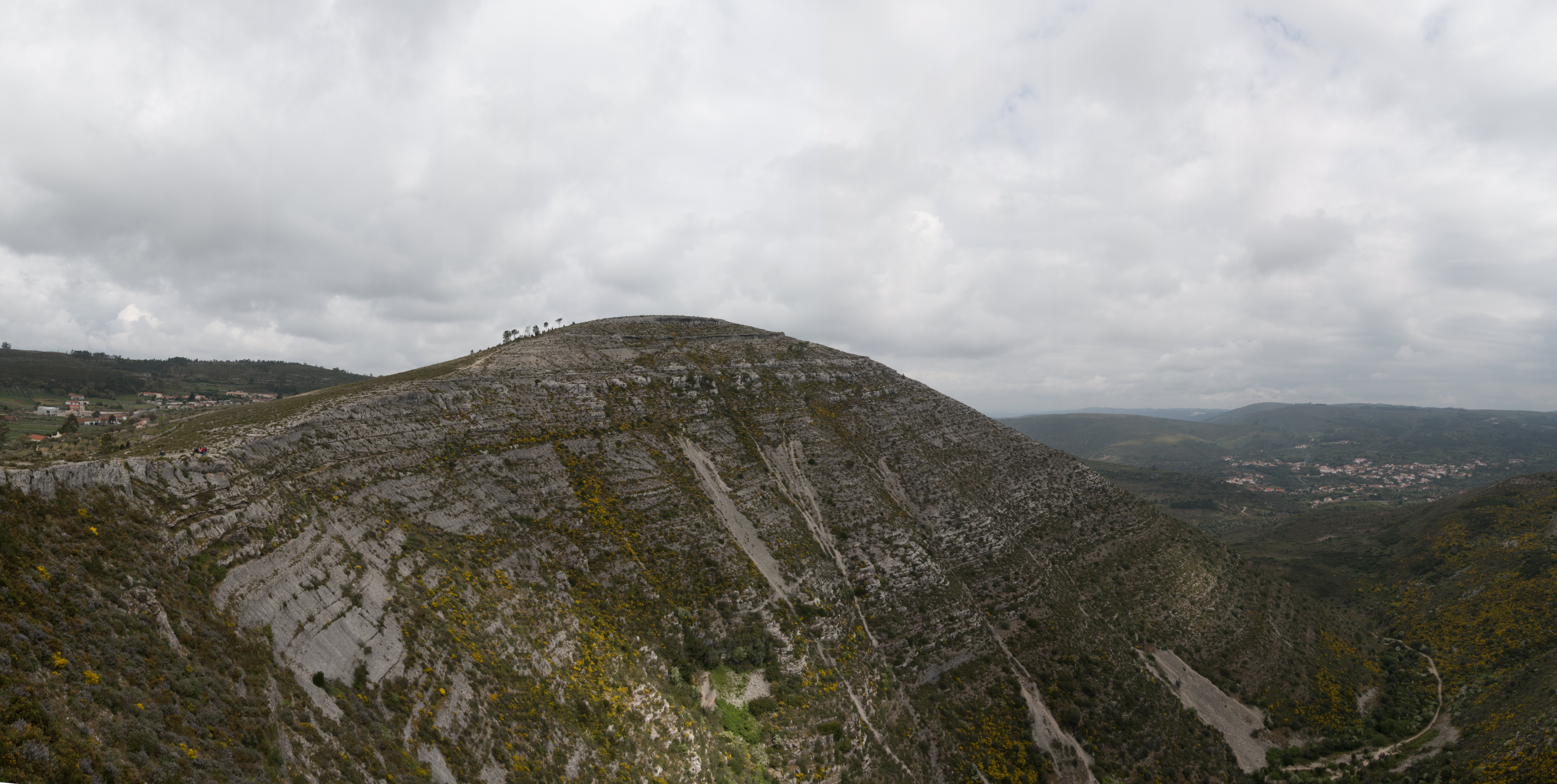
- Fórnea, a natural amphitheatre, part of the massif

- Location within Portugal
- Coordinates: 39°33′17″N 8°44′57″W
- Location: Estremadura & Ribatejo provinces, Portugal
- Age: Mesozoic

Area
  - Total: 900 km^{2} (350 sq mi)

The Estremadura Limestone Massif (Portuguese: Maciço Calcário Estremenho) is a massif located in central west Portugal. Approximately half of the massif is located within the Serras de Aire e Candeeiros Natural Park. The massif has an elongated NE-SW direction and englobes the municipalities of Batalha and Ourém in the north and northeast; Torres Novas and Alcanena in the east and southeast; Rio Maior in the south; and Alcobaça in the west.
