= Almonda =

Coordinates: 39.5057°N 8.6157°W

Almonda is a Portuguese village of around 300 inhabitants in the civil parish of Zibreira, within the municipality of Torres Novas and the Santarém District.

The village was named after the river Almonda, whose source is located nearby.

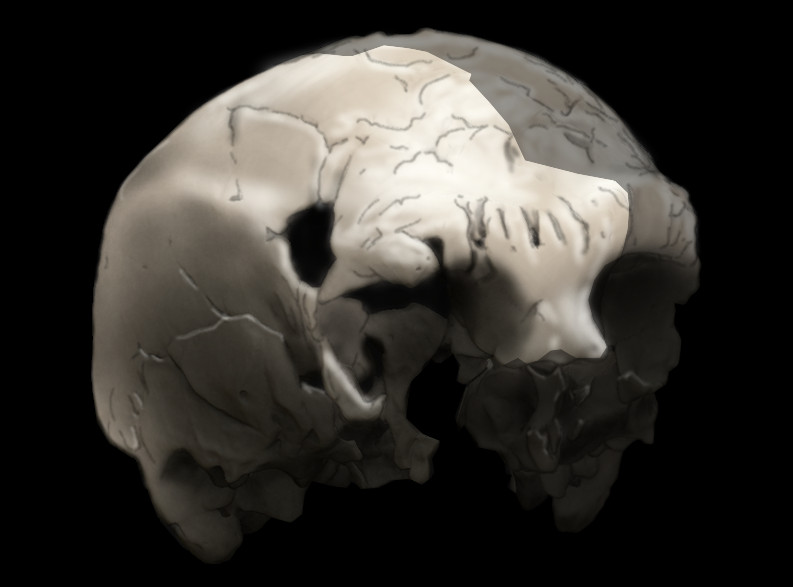
Aroeira 3 skull of a 400,000 year old Homo Heidelbergensis; the oldest trace of human history in Portugal

Almonda is noted for the Aroeira cave (possibly the largest cave in the country) in the Karst limestone landscape, where the 400,000 year old Aroeira 3 skull of a Homo Heidelbergensis was discovered in 2014. It is the oldest trace of human history in Portugal.

The local conditions of Karstic limestone topography and abundance of water provided the possibility of obtaining energy, and thus, in 1818, Domingos Ardisson established the Renova paper factory. The company is an important commercial engine of the Torres Novas region, and well-known both nationally and internationally. Although the company has expanded, the "old factory" continues to function.
