= Zibreira =

Civil parish in Torres Novas, Portugal

Coordinates: 39.5057°N 8.6157°W

Zibreira is a civil parish in Portugal, located within the municipality of Torres Novas, in the Santarém District. It is noted for the Aroeria cave, where the Aroeira 3 skull of a 400,000 year old Homo Heidelbergensis was found, being the oldest trace of human history in Portugal.

As of 2011, there are 1,028 inhabitants living within the 10.49 km^{2} (4.05 sq mi) parish, giving it a population density of around 98 people per sq kilometer (254 people per sq mile)

== Location ==
Zibreira sits near the junction of the A1 (North Motorway) which connects Lisbon, the capital, to Porto; and the A23 motorway (Portugal) (Auto-Estrada da Beira Interior) which connects to Guarda and Spain. This location has greatly aided its industrialization.

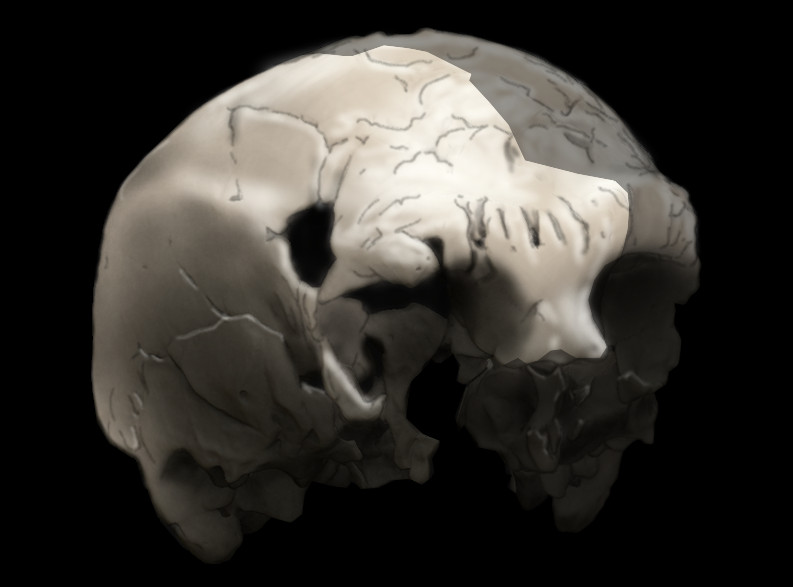
The Aroeira 3 skull of a 400,000 year old Homo Heidelbergensis - The oldest trace of human history in Portugal.

== Archaeology ==
The village of Almonda, within the parish of Zibreira, is noted for the Aroeira cave, where the 400,000 year old Aroeira 3 skull of a Homo Heidelbergensis was discovered in 2014. It is the oldest trace of human history in Portugal.

== Economy ==
Renova, (Fábrica de Papel do Almonda, SA), an international paper company, and Companhia de Torres Novas, a textiles company, are both based within the municipality.
