= João Cutileiro =

Portuguese sculptor (1937–2021)

João Cutileiro OSE
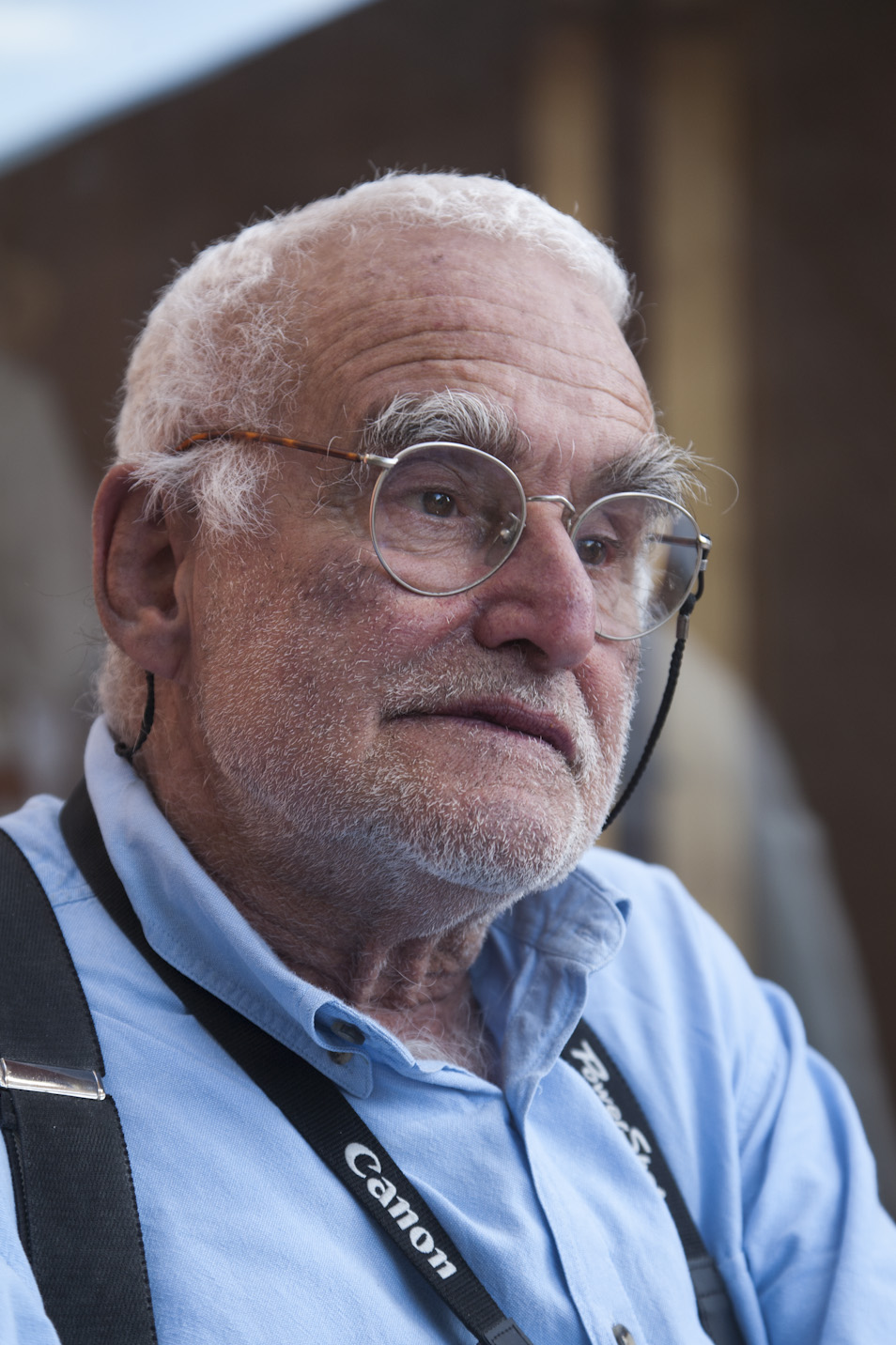
- João Cutileiro 2014
- Born: 26 June 1937; Lisbon, Portugal
- Died: 5 January 2021 (aged 83); Lisbon
- Known for: Sculptor

João Cutileiro OSE (26 June 1937 – 5 January 2021) was a Portuguese sculptor. He is responsible for a number of controversial female nudes in marble.

== Life ==
Cutileiro was born and died in Lisbon. He was the creator of several pieces of modern public sculpture, most famous being his statue of Sebastian of Portugal, inaugurated in 1973, in Lagos, in the Algarve. His work marks the end of the academic historical sculpture of the Estado Novo dictatorship and the beginning of a new era of contemporaneity in the Portuguese public sculpture.

== Works ==
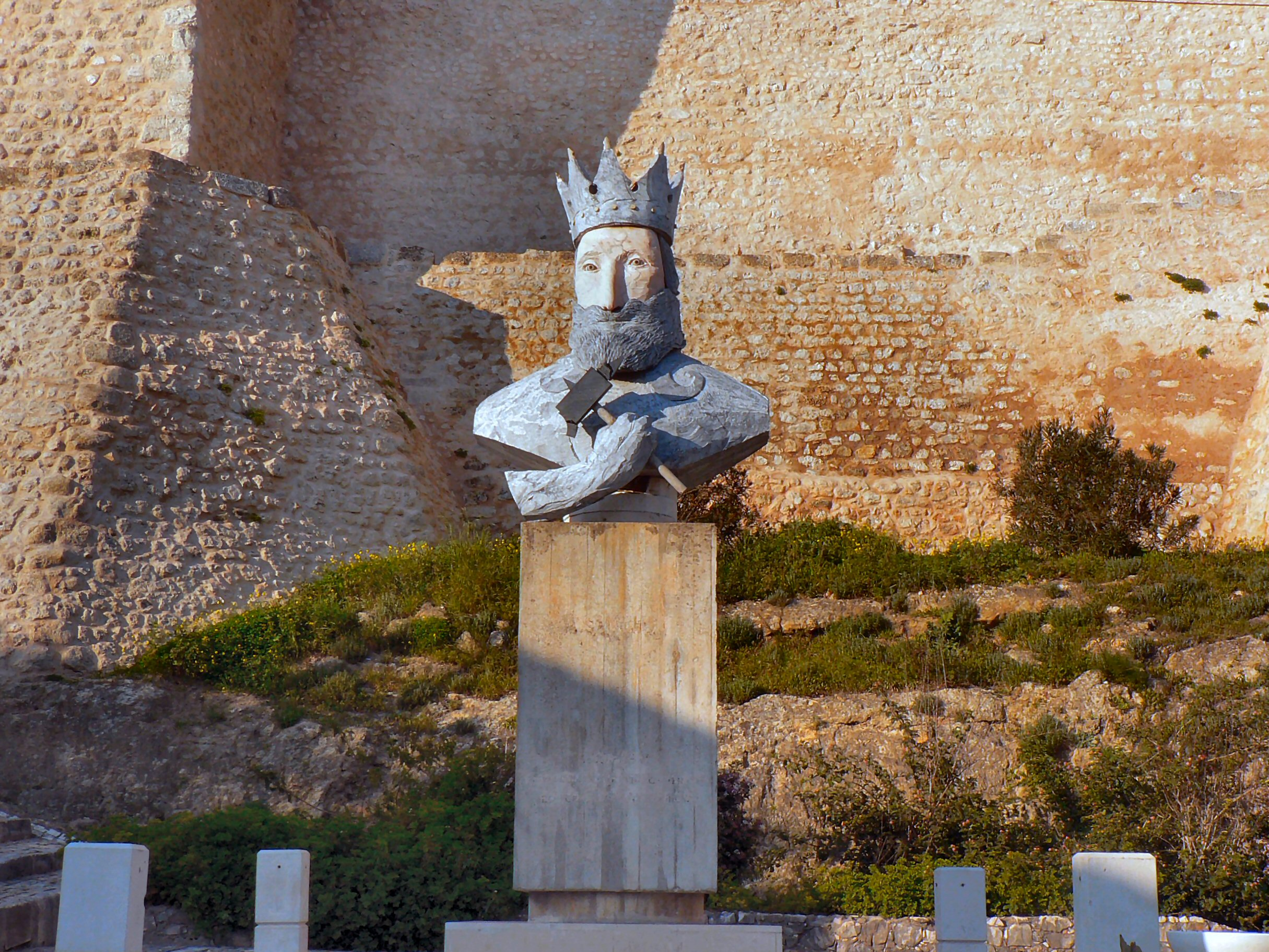
Statue of Sancho I of Portugal facing the Castelo de Torres Novas in Torres Novas, 2007

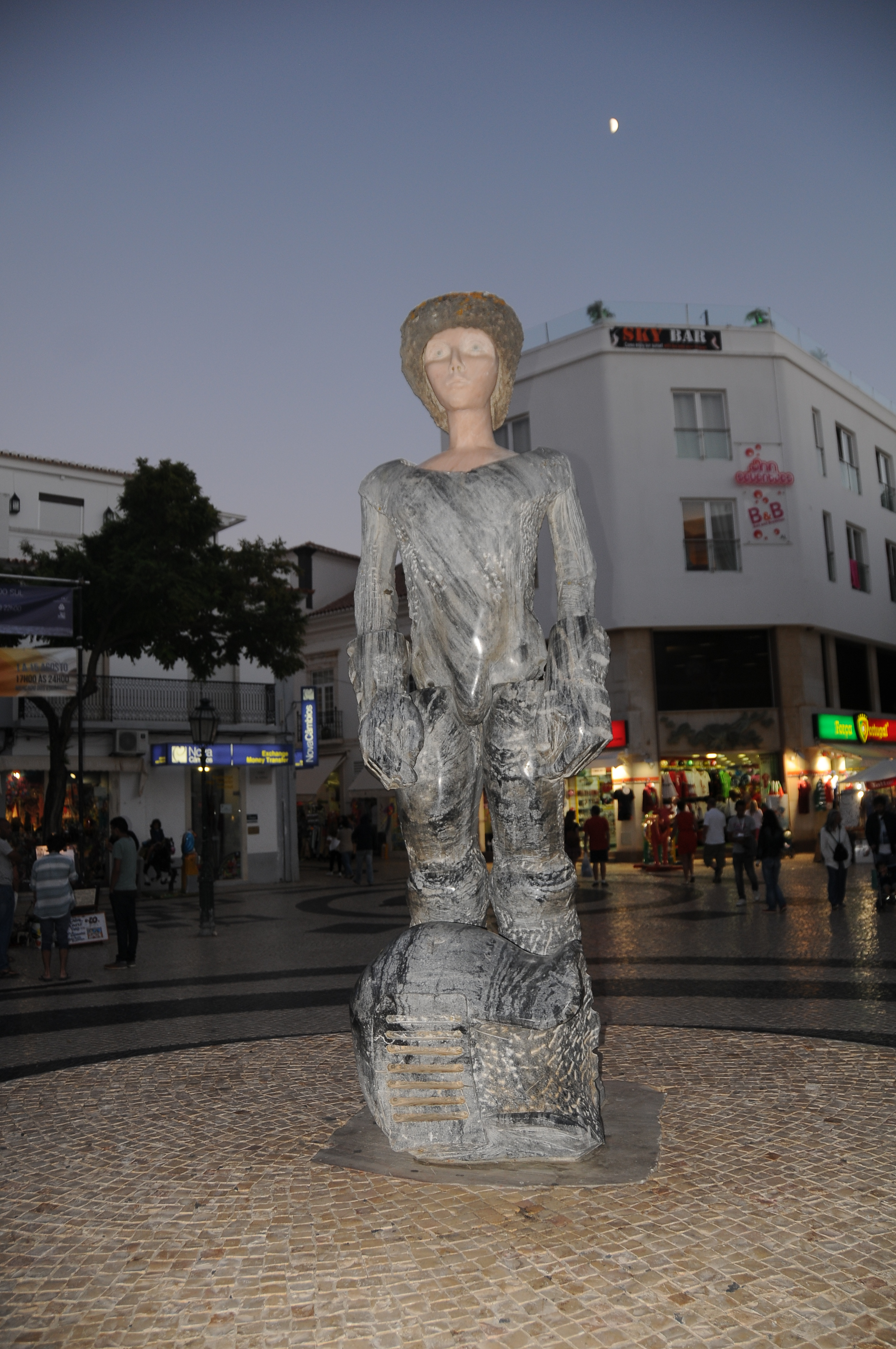
Statue of Sebastian of Portugal in Lagos, Algarve, 2014

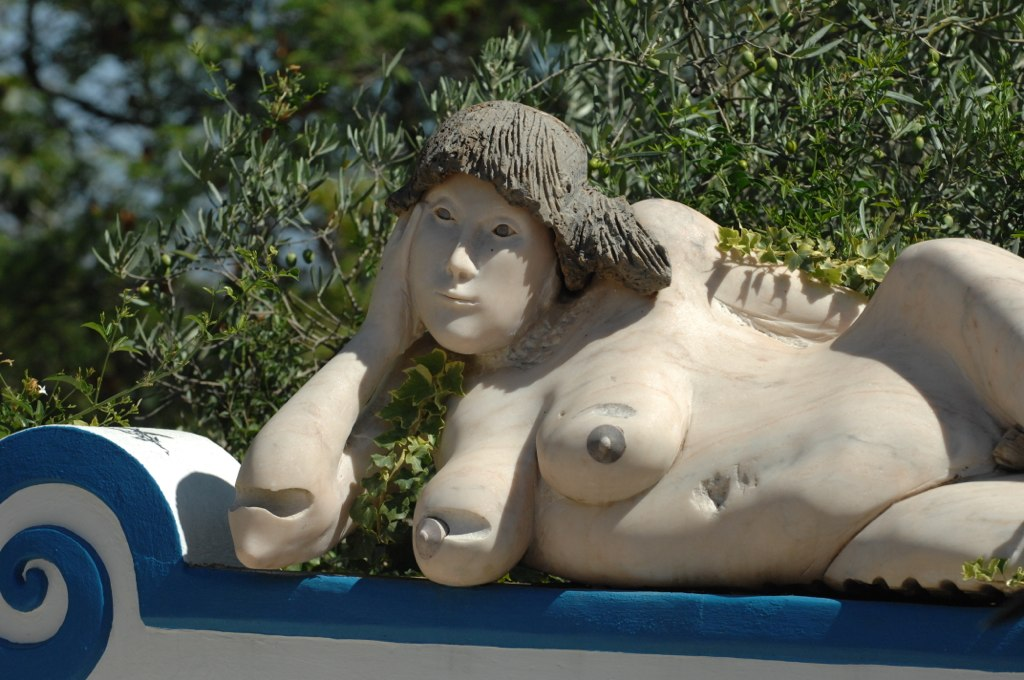
Sculpture at the Centro Cultural São Lourenço, Almancil, Algarve, 2009

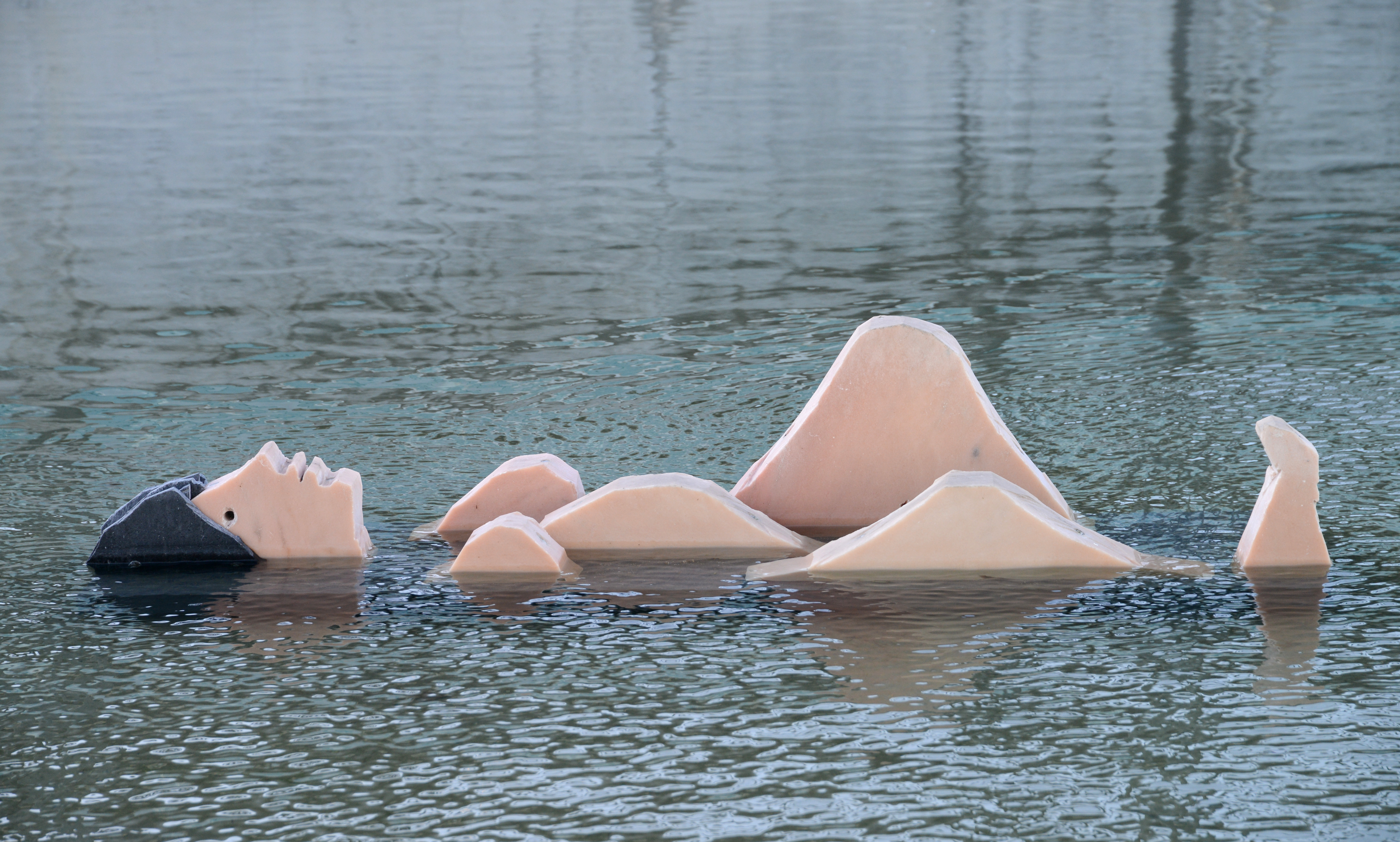
Sculptures in the Lago das Tágides, Parque das Nações, Lisbon, 2016

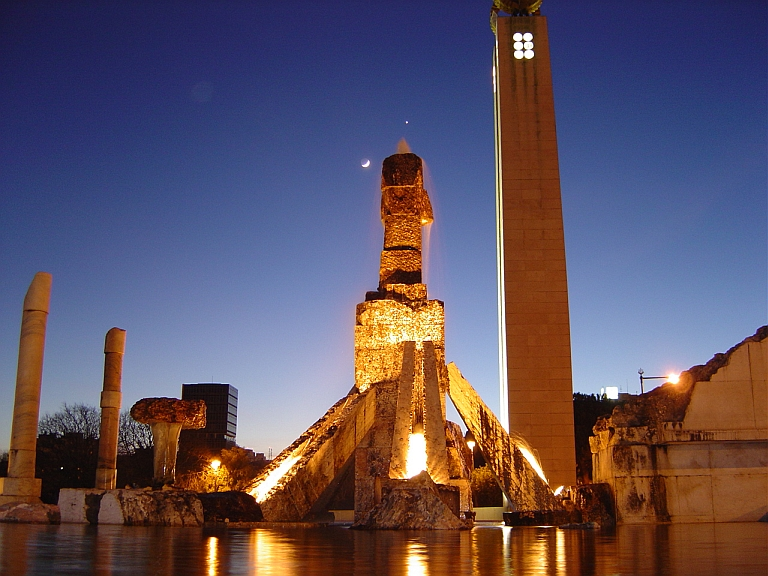
Monument to the Carnation Revolution, in Lisbon, 2004

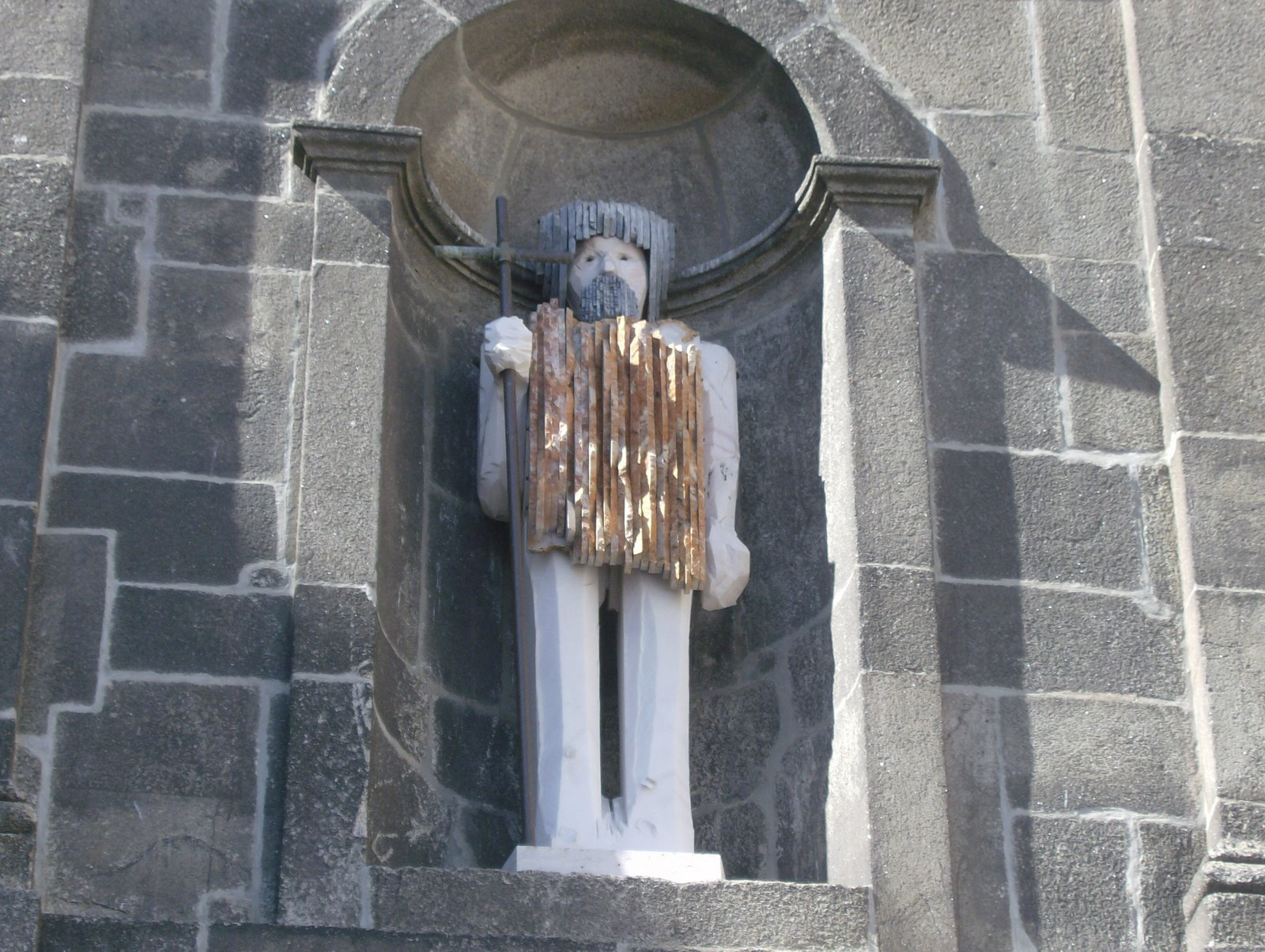
Statue of St John the Baptist in the Ribeira Square of Porto, 2007

== Exhibitions (selection) ==
=== Solo exhibitions ===
- João Cutileiro, Unikat-Galerie, Wuppertal 1976/1977 and Dortmund 1980
- João Cutileiro. Amantes, Centro Cultural São Lourenço, Almancil, Portugal, 1987
- João Cutileiro. Exposição antológica, Fundação Calouste Gulbenkian. Centro de Arte Moderna, Lisbon, Portugal 1990
- João Cutileiro. Cavaleiros - Homenagem a Paolo Uccello, Centro Cultural São Lourenço, Almancil, Portugal 1990
- João Cutileiro no Pico, Galeria Municipal das Lajes do Pico, Azores, 2011

=== Participations ===
- XV. São Paulo Art Biennial, São Paulo, 1979
- 2nd Congress of the international organization for sculptors in Washington, D.C., 1980
- Arte Contemporânea - Colecção Marie e Volker Huber, with José de Guimarães, Antoni Tàpies, Günter Grass, Ingo Kühl, Wolf Vostell, Rainer Wölzl, Corneille among others, Convento Espírito Santo, Loulé, Portugal, 1989.
