= Roman ruins of Villa Cardillio =

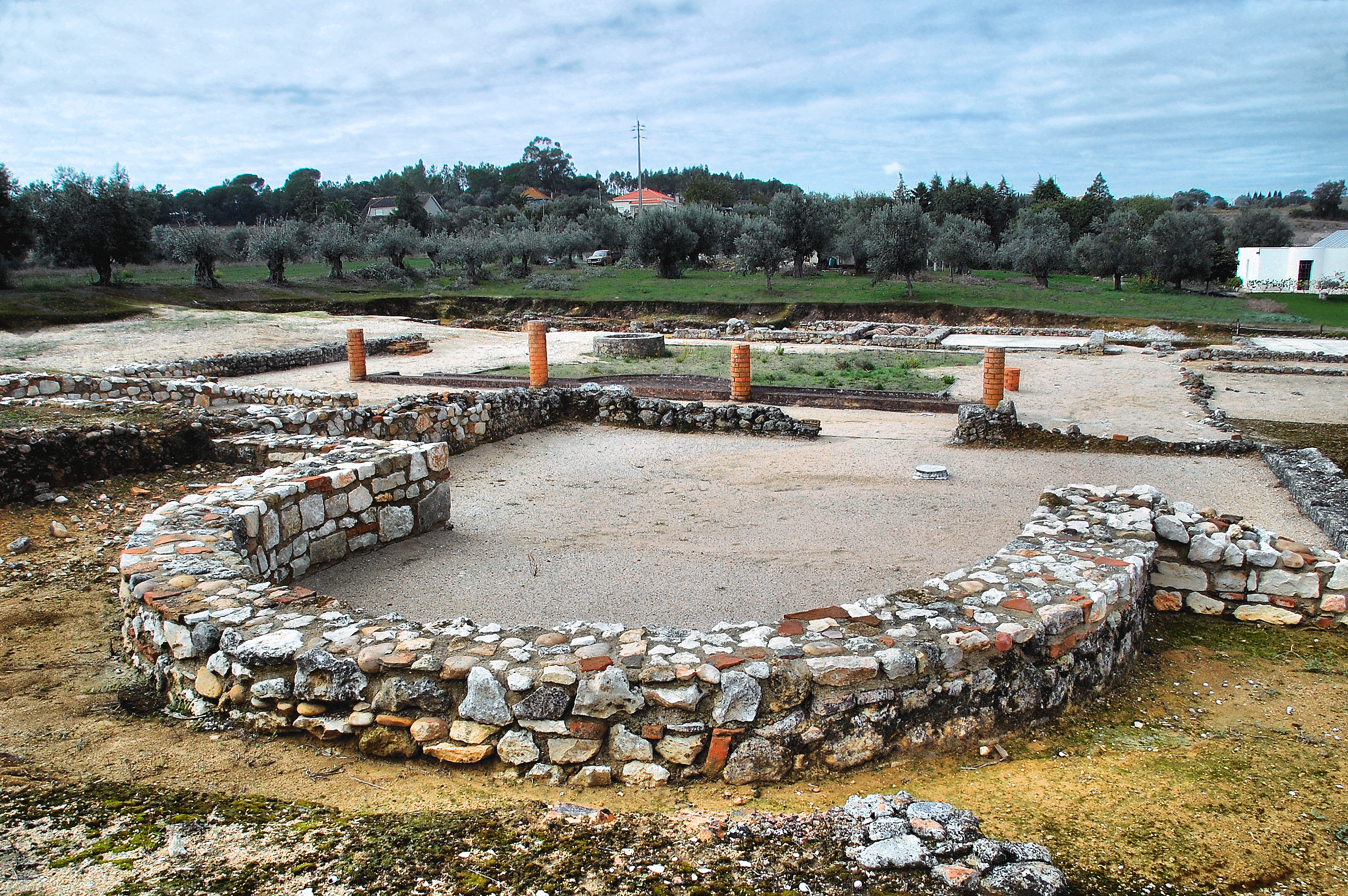
- Interactive map of Roman ruins of Villa Cardillio
- 39°27′11″N 8°31′43″W
- Type: Ruins
- Location: Santarém, Médio Tejo, Centre, Portugal

Site notes
- Elevation: 25 m (82 ft)
- Length: 65.0 m (213.3 ft)
- Width: 49.85 m (163.5 ft)
- Archaeologists: unknown
- Owner: Portuguese Republic
- Public access: Public 2 kilometres (1.2 mi) south of Torres Novas, in the locality of Caveira

The Roman ruins of Villa Cardillio (Portuguese: Ruinas romanas de Vila Cardílio) is an archaeological site located in central Portugal. Situated in the rural civil parish of Santa Maria, it is located approximately 3 km from the centre of the municipal seat of Torres Novas. Receiving its name from a mosaic pavement onsite, the specific translation of piece is still unclear, but assumed that the site was owned by a couple. The ruins were first excavated in 1962, yielding hundreds of coins and well as ceramics, bronze works, Assyrian and Egyptian glass works. Also revealed were some jewellery and a statue of Eros.

== History ==
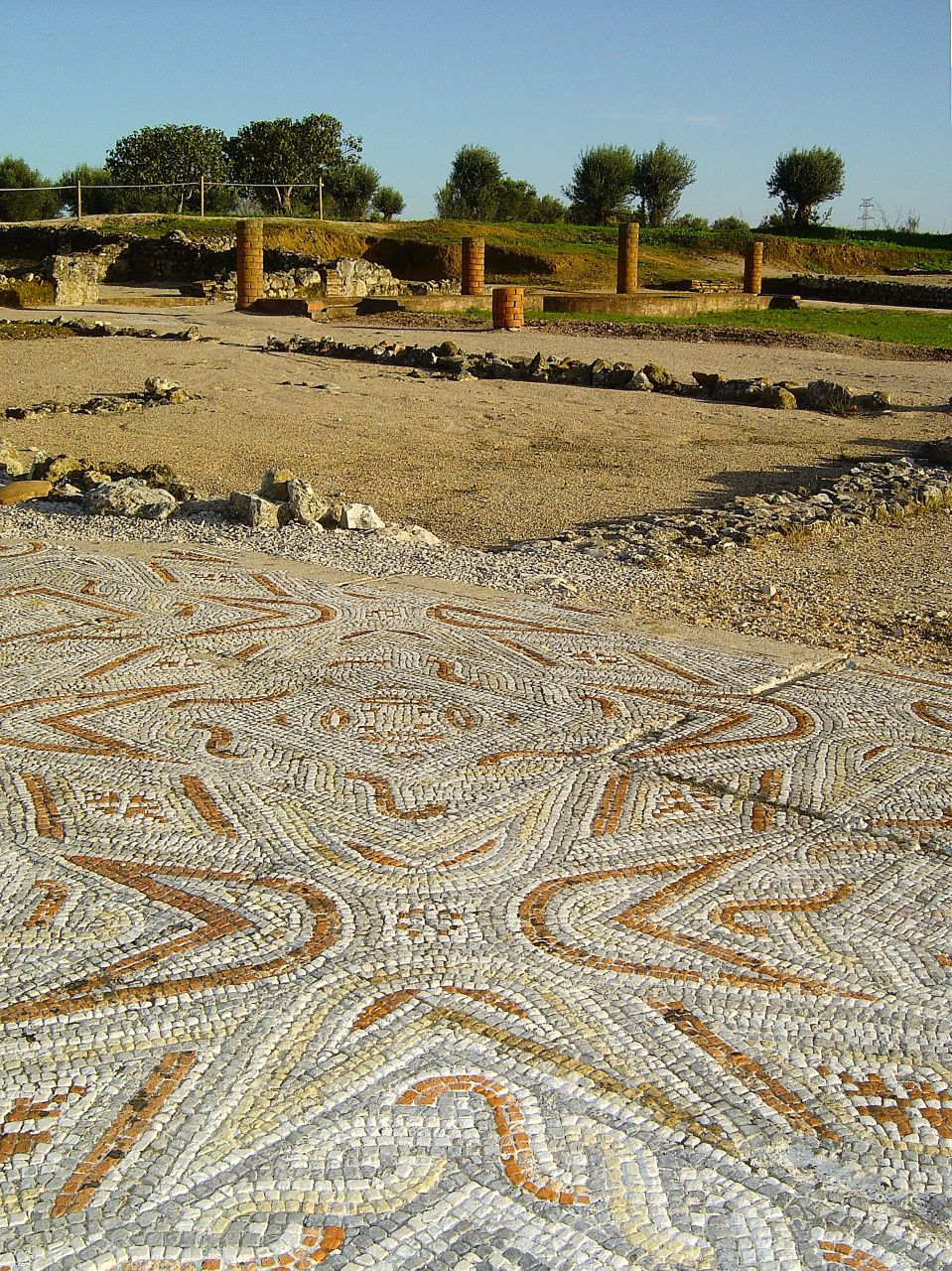
Mosaic tiles

The first construction of this "villa" occurred in the first century, of which only remains the primitive atrium and the remains of the thermal baths (which later adapted into the successive infrastructures).

Vila Cadílio's second phase occurred of around the 4th century, being the property of Cardílio and Avita.

In 1930, the site served as a mine, whose property-owner (from Casais da Caveira) removed 360 cartloads of rock from the site. The first archaeological interest in the site occurred in 1932; Jalhay and Afonso do Paço began investigating the grounds, cataloguing the built-up environment.

Formal excavations of the site occurred between 1963 and 1964, under the direction of Afonso do Paço. It was revised in 1980, under the direction of Jorge Alarcão and supervised by Drs. Monteiro and Quinteira, from the Faculty of Letters at the University of Coimbra. This intervention used a stratigraphic method of excavation, utilizing a graticule plan of the site. Of the remnants encountered until 1963, were the following: a clay statue, amphora, coins dated between 145 AD and 408 AD, and a statue of Eros in Carrara marble. During subsequent excavations in 1963–1964 fragments of terra sigillata were discovered, that included various periods of fabrication: ceramic utensils (such as vases, plates and amphorae); metal objects (a bird, a bronze bell and fibula; and glass, ivory and bone. Material from the 1980–1981 were not published.

On 1 June 1992, the site was placed under the authority of the Instituto Português do Património Arquitectónico (the forerunner of IGESPAR under decree-law 106F/92.

== Architecture ==
Example of the tilework found in Vila Cardílio

The site is located in the rural suburbs of the civil parish of Santa Maria, in the municipality of Torres Novas. On a cultivated plain that circles the Almonda River, it is 2 kilometres (1.2 mi) from the centre of Torres Novas.

The "curigum" collected water during the summer months, permitting not just irrigation, but cooling of the spaces. Over the pavement of many of the dependencies were encountered imbrex tiles, and studs that connected them within the structure.

It is a unique example of Roman villa, that actually identifies the property-owners: Cardílio and Avita. It is also an important villa that existed alongside the Roman towns of Santa Vitória do Ameixial and Torre de Palma, their mosaics comparable to those of Milreu and Conímbriga.

This vila was organized around the vast "peristylum", about 20 metres (66 ft) long and circled by twelve columns that protected a square 11 metres (36 ft)courtyard, with a 7 metres (23 ft) deep pool (in the extreme southern part of the property). Around this area was a 3.5 metres (11 ft) long section, with six mosaic panels in "opus-tessellatum" geometric patterns. Meanwhile, between these panels and the courtyard and 0.5 metres (1.6 ft) channel in "opus signinum", the "curigum".

To the east of the "peristylum", is the "exedra" a 10 metres (33 ft) by 6.5 metres (21 ft) area, paved in "opus signinum", at the back of which is an apse, proceeded by a porticom with four (in front) and two lateral columns.

West of the "peristylum", is the "ostium", the principal entrance, with mosaic pavement, forming various decorative, geometric and figurative panels. On one of these is the inscription: "VIVENTES / CARDILIUM / ETAVITAM / FELIXTURRE", while on another is a figure of a Roman couple, circled by craters, a sickle, birds, diametrically opposed 2x2 posts and with flowers in the corners. The inscription of the Roman property owners has had differencing interpretations, that included: "Felix of Turre created the mosaics in homage to Cardílio and Avita"; "Felix created the picture of Cardílio and Avita, in life, in the locality called Turris"; "Torre was happy while Cardílio and Avita lived"; "Cardílio and Avita lived here in the happy tower" The objects in the property-owner's panel, the sickle and the craters, may have represented the cultivation of wheat and vineyard.

There also exist vestiges of a "frigidarium" (cold baths), "caldarium" (hot baths) and respective "hypocaustum", as well as a pool, to the west of the"peristylum". These thermal zones are actually over older deposits, of which two tanks still remain. To the north of the"ostium" is a tank encircled by columns on three sides, which may have represented the atrium of an older building.

== See also ==
- History of Portugal
- Timeline of Portuguese history
