= Cutileiro =

Cutileiro is a Portuguese surname. Notable people with the surname include:

- João Cutileiro (1937–2021), Portuguese sculptor
- José Cutileiro (1934–2020), Portuguese diplomat and writer
