= Aldeia do Mato e Souto =

Civil parish in Portugal

- Civil parish
- Location in Portugal
- Coordinates: 39.542°N 8.272°W
- Country: Portugal
- Region: Oeste e Vale do Tejo
- Intermunic. comm.: Médio Tejo
- District: Santarém
- Municipality: Abrantes

Area
  - Total: 44.77 km^{2} (17.29 sq mi)

Population (2021)
  - Total: 674
  - Density: 15.1/km^{2} (39.0/sq mi)
- Time zone: UTC+00:00 (WET)
  - Summer (DST): UTC+01:00 (WEST)

União das Freguesias de Aldeia do Mato e Souto is a freguesia ("civil parish") in the municipality of Abrantes, Portugal. It was formed in 2013 by the merger of the former parishes Aldeia do Mato and Souto. The population in 2011 was 859, in an area of 44.77 km^{2} (17.29 sq mi).
