= Maria Lúcia Vassalo Namorado =

Portuguese writer, journalist and social reformer

- Born: 1 June 1909; Torres Novas, Portugal
- Died: 9 February 2000 (aged 90); Lisbon, Portugal
- Other names: Maria Lúcia Vassalo Namorado Silva Rosa
- Occupation(s): Author, journalist, editor, social reformer
- Known for: Publisher of Os Nossos Filhos (Our Children)

Maria Lúcia Vassalo Namorado (1 June 1909 – 9 February 2000) was a Portuguese writer, poet, journalist, teacher and social reformer, and director of the magazine Os nossos filhos (Our Children).

== Early life ==
Maria Lúcia Vassalo Namorado Silva Rosa was born on 1 June 1909 in Torres Novas, in the Santarém district of Portugal, the daughter of António Florentino Namorado, who was a Republican and a Freemason, and Ana Perpétua Vassalo, who was a cousin of Manuel António Vassalo e Silva, last Governor of Portuguese India, and of the writers Maria Lamas and Alice Vieira. She lived the first years of her life in Torres Novas, studying in government schools. When she was ten years old the family moved to the Portuguese capital, Lisbon, where, having revealed a talent for writing, she continued her schooling. This was interrupted by ill health: she suffered from a lung disease that kept her out of school for a year and then caught typhoid fever that meant she did not graduate from high school, despite having been top of the class. The family returned to Torres Novas in 1928. In 1930, while on vacation with her mother, she met Joaquim Jerónimo da Silva Rosa, a clerk from Coimbra. They married in ceremonies in Torres Novas and in Coimbra. Three years later, she had a son, the first of three, in Penacova near Coimbra, where the couple had chosen to live.

== Writing ==
Namorado started her published writing career with short stories and poems in periodicals, such as A Renascença (The Renaissance) and A Mocidade (Youth), the weekly publication of the Liga da Mocidade Republicana (League of the Republican Youth). In 1929 she began collaborating with Maria Lamas on the magazine Modas e Bordados (Fashions and Embroidery) published as a supplement to the daily newspaper O Século. For thirteen years she would sign her articles with the different pseudonyms, "Milú", "Maria Lúcia", "Tricana", "Marianela" and "Dona Experience", depending on the subject covered by the article, which could range from cooking recipes, childcare tips, advice for teenagers, and even advice columns of the Agony Aunt type. In 1932, she began to write fortnightly in the children's section and the women's section of the newspaper Notícias de Penacova, which was by this time edited by her husband, signing her articles under her maiden name or with the pseudonym "Qui-Quiriqui". In 1937, the family moved to Golegã, where she published her first book in the same year, a novella entitled Negro e Cor de Rosa (Black and pink), under the name Maria Lúcia. Three years later, she moved to Lisbon, where she wrote A Mulher dona de casa (The housewife) in 1943 and Joaninha quer casar (Joaninha wants to get married: advice to girls) in 1944.

== Publishing ==
In June 1942, Namorado started to publish the monthly magazine Os Nosso Filhos (Our Children), which she directed and edited with the financial support of António Júlio Vassalo, her cousin. The magazine was addressed to parents and published articles written by both supporters and opponents of the authoritarian Estado Novo regime, including Alice Vieira and Mário Castrim. The magazine covered some of the biggest problems that mothers faced in their daily lives: lack of education; lack of family planning; lack of support for working women; domestic violence; and high infant-mortality rates. Another recurring theme was the need for school libraries as a way of combating illiteracy. It ran campaigns to help and support disadvantaged children, such as those with disabilities or even victims of the Second World War, for which work it was awarded the Cross of Merit of the Portuguese Red Cross in November 1947. In addition to the magazine, Namorado also created a publishing house with the same name, Os Nosso Filhos, which published her works and those of other children's writers, such as Matilde Rosa Lopes de Araújo, Virgínia Lopes de Mendonça, Maria Elisa Nery de Oliveira and Maria Isabel César Anjo. She also directed a biweekly radio programme called "Programme for Mothers".

== Activism ==
In the 1940s, Namorado became a member of the Portuguese League of Social Protection , where she proposed the creation of a Child Protection League (although it never materialized). She also joined Maria Lamas as a member of the Conselho Nacional das Mulheres Portuguesas (National Council of Portuguese Women), where she was secretary of the general assembly and president of its propaganda committee. Her three books were included in the "Exhibition of Books Written by Women" in 1947, which was organised by the National Council. She joined the Associação Feminina Portuguesa para a Paz, (Portuguese Women's Peace Association - AFPP) and the Liga Portuguesa Abolicionista (Portuguese Abolitionist League), an organization devoted to the abolition of prostitution. She was also associated with the Movement of Democratic Unity, an umbrella grouping of organizations, which was founded in October 1945 and was opposed to the authoritarian government of the time.

== Censorship ==
During the 1950s, Os Nossos Filhos was heavily targeted by Portugal's censors. Namorado encouraged the use of pseudonyms to protect the contributors and asked her writers to practise an element of "self-censorship". This did not please all of her collaborators but did ensure the survival of several authors who were prohibited from working. This kept the publication going until 1958 when monthly publication was suspended. Until 1964 one annual issue was produced and then Os Nosso Filhos closed down as a result of financial difficulties and repression by the regime.

== Later activities ==
Forced to look for a new livelihood, close to the age of fifty and separated from her husband, Namorado returned to her studies to obtain diplomas as a pre-school and primary teacher, as well as beginning to learn English and French. In 1959 she took a position at the Sain Foundation , which supported the integration of the blind into Portuguese society. Continuing her activism, she joined the Portuguese Association of Deaf People, the Portuguese League for the Protection of Disabled People, the Portuguese Association for Education through Art, and the International Council of Books for Young People, and was approved as a member of the Portuguese Society of Writers. She continued to write occasional stories on children's pages of newspapers and magazines and also gave advice on reading for parents and on food for children, using her own name and a variety of pseudonyms. In 1966 she published A História do Pintainho Amarelo (The Story of the Yellow Chick), a children's story book on the rehabilitation of the blind in Portugal, with illustrations by Maria Keil; in 1968 A História de um Bago de Milho; and in 1971 O Segredo da Serra Azul and the collection, Os Livros da Grande Roda, which contained stories by other authors.

== After the Carnation Revolution ==
After the Carnation Revolution in 1974, which saw the overthrow of the Estado Novo, Namorado worked as a teacher of children's literature. She took courses in Music Therapy, Political Philosophy, and other subjects. She participated in Adult Literacy campaigns, and also in various initiatives of the Communist Party, despite not being a member. She supported the Centre for Continuing Education (Centro De Formação Educacional Permanente) and was one of the founders of the Child Support Institute.

Maria Lúcia Vassalo Namorado died on 9 February 2000, at her home in Lisbon. She donated her intellectual estate to the Faculty of Psychology and Educational Sciences of the University of Lisbon.
