= Assentiz =

Assentiz can refer to:

- Assentiz, Rio Maior, a civil parish in the Portuguese municipality Rio Maior
- Assentiz, Torres Novas, a former civil parish in the Portuguese municipality Torres Novas, now merged with Marmeleira to form Marmeleira e Assentiz
