= Castle of Torres Novas =

Portuguese castle

Coordinates: 39°28′48″N 8°32′26″W

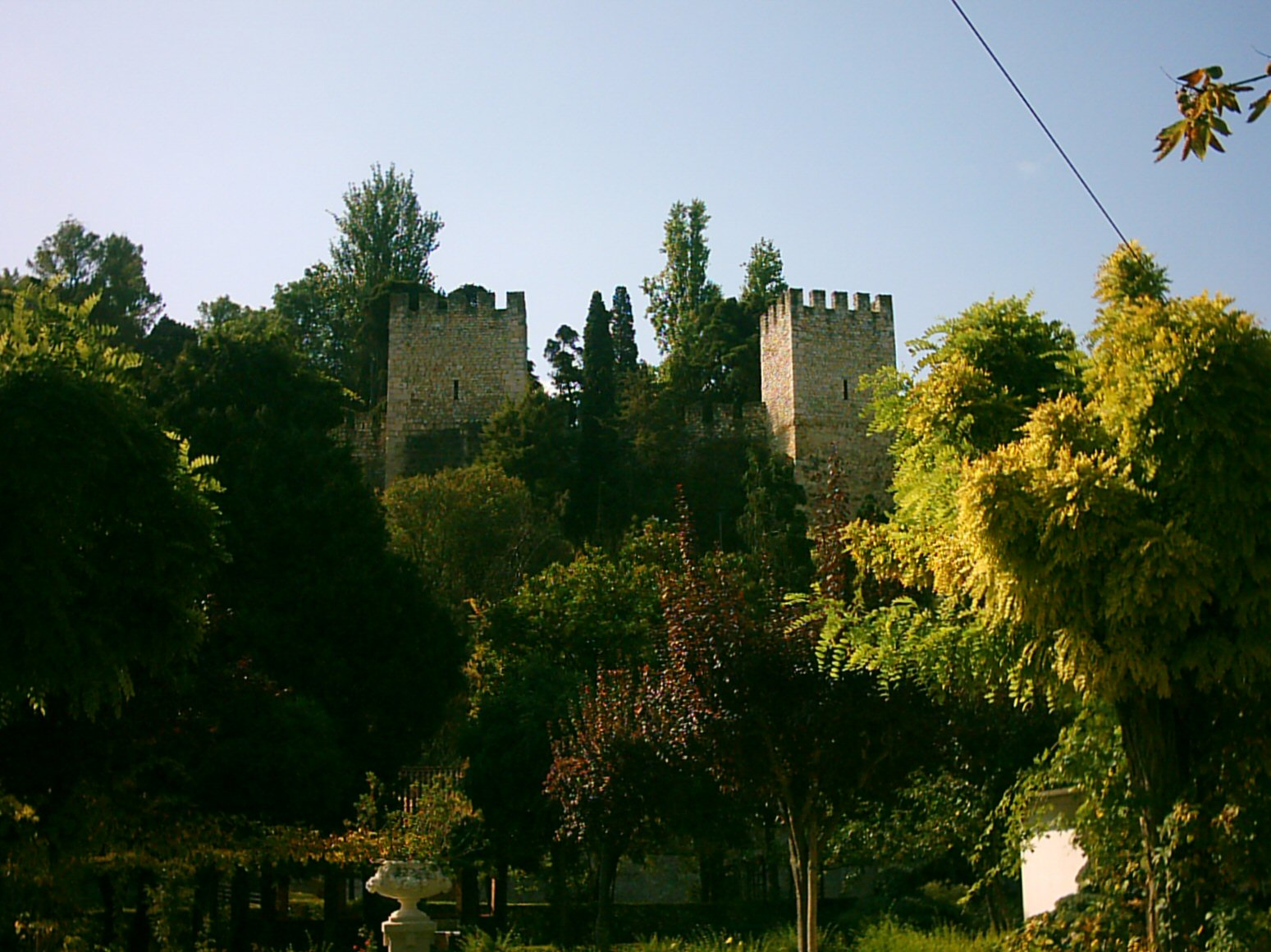
Torres Novas Castle

The Castle of Torres Novas (Portuguese: Castelo de Torres Novas) is a medieval castle in the civil parish of Torres Novas (São Pedro), Lapas e Ribeira Branca, municipality of Torres Novas, Portuguese district of Santarém.

It is classified as a National Monument.
