= Quintas (footballer) =

Portuguese footballer (born 1965)

Personal information
- Full name: Luís Fernando Quintas dos Santos
- Date of birth: 12 April 1965 (age 61)
- Place of birth: Torres Novas, Portugal
- Height: 1.78 m (5 ft 10 in)
- Position: Forward

Youth career
- 1979–1983: Torres Novas

Senior career*
Years	Team	Apps	(Gls)
1983–1986	Alcanenense		
1986–1989	Mirense		
1989–1991	O Elvas	66	(9)
1991–1992	Belenenses	10	(1)
1992–1994	União de Leiria	44	(2)
1994–1995	Penafiel	10	(1)
1995–1997	Feirense	62	(4)
1997–1999	Beira-Mar	40	(0)
1999–2000	Nacional	24	(8)
2000–2001	Câmara Lobos	43	(4)
2001–2002	Machico	21	(0)
2002–2003	Camacha	23	(7)
2003–2004	Câmara Lobos		
2004–2005	ACD São Vicente		
2005–2006	Bom Sucesso Funchal		
- * Club domestic league appearances and goals

Luís Fernando Quintas dos Santos, known as Quintas (born 12 April 1965) is a former Portuguese football player.

== Club career ==
He made his Primeira Liga debut for Beira-Mar on 21 August 1998 in a game against Braga.

== Honours ==
Beira-Mar

- Taça de Portugal: 1998–99
