= Cave of Aroeira =

Cave and archaeological site in Portugal

- Gruta da Aroeira
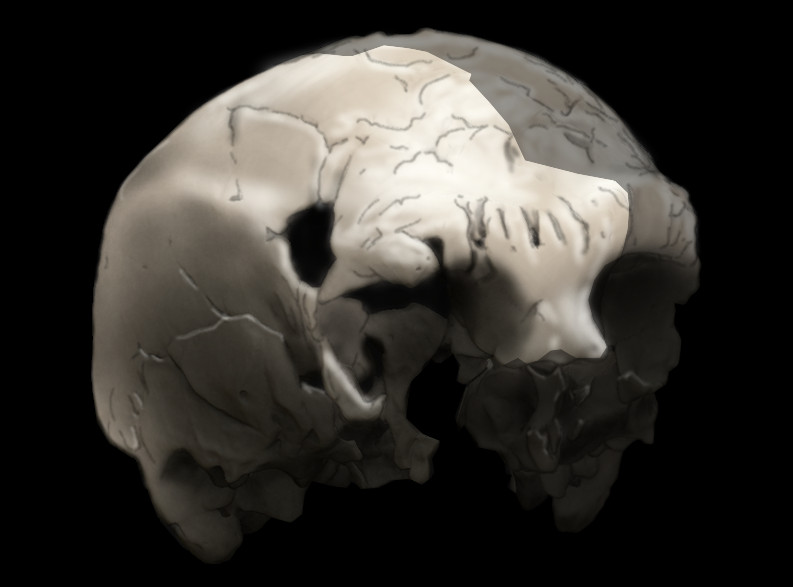
- Aroeira 3 - 400,000 years old Homo heidelbergensis The earliest human trace in Portugal

- Location within Portugal
- Location: Almonda, Zibreira, Torres Novas, Santarém, Portugal
- Coordinates: 39.5057°N 8.6157°W
- Discovery: 2017
- Geology: Karst
- Entrances: 1
- Cave survey: 2017

The Cave of Aroeira (European Portuguese pronunciation: [ɐɾuˈɐjɾɐ]) is an archaeological and paleoanthropological site in the Portuguese Estremadura Limestone Massif. The cave is located in the village of Almonda, in the civil parish of Zibreira, in the municipality of Torres Novas in the district of Santarém. The cave contained stones from the Paleolithic Acheulean culture, and the skull of Homo heidelbergensis, circa 400,000 years old. The discovery of Aroeira 3 was announced in spring 2017 - the earliest human trace in Portugal.

== Exploration ==
The Cave of Aroeira is part of the Almonda-Karst system, This system is formed of passages excavated at different elevations whose intersections with the 70-m-high escarpment rising above the extant spring of the Almonda River, a tributary of the Tagus River, correspond to fossil outlets of its subterranean course. The entrance to the cave was completely sealed by roof collapses when the excavation began in 1998.

The deposits in the cave are about four meters thick and are categorised in three stratigraphic layers, from the lowest of which the fossil Aroeira 3 was salvaged. Various independent analyses revealed an age of approximately 400,000 years, due to the detection of the oxygen isotope stage MIS 11c. The most recent deposits in the cave have been dated to an age of 60,000 to 40,000 years (MIS 3c).

=== First exploration: Aroeira 1 and Aroeira 2 ===
The Cave of Aroeira was first investigated from 1998–2002 revealing a rich lithic assemblage with Acheulean bifaces associated with faunal remains and two human teeth: Aroeira 1 (a left mandibular canine) and Aroeira 2 (a left maxillary third molar). Aroeira 1 is moderately large and Aroeira 2 is among the larger of the Middle Pleistocene upper right third molars. They fit morphologically within the known variation of European Middle Pleistocene dentitions, although Aroeira 2 has a relatively large hypocone.

The faunal remains are highly fragmented, mainly consisting of isolated teeth, phalanges, carpal/tarsal bones, and antler fragments. Identified species include deer and equids predominantly, but also rhinoceros, bear as well as a large bovid (Bos/Bison), a caprid, and a Testudo tortoise.

=== Aroeira 3 ===
Renewed fieldwork in 2013, focused on establishing the chronology of the sequence via U-series dating of interstratified flowstone deposits, led to the discovery of a partially preserved human cranium (Aroeira 3) encased in hard breccia toward the base of the sequence. The block containing the main portion of the cranium and the detached fragments were transported to the Conservation and Restoration Laboratory at the Complutense University of Madrid for further preparation.

The cranium was restored over a period of two years. Although the taxonomic identity is debated, some authors prefer to group Aroeira 3 with other Middle Pleistocene fossils from Africa and Asia in a separate species, Homo heidelbergensis.

== Bibliography ==
- Daura, J., Sanz, M., Arsuaga, J.L.J.L., Hoffmann, D.L.D.L., Quam, R.M.R.M., Ortega, M.C.M.C., Santos, E., Gómez, S., Rubio, A., Villaescusa, L., Souto, P., Mauricio, J., Rodrigues, F., Ferreira, A., Godinho, P., Trinkaus, E., Zilhão, J., 2017c. New Middle Pleistocene hominin cranium from Gruta da Aroeira (Portugal). Proceedings of the National Academy of Sciences 114, 3397–3402. https://doi.org/10.1073/pnas.1619040114
- Daura, J., Sanz, M., Deschamps, M., Matias, H., Igreja, M., Villaescusa, L., Gómez, S., Rubio, A., Souto, P., Rodrigues, F., Zilhão, J., 2018. A 400,000-year-old Acheulean assemblage associated with the Aroeira-3 human cranium (Gruta da Aroeira, Almonda karst system, Portugal). Comptes Rendus Palevol 17, 594–615. https://doi.org/10.1016/j.crpv.2018.03.003
- Sanz, M., Sala, N., Daura, J., Pantoja-Pérez, A., Santos, E., Zilhão, J., Arsuaga, J.L., 2018. Taphonomic inferences about Middle Pleistocene hominins: The human cranium of Gruta da Aroeira (Portugal). American Journal of Physical Anthropology 167, 615–627. https://doi.org/10.1002/ajpa.23689
- Sanz, M., Daura, J., Cabanes, D., Égüez, N., Carrancho, Á., Badal, E., Souto, P., Rodrigues, F., Zilhão, J., 2020. Early evidence of fire in south-western Europe: the Acheulean site of Gruta da Aroeira (Torres Novas, Portugal). Scientific Reports 10, 12053. https://doi.org/10.1038/s41598-020-68839-w
