= Torres Novas =

- Municipality
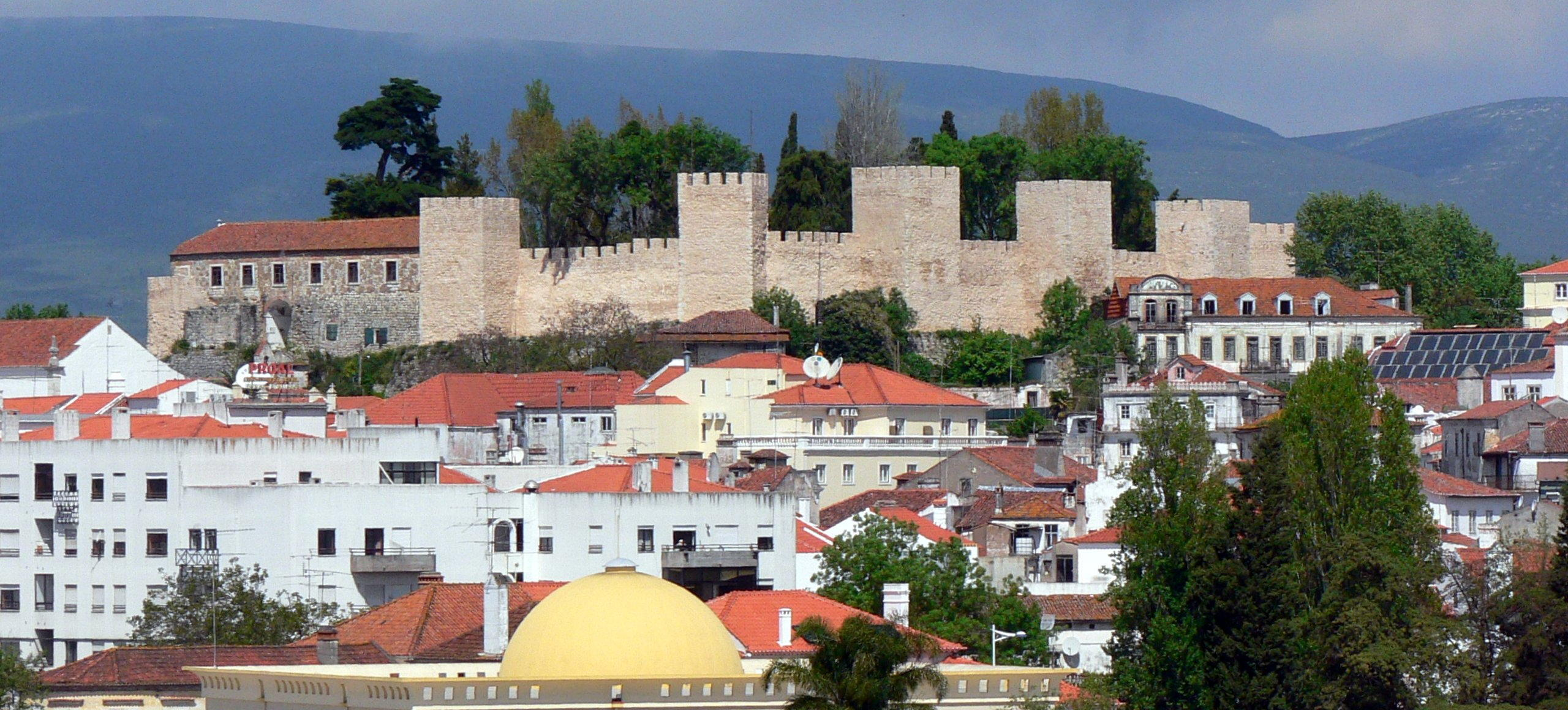
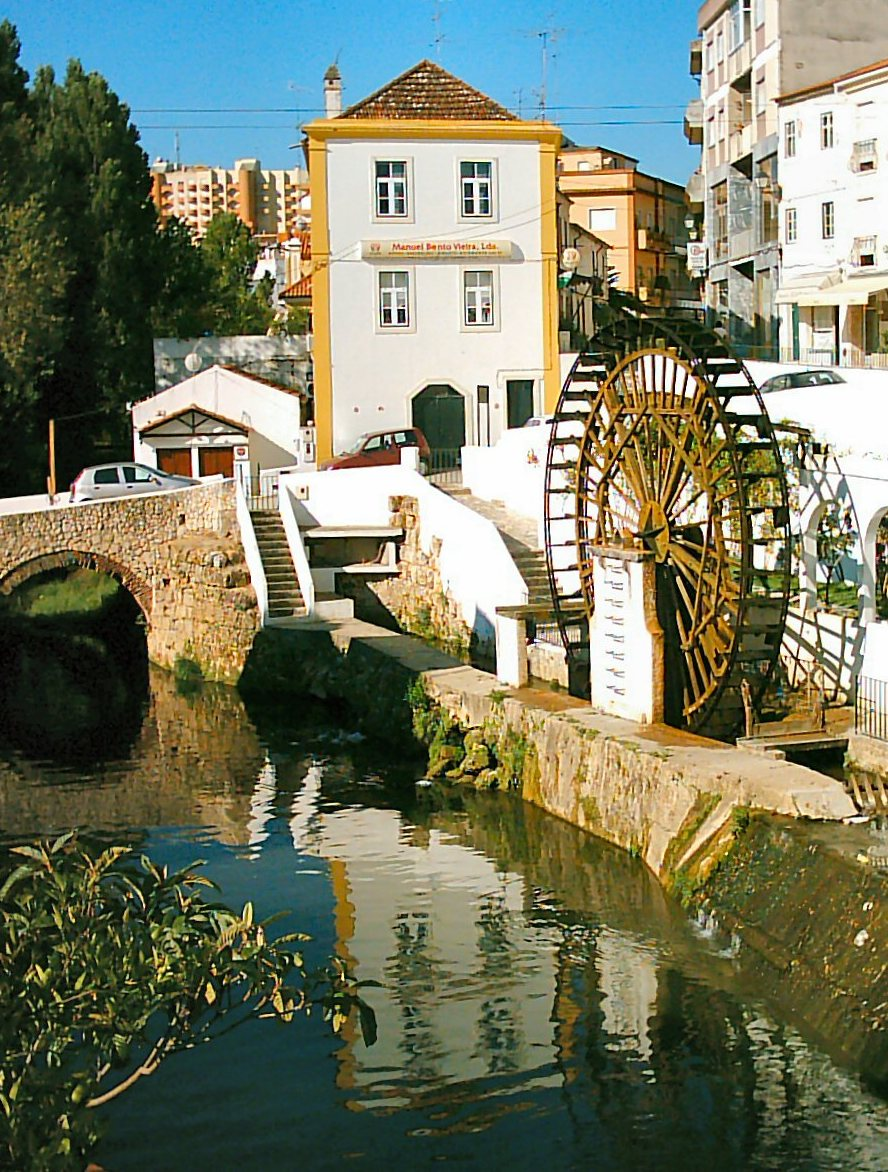
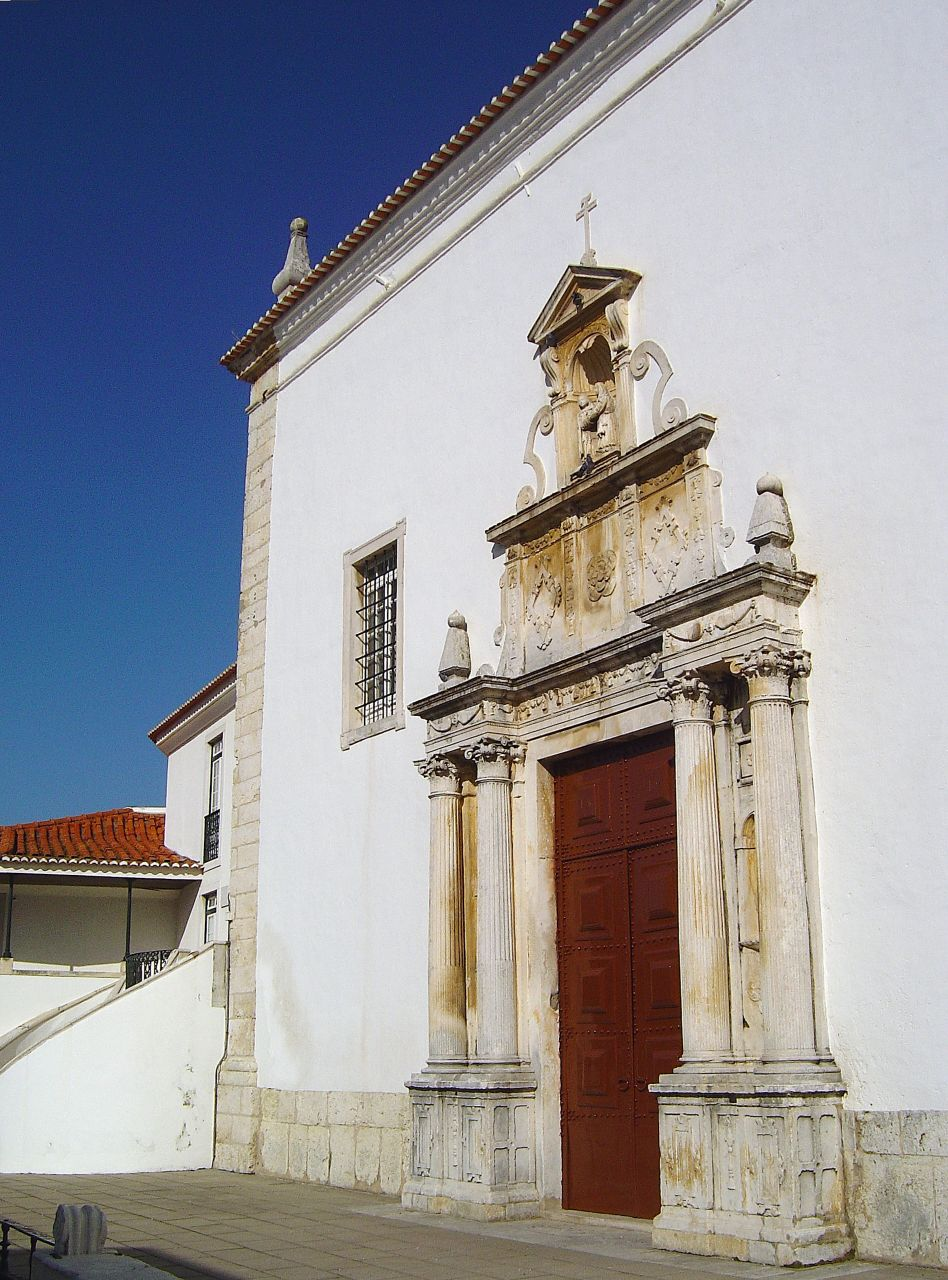
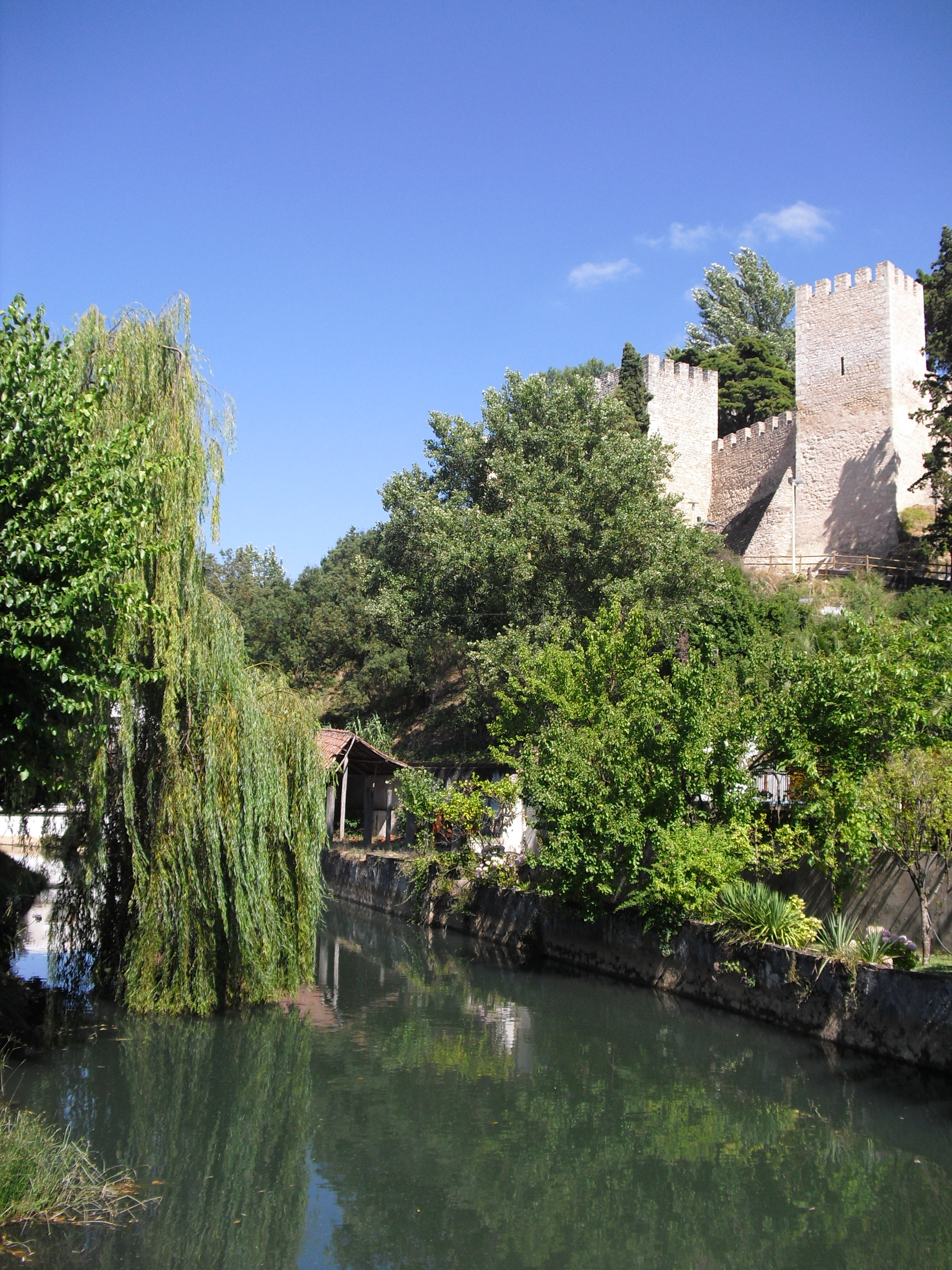
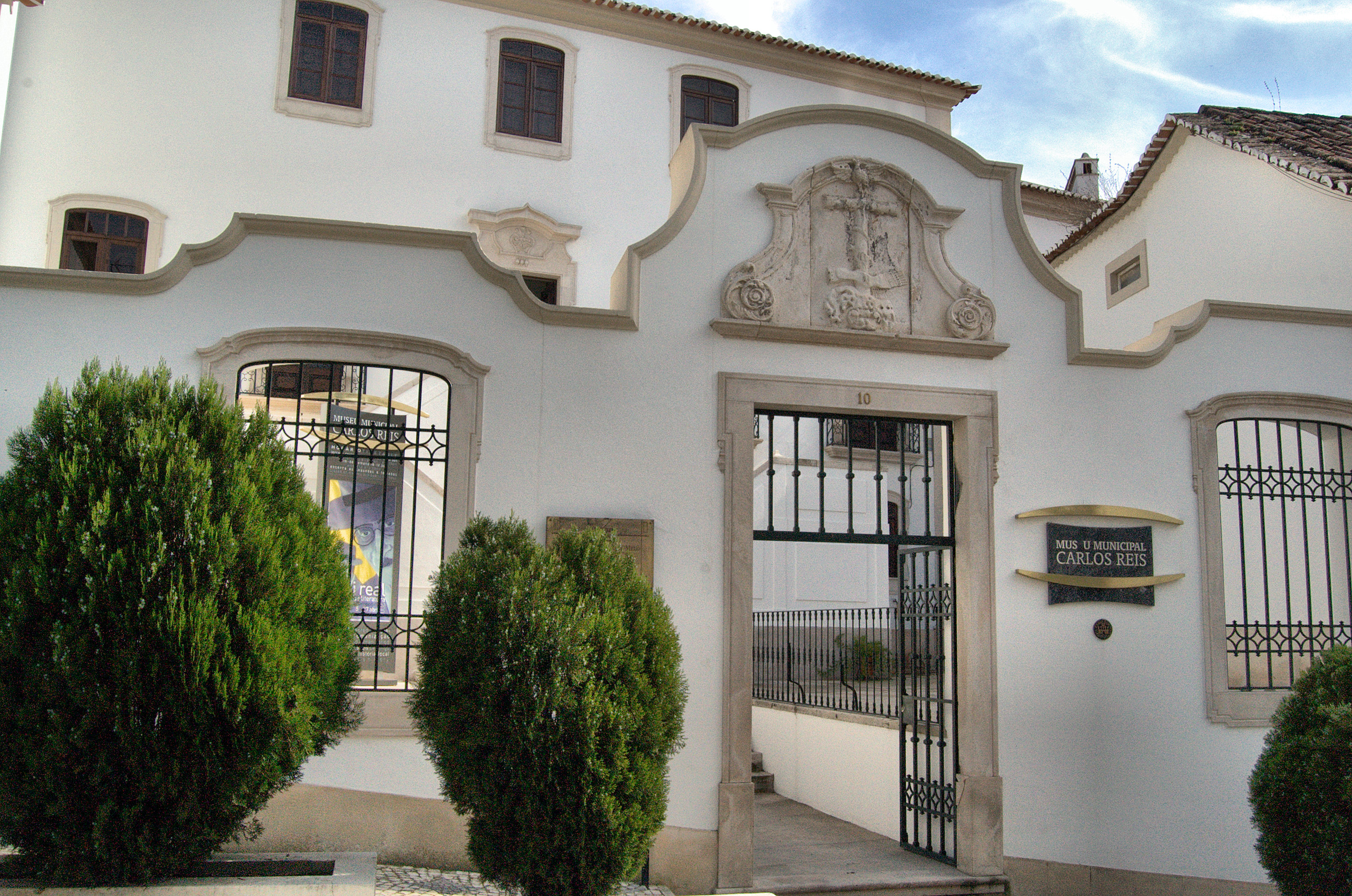
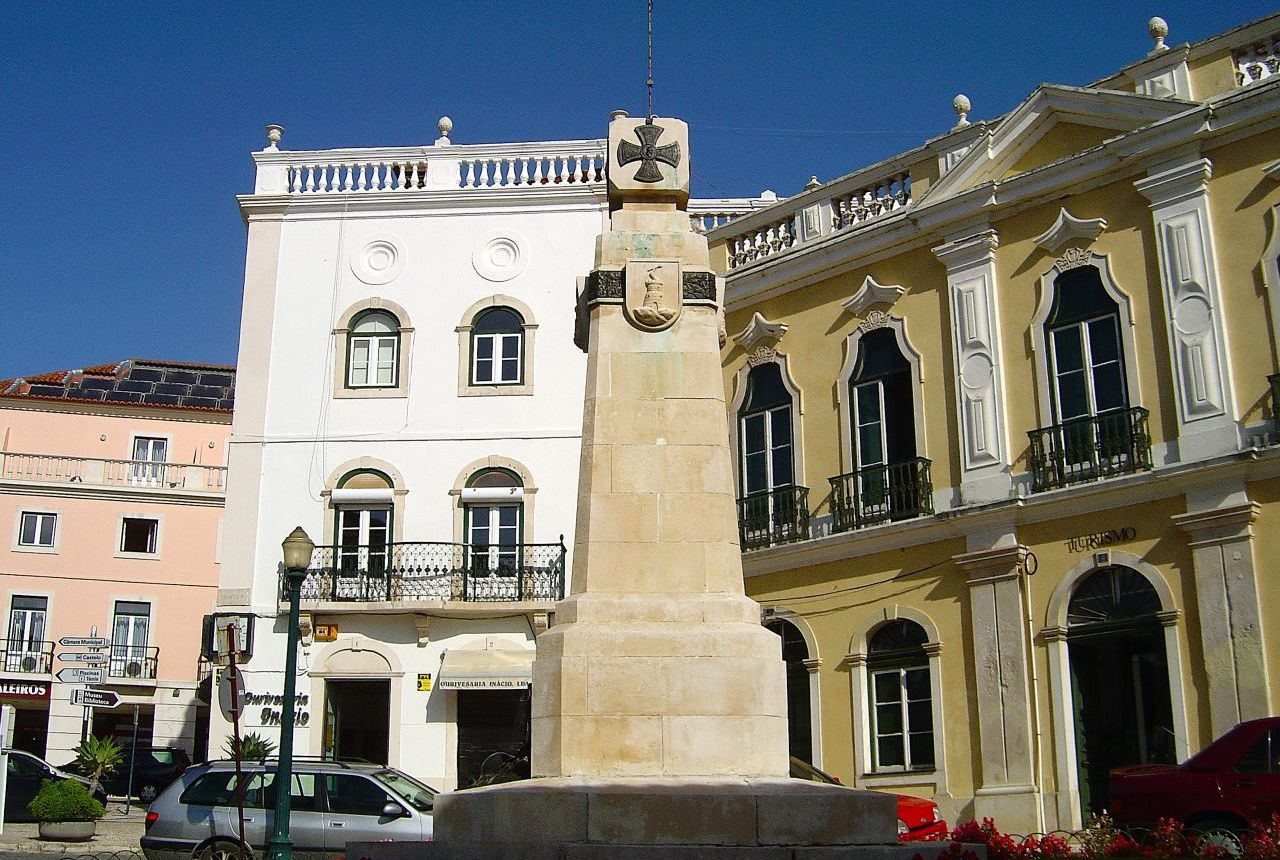

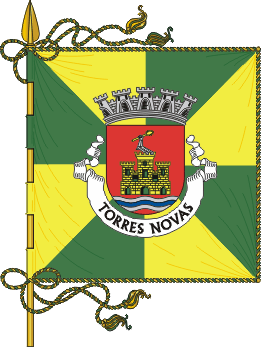
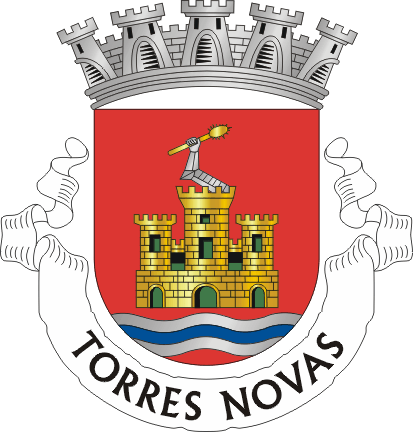
- Flag Coat of arms
- Interactive map of Torres Novas
- Coordinates: 39°28′N 8°32′W
- Country: Portugal
- Region: Oeste e Vale do Tejo
- Intermunic. comm.: Médio Tejo
- District: Santarém
- Parishes: 17

Government
  - President: Pedro Ferreira (PS)

Area
  - Total: 270.00 km^{2} (104.25 sq mi)

Population (2011)
  - Total: 36,717
  - Density: 135.99/km^{2} (352.21/sq mi)
- Time zone: UTC+00:00 (WET)
  - Summer (DST): UTC+01:00 (WEST)
- Local holiday: Ascension Day
- Website: http://www.cm-torresnovas.pt

Torres Novas (Portuguese pronunciation: [ˈtoʁɨʒ ˈnɔvɐʃ]) is a Portuguese municipality in the district of Santarém, in the Médio Tejo of the Oeste e Vale do Tejo region. The population of the municipality was approximately 36,717 (from the 2011 census), in an area that encompasses 270 square kilometres (100 mi^{2}). The city of Torres Novas proper (seat of the municipality) has about 15,000 inhabitants in an area located within the municipality.

== History ==
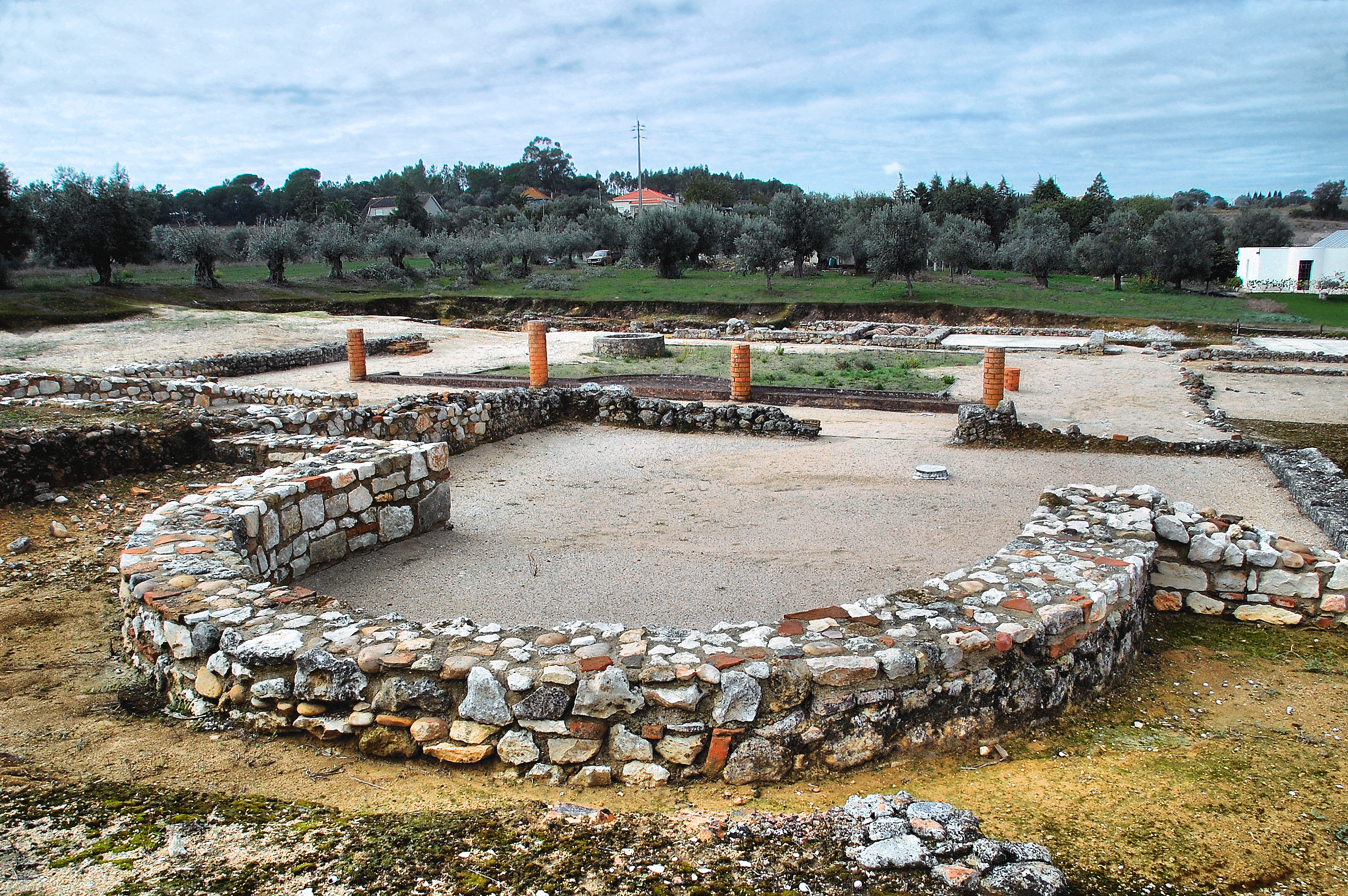
The ruins of the Roman villa of Cardílio

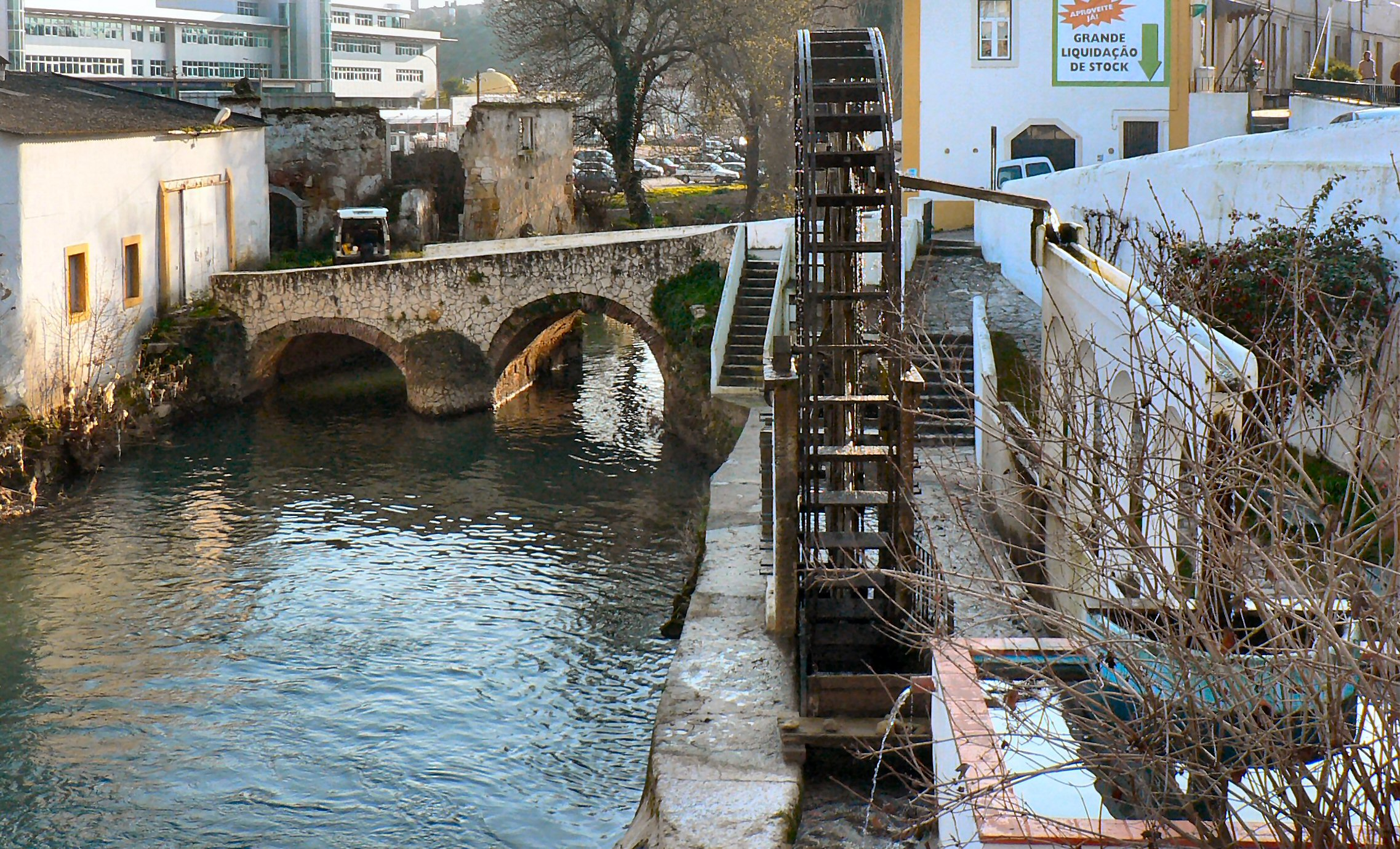
The Roman bridge and water wheel over the River Almonda

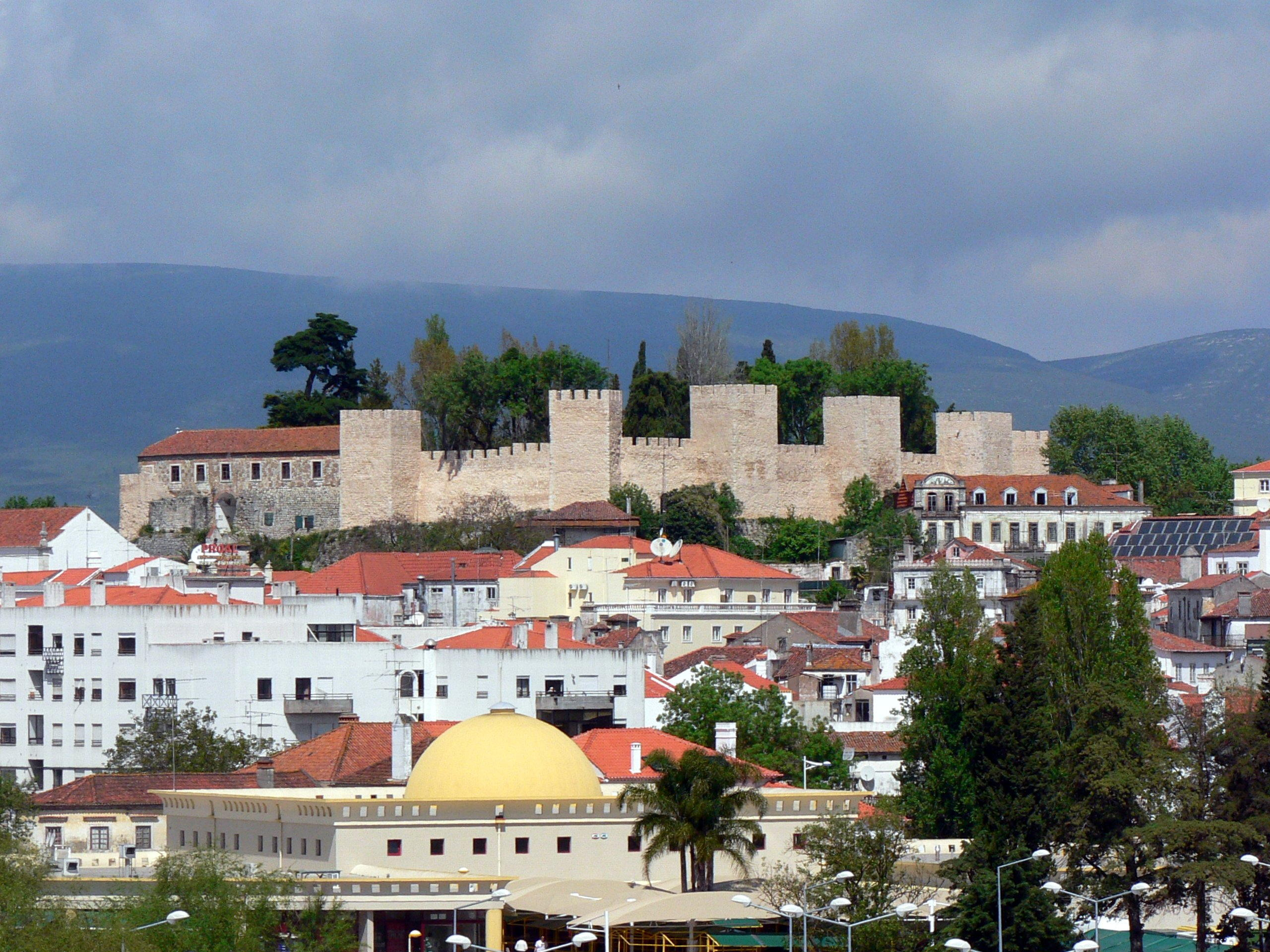
A view of the historic castle of Torres Novas

=== Pre-Monarchy ===
The earliest sign of human life in the Portuguese territory is the 400,000 year old skull discovered at the Cave of Aroeira in 2017.

The territory of Torres Novas was settled as early as the Paelothic in areas situated along the margins of the karstic network of the River Almonda, such as the grottos in Buraca da Moura, Buraca da Oliveira and Lapa da Bugalheira.

During the primordial period before Roman occupation, there were various villae that were populated in the region. Vila Cardílio, a Luso-Roman settlement was occupied in the first or second century A.D. In it, archaeologists discovered coloured mosaics, coins, sculptures and Latin inscriptions, where one was inscribed with felicitous remarks to the villa da torre (town of the tower), an expression associated with the plausible origin for the toponymy Torres Novas. Remains of Roman roads can be found north and south of Torres Novas, the latter is thought to be a part of the Olisipo-Bracara Augusta via.

=== Monarchy ===
During the 12th century, the territory that was known as Turris began to develop into its actual limits, with the expulsion of the ruling Muslims by forces loyal to Afonso I of Portugal in 1148. The foundation of the municipality was attributed to the foral issued on 1 October 1190, by King Sancho.

While the first origins of the castle are currently unknown, it is known that Sancho I had ordered the construction of a fortification that was later destroyed during wars with Castille. Later, King Fernando would reconstruct the castle with the same aim as his predecessor. The most important features of the Castle date from this latter intervention.

During the Middle Ages, the territory grew demographically and economically, receiving a Carta de Feira (authorizing a fair for this market) in 1263.

The lands of Torres Novas passed into the possessions of Queen Isabel of Aragon in 1304 (who was transferred into her title by King Denis). In the following years, Torres Novas was a meeting point for sessions of the Cortes, and historical points in the kingdoms history, like the wedding between Infanta Beatriz and Infante Henrique, children of King Fernando I and King João I of Castilo (in 1380); the establishment of regency of Queen Leonor of Aragon Aragon (due to the death of King Edward I), during the reign of Afonso V (1438); and the decisions of the Cortes, which gathered intermittently in Torres Novas, to manage the Kingdom's issues (1525).

Isabel of Avis was the donatário at the first half of the 15th century, receiving a new foral, during the reign of Manuel I of Portugal (1510).

In the following decade, John of Lancaster was given the title of the first Marquis of Torres Novas, along with the Duke of Aveiro (which were both extinguished in 1759, following the attempted regicide of Joseph I, associated with José Mascarenhas da Silva e Lencastre). The monarch survived the attempted assassination.

In 1755, the Lisbon earthquake reached Torres Novas and destroyed four of the Castle's towers.

The king's daughter later conceded a license to Henrique Meuron and David Suabe to install Fábrica das Chitas (1783), which was later destroyed by General Masséna, during the third French campaign along the Iberian peninsula (1810).

The economy within Torres Novas continued along the 19th century, with some successes and failures: the founding of the Fábrica de Papel do Almonda (1818); establishment of the Companhia de Fiação de Torres Novas (1845); the creation of the transporter João Clara & Companhia (Irmãos) Lda. which, at the time of its nationalization (1975), was dominated by Clara Transportes - S.A.R.L.. In 1835, Queen Maria I of Portugal would donate the Castle to Torres Nova's municipality, which would decide to demolish parts of the structure.

The inauguration of the rail link between Torres Novas and Alcanena occurred in 1893, and was one of the most curious episode in the business and troubled history of the area. It was shut down only three years after its inauguration, due to multiple derailments earned it the nickname "Blind rat".

In 1910, before the 5 October 1910 revolution, the Torres Novas castle received the status of National Monument.

=== Post-Monarchy ===
Between 1940 and 1960 the Direção-Geral dos Edifícios e Monumentos Nacionais would order the reconstruction of part of the castle walls, including the towers.

In 1985, Torres Novas was elevated to the status of city.

On 1 January 1986, Portugal would join the European Economic Community, which would see to the construction of highway A23 leading to Spain. This development benefited Torres Novas, giving it a logistical advantage and pushing the development of business and shops between the Torres Novas city center and the A23 entry.

== Geography ==
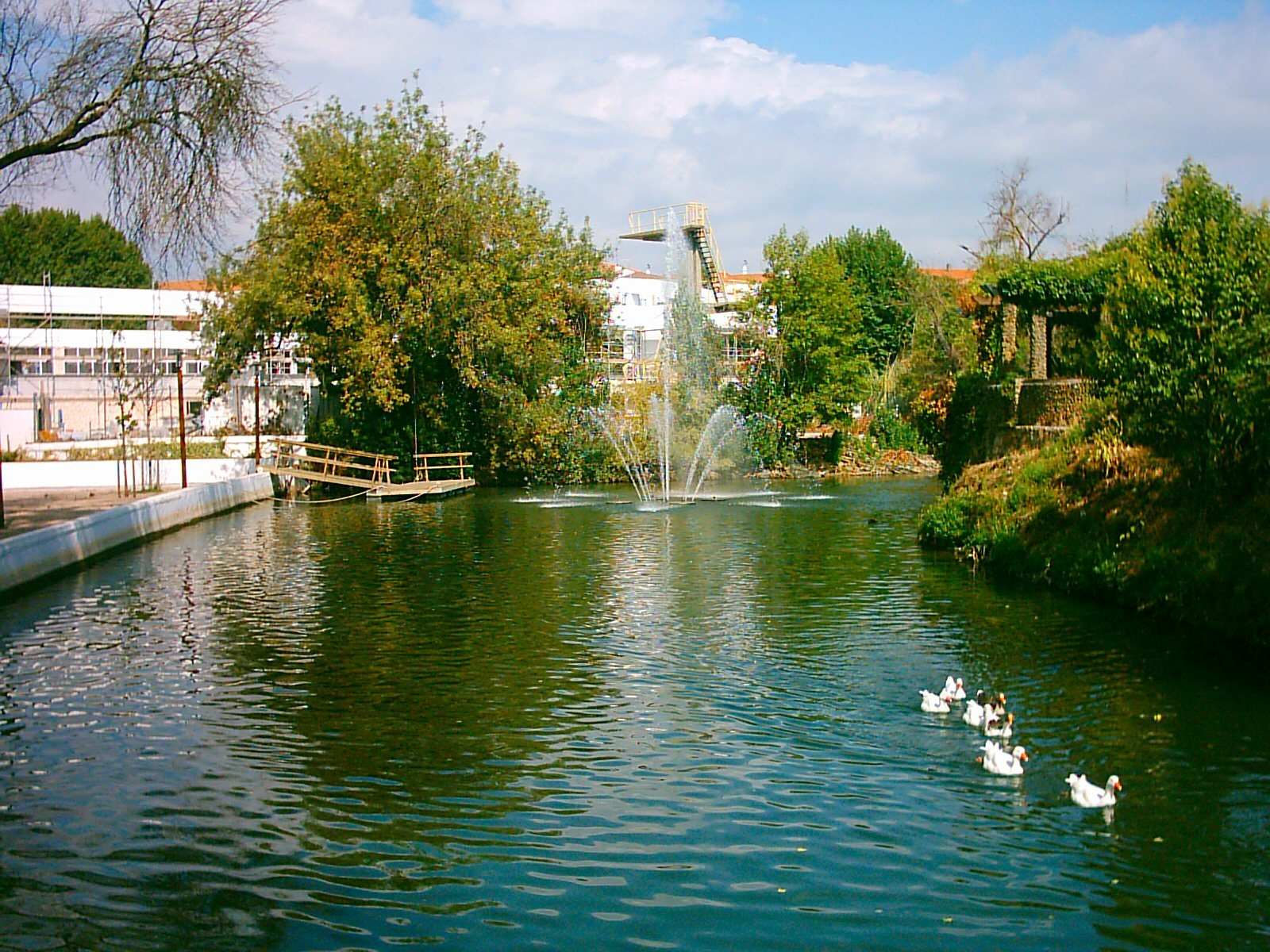
A section of the River Almonda that integrates into the municipality

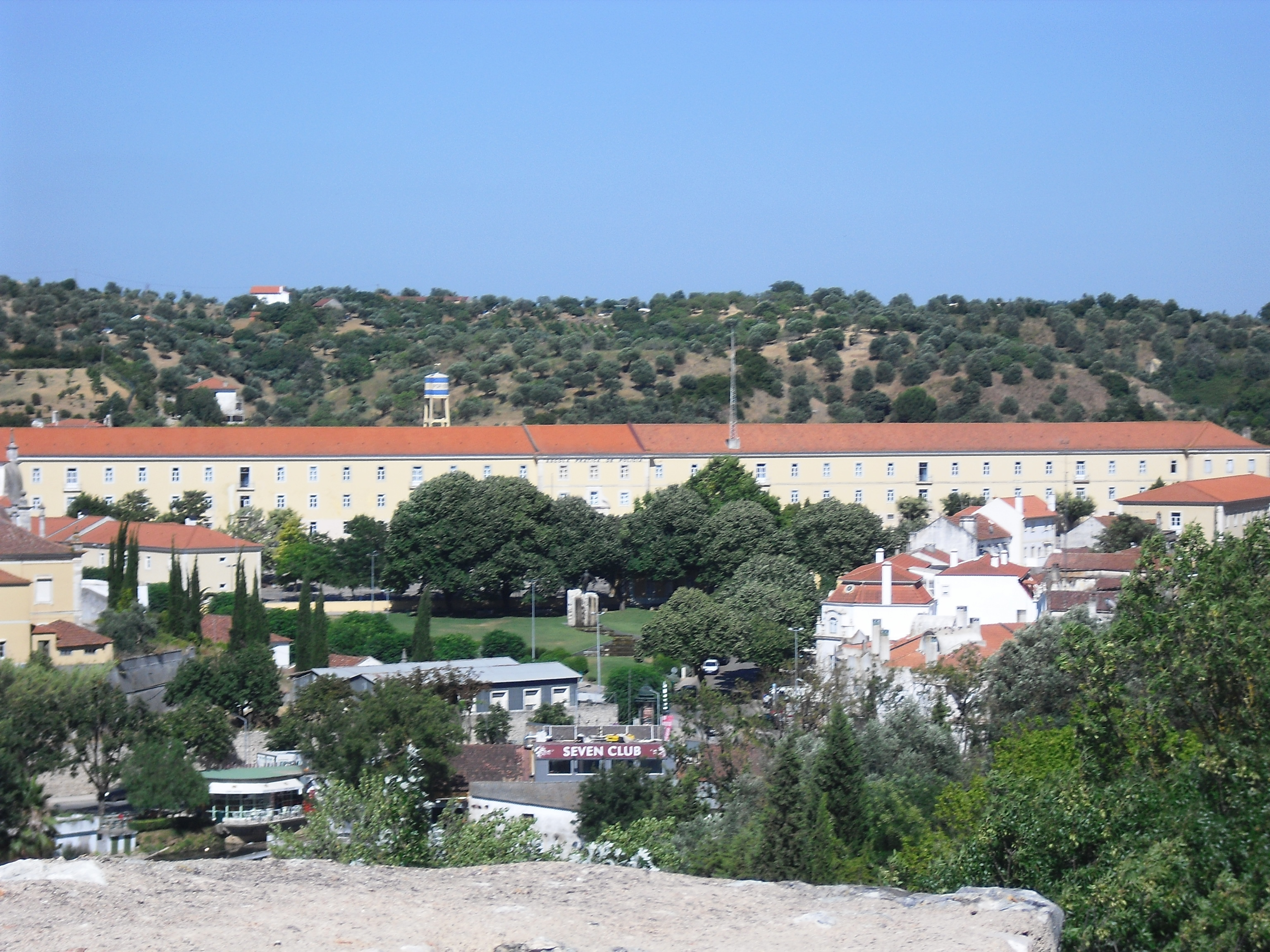
A view of the Police Practical School in Torres Novas (Santa Maria, Salvador e Santiago)

=== Physical geography ===
The municipality of Torres Novas is situated in the Médio Tejo subregion. It has close regional relationships with Tomar, Abrantes, Entroncamento, Vila Nova da Barquinha, Alcanena and Ourém. The castle and old town developed partially encircled by the Almonda river, which constituted a natural line of defense. The soil is mostly characterized by alluviums and limestone.

=== Climate ===
Torres Novas experiences a microclimate characterized by low temperature and humidity during the winter and dry air/higher temperatures during the summer due to its proximity with the mountain ranges of Aire and Candeeiros. Its annual rainfall tends to be between 600 and 800mm and experiences 2400–2700 hours of direct sunlight exposure per year.

=== Civil Parishes ===
Administratively, The city of Torres Novas is the seat of the municipality, that is divided into 10 civil parishes civil parishes:

- Assentiz
- Brogueira, Parceiros de Igreja e Alcorochel
- Chancelaria
- Meia Via
- Olaia e Paço
- Pedrógão
- Riachos
- Torres Novas (São Pedro), Lapas e Ribeira Branca
- Torres Novas (Santa Maria, Salvador e Santiago)
- Zibreira

Four of the parishes were included in the city of Torres Novas. The union of Torres Novas (São Pedro), Lapas e Ribeira Branca concentrates the majority of the people of the municipality (over 8400 inhabitants), in contrast with the parish of Zibreira (with approximately 1000 people). The largest parish, with an area of 40 square kilometres (15 mi^{2}), is the Torres Novas (Santa Maria, Salvador e Santiago), and the smallest is the parish of Meia Via, 4 square kilometres (1.5 mi^{2}). The small size means that it is the largest by density, with 395 inhabitants per kilometre square, and eight times the density of the smallest, Chancelaria.

== Demographics ==
According to the 2011 census, Torres Novas had a populational density of 136 people/km^{2} in 2011, above the national average of 114.5 people/km^{2}, an aging index (ratio of people ≥65 to people ≤14) of 173.0, also above the national average of 127.8, and a sex ratio of 91.2, slightly below the national average of 91.5.

Year	1864	1890	1911	2009	2010	2011	2012	2013	2014	2015	2016	2017	2018	2019
Average resident population	23282	30041	41432	36876	36825	36701	36464	36926	35897	35663	35504	35314	35089	34952
Note: 21st century data from, older from.

== Archeology ==
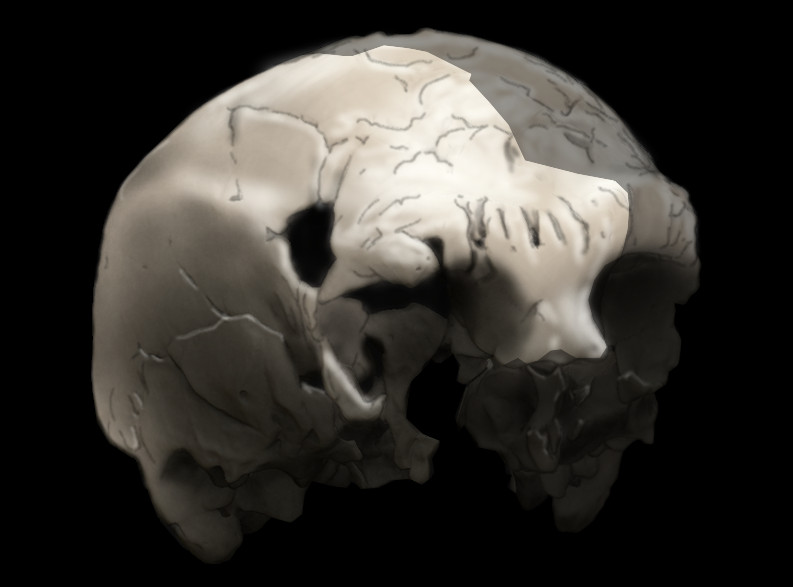
Aroeira 3 skull of 400,000 year old Homo Heidelbergensis The oldest trace of human history in Portugal

The village of Almonda within the parish of Zibreira is noted for the Aroeira cave where the 400,000 years old Aroeira 3 skull of Homo Heidelbergensis was discovered in 2014 - the oldest trace of human history in Portugal.

== International Relations ==
=== Twin towns — Sister cities ===
Torres Novas is twinned with:

- Ribeira Grande, Cape Verde, since 1997
- Moreni, Romania
- Rambouillet, France, since 2010
- Manatuto, East Timor, since 2002

== Politics ==
The present president of the municipality is Pedro Ferreira, elected by the Socialist Party.

=== City hall ===
City hall election results 1976 to 2017, based on CNE data
Data	%	V	%	V	%	V	%	V	%	V	%	V	%	V	%	V	Turnout
Data	PS		PPD/PSD		CDU		FEPU		APU		AD		BE		Others		Turnout
1976	37.55	3	28.66	2	FEPU		23.09	2							5.36	0	61.0%
1979	26.93	2	AD		APU				23.76	2	42.24	3			3.92	0	68.6%
1982	30.25	2	AD		APU				23.05	2	40.38	3			1.87	0	65.5%
1985	23.26	2	36.53	3	APU				19.47	2					16.80	0	60.0%
1989	34.78	3	36.61	3	15.40	1									8.13	0	60.2%
1993	39.53	3	39.15	3	13.50	1									2.67	0	65.2%
1997	49.26	4	28.16	2	13.18	1									4.35	0	63.8%
2001	47.58	4	24.54	2	17.02	1							2.90	0	3.29	0	62.2%
2005	52.72	5	20.86	1	15.20	1							4.47	0	1.60	0	62.9%
2009	53.80	5	20.90	1	13.00	1							5.85	0	3.26	0	59.0%
2013	48.99	4	18.81	1	17.56	1							10.87	1	3.77	0	52.5%
2017	51.56	5	15.74	1	9.83	0							15.30	1	4.57	0	54.7%

== Economy ==
Renova – Fábrica de Papel do Almonda, SA, a well known paper company, is based in the municipality, as well as the Companhia de Torres Novas, a textiles company founded in 1845.

== Culture ==
The municipal holiday is Ascension Day.

There are Municipal Museum Carlos Reis, Agricultural Museum of Riachos and Humberto Delgado Memorial House in the municipality.

== Notable citizens ==
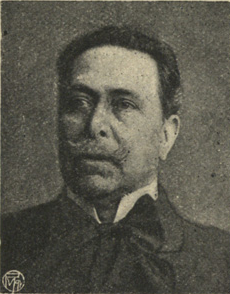
Sebastião Baracho contributed to Portugal's first republican constitution

- Sebastião de Sousa Dantas Baracho, (Wiki PT) (1844-1921) military man and politician during the end of the Portuguese Monarchy and part of the Constituent Assembly during the First Portuguese Republic.
- Carlos António Rodrigues dos Reis, (Wiki PT) (1863-1940) naturalistic painter.
- Maria Lamas (1893-1983) writer, translator, journalist, and feminist political activist.
- Manuel António Vassalo e Silva (1899-1985) officer of the Portuguese Army and an overseas administrator. He was the 128th and last Governor-General of Portuguese India.
- Humberto Delgado (1906-1965) General of the Portuguese Air Force, diplomat and politician.
- Maria Lúcia Vassalo Namorado (1909-2000) writer, poet, journalist, teacher and social reformer, and director of the magazine Os nossos filhos (Our Children).
- Carlos Cruz (born 1942) radio and TV journalist and talk-show host involved in the Casa Pia scandal.
- José Luís Borga (1964) Roman Catholic priest and Christian contemporary musician.

=== Sport ===
- José Torres (1938 - 2010) football centre forward and coach with 374 club caps and 33 for Portugal
- Jim Aldred (born 1963), Canadian expatriate and coach of the Portugal men's national ice hockey team
- Luís Fernando Quintas dos Santos (born 1965) known as Quintas, a former footballer with over 320 club caps.
- Jorge Casquilha (born 1969) a former footballer with 458 club caps
- Pedro Miguel Marques da Costa Filipe (born 1980) known as Pepa, a former footballer and current manager of Vitória S.C.
