= Renova (company) =

Portuguese paper company

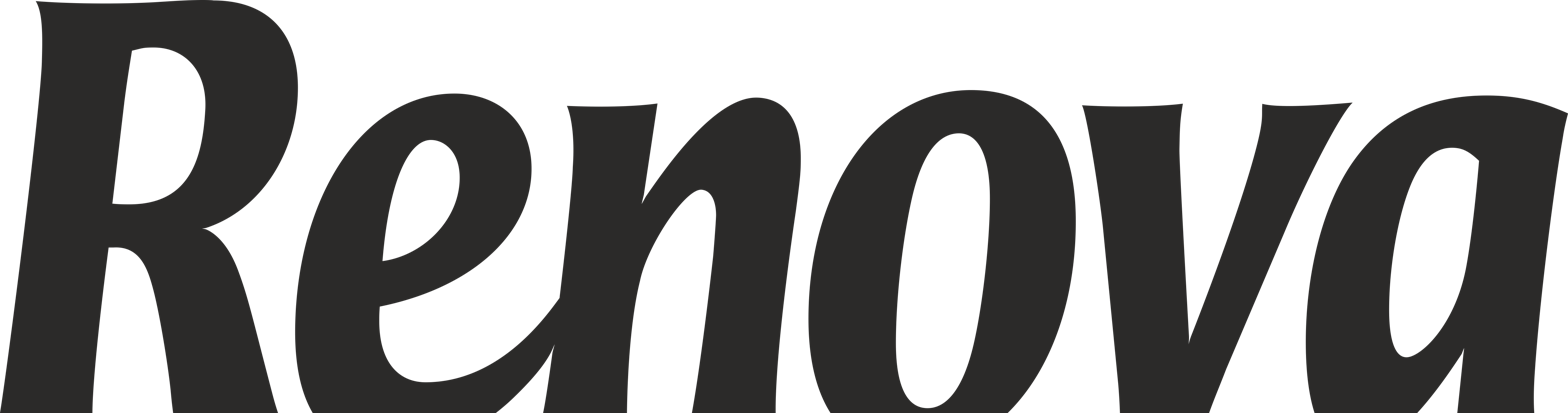
Renova logo

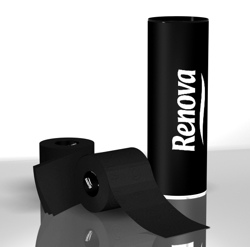
Renova's toilet paper

Renova (full name: Renova - Fábrica de Papel do Almonda, SA) is a Portuguese company that produces paper consumption goods (such as tissues and toilet paper). It is based in the city of Torres Novas, located in Médio Tejo, a NUTS3 subregion belonging to Centro region. It is one of the most well-known industry brands inside and outside of the country. Their products are sold and advertised in countries like Japan, France, the UK, the United States, Belgium, and Spain.

== Products ==
Renova's main products are tissues for domestic and sanitary use such as toilet paper, kitchen rolls, napkins, handkerchiefs, facials. Renova is also present in feminine hygiene products, wet wipes, and printing & writing paper. A major success in recent years is the unique Renova Black Toilet Tissue.

== Brand ==
It became known to a wider public (outside of Portugal) through an advertising campaign (first launched in 2002) that made use of sex appeal to sell toilet paper - something other companies didn't dare to do before. The campaign, using photos made by the French photographer François Rousseau, received special attention of the French magazine Photo, which promoted a photographic contest inspired by it (and sponsored by the company).

- 2017 New paper mill, Renova PM07 starts operating in Torres Novas, pioneering the new NTT technology for paper making in Europe.
- 2016 New factory, Renova 3, inaugurated in France, Saint-Yorre.
- 2015 Exports to 90 world countries are now becoming regular.
- 2014 Renova starts its operations in Mexico under the brand novaRe.
- 2013 Renova starts its operations in Canada.
- 2012 Marketing Case Study of Portugal’s Renova Black Toilet Paper is #1 in global case study award
- 2011 Renova Mills no1 and no2 receive more than 6.000 students a year, from all ages.
- 2010 Renova, a business case study at INSEAD: "Renova Toilet Paper: Escaping the Commoditization Trap"
- 2009 New large scale automatic warehousing facilities and many new automated converting lines. New natural gas electrical co-generation central.
- 2007 New business unit to explore the brand presence in markets not previously explored, with a global scope.
- 2006 For the first time, a Renova product is reviewed by major national newspapers and fashion magazines across the globe.
- 2005 After launching Renova Black, the first black toilet paper ever, new trade channels across the globe become interested in the product.
- 2004 Renova Belgium starts its operations in Belgium and Luxembourg.
- 2003 Renova launches its first moist toilet paper product lines.
- 2002 Renova France starts operations in France, using its innovative “Fresh&Clean” toilet paper as main market driver.
- 1999 Renova acquires the water company Promineral SA.
- 1999 ISO 14001 certification, for environmental compliance, is granted to Renova SA, which becomes the first company with such certification in Spain and Portugal.
- 1998 Launch of the first toilet paper in the world integrating micro-droplets of smoothing cream (“Renova Fresh&Clean”).
- 1995 Major branding reform takes place, with all products starting to carry the brand name “Renova”.
- 1990 Renova España SA begins its operations in Spain.
- 1989 The first modern cross-category line of products is launched (“Renova Class”).
- 1979 Mill number 2 is inaugurated.
- 1970 First feminine hygiene line of products is launched (“Reglex”).
- 1961 The modification of the business structure is completed: from office paper to disposable household and body paper products.
- 1958 The company launches “Renova Super”, the best selling product of the company ever.
- 1950 Acquisition of a dedicated high voltage power line complementing the main energy source of the factory: the river.
- 1943 A new group of stockholders takes hold of the company. Renova – Fábrica de Papel do Almonda, SA is born.
- 1939 Foundation of the private company Fábrica de Papel do Almonda Lda.
- 1818 David Ardisson chose the Renova brand as the watermark for the first sheet of paper manufactured on the banks of Almonda river, Torres Novas
