= Arripiado =

Coordinates: 39°27′N 8°24′W

Arripiado is a village in the Parish of Carregueira in the northern county of Chamusca near the southern bank of the River Tagus in Portugal. It is in this town that the wetland of Ribatejana begins. Being built on a slope, the constructions of stops in the village range from the 118 National Highway to the waterfront.
