= Santarém District =

District of Portugal

Coordinates: 39°14′N 8°41′W

District of Santarém Distrito de Santarém (Portuguese)
- District
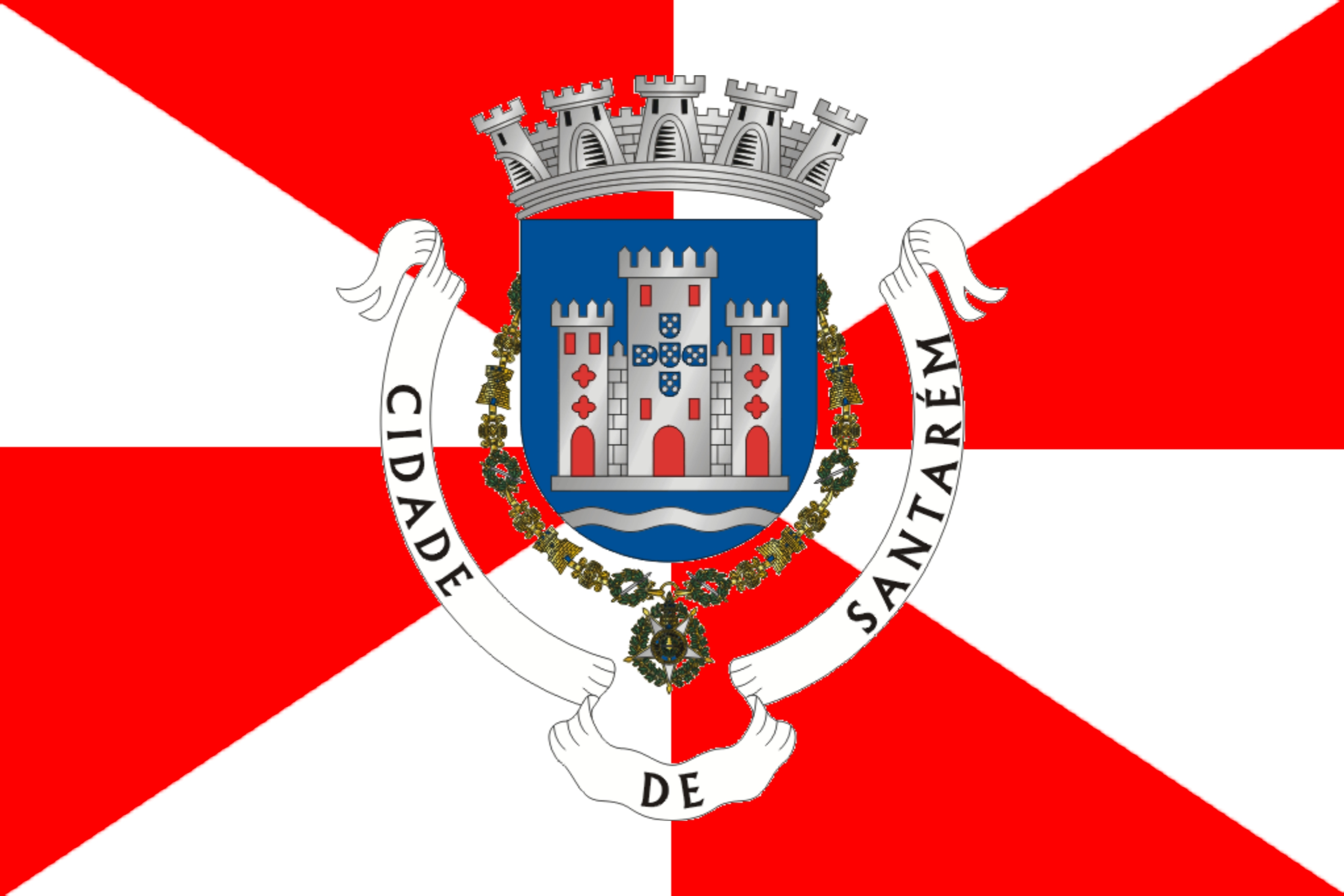
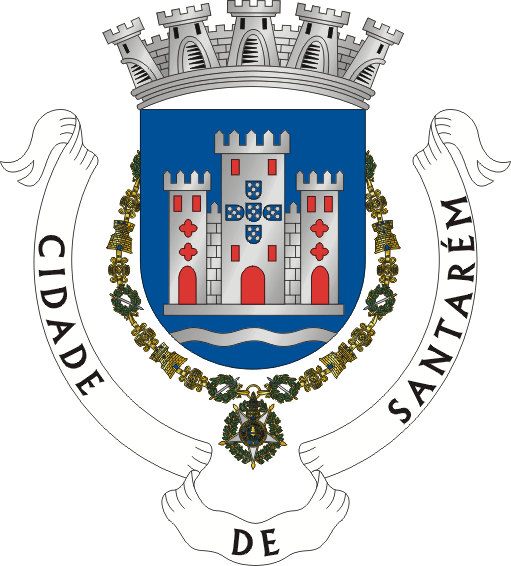
- Flag Coat of arms

- Country: Portugal
- Region: Oeste e Vale do Tejo
- Historical province: Ribatejo (partly Beira Baixa and Beira Litoral)
- No. of municipalities: 21
- No. of parishes: 150
- Capital: Santarém

Area
  - Total: 6,747 km^{2} (2,605 sq mi)

Population
  - Total: 475,344
  - Density: 70.45/km^{2} (182.5/sq mi)
- ISO 3166 code: PT-14
- No. of parliamentary representatives: 9

The District of Santarém (Portuguese: Distrito de Santarém [sɐ̃tɐˈɾɐ̃j]) is a district of Portugal, located in Portugal's West and Tagus Valley region. The district capital is the city of Santarém.

The district is the 3rd largest in Portugal, with an area of 6,747 km^{2} (2,605 sq mi), and a population of 475,344 inhabitants, giving it a population density of 70 people per sq. kilometer (180 people per sq. mile).

== Municipalities ==
The district includes the following 21 municipalities.

- Abrantes
- Alcanena
- Almeirim
- Alpiarça
- Benavente
- Cartaxo
- Chamusca
- Constância
- Coruche
- Entroncamento
- Ferreira do Zêzere
- Golegã
- Mação
- Ourém
- Rio Maior
- Salvaterra de Magos
- Santarém
- Sardoal
- Tomar
- Torres Novas
- Vila Nova da Barquinha

== Summary of votes and seats won 1976–2022 ==
Summary of election results from Santarém district, 1976–2022
Parties	%	S	%	S	%	S	%	S	%	S	%	S	%	S	%	S	%	S	%	S	%	S	%	S	%	S	%	S	%	S	%	S
Parties	1976		1979		1980		1983		1985		1987		1991		1995		1999		2002		2005		2009		2011		2015		2019		2022	
PS	38.4	6	27.3	3	30.4	4	38.4	5	18.6	2	21.7	3	29.4	3	45.8	5	45.5	5	38.4	4	46.1	6	33.7	4	25.9	3	32.9	3	37.1	4	41.2	5
PSD	19.5	3	In AD				24.7	3	27.8	4	47.9	7	49.1	6	31.0	3	30.2	3	38.1	4	26.4	3	27.0	3	37.6	5	In PàF		25.2	3	26.9	3
CDS-PP	13.9	2	In AD				10.0	1	7.7	1	3.6		3.3		8.7	1	8.1	1	8.4	1	6.9		11.2	1	12.3	1	In PàF		4.7		1.9	
PCP/APU/CDU	16.1	2	21.7	3	19.0	2	20.0	3	16.4	2	12.6	1	9.8	1	9.5	1	10.1	1	8.6	1	8.6	1	9.2	1	9.0	1	9.6	1	7.6	1	5.4	
AD			41.0	6	42.1	6																										
PRD									23.8	3	7.3	1	1.0																			
BE																	2.0		2.8		6.5		11.8	1	5.8		10.8	1	10.2	1	4.6	
PàF																											35.8	4				
CHEGA																													2.0		10.9	1
Total seats	13		12										10														9					
Source: Comissão Nacional de Eleições

== Archeology ==
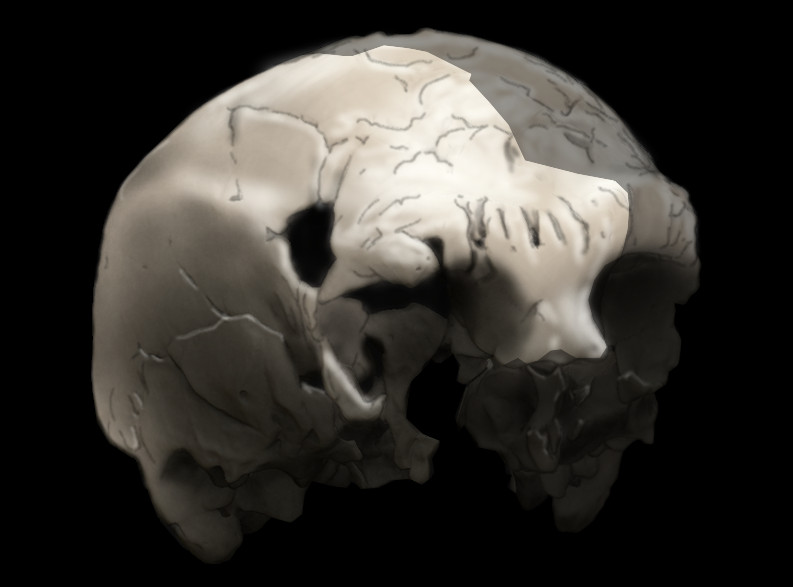
the Aroeira 3 skull of a 400,000 year old Homo Heidelbergensis, The oldest trace of human history in Portugal.

The village of Almonda, within the civil parish of Zibreira, is noted for the Aroeira cave, where the 400,000 year old Aroeira 3 skull of a Homo Heidelbergensis was discovered in 2014. It is the oldest trace of human habitation in Portugal.

== See also ==
- Arripiado, a village in the district of Santarém
- 1909 Benavente earthquake, a deadly seismic event centered in the district
