= Aroeira 3 =

Hominin fossil

Coordinates: 39.5057°N 8.6157°W

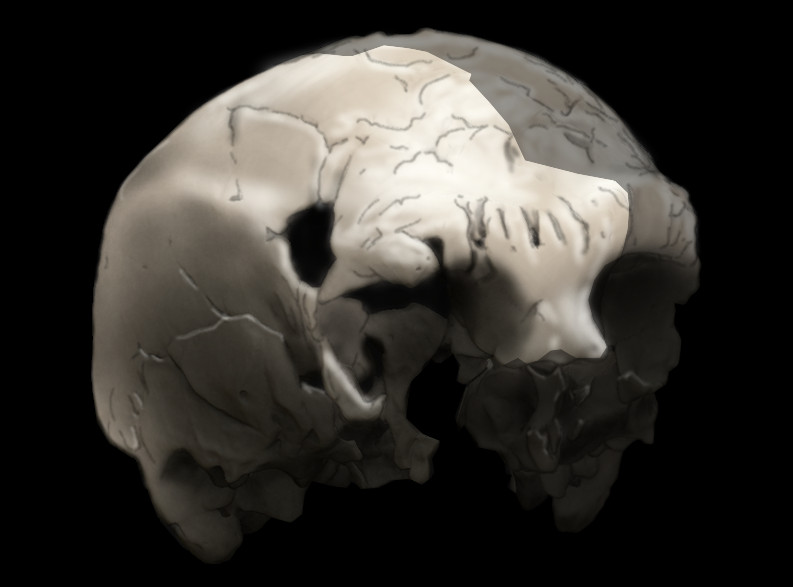
- Common name: Aroeira 3
- Species: Homo heidelbergensis
- Age: c. 400,000 years
- Place discovered: Pedrógão Grande, Leiria, Portugal
- Date discovered: 2014

Aroeira 3 is a 400,000 year old Homo heidelbergensis hominid skull which was discovered in the Aroeira cave, Portugal. It is the earliest human trace in Portugal. H. heidelbergensis existed at the transition between Homo erectus and early Neanderthals and used both stone tools and fire. The skull was damaged during the 2014 excavation but was restored in the following two years. In 2017, the description of the skull was published in PNAS. It is on display in the National Archaeology Museum (Lisbon).

== Description ==
Aroeira 3 is a 400,000 year old Homo heidelbergensis hominid skull from the Middle Pleistocene which was discovered in the Aroeira cave, Portugal and announced in spring 2017. It is the earliest human trace in Portugal.

Hominin fossils from this era are commonly classified as H. heidelbergensis, a chronospecies that stands at the transition between Homo erectus and early Neanderthals. The Palaeolithic Acheulean culture, attributed to this and other finds in the Cave of Aroeira, is characterised by the production of Stone tools, notably the hand axe and the use of fire. The skull was damaged during the 2014 excavation from the hard conglomerate rock, but was restored in the following two years. It was only in 2017 that the description of the skull was published in the Proceedings of the National Academy of Sciences of the United States of America (PNAS).

== Features ==
Aroeira 3 shows some of the features from similar skulls found in Europe, but their combination is unique. The over-eyelashes are continuous, as in the Bilzingsleben skull fragments of Homo erectus bilzingslebensis. The mastoid of the temporal bone is short as in Homo steinheimensis from the gravel pit at Steinheim an der Murr. The large, triangular bony tap on the temporal bone near the auditory canal is also present in skull no. 5 from the site Sima de los Huesos in Spain, the best preserved Homo heidelbergensis skull in the world. The Aroeira 3 skull, however, differs from this and the Homo steinheimensis by the absence of essential features that also occur in the early Neanderthals.

== Location ==
The skull was found in a cave above the source of the Rio Almonda, a tributary of the Tagus, which lies in the karst landscape of the Portuguese Estremadura Limestone Massif. The river forms an approximately 40-kilometer-long cut in the limestone massif with steep banks up to 70 meters in height. On these steep banks, there are various entrances to caves and cave systems that are partially collapsed or filled. Some caves have been excavated and explored. They are associated with human evolution during the Pleistocene and the cultural history during the Paleolithic. There are some cave systems used in the Upper Palaeolithic such as Entrada Superior, Entrada do Vale da Serra and Gruta da Aroeira. The Middle Palaeolithic is represented in the Gruta da Oliveira. Late Palaeolithic developments of the Solutrean and Magdalenian cultures can be found in the Galeria da Cisterna and the Lapa dos Coelhos.

Since 1978, the caves have been systematically explored, the first phase of the excavation work in the Cave of Aroeira lasted from 1998 until 2002. In addition to two early human teeth from the Acheulian industry (a canine and a molar, known as Aroeira 1 and Aroeira 2) were also found. The second phase of excavation, from 2013 to 2015, included the well-preserved skull Aroeira 3, but the hardness of the sediment in which it was embedded lead to damage during recovery and had it to be partially reconstructed.

== Age ==
The age was assessed by uranium–thorium dating, whereby the age of the outer layer of the adjacent stalagmite was found to be 406,000 years within a range of 30,000 years. This is the upper limit because the stalagmite was later buried by boulders and mud masses and stopped growing. Calcite crusts on the skull itself were dated to 390,000 years (± 14,000 years).

== See also ==
- List of human evolution fossils
