= Nisa Municipal Chamber =

Legislative body of Nisa, Portugal

Coordinates: 39.51845°N 7.64884°W

Nisa Municipal Chamber Câmara Municipal de Nisa
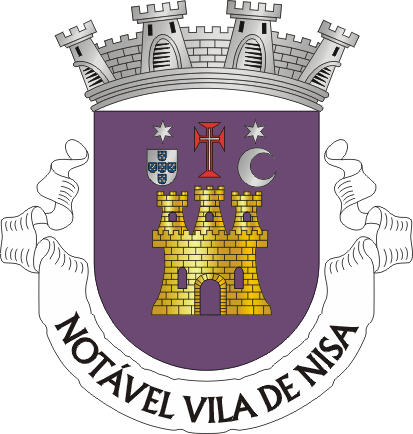
- Coat of arms of the town of Nisa

Type
- Type: Câmara municipal
- Term limits: 3

History
- Founded: Between 1229 and 1232

Leadership
- President: Maria Idalina Alves Trindade, PS since 20 October 2021
- Vice President: José Dinis Samarra Serra, PS since 20 October 2021

Structure
- Seats: 5
- Political groups: Municipal Executive (3) PS (3) Opposition (2) PSD (1) CDU (1)
- Length of term: Four years

Elections
- Last election: 26 September 2021
- Next election: Sometime between 22 September and 14 October 2025

Meeting place
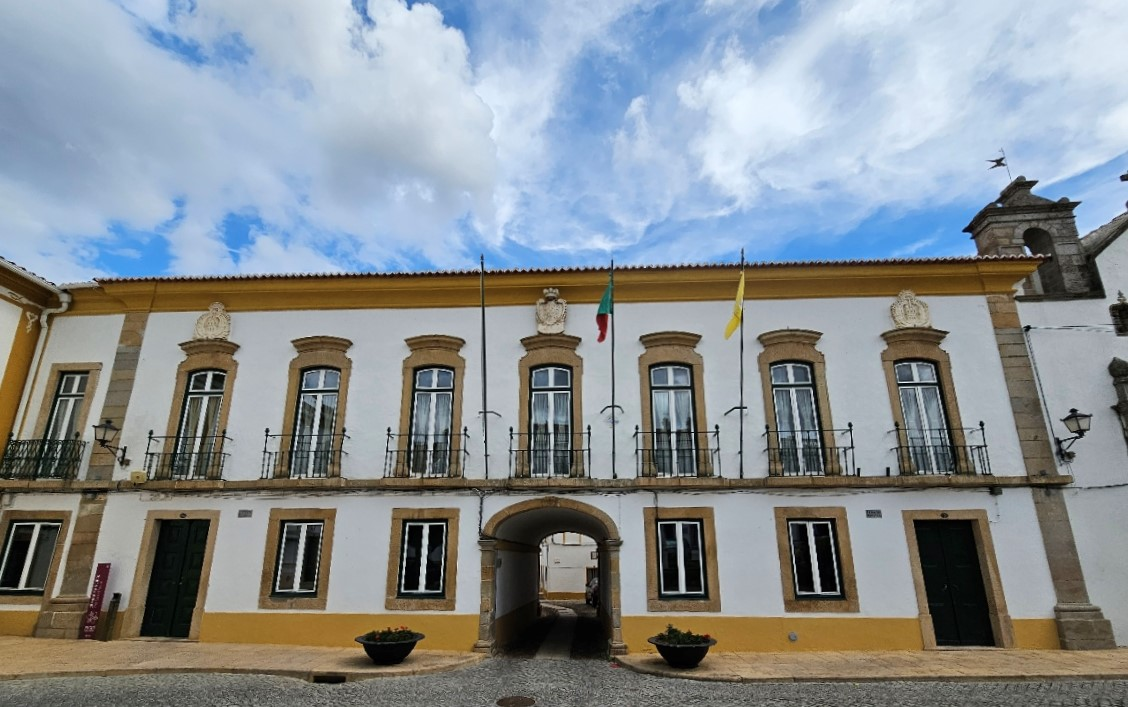
- Paços do Concelho de Nisa

Website
- www.cm-nisa.pt

The Nisa Municipal Chamber (Portuguese: Câmara Municipal de Nisa) is the administrative authority in the municipality of Nisa. It has 7 freguesias in its area of jurisdiction and is based in the town of Nisa, on the Portalegre District. These freguesias are: Alpalhão; Arez e Amieira do Tejo; Espírito Santo, Nossa Senhora da Graça e São Simão; Montalvão; Santana; São Matias and Tolosa.

The Nisa City Council is made up of 5 councillors, representing, currently, three different political forces. The first candidate on the list with the most votes in a municipal election or, in the event of a vacancy, the next candidate on the list, takes office as President of the Municipal Chamber.

== List of the Presidents of the Municipal Chamber of Nisa ==
- António Pires Bento – (1976–1979)
- Carlos Bento Correia – (1979–1982)
- José Manuel Semedo Basso – (1982–2001)
- Maria Tsukamoto – (2001–2013)
- Maria Idalina Alves Trindade – (2013–2025)

(The list is incomplete)
