= Banta (disambiguation) =

Banta or goli soda is a carbonated lemon or orange-flavoured soft drink popular in India.

Banta may also refer to:

== Places ==
- Banta, California, an unincorporated community
- Banta, Indiana, an unincorporated community
- an early name of Dunlap, Missouri, an unincorporated community
- Banta Island, one of the Lesser Sunda Islands, Indonesia
- the 'Banța', a hill next to the center of the town of Ocna Mureș, Romania

== People ==
- Albert Franklin Banta (1843–1924), American newspaperman, politician, jurist and army scout
- Arthur M. Banta (1877–1946), American zoologist
- Bradford Banta (born 1970), American former football player
- George Banta (1857–1935), American businessman
- Jack Banta (American football) (1917–1977), American National Football League player
- Jack Banta (baseball) (1925–2006), American Major League Baseball pitcher
- Lisa Banta (born 1979), American Paralympic goalball player and discus thrower
- Melissa Elizabeth Riddle Banta (1834–1907), American poet
- Parke M. Banta (1891–1970), a United States Representative from Missouri

== Fictional characters ==
- Tony Banta, in the American TV series Taxi, played by Tony Danza
- Banta, a stock character in Sardarji jokes

== Other uses ==
- Golisoda (English title Banta), a 2016 Indian Kannada-language film
- Banta, a work by American photographer Osamu James Nakagawa (born 1962)
- Banta (butterfly), a genus of butterflies
- Neoregelia 'Banta', a hybrid cultivar
- bantã, a Malinké name for the Ceiba pentandra tropical tree
- Banta Corporation, a former America printing, imaging, and supply chain management company
- Manta language (also Banta), spoken in Cameroon
- banta, a Swedish verb for "being on a diet", derived from dieting pioneer William Banting (1796–1878)

== See also ==
- Jean LaBanta (c. 1879–after 1926), American conman, forger and train robber
- Bantè, a town, arrondissement, and commune in western Benin
- Benta, a town in Malaysia
- Benta (instrument), a Jamaican musical instrument
- Bente (disambiguation)
