= Arez (disambiguation) =

Arez (born 1991) is a Mexican luchador better known as El Clon.

Arez may also refer to:

- Arez (Nisa), a former parish of Nisa, Portugal
- Arez Ahmed (born 1991), Pakistani actor and model
- Arez Cobain (born 1988), American rapper
- Arez, a brand used for AMD graphics cards marketed by Asus

== See also ==
- Arez e Amieira do Tejo, a parish of Nisa, Portugal
