= Arez (Nisa) =

- Civil parish
- Location in Portugal
- Coordinates: 39°29′5″N 7°43′30″W
- Country: Portugal
- Region: Alentejo
- Intermunic. comm.: Alto Alentejo
- District: Portalegre
- Municipality: Portel

Area
  - Total: 55.72 km^{2} (21.51 sq mi)

Population (2011)
  - Total: 256
  - Density: 4.6/km^{2} (12/sq mi)
- Time zone: UTC+00:00 (WET)
  - Summer (DST): UTC+01:00 (WEST)

Arez is a former civil parish in the municipality of Nisa, Portugal. The population in 2011 was 256, in an area of 55.72 km^{2}. On 28 January 2013, the parish merged with Amieira do Tejo to form the new parish of Arez e Amieira do Tejo.

== Population ==
Population of the parish of Arez
1864	1878	1890	1900	1911	1920	1930	1940	1950	1960	1970	1981	1991	2001	2011
412	506	585	579	697	729	787	936	1 008	878	615	512	464	362	256
