= Mesquita Machado =

Portuguese politician

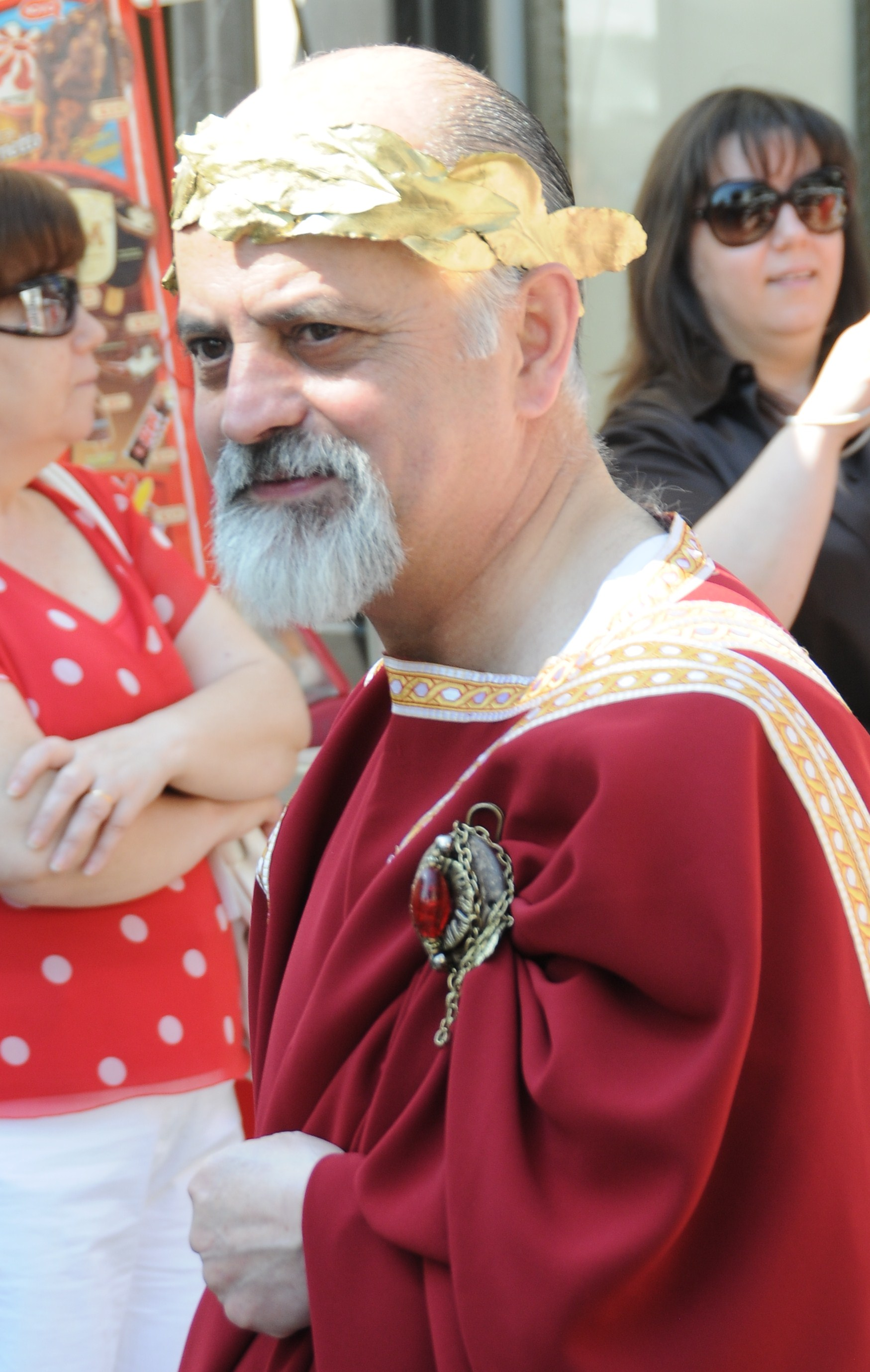
Mesquita Machado at a Roman festival in 2011

Francisco Soares Mesquita Machado (born 18 April 1947), commonly known as simply Mesquita Machado, is a Portuguese former politician. A member of the Socialist Party, he was the mayor of Braga from the first democratic elections in 1976 until 2013. He was also a member of the Assembly of the Republic from the first elections in 1976 until 1991.

== Early life ==
Mesquita Machado was born in 1947 in Pousada de Saramagos, a small village near Vila Nova de Famalicão in Braga District. At age five he migrated to Venezuela with his parents, and at 13 he returned to attend school in Braga while living with a great aunt. He is a qualified Metallurgical Engineer.

== Political career ==
Mesquita Machado joined the Socialist Party in 1975 and was elected to the Assembly of the Republic in the following year's election, the first free elections since the Carnation Revolution. He served in the cabinet of prime minister Mário Soares.

In the local elections of December 1976, 29-year-old Mesquita Machado was voted mayor of Braga, again in the first such democratic elections. He was still in power in October 2009, when he won the majority of votes against his PSD rival Ricardo Rio.

Having won ten consecutive local elections, Mesquita Machado was unable to contest the September 2013 elections due to a new term-limit law barring candidates from exceeding three consecutive terms as mayor. His party lost control of Braga City Hall to Rio's right-wing coalition.

== Legal issues ==
In October 2017, Mesquita Machado and five members of his former local government were put on trial for allegedly attempting to expropriate properties to benefit his daughter and son-in-law; the proposed deal was cancelled by the new local government. He was convicted and given a suspended sentence of three years in July 2018, confirmed on appeal a year later. In October 2020, the conviction was upheld by the Constitutional Court.

In February 2020, Mesquita Machado was acquitted of accusations of favouritism in the allocation of contracts to build parking spaces in Braga.

== Honours ==
On 10 June 1990, Mesquita Machado was made a Commander of the Order of Prince Henry. On 3 January 2003, Spain made him a Commander of the Order of Civil Merit.
