= Castle of Amieira do Tejo =

Portuguese castle

Castle of Amieira
- Castelo de Amieira
- Portalegre, Alto Alentejo, Alentejo in Portugal
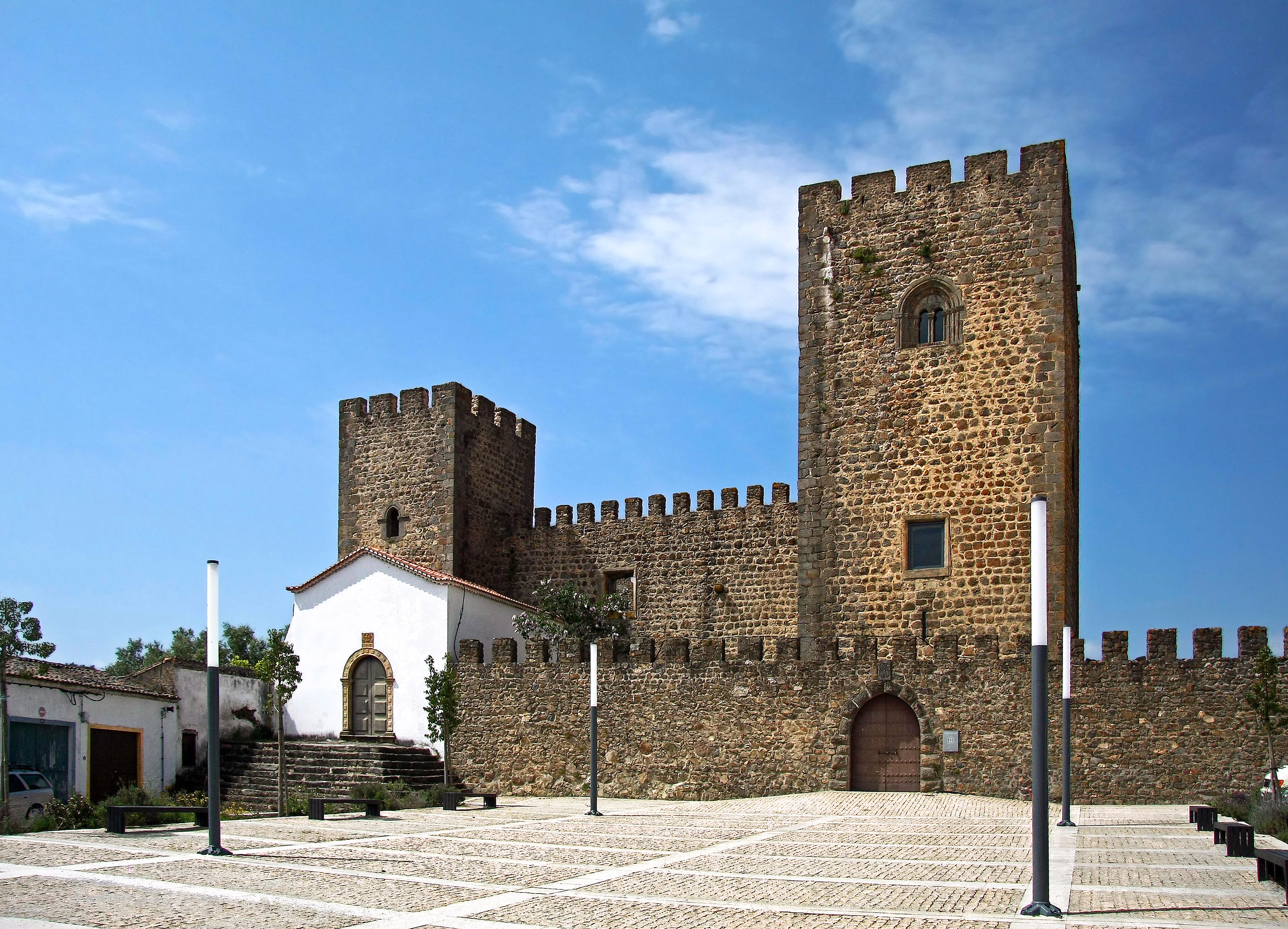
- Towers of the Amieira do Tejo, part of the medieval castle complex

Site information
- Type: Castle
- Owner: Portuguese Republic
- Open to the public: Public

Location
- Coordinates: 39°30′28.90″N 7°48′58.41″W

Site history
- Built: c. 1256
- Materials: Granite, Calcium Oxide, Sand, Wood, Tile

The Amieira do Tejo Castle is a Portuguese castle in the civil parish of Amieira do Tejo, municipality of Nisa, in the antique district of Portalegre, approximately 200 kilometres from the city of Lisbon.

== History ==
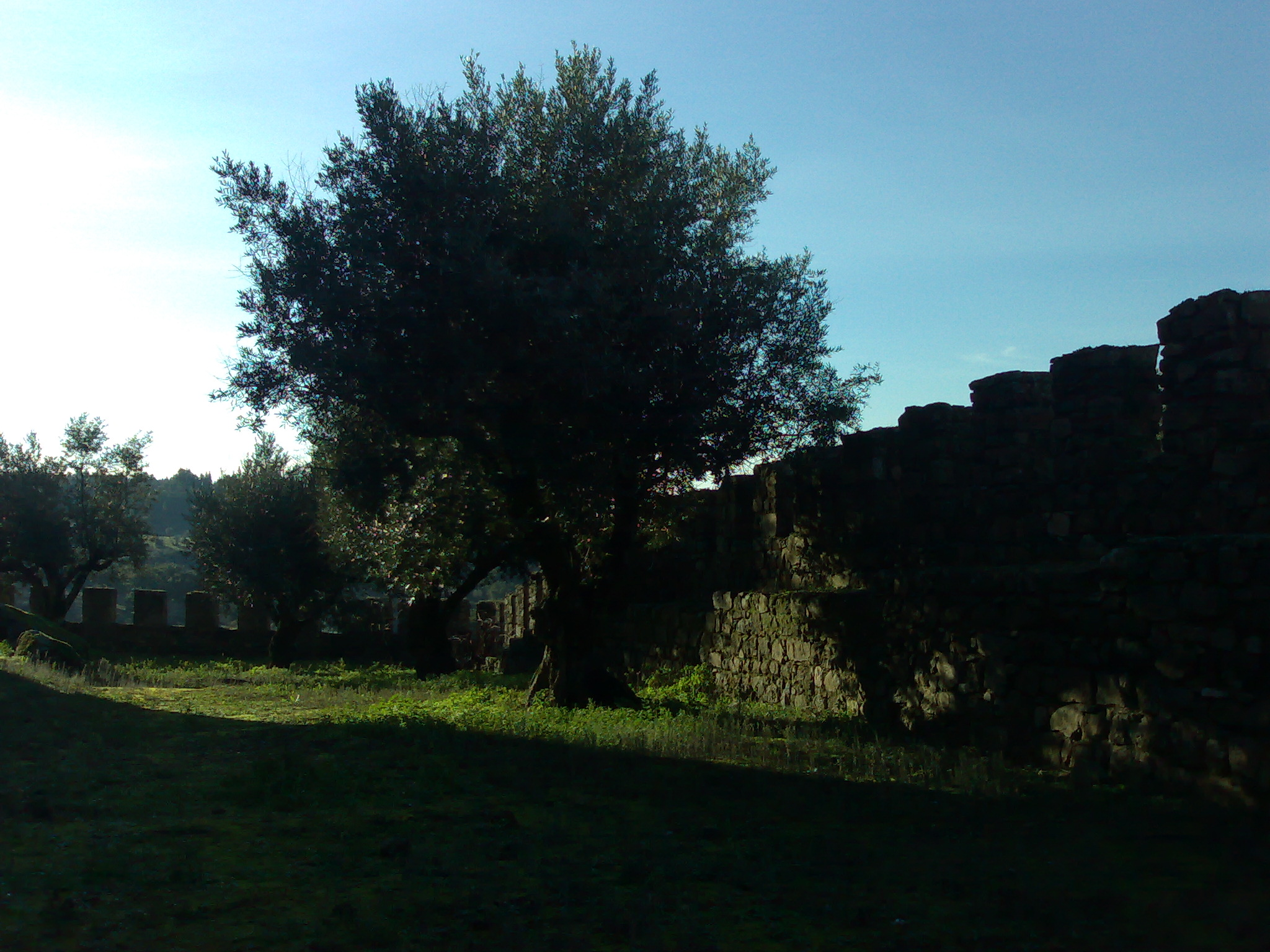
The barbican of the Castle of Amieira do Tejo

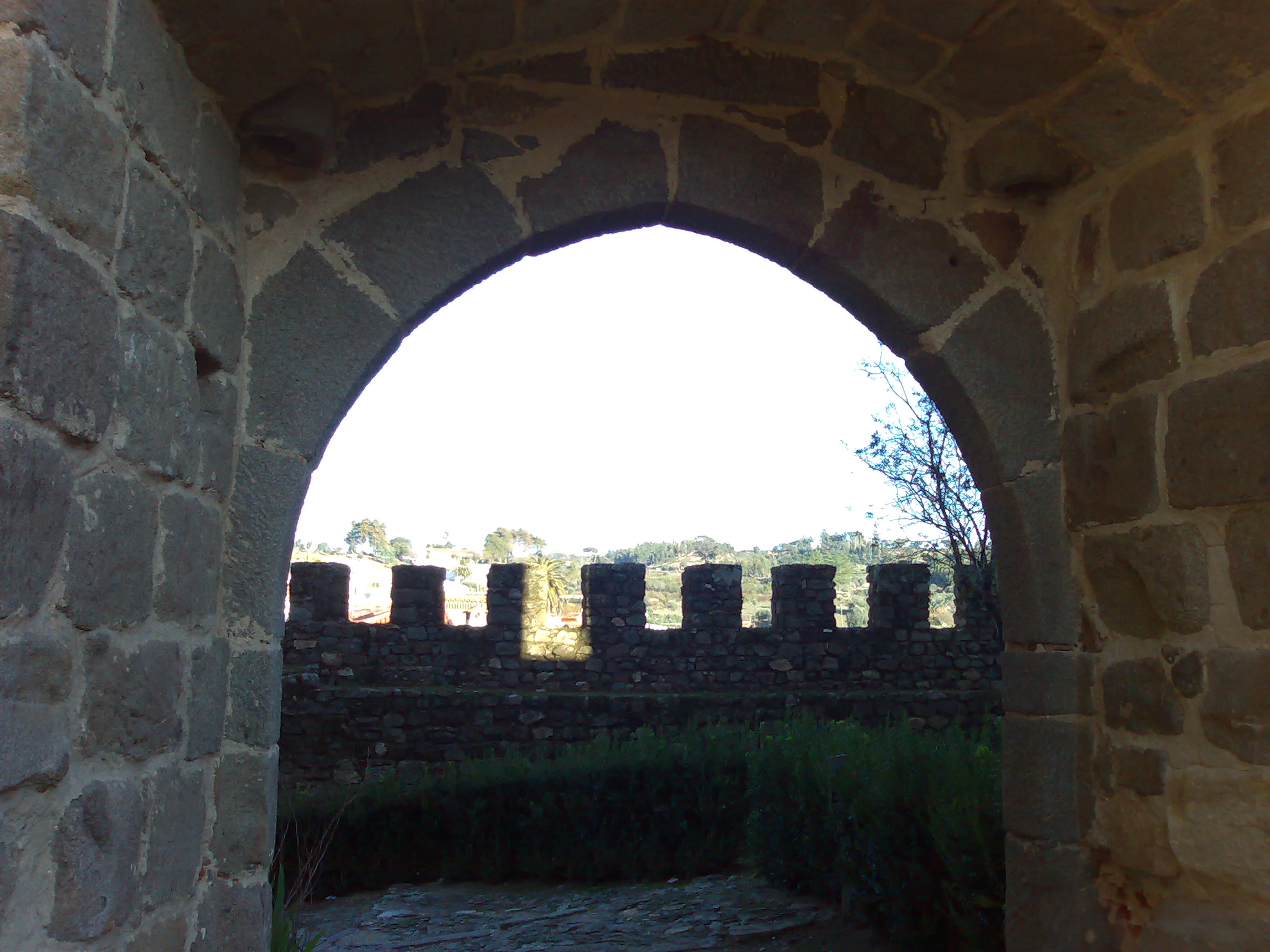
Example of the medieval Gothic architecture, with the wall of the fortress in the distance

In 1232, owing to a regal charter issued by King Sancho II, the dominion of the Knights Hospitaler expanded their influence into the south; the religious order expanded into the villas of Amieira, Gavião and Crato. In Crato, they carried out construction projects, to establish their institutional seat, just after the donation.

The construction of the castle in Amieira only developed a century after the Hospitalers had taken possession of the territory. Its construction was the responsibility of Álvaro Gonçalves Pereira, son of the Archbishop of Braga Gonçalo Pereira, prior of the Order of the Hospital and father of the future-constable of the kingdom, Nuno Álvares Pereira. It was Gonçalo Pereira who had originally been responsible for transferring the Order from Leça do Bailio to Crato e Mártires (in 1356). The castle of Amieira was constructed as part of the settlement's place in the new function of the Order: to assist the travelling pilgrims. Three years following this change in roles, King Peter I visited the fortress, whose construction was already quite advanced. But, by 1362, the project had not been concluded: Álvaro Gonçalves Pereira had taken a lot of pacience in the construction and evolution of the castle, until his death in 1375.

The fortress suffered various modifications over the centuries. During the reigns of King John II and King Manuel, there were remodelling to adapt the structure to the new military requirements. Simultaneously, it served as a prison, due to its excellent construction. Losing its military function, due to the change in the lines of defence over time, the castle fell in importance. In the 18th century, a great part of the historical structure was abandoned, and part of the fortress was adapted for civil residences. By this time, the prison tower was partially recuperated, but its military functionally was completed abandoned.

In the 19th century, the central courtyard was converted into a local cemetery, which continued to be used in this form until the 1940s, when the DGEMN promoted the castles reconstruction. It has been listed as a National monument since 10 November 1922.

== Architecture ==
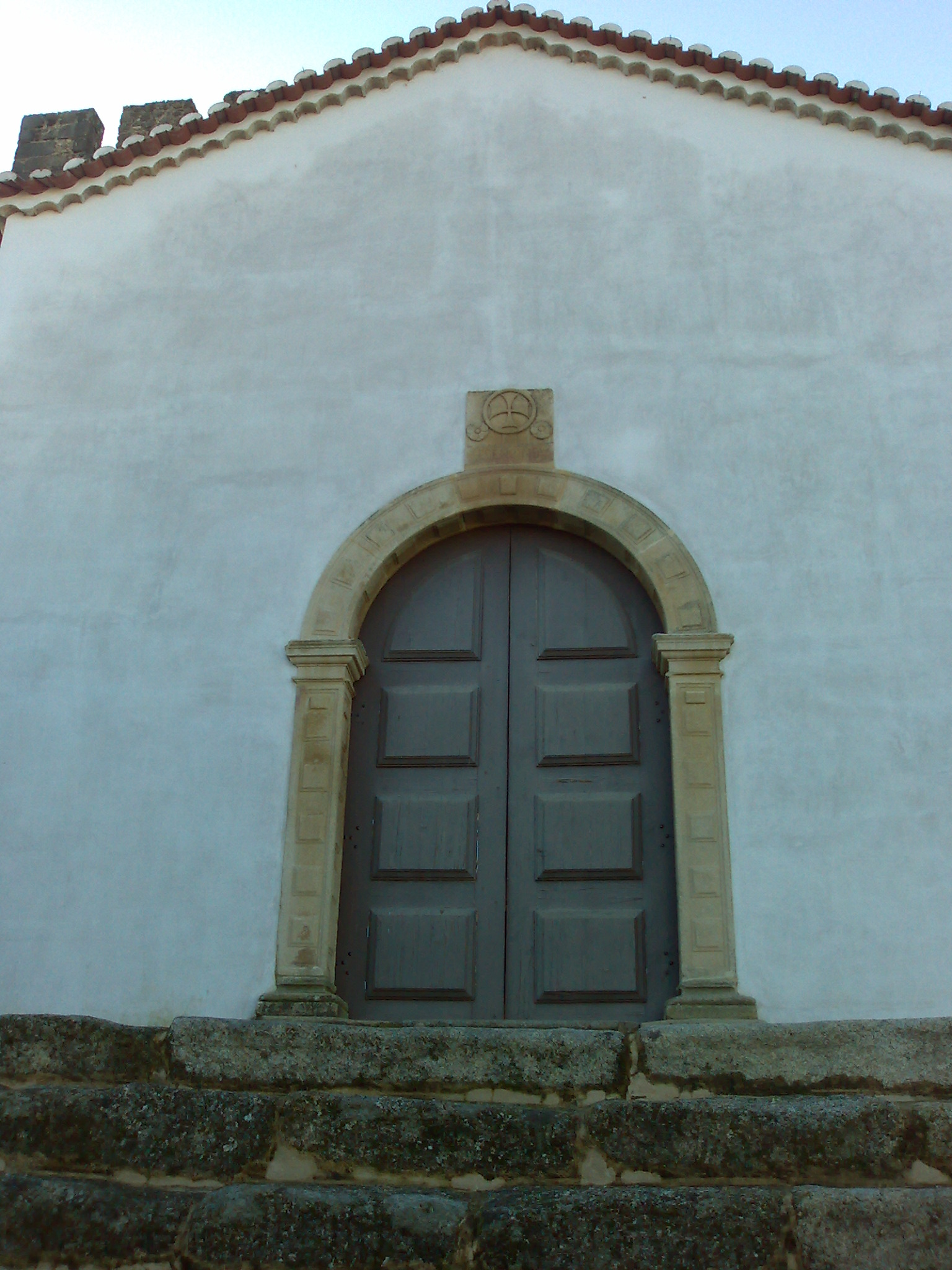
The entrance to the Gothic Chapel of São João Baptista

The castle is accessed from the Praça de Nun'Alvares, and can be reached from the EN 359 motorway, or alternately from the A6, existing from Torres Novas, IP6 until Abrantes, and the EN 118 roadway towards Nisa (exiting in Arez). The castle is found in an urban environment, isolated in a terrain with manicured gardens and space for parking. It is sited on a parcel that is relatively planar, except on the western limits where it is inclined, with houses to the north and east, while agricultural fields and orchards to the south and west.

The Castle of Amieira is the prototypical Gothic Portuguese castle. It is located on a relatively low hilltop, in a rectangular plan consisting of a walled courtyard with four towers located at its apexes. The prison block which is located in the largest of these towers, is located above the principal entrance to the fortress. In comparison to the isolated Romanesque cell blocks, the tower also served the defence of the castle, in an area that was most vulnerable. The central courtyard, which is an ample space, allows the space for placement of troops and easy movement. The castle also provides two levels of complementary defence, as indicated in 14th century documentation: a pit (which has not survived to today), and a barbican to the rear of the fortress, that formed a secondary landing in case of siege.

Encountered by one of the towers, but outside its walls, is the Chapel of São João Baptista, which dates back to 1556 (from its doorway inscription). The interior has a vaulted decorated ceiling, with an image of the patron saint (Saint John) and a retable from the late Renaissance period.
