= Ricardo Rio =

Portuguese politician (born 1972)

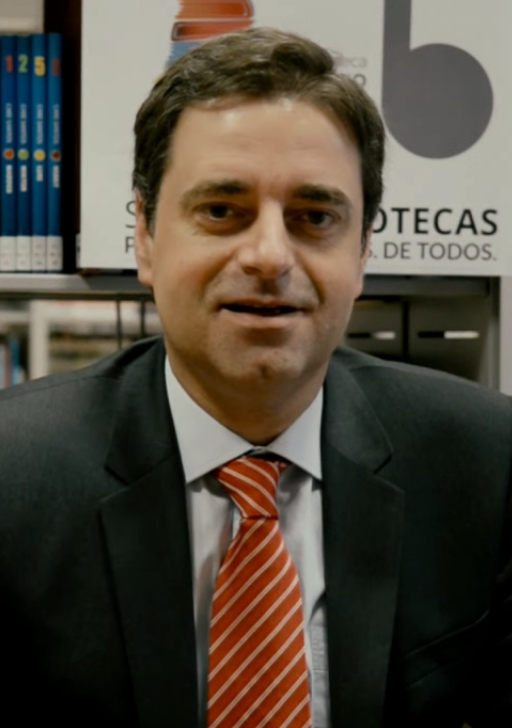
- Ricardo Rio in 2016

Mayor of Braga
- In office 21 October 2013 – 3 November 2025
- Deputy: Firmino Marques (2013–2021); Sameiro Araújo (2021–2025)
- Preceded by: Mesquita Machado
- Succeeded by: João Rodrigues

Member of the Braga City Council
- Incumbent
- Assumed office 9 October 2005

Member of the Braga Municipal Assembly
- In office 16 December 2001 – 8 October 2005

Personal details
- Born: Ricardo Bruno Antunes Machado Rio; 21 November 1972 (age 53) Braga, Portugal
- Party: Social Democratic Party
- Children: 3
- Education: University of Porto
- Profession: Economist

Ricardo Bruno Antunes Machado Rio (born 21 November 1972) is a Portuguese economist and politician, currently serving as mayor of Braga.

A member of the Social Democratic Party (PSD), he became mayor in the 2013 local elections in coalition with the CDS – People's Party and People's Monarchist Party. Since the first democratic elections in 1976, the city had been presided over by Mesquita Machado of the Socialist Party, who did not run in 2013 due to term limits.

In April 2017, the PSD voted unanimously for him to be their mayoral candidate for the elections in October. One of his policies was to convert Braga into a smart city. He won a second term, with his right-wing coalition getting 53% of the votes.

Rio's coalition, now including the Alliance, won a third absolute majority in 2021. He called this victory one in a "very different scenario" due to the arrival of rival right-wing parties in Chega and the Liberal Initiative.
