= Bente =

Bente may refer to:

- Bente (name), including a list of people with that name
- Bente, Portugal
- Bente (album), a 2013 compilation album by Parokya ni Edgar
