= Bente (name) =

Bente is a given name, a variant of Benedicte in Danish and Norwegian. Notable people with the name include:

- Bente Angell-Hansen (born 1951), Norwegian diplomat
- Bente Bakke (born 1942), Norwegian politician
- Bente Børsum (born 1934), Norwegian actress
- Bente Clod (born 1946), Danish poet and writer
- Bente Engesland (born 1962), Norwegian editor
- Bente Erichsen (born 1949), Norwegian director
- Bente Estil (born 1970), Norwegian politician
- Bente Halkier (born 1964), Danish sociologist
- Bente Hammer (born 1950), Danish textile designer
- Bente Hansen (1940–2022), Danish writer and editor
- Bente Hansen (gymnast) (born 1953), Norwegian gymnast
- Bente Juncker (born 1944), Danish politician
- Bente Kahan (born 1958), Norwegian musician
- Bente Kvitland (born 1974), Norwegian footballer
- Bente Stein Mathisen (born 1956), Norwegian politician
- Bente Haukland Næss (born 1954), Norwegian politician
- Bente Nordby (born 1974), Norwegian footballer
- Bente Scavenius (born 1944), Norwegian art historian
- Bente Skari (born 1972), Norwegian cross-country skier
- Bente Thorsen (born 1958), Norwegian politician
