= Joane =

- Civil parish
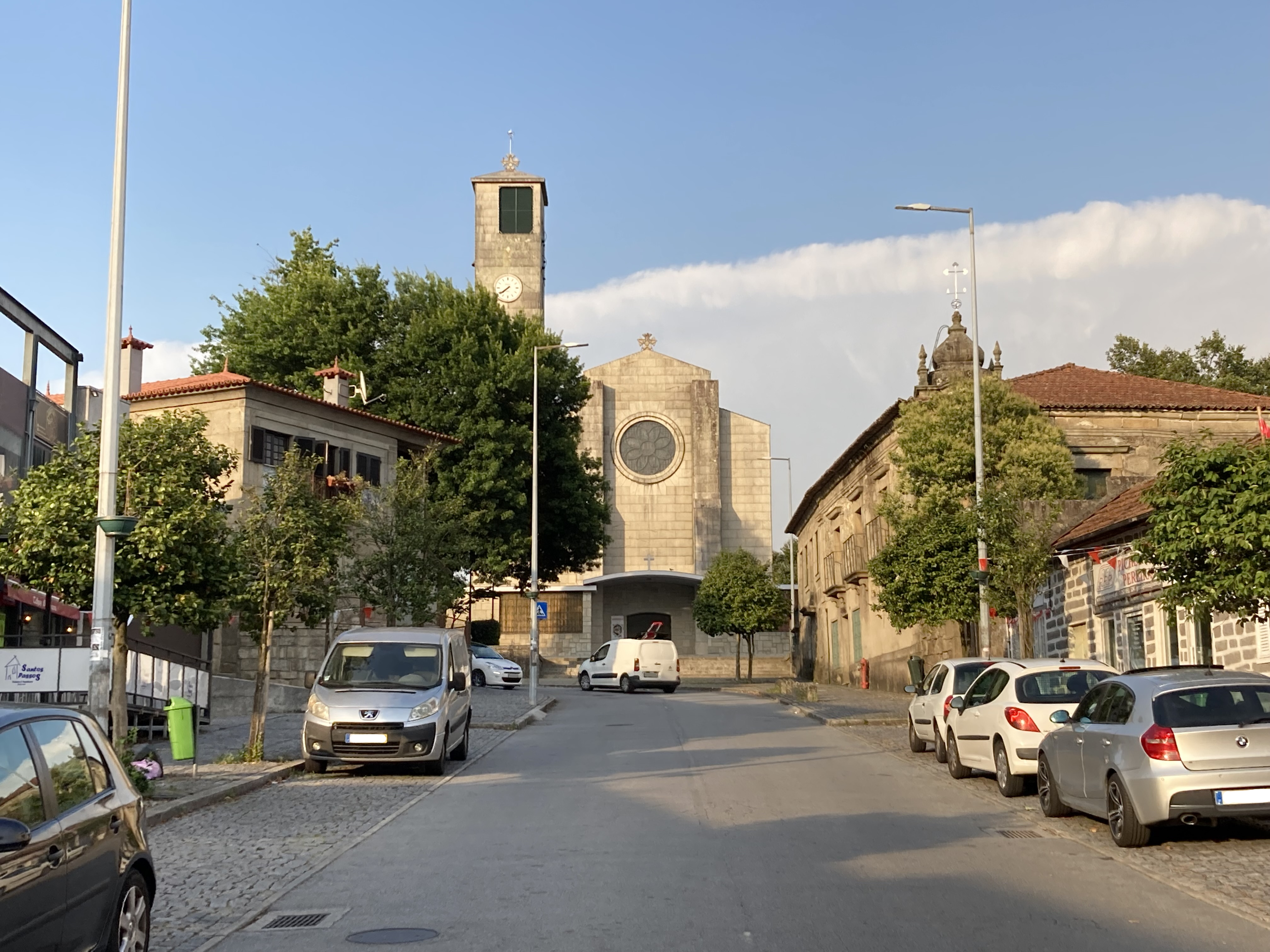
- Coordinates: 41.434°N 8.416°W
- Country: Portugal
- Region: Norte
- Intermunic. comm.: Ave
- District: Braga
- Municipality: Vila Nova de Famalicão

Area
  - Total: 7.32 km^{2} (2.83 sq mi)

Population (2011)
  - Total: 8,089
  - Density: 1,100/km^{2} (2,900/sq mi)
- Time zone: UTC+00:00 (WET)
  - Summer (DST): UTC+01:00 (WEST)

Joane is a civil parish in the municipality of Vila Nova de Famalicão, Portugal. The population in 2011 was 8,089, in an area of 7.32 km^{2}. It is the birthplace of Bernardino Machado, two times President of Portugal during the First Republic.
