= Bente, Portugal =

Coordinates: 41.389°N 8.450°W

Bente is a former civil parish in the municipality of Vila Nova de Famalicão in the Minho region, Portugal. In 2013, the parish merged into the new parish Carreira e Bente. Its surface area is 1.30 km^{2} and its population, in 2001, was 959.
