= Opinion polling for the 2013 Portuguese local elections =

In the run up to the 2013 Portuguese local elections, various organisations carried out opinion polling to gauge voting intention in several municipalities across Portugal. Results of such polls are displayed in this article. The date range for these opinion polls are from the previous local elections, held on 11 October 2009, to the day the next elections were held, on 29 September 2013.

== Polling ==
=== Alcobaça ===
Polling firm/Link	Fieldwork date	Sample size	PSD	PS	CDU	CDS	BE	O	Lead
2013 local election	29 Sep 2013	—N/a	36.1; 3	19.8; 2	12.0; 1	17.5; 1	2.1; 0	12.5; 0	16.3
IPOM	17–18 Sep 2013	596	47.3	16.7	13.7	10.4	4.2	7.7	30.6
2009 local election	11 Oct 2009	—N/a	44.9; 4	20.9; 2	15.3; 1	5.2; 0	2.6; 0	11.1; 0	24.0

=== Aveiro ===
Polling firm/Link	Fieldwork date	Sample size	PSD CDS PPM	PS	BE	CDU	IND	O	Lead
2013 local election	29 Sep 2013	—N/a	48.6; 5	24.4; 3	4.0; 0	3.7; 0	10.1; 1	9.2; 0	24.2
Eurosondagem; Seats projection	16–17 Sep 2013	510	42.9; 5	27.5; 3	4.8 –	5.0 –	14.8; 1	5.0 –	15.4
Eurosondagem; Seats projection	18–19 Jul 2013	510	41.2; 4/5	25.9; 2/3	5.2 –	4.9 –	18.1; 2	4.7 –	15.3
Gemeo - IPAM	27 Jun–2 Jul 2013	400	41	12	1	1	7	38	29
Eurosondagem; Seats projection	28–29 May 2013	505	48.0; 5/6	32.9; 3/4	7.1 –	4.9 –	—N/a	7.1 –	15.1
2009 local election	11 Oct 2009	—N/a	53.8; 6	33.1; 3	5.1; 0	3.7; 0	—N/a	4.4; 0	20.7

=== Barcelos ===
Polling firm/Link	Fieldwork date	Sample size	PS	PSD	CDS	BE	CDU	PSD CDS PPM	IND	O	Lead
2013 local election	29 Sep 2013	—N/a	46.0; 6	—N/a	—N/a	1.9; 0	1.6; 0	35.0; 4	10.2; 1	5.3; 0	11.0
Eurosondagem; Seats projection	23–24 Sep 2013	711	39.3; 5	—N/a	—N/a	3.5 –	1.9 –	36.7; 4/5	14.8; 1/2	3.8 –	2.6
2009 local election	11 Oct 2009	—N/a	44.5; 6	43.4; 5	4.7; 0	1.8; 0	1.5; 0	—N/a	—N/a	2.6; 0	1.1

=== Batalha ===
Polling firm/Link	Fieldwork date	Sample size	PSD	PS	CDS	CDU	O	Lead
2013 local election	29 Sep 2013	—N/a	55.2; 5	15.7; 1	11.3; 1	4.0; 0	13.7	39.5
IPOM	7–9 Sep 2013	498	59.1	15.5	11.9	5.9	7.6	43.6
2009 local election	11 Oct 2009	—N/a	68.3; 5	14.1; 1	12.0; 1	1.7; 0	4.0	54.2

=== Braga ===
Polling firm/Link	Fieldwork date	Sample size	PS	PSD CDS PPM	CDU	BE	IND	O	Lead
2013 local election	29 Sep 2013	—N/a	32.8; 4	46.7; 6	8.8; 1	—N/a	5.3; 0	6.4; 0	13.9
Eurosondagem; Seats projection	22–24 Sep 2013	810	39.0; 5	43.8; 5/6	7.5; 0/1	—N/a	5.2 –	4.5 –	4.8
IPOM	18–19 Sep 2013	997	36.7	47.5	4.1	—N/a	7.2	4.4	10.8
Eurosondagem; Seats projection	27–28 Aug 2013	515	39.1; 5	42.9; 5	8.8; 1	—N/a	5.2 –	4.0 –	3.8
Eurosondagem; Seats projection	23–24 Jul 2013	610	40.8; 5/6	44.2; 5/6	7.0; 0/1	—N/a	4.4 –	3.6 –	3.4
Intercampus	8–14 Jul 2013	802	41	40	7	—N/a	4	8	1
Eurosondagem; Seats projection	26–27 May 2013	611	41.1; 5	43.3; 5	8.0; 1	—N/a	4.9 –	2.7 –	2.2
IPOM	13–17 May 2013	1,986	27.3	35.1	3.8	—N/a	1.7	32.0	7.8
Eurosondagem	3–5 Dec 2012	1,025	41.7	44.2	6.9	4.1	—N/a	3.1	2.5
Eurosondagem	3–5 Dec 2012	1,025	39.6	46.1	7.0	4.6	—N/a	2.7	6.5
Aximage	9–12 Oct 2012	506	37.8	42.6	3.5	3.6	—N/a	12.5	4.8
2009 local election	11 Oct 2009	—N/a	44.7; 6	42.0; 5	6.3; 0	4.0; 0	—N/a	2.9; 0	2.7

=== Bragança ===
Polling firm/Link	Fieldwork date	Sample size	PSD	PS	IND	CDS	CDU	BE	O	Lead
2013 local election	29 Sep 2013	—N/a	47.2; 4	26.0; 2	16.5; 1	2.1; 0	2.0; 0	1.0; 0	5.1	21.2
Pitagórica	15–17 Sep 2013	612	45.4	26.4	21.1	1.5	1.9	1.7	7.1	19.0
Eurosondagem; Seats projection	16–17 Sep 2013	501	42.9; 3/4	32.1; 2/3	13.1; 1	3.6 –	3.3 –	1.9 –	3.1	10.8
2009 local election	11 Oct 2009	—N/a	48.2; 4	27.8; 2	16.1; 1	2.4; 0	1.6; 0	1.3; 0	2.9	20.4

=== Cascais ===
Polling firm/Link	Fieldwork date	Sample size	PSD CDS	PS	CDU	BE	IND	O	Lead
2013 local election	29 Sep 2013	—N/a	42.7; 6	21.6; 3	11.2; 1	4.6; 0	7.6; 1	12.3; 0	21.1
Eurosondagem; Seats projection	18–19 Aug 2013	517	41.6; 5/6	28.7; 3/4	7.8; 1	5.2 –	10.5; 1	3.8 –	12.9
2009 local election	11 Oct 2009	—N/a	53.0; 7	26.7; 3	9.2; 1	6.2; 0	—N/a	4.9; 0	26.3

=== Chaves ===
Polling firm/Link	Fieldwork date	Sample size	PSD	PS	CDU	CDS	IND	O	Lead
2013 local election	29 Sep 2013	—N/a	39.4; 3	29.7; 3	6.2; 0	3.2; 0	15.0; 1	6.5	9.7
IPOM	19–20 Jun 2013	696	32.9	19.5	3.9	2.6	4.3	36.8	13.4
2009 local election	11 Oct 2009	—N/a	58.2; 5	31.1; 2	4.8; 0	2.7; 0	—N/a	3.2	27.1

=== Cinfães ===
Polling firm/Link	Fieldwork date	Sample size	PS	PSD	CDS	CDU	PSD CDS	O	Lead
2013 local election	29 Sep 2013	—N/a	57.7; 4	—N/a	—N/a	2.4; 0	36.5; 3	3.4	21.2
Eurosondagem	11–12 Sep 2013	505	56.5	—N/a	—N/a	3.7	36.6	3.2	19.9
2009 local election	11 Oct 2009	—N/a	60.9; 5	26.6; 2	6.2; 0	3.5; 0	—N/a	2.9	34.3

=== Coimbra ===
Polling firm/Link	Fieldwork date	Sample size	PSD CDS PPM	PS	CDU	BE	PSD PPM MPT	CDS	IND	O	Lead
2013 local election	29 Sep 2013	—N/a	—N/a	35.5; 5	11.1; 1	—N/a	29.7; 4	3.9; 0	9.3; 1	10.5; 0	5.8
Eurosondagem; Seats projection	13–15 Sep 2013	606	—N/a	36.2; 4/5	11.0; 1	—N/a	32.6; 4	6.8; 0/1	7.6; 1	5.8 –	3.6
Eurosondagem; Seats projection	5–6 Aug 2013	512	—N/a	34.8; 4/5	12.5; 1/2	—N/a	34.1; 4/5	6.3; 0/1	8.5; 1	3.8 –	0.7
2009 local election	11 Oct 2009	—N/a	41.6; 6	34.6; 4	9.8; 1	5.9; 0	—N/a	w.PSD	—N/a	8.2; 0	7.0

=== Covilhã ===
Polling firm/Link	Fieldwork date	Sample size	PSD	PS	CDU	CDS	BE	IND	O	Lead
2013 local election	29 Sep 2013	—N/a	15.0; 1	37.5; 3	11.0; 1	—N/a	1.8; 0	28.3; 2	6.4	9.2
Domp	18–20 Sep 2013	385	18.0	37.4	7.6	—N/a	1.3	28.4	7.3	9.0
2009 local election	11 Oct 2009	—N/a	56.7; 6	26.8; 3	7.5; 0	2.8; 0	2.5; 0	—N/a	3.7	29.9

=== Évora ===
Polling firm/Link	Fieldwork date	Sample size	PS	CDU	PSD	BE	CDS	PSD CDS	O	Lead
2013 local election	29 Sep 2013	—N/a	26.0; 2	49.3; 4	—N/a	3.9; 0	—N/a	14.7; 1	6.1	23.3
Eurosondagem; Seats projection	19–20 Aug 2013	503	32.4; 2/3	34.7; 2/3	—N/a	9.8; 0/1	—N/a	19.5; 1/2	3.7	2.3
2009 local election	11 Oct 2009	—N/a	39.5; 3	35.0; 3	17.7; 1	2.8; 0	2.3; 0	—N/a	2.8	4.5

=== Faro ===
Polling firm/Link	Fieldwork date	Sample size	PSD CDS MPT PPM	PS	CDU	IND	BE	O	Lead
2013 local election	29 Sep 2013	—N/a	33.9; 4	32.3; 4	12.8; 1	5.7; 0	4.8; 0	10.4; 0	1.6
Sociologest	5–7 Sep 2013	500	39.0	34.7	8.2	7.9	5.5	4.7	4.3
Eurosondagem; Seats projection	2–3 Sep 2013	505	34.7; 3/4	35.1; 3/4	10.0; 1	11.7; 1	3.4 –	5.1 –	0.4
2009 local election	11 Oct 2009	—N/a	42.7; 5	42.3; 4	5.3; 0	4.1; 0	3.0; 0	2.7	0.4

=== Felgueiras ===
Polling firm/Link	Fieldwork date	Sample size	PSD CDS	FF	PS	BE	CDU	PSD PPM	CDS	O	Lead
2013 local election	29 Sep 2013	—N/a	—N/a	—N/a	25.9; 3	1.7; 0	2.2; 0	58.3; 6	7.2; 0	4.8; 0	32.4
Eurosondagem	2–3 Oct 2012	525	52.5	—N/a	43.3	1.0	1.7	—N/a	—N/a	1.5	9.2
2009 local election	11 Oct 2009	—N/a	48.7; 4	25.7; 2	19.0; 1	1.3; 0	1.3; 0	—N/a	—N/a	4.1; 0	23.0

=== Funchal ===
Polling firm/Link	Fieldwork date	Sample size	PSD	PS	CDS	PND	CDU	BE	PS PND BE MPT PTP PAN	O	Lead
2013 local election	29 Sep 2013	—N/a	32.4; 4	—N/a	14.6; 1	w.PS	8.4; 1	w.PS	39.2; 5	5.4	6.8
Eurosondagem; Seats projection	17–18 Sep 2013	525	34.6; 4/5	—N/a	24.5; 2/3	w.PS	7.4; 0/1	w.PS	30.8; 3/4	2.7	3.8
Eurosondagem; Seats projection	9–10 Sep 2013	711	37.0; 4/5	—N/a	22.5; 2/3	w.PS	6.5 –	w.PS	31.0; 3/4	3.0	6.0
Eurosondagem; Seats projection	26–27 Aug 2013	510	36.4; 4/5	—N/a	24.8; 3	w.PS	6.9; 0/1	w.PS	28.8; 3/4	3.1	7.6
Eurosondagem	20–22 Nov 2012	707	41.6	18.3	16.0	3.5	7.3	4.2	—N/a	9.1	23.3
2009 local election	11 Oct 2009	—N/a	52.5; 7	13.5; 1	10.0; 1	8.5; 1	6.9; 1	4.4; 0	—N/a	4.6; 0	39.0

=== Golegã ===
Polling firm/Link	Fieldwork date	Sample size	PS	PSD	CDU	CDS	BE	PSD CDS	IND	O	Lead
2013 local election	29 Sep 2013	—N/a	38.5; 2	—N/a	7.4; 0	—N/a	—N/a	15.1; 1	34.5; 2	4.6	4.0
Consulmark2; Seats projection	17–18 Sep 2013	512	49.0; 3	—N/a	10.0 –	—N/a	—N/a	12.6 –	25.8; 2	2.6	23.2
2009 local election	11 Oct 2009	—N/a	60.9; 5	13.3; 0	7.9; 0	5.0; 0	0.5; 0	—N/a	—N/a	12.5; 0	47.6

=== Gondomar ===
Polling firm/Link	Fieldwork date	Sample size	IND	PS	PSD CDS	CDU	BE	O	Lead
2013 local election	29 Sep 2013	—N/a	—N/a	46.4; 7	22.1; 3	12.2; 1	3.6; 0	15.7	24.3
Eurosondagem; Seats projection	18–19 Sep 2013	603	—N/a	48.0; 6	33.0; 4	10.4; 1	4.6 –	3.0	15.0
Eurosondagem	5–7 Aug 2013	1,011	38.2	33.0	13.1	7.1	3.9	4.7	5.2
Domp	15–26 Jul 2013	501	28.5	37.8	14.9	7.1	1.7	10.0	9.3
Aximage	17–21 Sep 2012	500	—N/a	49.3	21.3	5.6	7.4	16.4	28.0
2009 local election	11 Oct 2009	—N/a	42.8; 5	29.3; 4	15.3; 2	5.9; 0	3.0; 0	3.8	13.5

=== Guarda ===
Polling firm/Link	Fieldwork date	Sample size	PS	PSD	CDS	BE	CDU	PSD CDS	IND	O	Lead
2013 local election	29 Sep 2013	—N/a	30.4; 2	—N/a	—N/a	3.7; 0	3.9; 0	51.4; 5	—N/a	10.6; 0	28.5
Eurosondagem; Seats projection	17–18 Sep 2013	503	44.2; 3/4	—N/a	—N/a	3.3 –	3.5 –	43.7; 3/4	—N/a	5.3 –	0.5
Eurosondagem; Seats projection	12–13 Aug 2013	501	27.5; 2/3	—N/a	—N/a	5.3 –	5.0 –	30.2; 2/3	27.7; 2/3	4.3 –	2.5
Eurosondagem	10–12 Dec 2012	1,010	54.8	21.9	6.6	3.9	7.6	—N/a	—N/a	5.2	32.9
2009 local election	11 Oct 2009	—N/a	55.8; 5	28.3; 2	5.2; 0	2.9; 0	2.7; 0	—N/a	—N/a	5.2; 0	27.5

=== Guimarães ===
Polling firm/Link	Fieldwork date	Sample size	PS	PSD	CDU	CDS	BE	PSD CDS MPT	O	Lead
2013 local election	29 Sep 2013	—N/a	47.6; 6	—N/a	8.3; 1	—N/a	2.0; 0	35.6; 4	6.4; 0	12.0
Eurosondagem; Seats projection	10–11 Sep 2013	611	48.0; 6	—N/a	10.0; 1	—N/a	3.8 –	34.2; 4	4.0 –	13.8
Eurosondagem; Seats projection	12–14 Jul 2013	603	49.6; 6	—N/a	9.6; 1	—N/a	4.2 –	33.8; 4	2.8 –	15.8
Eurosondagem; Seats projection	22–23 May 2013	610	51.0; 6	—N/a	11.0; 1	—N/a	2.2 –	33.0; 4	2.8 –	18.0
2009 local election	11 Oct 2009	—N/a	53.5; 7	27.4; 3	8.8; 1	4.7; 0	2.6; 0	—N/a	3.1; 0	26.1

=== Leiria ===
Polling firm/Link	Fieldwork date	Sample size	PS	PSD	CDS	BE	CDU	O	Lead
2013 local election	29 Sep 2013	—N/a	46.3; 7	27.9; 4	4.7; 0	3.3; 0	4.2; 0	13.5	18.4
IPOM	21–23 Sep 2013	800	53.3	31.4	4.0	4.4	3.2	3.6	21.9
2009 local election	11 Oct 2009	—N/a	44.9; 5	37.6; 5	7.7; 1	3.4; 0	2.4; 0	4.1	7.3

=== Lisbon ===
Exit poll

Polling firm/Link	Fieldwork date	Sample size	PS	PSD CDS MPT	CDU	BE	O	Lead
2013 local election	29 Sep 2013	—N/a	50.9; 11	22.4; 4	9.9; 1	4.6; 0	12.2; 0	28.5
UCP–CESOP	29 Sep 2013	9,663	51–55; 10/11	21–24; 4	9–12; 1/2	4–6; 0/1	–	30– 31
Eurosondagem	29 Sep 2013	7,597	52.0– 56.2; 10/11	21.2– 25.0; 4/5	8.7– 11.5; 1/2	4.8– 7.0; 0/1	–	30.8– 31.2
Aximage	23–27 Sep 2013	605	49.5	31.7	7.9	6.7	4.2	17.8
UCP–CESOP; Seats projection	21–23 Sep 2013	1,223	48; 9/10	26; 5	11; 1/2	7; 1	8 –	22
Eurosondagem; Seats projection	8–10 Sep 2013	825	50.0; 9/10	26.9; 5	11.0; 1/2	6.6; 1	5.5 –	23.1
Eurosondagem; Seats projection	4–5 Aug 2013	707	50.5; 9/10	29.5; 5/6	8.8; 1	6.3; 1	4.9 –	21.0
Eurosondagem; Seats projection	15–16 Jul 2013	825	52.5; 9/10	27.5; 5/6	9.0; 1	6.9; 0/1	4.1 –	25.0
Sociologest	14–18 Jun 2013	600	57.5	20.1	9.9	3.5	8.9	37.4
Eurosondagem; Seats projection	16–19 May 2013	811	52.1; 9/10	30.0; 5/6	8.6; 1	5.3; 0/1	4.0 –	22.1
Sociologest	6–11 May 2013	600	49.7	33.8	6.7	5.7	5.1	15.9
2009 local election	11 Oct 2009	—N/a	44.0; 9	38.7; 7	8.1; 1	4.6; 0	4.6; 0	5.3

=== Loures ===
Polling firm/Link	Fieldwork date	Sample size	PS	CDU	PSD PPM MPT	BE	CDS	O	Lead
2013 local election	29 Sep 2013	—N/a	31.2; 4	34.7; 5	16.0; 2	3.2; 0	3.1; 0	11.8; 0	3.5
Eurosondagem; Seats projection	25–26 Aug 2013	521	38.0; 5	33.2; 4	15.2; 2	4.8 –	3.6 –	5.2 –	4.8
Eurosondagem	21–25 Jun 2013	1,011	43.2	30.1	12.5	5.5	4.2	4.5	13.1
Eurosondagem	21–25 Jun 2013	1,011	41.0	33.7	12.9	4.9	3.8	3.7	7.3
2009 local election	11 Oct 2009	—N/a	48.2; 6	23.0; 3	16.1; 2	4.2; 0	3.8; 0	4.8; 0	25.2

=== Lousada ===
Polling firm/Link	Fieldwork date	Sample size	PS	PSD CDS	CDU	O	Lead
2013 local election	29 Sep 2013	—N/a	49.7; 4	44.8; 3	2.7; 0	2.8	4.9
Gemeo	12–14 Sep 2013	400	44.4	50.0	2.4	3.2	5.6
2009 local election	11 Oct 2009	—N/a	57.7; 4	37.6; 3	2.9; 0	1.8	20.1

=== Marinha Grande ===
Polling firm/Link	Fieldwork date	Sample size	PS	CDU	PSD	BE	CDS	MPM	+C	O	Lead
2013 local election	29 Sep 2013	—N/a	29.9; 2	24.8; 2	10.6; 1	2.8; 0	1.1; 0	12.0; 1	11.0; 1	7.9	5.1
IPOM	14–16 Sep 2017	599	38.4	15.7	12.3	0.4	2.6	10.4	11.6	8.6	22.7
2009 local election	11 Oct 2009	—N/a	36.1; 3	31.4; 3	17.7; 1	5.7; 1	—N/a	—N/a	—N/a	9.1; 0	4.7

=== Matosinhos ===
Polling firm/Link	Fieldwork date	Sample size	PS	NM	PSD CDS	CDU	BE	IND	PSD	CDS	O	Lead
2013 local election	29 Sep 2013	—N/a	25.3; 3	—N/a	—N/a	7.3; 1	3.6; 0	43.4; 6	9.3; 1	1.9; 0	9.2; 0	18.1
Domp	23–26 Sep 2013	513	13.9	—N/a	—N/a	5.7	0.5	43.5	6.8	1.6	28.0	29.6
Eurosondagem; Seats projection	19–20 Sep 2013	715	32.8; 4/5	—N/a	—N/a	7.2; 0/1	3.6 –	34.4; 4/5	14.4; 1/2	4.1 –	3.5 –	1.6
Pitagórica	25–30 Aug 2013	506	24.9	—N/a	—N/a	4.7	1.5	36.2	10.0	1.7	20.8	11.3
Eurosondagem; Seats projection	20–21 Aug 2013	511	31.0; 4	—N/a	—N/a	7.6; 1	4.0 –	32.9; 4	16.4; 2	4.3 –	3.8 –	1.9
GTriplo	6–7 Aug 2013	400	25.5	—N/a	—N/a	2.5	2.0	27.5	24.0	0.5	18.0	2.0
Eurosondagem; Seats projection	21–22 Jul 2013	710	30.9; 4	—N/a	—N/a	8.4; 1	3.7 –	33.0; 4	16.7; 2	3.8 –	3.5 –	2.1
Domp	20 May–6 Jun 2013	788	27.1	—N/a	12.0	6.3	3.8	42.4	—N/a	—N/a	8.6	15.3
Eurosondagem; Seats projection	29–30 May 2013	707	27.5; 3/4	—N/a	16.7; 2	8.0; 1	5.0 –	35.0; 4/5	—N/a	—N/a	7.8 –	7.5
Eurosondagem	13–19 Mar 2013	1,022	47.3	—N/a	—N/a	10.3	4.2	—N/a	22.5	4.9	10.8	24.8
Eurosondagem	13–19 Mar 2013	1,022	26.1	—N/a	—N/a	10.2	4.1	31.1	16.8	4.1	7.2	5.0
IPOM	25–30 Jan 2013	794	26.8	—N/a	—N/a	3.2	1.4	—N/a	8.8	1.2	55.4	18.0
IPOM	25–30 Jan 2013	794	7.9	15.9	—N/a	—N/a	—N/a	23.5	4.0	—N/a	48.7	7.6
2009 local election	11 Oct 2009	—N/a	42.3; 5	30.7; 4	17.1; 2	4.3; 0	2.7; 0	—N/a	—N/a	—N/a	2.8; 0	11.6

=== Mogadouro ===
Polling firm/Link	Fieldwork date	Sample size	PSD	PS	CDS	CDU	O	Lead
2013 local election	29 Sep 2013	—N/a	46.3; 3	46.5; 4	2.0; 0	0.8; 0	4.5	0.2
IPOM	10–12 Sep 2013	589	40.1	17.1	—N/a	0.3	42.5	23.0
IPOM	10–12 Sep 2013	589	40.6	22.1	5.3	1.4	30.6	18.5
2009 local election	11 Oct 2009	—N/a	54.3; 4	24.5; 2	15.7; 1	1.1; 0	4.3	29.8

=== Oeiras ===
Polling firm/Link	Fieldwork date	Sample size	IND	PS	PSD CDS PPM	CDU	BE	PSD	CDS	O	Lead
2013 local election	29 Sep 2013	—N/a	33.5; 5	18.3; 2	—N/a	9.2; 1	3.7; 0	19.2; 3	3.8; 0	12.4; 0	14.3
Eurosondagem; Seats projection	13–14 Aug 2013	511	28.5; 4	21.2; 3	—N/a	10.3; 1	4.0 –	25.2; 3	5.9 –	4.9 –	3.3
Sociologest	21–25 May 2013	600	21.5	14.6	—N/a	5.8	2.9	41.5	6.5	7.2	20.0
2009 local election	11 Oct 2009	—N/a	41.5; 5	25.8; 3	16.4; 2	7.3; 1	3.9; 0	—N/a	—N/a	5.1; 0	15.7

=== Ourém ===
Polling firm/Link	Fieldwork date	Sample size	PS	PSD	CDS	CDU	PSD CDS	IND	O	Lead
2013 local election	29 Sep 2013	—N/a	38.9; 3	—N/a	—N/a	3.2; 0	38.4; 3	11.4; 1	8.3	0.5
IPOM	19–20 Sep 2013	600	46.6	—N/a	—N/a	3.3	37.3	10.4	2.5	9.3
2009 local election	11 Oct 2009	—N/a	47.4; 4	43.3; 3	4.6; 0	3.2; 0	—N/a	—N/a	2.8	4.1

=== Paços de Ferreira ===
Polling firm/Link	Fieldwork date	Sample size	PSD	PS	CDS	CDU	O	Lead
2013 local election	29 Sep 2013	—N/a	44.4; 3	46.9; 4	1.4; 0	2.7; 0	4.6; 0	2.5
Gemeo	21–23 Sep 2013	400	47.9	43.5	0.6	1.9	6.1	4.4
2009 local election	11 Oct 2009	—N/a	52.4; 4	41.6; 3	2.4; 0	1.9; 0	1.8	10.8

=== Paredes ===
Polling firm/Link	Fieldwork date	Sample size	PSD	PS	CDS	CDU	BE	O	Lead
2013 local election	29 Sep 2013	—N/a	41.1; 5	40.9; 4	3.7; 0	6.4; 0	1.8; 0	6.1	0.2
Gemeo	5–7 Sep 2013	400	56	20	6	7	1	5	32
Gemeo	26–27 Apr 2012	400	70	10	7	—N/a	—N/a	13	60
2009 local election	29 Sep 2013	—N/a	57.8; 6	26.5; 3	8.5; 0	3.3; 0	1.5; 0	2.4	31.3

=== Penafiel ===
Polling firm/Link	Fieldwork date	Sample size	PSD CDS	PS	CDU	BE	O	Lead
2013 local election	29 Sep 2013	—N/a	50.5; 5	41.1; 4	3.2; 0	1.4; 0	3.8	9.4
Gemeo	17–19 Sep 2013	400	57.0	35.9	3.5	0.3	3.3	21.1
Gemeo	19–21 Sep 2012	400	63.8	27.4	0.6	1.7	6.4	36.4
2009 local election	29 Sep 2013	—N/a	64.2; 6	29.7; 3	3.0; 0	1.3; 0	1.8	34.5

=== Pombal ===
Polling firm/Link	Fieldwork date	Sample size	PSD	PS	BE	CDU	CDS	O	Lead
2013 local election	29 Sep 2013	—N/a	55.0; 6	26.7; 3	—N/a	3.2; 0	6.2; 0	8.9	28.3
IPOM	12–13 Sep 2013	599	55.1	29.2	—N/a	4.4	5.2	6.1	25.9
2009 local election	11 Oct 2009	—N/a	65.8; 7	26.6; 2	1.9; 0	1.7; 0	—N/a	4.0	39.2

=== Porto ===
Exit poll

Polling firm/Link	Fieldwork date	Sample size	PSD PPM	PS	CDU	BE	RM	NC	O	Lead
2013 local election	29 Sep 2013	—N/a	21.1; 3	22.7; 3	7.4; 1	3.6; 0	39.3; 6	1.1; 0	4.9; 0	16.6
UCP–CESOP	29 Sep 2013	8,777	22– 25; 3/4	21– 24; 3/4	7– 9; 1	3– 5; 0/1	36– 40; 5/6	–	–	14– 15
Eurosondagem	29 Sep 2013	6,983	19.4– 23.2; 3/4	25.0– 28.8; 3/4	7.0– 9.3; 1	4.0– 6.2; 0/1	30.0– 34.2; 4/5	1.0– 1.8; 0	–	5.0– 5.4
Eurosondagem; Seats projection	23–25 Sep 2013	1,010	26.9; 4	24.1; 4	10.5; 1	4.5 –	26.5; 4	3.9 –	3.6 –	0.4
Aximage	21–25 Sep 2013	602	27.5	28.1	8.3	4.1	29.2	—N/a	2.8	1.1
UCP–CESOP; Seats projection	21–23 Sep 2013	1,272	26; 3/4	24; 3/4	9; 1	5; 0/1	29; 4/5	2 –	5 –	3
IPOM	21–23 Sep 2013	1,000	37.5	26.6	8.1	5.0	14.4	2.5	5.9	10.9
Eurosondagem; Seats projection	6–7 Aug 2013	603	32.1; 5	23.8; 3/4	8.5; 1	4.5 –	24.8; 3/4	3.3 –	3.0 –	7.3
Eurosondagem; Seats projection	24–25 Jul 2013	810	32.5; 5	22.5; 3	8.4; 1	4.8 –	25.2; 4	3.6 –	3.0 –	7.3
IPOM	29–30 Jun 2013	1,020	39.6	24.9	4.9	4.7	16.2	3.6	6.1	14.7
Eurosondagem; Seats projection	20–22 May 2013	804	33.0; 5	24.8; 3/4	10.2; 1	4.3 –	25.0; 3/4	—N/a	2.7 –	8.0
IPOM	13–15 Apr 2013	2,962	41.0	21.8	9.5	6.0	17.2	—N/a	4.4	19.2
IPOM	17–23 Jan 2013	796	21.2	15.8	1.9	1.9	4.2	—N/a	55.0	5.4
IPOM	17–23 Jan 2013	796	31.7	13.5	—N/a	—N/a	12.1	—N/a	42.6	18.2
2009 local election	11 Oct 2009	—N/a	47.5; 7 (Note: In 2009, the PSD ran in a coalition with the People's Party (CDS–PP). However, in 2013 the coalition wasn't repeated and CDS–PP supported Independent candidate Rui Moreira.)	34.7; 5	9.8; 1	5.0; 0	—N/a	—N/a	3.1; 0	12.8

=== Porto de Mós ===
Polling firm/Link	Fieldwork date	Sample size	PS	PSD	CDS	CDU	O	Lead
2013 local election	29 Sep 2013	—N/a	56.5; 5	27.3; 2	3.8; 0	3.7; 0	8.7	29.2
IPOM	5–6 Sep 2013	499	58.7	33.7	1.2	0.6	5.8	25.0
2009 local election	11 Oct 2009	—N/a	58.9; 5	32.6; 2	2.5; 0	2.4; 0	3.6	26.3

=== Santa Cruz ===
Polling firm/Link	Fieldwork date	Sample size	PSD	IND	PS	CDU	O	Lead
2013 local election	29 Sep 2013	—N/a	23.1; 2	64.4; 5	—N/a	4.6; 0	7.8; 0	41.3
Eurosondagem; Seats projection	23–24 Sep 2013	411	41.1; 3	48.1; 4	—N/a	5.6 –	5.2 –	7.0
2009 local election	11 Oct 2009	—N/a	41.9; 3	32.0; 3	13.0; 1	5.0; 0	8.0; 0	9.9

=== Santa Maria da Feira ===
Polling firm/Link	Fieldwork date	Sample size	PSD	PS	CDS	BE	CDU	O	Lead
2013 local election	29 Sep 2013	—N/a	44.5; 6	35.3; 5	3.8; 0	4.0; 0	4.2; 0	8.1	9.2
IPOM	24–25 Jul 2013	997	50.7	35.4	1.3	3.0	2.7	6.9	15.3
2009 local election	11 Oct 2009	—N/a	48.1; 6	40.6; 5	3.5; 0	2.6; 0	2.5; 0	2.7	7.5

=== Santarém ===
Polling firm/Link	Fieldwork date	Sample size	PSD	PS	CDU	CDS	BE	IND	O	Lead
2013 local election	29 Sep 2013	—N/a	40.3; 4	32.3; 4	10.3; 1	2.6; 0	2.9; 0	3.9; 0	7.7	8.0
Eurosondagem; Seats projection	11–12 Aug 2013	507	42.2; 4/5	33.5; 3/4	8.2; 0/1	2.5 –	2.3 –	7.5; 0/1	6.1	8.7
2009 local election	11 Oct 2009	—N/a	64.5; 7	20.9; 2	5.7; 0	3.6; 0	2.4; 0	—N/a	2.9	43.6

=== Santo Tirso ===
Polling firm/Link	Fieldwork date	Sample size	PS	PSD PPM	CDS	CDU	IND	O	Lead
2013 local election	29 Sep 2013	—N/a	45.0; 5	32.7; 4	3.5; 0	6.2; 0	6.4; 0	6.2	12.3
Domp	25 Oct–1 Nov 2012	505	34.0	10.3	1.0	3.8	—N/a	50.9	23.7
Eurosondagem	11–12 Oct 2012	707	58.4	29.6	4.2	3.2	—N/a	4.6	28.8
2009 local election	11 Oct 2009	—N/a	47.6; 5	41.5; 4	4.5; 0	4.0; 0	—N/a	2.4	6.1

=== São João da Madeira ===
Polling firm/Link	Fieldwork date	Sample size	PSD	PS	CDS	CDU	BE	IND	O	Lead
2013 local election	29 Sep 2013	—N/a	38.0; 3	35.1; 3	3.0; 0	6.2; 0	2.3; 0	10.0; 1	5.5	2.9
Domp	18–21 Sep 2013	385	42.5	33.5	0.5	8.3	0.7	7.0	7.5	9.0
IPOM	26–29 Jul 2013	798	33.7	16.4	1.3	0.9	0.9	6.0	40.9	17.3
2009 local election	11 Oct 2009	—N/a	56.0; 5	26.4; 2	7.2; 0	5.8; 0	2.7; 0	—N/a	2.1	29.6

=== São Pedro do Sul ===
Polling firm/Link	Fieldwork date	Sample size	PSD	PS	BE	CDU	IND	O	Lead
2013 local election	29 Sep 2013	—N/a	37.7; 3	49.8; 4	1.3; 0	0.7; 0	6.6; 0	3.8	12.1
GTriplo	10–13 Sep 2013	750	31.3	25.2	2.8	2.1	—N/a	38.6	6.1
Eurosondagem; Seats projection	27–28 Aug 2013	511	38.0; 3	42.5; 4	7.0 –	3.3 –	4.7 –	4.5	4.5
2009 local election	11 Oct 2009	—N/a	58.6; 5	26.6; 2	8.9; 0	1.8; 0	—N/a	4.2	32.0

=== São Vicente ===
Polling firm/Link	Fieldwork date	Sample size	PSD	PS	CDS	CDU	BE	IND	O	Lead
2013 local election	29 Sep 2013	—N/a	30.9; 1	—N/a	—N/a	0.9; 0	1.1; 0	64.7; 4	2.4	33.8
Eurosondagem; Seats projection	13–16 Sep 2013	310	50.0; 3	—N/a	—N/a	1.5 –	1.1 –	43.3; 2	4.1	6.7
2009 local election	11 Oct 2009	—N/a	48.8; 3	33.7; 2	12.6; 0	0.7; 0	0.6; 0	—N/a	3.6	15.1

=== Sintra ===
Exit poll

Polling firm/Link	Fieldwork date	Sample size	PSD CDS MPT	PS	CDU	BE	IND	O	Lead
2013 local election	29 Sep 2013	—N/a	13.8; 2	26.8; 4	12.5; 1	4.5; 0	25.4; 4	16.9; 0	1.4
UCP–CESOP	29 Sep 2013	7,523	13– 16; 1/2	27– 31; 4/5	11– 14; 1/2	4– 6; 0/1	27– 31; 4/5	–	Tie
UCP–CESOP; Seats projection	21–22 Sep 2013	1,261	16; 2/3	30; 4/5	12; 1/2	5; 0/1	27; 3/4	10 –	3
Eurosondagem; Seats projection	12–13 Sep 2013	811	21.0; 3	25.5; 3/4	11.2; 1	6.5; 0/1	25.2; 3/4	10.6 –	0.3
Eurosondagem; Seats projection	1–2 Sep 2013	611	21.0; 2/3	25.0; 3/4	12.4; 1/2	6.2; 0/1	24.2; 3/4	11.2 –	0.8
Pitagórica	21–29 Aug 2013	701	23.5	26.3	6.8	7.5	23.3	12.6	2.8
Eurosondagem; Seats projection	14–15 Jul 2013	821	19.2; 2/3	26.0; 3/4	10.6; 1	7.4; 1	26.9; 3/4	9.9 –	0.9
Aximage	29 Jun–4 Jul 2013	513	14.8	28.4	8.6	—N/a	6.5	26.3	13.6
2009 local election	11 Oct 2009	—N/a	45.3; 6	33.7; 4	11.1; 1	5.9; 0	—N/a	4.0; 0	11.6

=== Vale de Cambra ===
Polling firm/Link	Fieldwork date	Sample size	PSD	CDS	PS	CDU	O	Lead
2013 local election	29 Sep 2013	—N/a	33.7; 2	46.0; 4	11.7; 1	2.9; 0	5.8	12.3
IPOM	26–28 Aug 2013	797	50.4	37.3	9.4	2.8	0.1	13.1
2009 local election	11 Oct 2009	—N/a	46.2; 4	37.6; 3	10.8; 0	2.2; 0	3.3	8.6

=== Valongo ===
Polling firm/Link	Fieldwork date	Sample size	PSD CDS	PS	IND	CDU	BE	PSD PPM	CDS	O	Lead
2013 local election	29 Sep 2013	—N/a	—N/a	38.9; 4	—N/a	8.3; 1	4.4; 0	36.7; 4	2.6; 0	9.1	2.2
GTriplo	19–22 Sep 2013	800	—N/a	28.9	—N/a	3.9	2.3	33.6	7.1	24.3	4.7
Domp	13–16 Sep 2013	386	—N/a	40.7	—N/a	6.2	6.7	39.9	1.5	4.9	0.8
Gemeo	28–30 May 2013	400	—N/a	30	—N/a	5	2	32	8	23	2
2009 local election	11 Oct 2009	—N/a	34.3; 4	27.2; 3	22.9; 2	4.6; 0	2.7; 0	—N/a	—N/a	8.3; 0	7.1

=== Viana do Castelo ===
Polling firm/Link	Fieldwork date	Sample size	PS	PSD CDS	CDU	BE	PSD	CDS MPT	O	Lead
2013 local election	29 Sep 2013	—N/a	47.7; 5	—N/a	10.6; 1	—N/a	26.6; 3	4.3; 0	10.9; 0	21.1
Eurosondagem; Seats projection	12–13 Sep 2013	511	50.9; 5/6	—N/a	10.9; 1	—N/a	25.1; 2/3	6.8 –	6.3 –	25.8
Eurosondagem; Seats projection	11–12 Jul 2013	511	53.2; 6	—N/a	10.9; 1	—N/a	23.6; 2	7.5 –	4.8 –	29.6
Eurosondagem; Seats projection	27–28 May 2013	510	52.0; 5/6	—N/a	9.8; 1	—N/a	25.0; 2/3	5.7 –	7.5 –	27.0
2009 local election	11 Oct 2009	—N/a	50.2; 5	35.1; 4	6.6; 0	4.8; 0	—N/a	—N/a	3.3; 0	15.1

=== Vila Nova de Famalicão ===
Polling firm/Link	Fieldwork date	Sample size	PSD CDS	PS	CDU	BE	O	Lead
2013 local election	29 Sep 2013	—N/a	58.6; 7	31.8; 4	3.7; 0	1.6; 0	4.4	26.8
Pitagórica	19–27 Sep 2013		55.8	30.3	7.9	4.5	1.5	25.5
2009 local election	11 Oct 2009	—N/a	55.9; 7	30.1; 4	5.9; 0	5.7; 0	2.4	25.8

=== Vila Nova de Gaia ===
Exit poll

Polling firm/Link	Fieldwork date	Sample size	PSD CDS	PS	CDU	BE	IND	O	Lead
2013 local election	29 Sep 2013	—N/a	20.0; 3	38.2; 5	6.4; 0	3.1; 0	19.7; 3	4.0; 0	18.2
UCP–CESOP	29 Sep 2013	5,364	16– 19; 2	38– 42; 5/6	7– 9; 1	3– 5 –	20– 23; 2/3	–	18– 19
GTriplo	23–24 Sep 2013	900	22.1	23.2	4.7	2.8	21.9	25.3	1.1
UCP–CESOP; Seats projection	22 Sep 2013	1,226	21; 3	32; 4	8; 0/1	5 –	26; 3/4	8 –	6
Eurosondagem; Seats projection	20–22 Sep 2013	808	25.1; 3	29.0; 3/4	7.5; 0/1	3.3 –	29.3; 3/4	5.8 –	0.3
Eurosondagem; Seats projection	3–4 Sep 2013	610	24.5; 3	27.1; 3/4	9.4; 1	4.1 –	28.4; 3/4	6.5 –	1.3
Eurosondagem; Seats projection	22–23 Jul 2013	811	24.8; 3	30.0; 3/4	7.7; 0/1	3.6 –	30.6; 3/4	3.3 –	0.6
Eurosondagem; Seats projection	23–26 May 2013	810	22.7; 2/3	32.2; 4	7.4; 0/1	3.8 –	30.7; 3/4	3.2 –	1.5
IPOM	7–10 May 2013	1,992	24.7	23.5	2.1	3.8	—N/a	45.8	1.1
IPOM	7–10 May 2013	1,992	13.9	15.7	3.0	3.1	15.9	48.4	0.2
2009 local election	11 Oct 2009	—N/a	62.0; 8	25.3; 3	6.3; 0	3.2; 0	—N/a	3.2; 0	36.7

=== Vila Real ===
Polling firm/Link	Fieldwork date	Sample size	PSD	PS	CDS	BE	CDU	O	Lead
2013 local election	29 Sep 2013	—N/a	42.2; 4	44.0; 5	4.8; 0	2.0; 0	2.4; 0	4.5	1.8
Eurosondagem; Seats projection	19–20 Sep 2013	509	41.2; 4/5	41.9; 4/5	5.4 –	5.1 –	3.7 –	2.7	0.7
Pitagórica	11–14 Sep 2013	610	44.5	42.1	5.4	3.3	1.4	3.3	2.4
Eurosondagem; Seats projection	16–17 Jul 2013	505	41.0; 4/5	42.1; 4/5	4.3 –	5.0 –	5.2 –	2.4	1.1
Eurosondagem; Seats projection	14–15 May 2013	503	44.2; 4/5	42.2; 4/5	5.3 –	3.0 –	2.8 –	2.5	2.0
2009 local election	11 Oct 2009	—N/a	51.4; 4	34.8; 3	5.8; 0	2.9; 0	2.5; 0	2.6	16.6

=== Vinhais ===
Polling firm/Link	Fieldwork date	Sample size	PS	PSD	CDS	CDU	CDS PSD	O	Lead
2013 local election	29 Sep 2013	—N/a	59.3; 5	—N/a	—N/a	1.6; 0	34.2; 2	5.0	25.1
Eurosondagem	26–27 Jun 2013	525	57.0	27.2	7.2	2.5	—N/a	6.1	29.8
Eurosondagem	26–27 Jun 2013	525	60.2	—N/a	—N/a	—N/a	33.6	6.2	26.6
2009 local election	11 Oct 2009	—N/a	68.4; 6	20.3; 1	6.2; 0	1.3; 0	—N/a	3.8	48.1

=== Viseu ===
Polling firm/Link	Fieldwork date	Sample size	PSD	PS	CDS	BE	CDU	O	Lead
2013 local election	29 Sep 2013	—N/a	46.4; 5	26.8; 3	9.6; 1	3.8; 0	4.0; 0	9.4	19.6
Eurosondagem; Seats projection	11–12 Sep 2013	515	48.0; 5	35.8; 4	7.0 –	2.6 –	3.5 –	3.1	12.2
Eurosondagem; Seats projection	17–18 Jul 2013	515	48.8; 5	38.8; 4	5.1 –	2.4 –	2.2 –	2.7	10.0
Eurosondagem; Seats projection	19–20 May 2013	511	50.0; 5/6	39.3; 3/4	3.6 –	2.6 –	2.1 –	2.4	10.7
2009 local election	11 Oct 2009	—N/a	62.1; 7	26.3; 2	5.2; 0	2.3; 0	1.5; 0	2.6	35.8
