= Amieira do Tejo =

- Civil parish
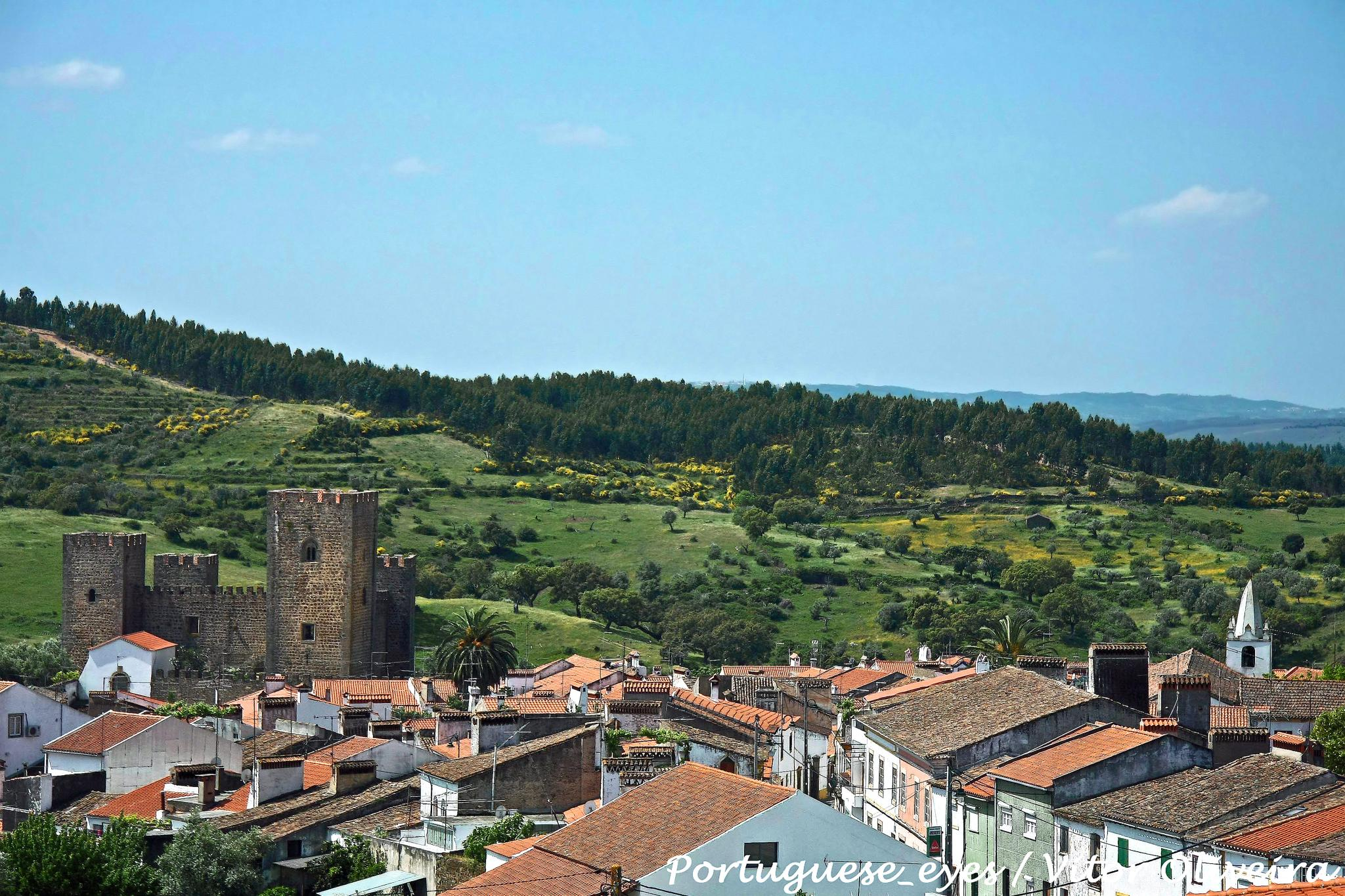

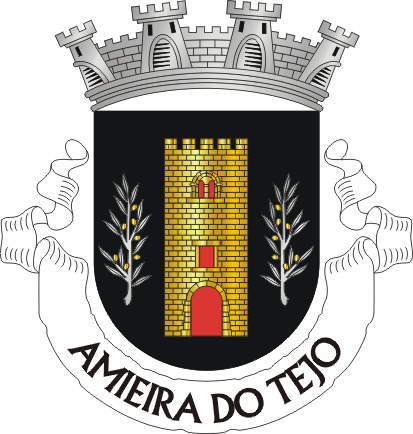
- Coat of arms

- Location in Portugal
- Coordinates: 39°30′N 7°49′W
- Country: Portugal
- Region: Alentejo
- Intermunic. comm.: Alto Alentejo
- District: Portalegre
- Municipality: Nisa
- Disbanded: 2013

Area
  - Total: 102.44 km^{2} (39.55 sq mi)

Population (2001)
  - Total: 309
  - Density: 3.02/km^{2} (7.81/sq mi)
- Time zone: UTC+00:00 (WET)
  - Summer (DST): UTC+01:00 (WEST)

Amieira do Tejo is a former civil parish in the municipality of Nisa, Portugal. In 2013, the parish merged into the new parish Arez e Amieira do Tejo. It has an area of 102.44 km^{2} and a population of 309 (2001). The 14th century Castle of Amieira do Tejo is situated in the parish.
