= Tolosa, Portugal =

Parish in Nisa, Portugal

Tolosa
- Civil parish
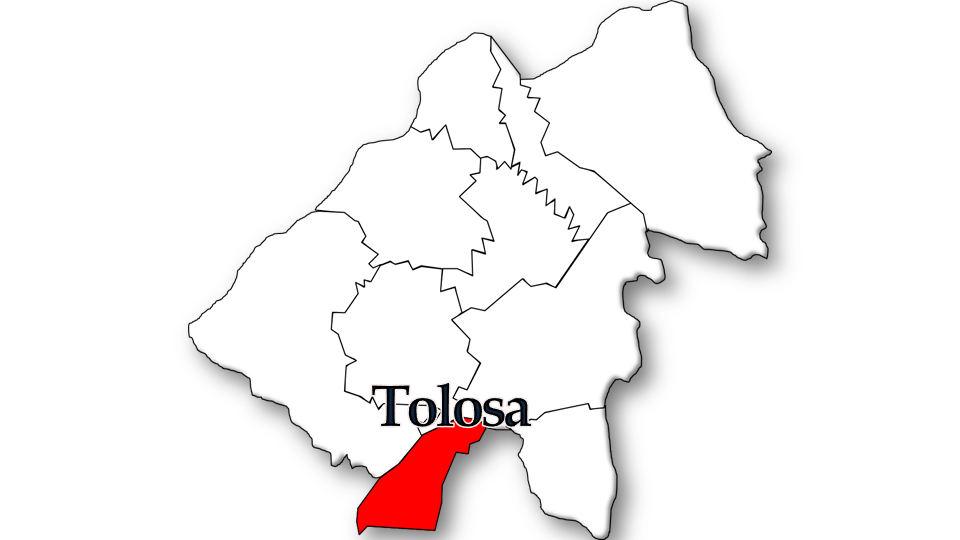
- Location of Tolosa inside Nisa

- Location in Portugal
- Coordinates: 39°25′26″N 7°43′07″W
- Country: Portugal
- Region: Alentejo
- Intermunic. comm.: Alto Alentejo
- District: Portalegre
- Municipality: Nisa

Area
  - Total: 23.43 km^{2} (9.05 sq mi)

Population (2011)
  - Total: 1,011
  - Density: 43.15/km^{2} (111.8/sq mi)
- Time zone: UTC+00:00 (WET)
  - Summer (DST): UTC+01:00 (WEST)

Tolosa is a civil parish in the municipality of Nisa, Portugal. The population in 2011 was 1,011, in an area of 23.43 km^{2}.

== History ==
Tolosa is a village with three forais. The first was granted by D. Afonso Peres, Prior of the Order of the Hospital in Portugal, in the year 1262. (Torre do Tombo, folio 6, follet 1, no. 31) The second was granted by D. Gonçalo Fagundes, Prior of the Order of the Hospital in Portugal, in the year 1281. (Torre do Tombo, folio 15, page 9, no. 18) At the time these two charters were issued, the headquarters of the Order of the Hospital in Portugal was in Leça do Balio. The third was approved by King Manuel I in the year 1517. (Torre do Tombo, forais de Tolosa, Gavetas, Gav. 6, mç. 1, n.º 31)

It was a municipality from its inception until 1836. Following the abolition of the municipality, it became a parish within the municipality of Alpalhão until 1853. Following the abolition of the latter, it became a parish within the municipality of Nisa until 1895. By decree, it became a parish in the municipality of Crato from 1895 to 1898. It returned to the municipality of Nisa in 1898, where it remains to this day.
