= Carreira e Bente =

- Civil parish
- Location in Portugal
- Coordinates: 41.380°N 8.437°W
- Country: Portugal
- Region: Norte
- Intermunic. comm.: Ave
- District: Braga
- Municipality: Vila Nova de Famalicão

Area
  - Total: 3.58 km^{2} (1.38 sq mi)

Population (2011)
  - Total: 2,576
  - Density: 720/km^{2} (1,900/sq mi)
- Time zone: UTC+00:00 (WET)
  - Summer (DST): UTC+01:00 (WEST)

Carreira e Bente is a civil parish in the municipality of Vila Nova de Famalicão, Portugal. It was formed in 2013 by the merger of the former parishes Carreira and Bente. The population in 2011 was 2,576, in an area of 3.58 km^{2}.
