= Pousada de Saramagos =

- Civil parish
- Coat of arms

- Location in Portugal
- Coordinates: 41.4292°N 8.4333°W
- Country: Portugal
- Region: Norte
- Intermunic. comm.: Ave
- District: Braga
- Municipality: Vila Nova de Famalicão

Area
  - Total: 2.12 km^{2} (0.82 sq mi)

Population (2011)
  - Total: 2,234
  - Density: 1,100/km^{2} (2,700/sq mi)
- Time zone: UTC+00:00 (WET)
  - Summer (DST): UTC+01:00 (WEST)
- Website: http://jf-pousada-saramagos.com/

Pousada de Saramagos is a Portuguese village belonging to the municipality of Vila Nova de Famalicão, in the North of Portugal, more precisely in the region of Minho. The population in 2011 was 2,234, in an area of 2.12 km^{2}. It is about 9 km far from its municipal seat.

== History ==
Since Pousada de Saramagos is located in one of the most ancient parts of Portugal, its history is very rich and it's also connected to the early evidence of the existence of Pousada de Saramagos can be found in texts dated of 1076, actually predating both the year of the de facto recognition of Portugal as a country and the papal bull issued by the pope to recognize it as a Christian country.

== Geography ==
Pousada de Saramagos is located in the Minho region of Portugal, halfway between Vila Nova de Famalicão and Guimarães. It belongs to the municipality of Vila Nova de Famalicão and its district capital is Braga.

== Population ==
Since the national census in 2001, the population of the parish grew more than 35%, to house more 784 inhabitants. Part of it is due to the building of houses in the north of the village, mainly Parque dos Loureiros.

== Notable people ==
- Mesquita Machado, mayor of Braga from 1976 to 2013
