= 2013 Portuguese local elections =

- 29 September 2013

All 308 Portuguese municipalities and 3,092 Portuguese Parishes All 2,086 local government councils
- Opinion polls
- Turnout: 52.6% ▼6.4 pp
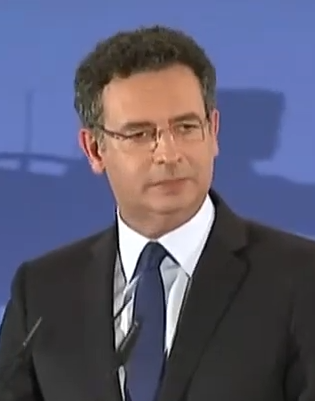

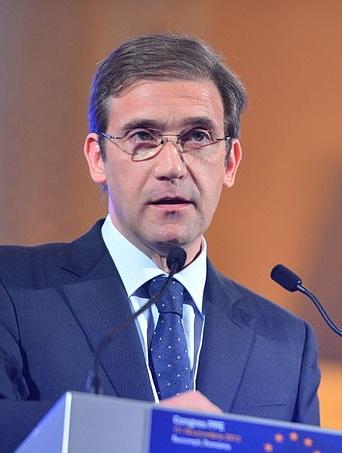

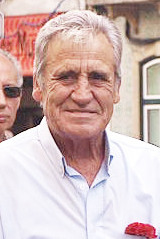
	First party	Second party	Third party
Leader	António José Seguro	Pedro Passos Coelho	Jerónimo de Sousa
Party	PS	PSD	PCP
Alliance			CDU
Last election	132 mayors, 37.7%	139 mayors, 38.7%	28 mayors, 9.8%
Popular vote	1,835,288	1,570,601	552,690
Percentage	36.7%	31.4%	11.1%
Swing	▼1.0 pp	▼7.3 pp	▲1.3 pp
Mayors	150	106	34
Mayors +/–	▲18	▼33	▲6
Councillors	929	770	213
Councillors +/–	▲8	▼103	▲39

Local elections were held in Portugal on 29 September 2013. The elections consisted of three types of elections in the 308 Portuguese municipalities, namely the elections for the Municipal Chambers, the elections for the Municipal Assemblies, as well as the elections for the lower-level Parish Assemblies, whose winners are elected parish presidents. The latter were held separately in the more than 3,000 parishes around the country. The number of parishes had been reduced by over 1,000 due to a local government reform undertaken by the Pedro Passos Coelho's government.

The process of submitting candidacies for these elections was marked by differences in the interpretation of the electoral law. The law prohibited a candidate, after having served for three terms, to run again for Mayor, Municipal Assemblies or Parish Assemblies. However, the law did not explicitly state whether it prohibited reelection only for the same municipality or parish, or for the same office in any municipality or parish. Candidates affected by this issue included Luís Filipe Menezes (PSD), running in Porto, and Fernando Seara (PSD/CDS–PP), who was standing in Lisbon.

This controversy ended on 5 September 2013 with the decision by Constitutional Court, which allowed mayoral candidates who had already served three consecutive terms to run for election in a different municipality. With the term limit law, 52 percent of incumbent mayors, 160 to be precise, were barred from running for another term.

The Socialist Party (PS) won the largest number of mayors in its history, surpassing its previous best result, achieved just four years earlier. It also won the largest number of mayorships of any party in the history of Portugal till that date. The PS also reconquered Coimbra and won in two large strongholds of the Social Democratic Party, Vila Real and Funchal. The Social Democratic Party (PSD) was the biggest loser of these elections, since it lost almost a third of the municipalities it controlled. However, the PSD did gain some traditionally Socialist bastions like Braga and Guarda.

The Democratic Unity Coalition increased its number of municipal chambers as well as its number of councilors by winning several chambers previously held by the Socialists, including winning back their historical stronghold of Loures. However, despite increasing their overall number of mayors, they also lost three chambers they won in 2009 to the Socialists; Chamusca, Crato, and Nisa. In Chamusca they had held the mayorship since 1979. The election was also marked by the strong performances of various independent groups, which won several cities. The most significant was the victory of independent Rui Moreira in Porto, who was supported by CDS–PP.

The CDS – People's Party broke its cycle of decline in municipal elections and won in five municipalities, four more than in 2009. On the other hand, the Left Bloc suffered a heavy defeat, losing their only city and electing fewer councilors than in 2009.

The turnout in these elections was the lowest ever, with 52.6 percent of voters casting their ballot.

== Background ==
=== Electoral system ===
All 308 municipalities are allocated a certain number of councilors to elect corresponding to the number of registered voters in a given municipality. Each party or coalition must present a list of candidates. The winner of the most voted list for the municipal council is automatically elected mayor, similar to first-past-the-post (FPTP). The lists are closed and the seats in each municipality are apportioned according to the D'Hondt method. Unlike in national legislative elections, independent lists are allowed to run.

=== By-elections (2009–2013) ===
During the normal four-year term of local governments, sixteen parishes held a by-election for parish assemblies. No municipal council by-elections were held.

== Parties ==
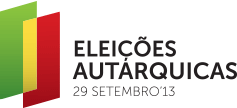
Official logo of the election.

The main political forces that contested the election were:

- Left Bloc (BE)
- CDS – People's Party (CDS–PP) (only in some municipalities)^{1}
- Unitary Democratic Coalition (CDU)
- Socialist Party (PS)
- Social Democratic Party (PSD) (only in some municipalities)^{1}

^{1} The PSD and the CDS–PP also formed coalitions in several municipalities with the Earth Party (MPT) and the People's Monarchist Party (PPM).

== Voter turnout ==
The table below shows voter turnout throughout election day.

Turnout	Time								
Turnout	12:00			16:00			19:00		
Turnout	2009	2013	±	2009	2013	±	2009	2013	±
Total	21.23%	19.44%	▼1.79 pp	45.30%	43.43%	▼1.87 pp	59.03%	52.60%	▼6.43 pp

== Results ==
=== Municipal Councils ===
==== National summary of votes and seats ====
Summary of the 29 September 2013 Municipal Councils elections results
Parties	Votes	%	±pp swing	Candidacies	Councillors		Mayors	
Parties	Votes	%	±pp swing	Candidacies	Total	±	Total	±
Socialist	1,812,029	36.26	▼1.4	302	923	▲2	149	▲17
Social Democratic	834,455	16.70	▼6.3	201	531	▼135	86	▼31
Democratic Unity Coalition	552,690	11.06	▲1.3	298	213	▲39	34	▲6
Social Democratic / People's	379,110	7.59	▼2.1	72	154	▼3	16	▼3
Independents	344,531	6.89	▲2.8	80	112	▲45	13	▲6
People's	152,073	3.04	▼0.1	150	47	▲16	5	▲4
Left Bloc	120,982	2.42	▼0.6	112	8	▼1	0	▼1
PSD / CDS–PP / MPT	100,437	2.01	▲2.0	4	11	▲2	0	0
PSD / CDS–PP / PPM	94,015	1.88	▲0.1	5	21	▲6	2	▲1
PSD / PPM	65,102	1.30	—	6	21	—	1	—
PSD / PPM / MPT	43,312	0.87	—	2	7	—	0	—
PSD/ CDS–PP / MPT / PPM	23,551	0.47	▼2.5	5	14	▼7	1	0
Portuguese Workers' Communist	23,276	0.47	▲0.3	27	0	0	0	0
PS / BE / PND / MPT / PTP / PAN	21,102	0.42	—	1	5	—	1	—
PSD / MPT / PPM	19,804	0.40	—	2	4	—	0	—
Party for Animals and Nature	16,233	0.32	—	12	0	—	0	—
CDS–PP / MPT / PPM	9,299	0.19	—	7	1	—	0	—
PSD/ CDS–PP / PPM / MPT	8,918	0.18	▼1.1	1	4	▼5	0	▼1
Labour	8,552	0.17	—	22	0	—	0	—
Earth	6,660	0.13	▼0.1	8	2	0	0	0
People's / Social Democratic	4,656	0.09	—	4	4	—	0	—
PPM / PND / PPV	3,634	0.07	—	3	0	—	0	—
National Renovator	3,002	0.06	▲0.1	6	0	0	0	0
People's / Earth	2,931	0.06	▲0.1	3	0	0	0	0
PS / PTP / PND / BE	2,157	0.04	—	1	1	—	0	—
Social Democratic / Earth	1,897	0.04	—	2	3	—	0	—
New Democracy	1,272	0.03	▼0.1	1	0	▼1	0	0
People's Monarchist / PPV	856	0.02	—	1	0	—	0	—
People's Monarchist	455	0.01	▼0.0	1	0	0	0	0
Portugal Pro-Life	338	0.01	—	1	0	—	0	—
**Total valid**	**4,657,329**	**93.18**	**▼3.8**	—	**2,086**	**▲8**	**308**	**0**
Blank ballots	193,471	3.87	▲2.2					
Invalid ballots	147,205	2.95	▲1.7					
**Total**	**4,998,005**	**100.00**						
Registered voters/turnout	9,501,103	52.60	▼6.4					

==== Municipality map ====
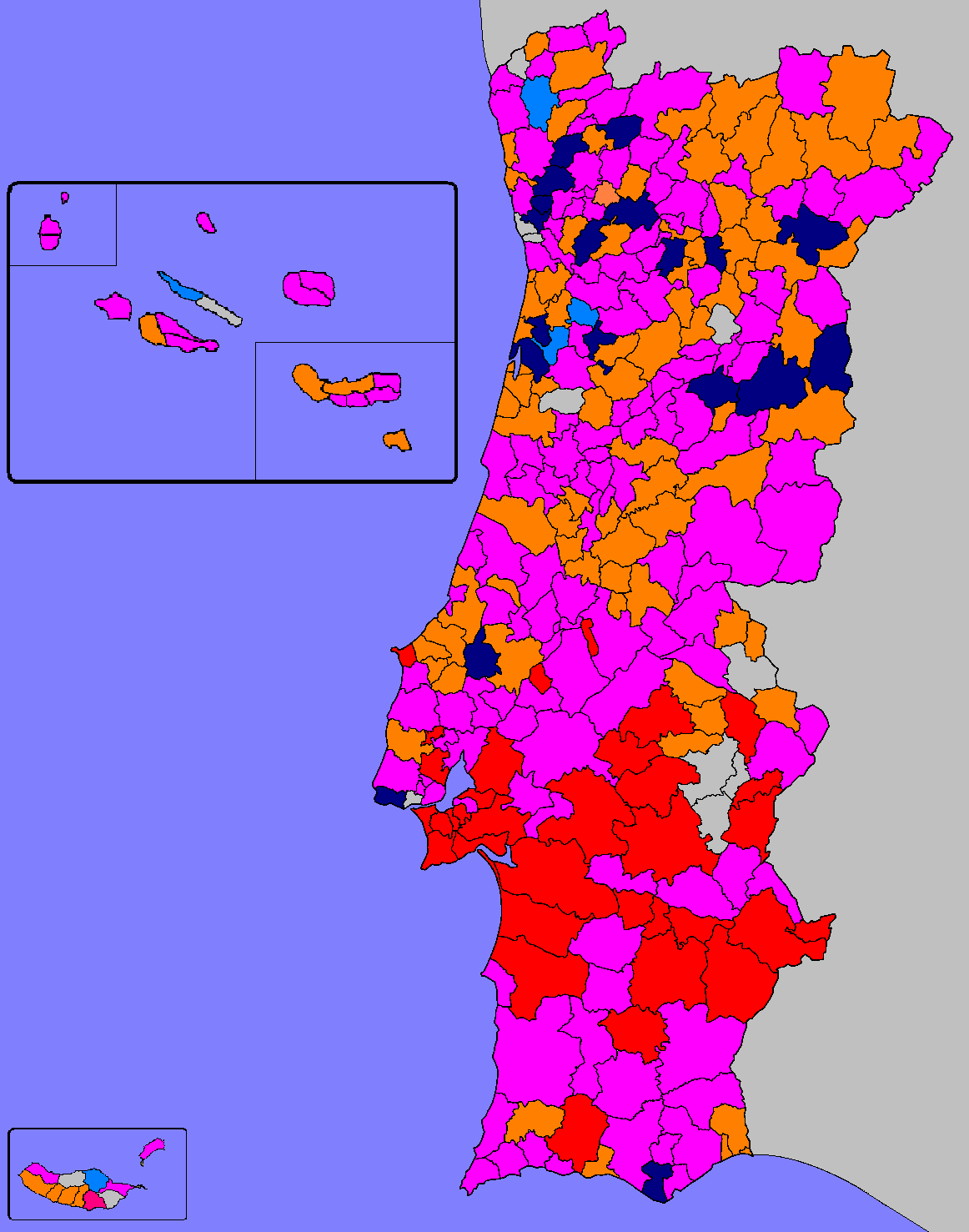
Most voted parties or coalitions in each Municipality. Municipalities won by: ■ - PS: 150 ■ - PSD: 86 ■ - CDU: 34 ■ - CDS–PP: 5 ■ - PSD coalitions: 20 ■ - Independents: 13

==== City control ====
The following table lists party control in all district capitals, highlighted in bold, as well as in municipalities above 100,000 inhabitants. Population estimates from 2013.

Municipality	Population	Previous control	New control
Almada	170,756	Unitary Democratic Coalition (CDU)	Unitary Democratic Coalition (CDU)
Amadora	175,354	Socialist Party (PS)	Socialist Party (PS)
**Aveiro**	77,229	PSD / CDS–PP	PSD / CDS–PP / PPM
Barcelos	119,563	Socialist Party (PS)	Socialist Party (PS)
**Beja**	35,024	Socialist Party (PS)	Unitary Democratic Coalition (CDU)
**Braga**	181,847	Socialist Party (PS)	PSD / CDS–PP / PPM
**Bragança**	34,681	Social Democratic Party (PSD)	Social Democratic Party (PSD)
Cascais	208,514	PSD / CDS–PP	PSD / CDS–PP
**Castelo Branco**	54,409	Socialist Party (PS)	Socialist Party (PS)
**Coimbra**	136,964	PSD / CDS–PP / PPM	Socialist Party (PS)
**Évora**	55,053	Socialist Party (PS)	Unitary Democratic Coalition (CDU)
**Faro**	61,749	PSD / CDS–PP / PPM / MPT	PSD / CDS–PP / PPM / MPT
**Funchal**	108,053	Social Democratic Party (PSD)	PS / BE / PND / MPT / PTP / PAN
Gondomar	167,525	Independent (IND)	Socialist Party (PS)
**Guarda**	40,994	Socialist Party (PS)	PSD / CDS–PP
Guimarães	156,310	Socialist Party (PS)	Socialist Party (PS)
**Leiria**	125,977	Socialist Party (PS)	Socialist Party (PS)
**Lisbon** (details)	516,815	Socialist Party (PS)	Socialist Party (PS)
Loures	203,117	Socialist Party (PS)	Unitary Democratic Coalition (CDU)
Maia	135,924	PSD / CDS–PP	PSD / CDS–PP
Matosinhos	174,690	Socialist Party (PS)	Independent (IND)
Odivelas	151,012	Socialist Party (PS)	Socialist Party (PS)
Oeiras	172,556	Independent (IND)	Independent (IND)
**Ponta Delgada**	68,768	Social Democratic Party (PSD)	Social Democratic Party (PSD)
**Portalegre**	23,915	Social Democratic Party (PSD)	Independent (IND)
**Porto** (details)	222,252	PSD / CDS–PP	Independent (IND)
**Santarém**	60,257	Social Democratic Party (PSD)	Social Democratic Party (PSD)
Santa Maria da Feira	140,038	Social Democratic Party (PSD)	Social Democratic Party (PSD)
Seixal	162,516	Unitary Democratic Coalition (CDU)	Unitary Democratic Coalition (CDU)
**Setúbal**	118,689	Unitary Democratic Coalition (CDU)	Unitary Democratic Coalition (CDU)
Sintra	379,756	PSD / CDS–PP / PPM / MPT	Socialist Party (PS)
**Viana do Castelo**	87,243	Socialist Party (PS)	Socialist Party (PS)
Vila Franca de Xira	139,110	Socialist Party (PS)	Socialist Party (PS)
Vila Nova de Famalicão	133,711	PSD / CDS–PP	PSD / CDS–PP
Vila Nova de Gaia	302,828	PSD / CDS–PP	Socialist Party (PS)
**Vila Real**	51,009	Social Democratic Party (PSD)	Socialist Party (PS)
**Viseu**	98,424	Social Democratic Party (PSD)	Social Democratic Party (PSD)

=== Municipal Assemblies ===
==== National summary of votes and seats ====
Summary of the 29 September 2013 Municipal Assemblies elections results
Parties	Votes	%	±pp swing	Candidacies	Mandates	
Parties	Votes	%	±pp swing	Candidacies	Total	±
Socialist	1,746,819	34.95	▼1.7	302	2,659	▼196
Social Democratic	813,835	16.28	▼5.9	202	1,588	▼536
Democratic Unity Coalition	599,029	11.98	▲1.4	301	747	▲96
Social Democratic / People's	376,056	7.52	▼1.8	72	493	▼29
Independents	325,724	6.52	▲2.8	74	352	▲128
People's	159,921	3.20	▼0.3	137	224	▼29
Left Bloc	157,686	3.15	▼1.0	119	100	▼39
PSD / CDS–PP / MPT	106,725	2.14	▲2.1	4	42	▲36
PSD / CDS–PP / PPM	88,393	1.77	▼0.0	5	72	▲12
PSD / PPM	60,873	1.22	—	6	57	—
PSD / PPM / MPT	41,307	0.83	—	2	18	—
Party for Animals and Nature	23,776	0.48	—	13	5	—
PSD/ CDS–PP / MPT / PPM	22,420	0.45	▼2.5	5	37	▼28
PS / BE / PND / MPT / PTP / PAN	20,849	0.42	—	1	14	—
PSD / MPT / PPM	19,850	0.40	—	2	11	—
Portuguese Workers' Communist	15,393	0.31	▲0.2	12	2	▲2
CDS–PP / MPT / PPM	9,949	0.20	—	7	9	—
PSD/ CDS–PP / PPM / MPT	8,886	0.18	▼1.0	1	10	▼12
Earth	5,525	0.11	▼0.1	7	11	▼3
People's / Social Democratic	4,647	0.09	—	3	17	—
PPM / PND / PPV	4,451	0.09	—	3	0	—
Labour	4,102	0.08	—	12	3	—
People's / Earth	3,384	0.07	▲0.1	3	3	▲3
National Renovator	3,247	0.06	▲0.1	6	0	0
PS / PTP / PND / BE	2,101	0.04	—	1	3	—
Social Democratic / Earth	2,008	0.04	—	2	8	—
New Democracy	1,505	0.03	▼0.1	1	0	▼5
People's Monarchist / PPV	1,046	0.02	—	1	0	—
People's Monarchist	445	0.01	▼0.0	1	2	▼3
**Total valid**	**4,629,952**	**92.63**	**▼4.1**	—	**6,487**	**▼459**
Blank ballots	215,489	4.31	▲2.3			
Invalid ballots	153,068	3.06	▲1.8			
**Total**	**4,998,509**	**100.00**				
Registered voters/turnout	9,501,103	52.61	▼6.4			

=== Parish Assemblies ===
==== National summary of votes and seats ====
Summary of the 29 September 2013 Parish Assemblies elections results
Parties	Votes	%	±pp swing	Candidacies	Mandates		Presidents	
Parties	Votes	%	±pp swing	Candidacies	Total	±	Total	±
Socialist	1,733,687	34.69	▼1.6	2,695	10,838	▼2,898	1,282	▼295
Social Democratic	815,086	16.31	▼6.1	1,716	6,927	▼4,186	912	▼618
Democratic Unity Coalition	596,324	11.93	▲1.0	1,735	1,973	▼293	170	▼43
Independents	478,273	9.57	▲3.5	888	2,978	▲305	342	▲10
Social Democratic / People's	363,145	7.27	▼1.9	588	2,096	▼815	222	▼90
People's	139,304	2.79	▲0.5	699	725	▲33	50	▼3
Left Bloc	115,191	2.30	▼0.7	364	138	▼97	0	▼4
PSD / CDS–PP / MPT	111,571	2.23	▲2.2	85	322	▲293	18	▲16
PSD / CDS–PP / PPM	81,096	1.62	▼0.2	125	453	▲48	44	▲8
PSD / PPM	55,186	1.10	—	68	251	—	21	—
PSD / PPM / MPT	44,661	0.89	—	25	91	—	6	—
PSD / MPT / PPM	19,908	0.40	—	16	39	—	2	—
PSD/ CDS–PP / MPT / PPM	19,397	0.39	▼2.5	30	88	▼296	3	▼28
PS / BE / PND / MPT / PTP / PAN	18,967	0.38	—	10	53	—	5	—
CDS–PP / MPT / PPM	8,966	0.18	—	39	12	—	0	—
PSD/ CDS–PP / PPM / MPT	8,344	0.17	▼0.9	12	44	▼124	2	▼13
Portuguese Workers' Communist	8,003	0.16	▲0.1	29	2	▲2	0	0
PPM / PND / PPV	4,729	0.09	—	27	0	—	0	—
Earth	4,569	0.09	▼0.1	14	18	▼29	0	▼2
People's / Social Democratic	4,303	0.09	—	22	63	—	5	—
Party for Animals and Nature	4,001	0.08	—	14	1	—	0	—
Labour	2,681	0.05	—	30	1	—	0	—
New Democracy	2,670	0.05	▲0.1	12	5	▲2	0	0
Social Democratic / Earth	2,123	0.04	—	10	27	—	1	—
PS / PTP / PND / BE	2,085	0.04	—	5	7	—	0	—
People's / Earth	1,610	0.03	▲0.0	9	4	▲1	0	0
National Renovator	716	0.01	▲0.0	10	0	0	0	0
People's Monarchist	549	0.01	0.0	7	11	▲8	0	0
Communist	57	0.00	—	1	0	—	0	—
People's Monarchist / PPV	47	0.00	—	2	0	—	0	—
**Total valid**	**4,647,249**	**92.99**	**▼3.4**	—	**27,167**	**▼7,505**	**3,085**	**▼1,022**
Blank ballots	194,978	3.90	▲1.8					
Invalid ballots	155,271	3.11	▲1.6					
**Total**	**4,997,498**	**100.00**						
Registered voters/turnout	9,500,202	52.60	▼6.4					

== See also ==
- Politics of Portugal
- List of political parties in Portugal
- Elections in Portugal
