= Bente Halkier =

Danish sociologist

Bente Halkier (born 1964) is a Danish sociologist and academic. Since 2016, she has been Professor in Sociology at the University of Copenhagen.

== Career ==
Halkier was born in 1964 and completed studied at Lancaster University in England, graduating in 1991 with an MA in contemporary sociology. Two years later, she was awarded a master's degree from Århus University. She was then a research assistant and teaching assistant at Roskilde University until she commenced doctoral studies there in 1995; her PhD was awarded in 1998 and she then spent two years as a postdoctoral researcher at Århus University and Roskilde University. From 2000 to 2011, she was an associate professor in sociology of knowledge at Roskilde, where she was Professor in Communication Theory and Methods from 2011 to 2016. Since 2016, she has been Professor in Sociology at the University of Copenhagen.

== Publications ==
- Miljø til Daglig Brug? Forbrugeres Erfaringer med Miljøhensyn i Hverdagen [English: Environment for Daily Use? Consumer Experiences with Environmental Consideration in Everyday Life] (Forlaget Sociologi, 1999).
- Fokusgrupper [English: Focus Groups] (Samfundslitteratur, 2002; 2nd ed., 2008).
- Consumption Challenged: Food in Medialised Everyday Lives (Ashgate, 2010).
