= Jean LaBanta =

- Born: c. 1879; United States
- Other name: Clyde Kaufman
- Occupations: Forger, train robber
- Status: Paroled in 1913; Paroled in 1926
- Convictions: Grand larceny (1911); Armed robbery (1914)
- Penalty: 2 years imprisonment 25 years imprisonment

Jean LaBanta (born c. 1879) was an American criminal, forger and train robber. He was a notorious conman and check forger in California during the early 20th century. Between 1913 and 1914, he passed out an estimated $40,000 in rubber checks and was also responsible for a series of train robberies against the Southern Pacific Railroad. It was partly due to his robberies that the railroad company first began arming its guards.

== Biography ==
Born around 1879, little is known about Jean LaBanta's early life. In April 1911, he was convicted of grand larceny in San Benito County, California, and sentenced to 2 years imprisonment at San Quentin. He received an early parole in 1913 and was soon being investigated by authorities in several California counties for writing rubber checks. Placer County was the first to issue a warrant on LaBanta, then under his alias Clyde Kaufman, for forging $65 checks. Investigators would discover that LaBanta had passed out an estimated $40,000 in fraudulent checks.

During this time, LaBanta also robbed several express trains belonging to the Southern Pacific Railroad. His first attempt occurred on October 14, 1913, when he donned a mask and boarded Southern Pacific Train No. 23 during a mail exchange at Burlingame. Reaching the express car, he put sacks on the heads of two guards at gunpoint and forced them to sit in a corner while the train continued on to San Francisco. LaBanta jumped off the train at some point, though the guards did not see him, and escaped with $100. Despite the small reward for a high-risk venture, LaBanta tried again a month later. On November 17, he snuck on board Southern Pacific Train No. 77 and again forced hoods on the clerks at gunpoint while he searched through the mail. After gathering another small score, he jumped off the train before pulling into Burlingame. As a result of the robberies, the Southern Pacific Railroad ordered that all express guards on the northern California runs would be armed.

LaBanta moved to Los Angeles following Southern Pacific's announcement. He soon found an accomplice, Jean Dolly (aka "Jim Barry"), who had been recently paroled from San Quentin after serving 18 months for forgery. On January 10, 1914, the two men jumped on Southern Pacific Train No. 9, two minutes before its scheduled departure from Los Angeles at 10:15 am. They held up the mail car, unmasked this time, and stole $600 before jumping out shortly before the train's arrival in Burbank.

The law eventually caught up to LaBanta and took him into custody at a San Francisco hotel on January 20, 1914. After a lengthy interrogation, LaBanta also confessed to the train robberies as well quietly bragging to investigators that he was the perpetrator of "much more classier crimes" than bouncing checks. Dolly was quickly arrested after being identified by mail clerks and was indicted with LaBanta by a federal grand jury on February 10. His accomplice pleaded guilty on March 6 and was sentenced to San Quintin for 5 years while LaBanta, who pleaded guilty the day after his indictment, was sentenced to 54 years. This was reduced to 25 when the judge made the sentences concurrent. LaBanta was paroled on September 24, 1926, and disappeared from public record thereafter.
