= Vila Nova de Famalicão =

- Municipality
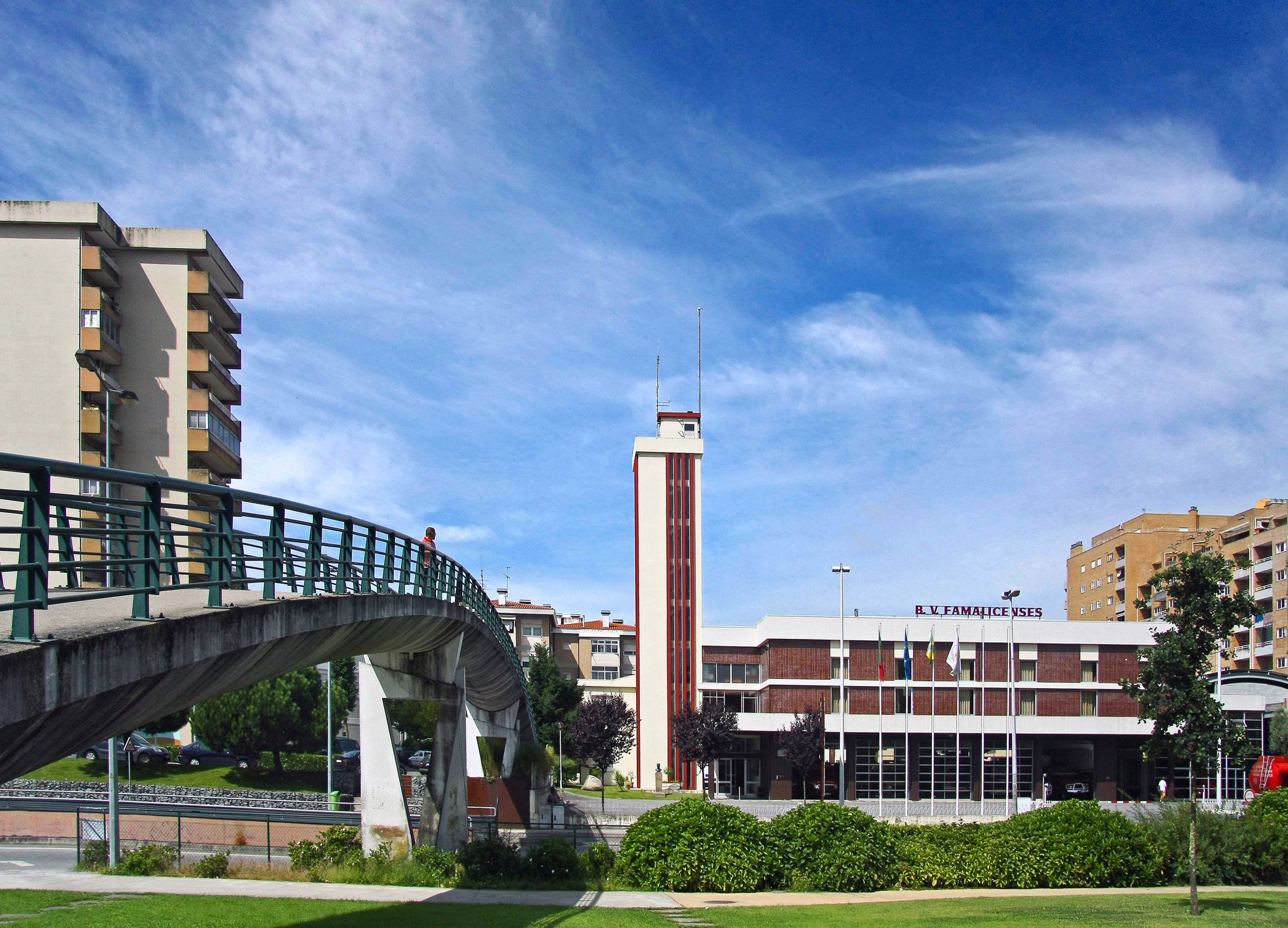

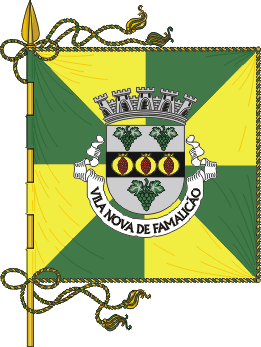
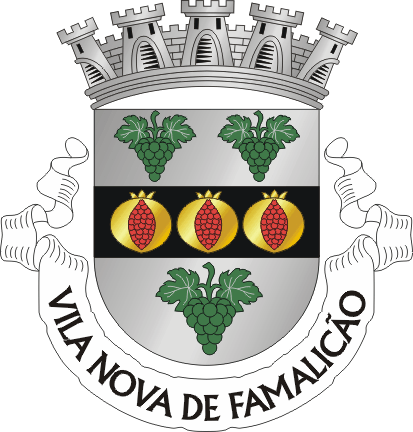
- Flag Coat of arms
- Interactive map of Vila Nova de Famalicão
- Coordinates: 41°24′N 8°31′W
- Country: Portugal
- Region: Norte
- Intermunic. comm.: Ave
- District: Braga
- Parishes: 34

Government
  - President: Mário Passos (PSD-CDS–PP)

Area
  - Total: 201.59 km^{2} (77.83 sq mi)

Population (2025)
  - Total: 143,801
  - Density: 713.33/km^{2} (1,847.5/sq mi)
- Time zone: UTC+00:00 (WET)
  - Summer (DST): UTC+01:00 (WEST)
- Website: www.vilanovadefamalicao.org

Vila Nova de Famalicão (Portuguese pronunciation: [ˈvilɐ ˈnɔvɐ ðɨ fɐmɐliˈkɐ̃w]), also known as Famalicão, is a Portuguese town in the Braga District and the sub-region of Vale do Ave. The population of Vila Nova was created in 1205 with the charter given by the King Sancho I. The municipality was created in 1835 as a detachment from Barcelos and was elevated to the category of “Vila” with the charter given by the Queen D. Maria II. In 1985, approved by National Assembly, Vila Nova de Famalicão was elevated to the category of "city". The inhabitants of Famalicão are called Famalicenses.

The city is the south entrance of the Minho province and the last reference of the Minho province for whoever comes from the North of Portugal and the Spanish region of Galicia. Since ancestral times, its privileged location has been a motivation for the passage and fixation of other people who left marks of their ways and culture in the territory, still easily found nowadays. The municipality is bordered by Braga to the north, by Guimarães to the east, by Santo Tirso and Trofa to the south, by Vila do Conde and Póvoa de Varzim to the west and by Barcelos to the northwest. Due to its privileged location, Famalicão is currently served by a network of modern roads, with one of the most important motorway junctions of the country – A3 (Porto – Vigo) and A7 (Guimarães – Póvoa de Varzim), as well as a train service with direct connections to Braga, Guimarães, Porto, Vigo, Coimbra, Lisbon and Algarve.

Because of this strategic positioning, Famalicão is today mentioned as one of the main cultural, commercial and industrial centres of the country. The strength of its diverse industry and socio-economic dynamics are prominent features at national and international level. Vila Nova de Famalicão hosts the headquarters of some of the largest and best companies in the country in various industry sectors, with its maximum strength in the textile and clothing, automotive, agrofood and metal-mechanics sectors, giving it the 3rd place in the most exporting municipalities of the country and one of the major industrial economies in the North.

Land of the writer Camilo Castelo Branco, whose house-museum is part of a network of 13 museums, which includes the Portuguese Centre of Surrealism, the National Railway Museum – Lousado Museum Centre, and the Textile Industry Museum – Ave Basin.

== History ==
The historical remains on the origin of the settlement of this land, takes us to the Iron Age, more properly to archaeological remains of hillforts throughout the county.

Castro do Monte das Ermidas, perhaps founded in the 4th century BC, Castro de São Miguel-o-Anjo or Castro de Eiras, are some of the archaeological remains of remote settlements that the county has. The Pedra Formosa do Castro de Eiras, which belonged to a bathing complex, was discovered in 1880 and, according to archaeologists, it dates from the first millennium BC.

=== The 1205's foral ===
D. Sancho I was forever remembered as the settler, king who sponsored the creation of settlements throughout the country, with a view to making Portugal a strong and dispersed kingdom, thus populating remote areas of the kingdom.

On 1 July 1205 King D. Sancho I of Portugal, who had a reguengo (land that belonged to the King) in Vila Nova, created a foral to 40 inhabitants of that land, giving authorization for them to deal with his reguengo, on which all the profits that the 40 settlers obtained in that piece of land would be perpetually theirs, by hereditary right, and could sell to whomever they wanted. Thus, the history of the village began from that moment.

In that same foral, the king orders the village to hold a biweekly fair, a tradition that still happens weekly.

=== The Municipality ===
Vila de Famalicão, as the head of the Judge of Vermoim, began to appreciate over the years, and so much so that in 1706 it counted 100 natural inhabitants of the land. Showing his yearnings for better progress, in 1734 and 1735, he insisted with Barcelos, asking for benefits, as to signifying the care of new progressive intentions. Continuing to boil interest in local development. In 1825, he decidedly asked Vila de Barcelos to create his own municipality, which he was unable to obtain.

Finally, ten years later and with the creation of the new Judicial Division of the Kingdom of Portugal on 21 March 1835, the municipality of Vila Nova de Famalicão was formed by the order of Queen D. Maria II.

== Geography ==
Vila Nova de Famalicão is located in the province of Minho, in the district and archdiocese of Braga, is the seat of the municipality and county, and is on flat ground at an altitude of 88 meters.

Famalicão is a tourist destination in Northern Portugal, enjoying a strategic location with fast links to the cities of Braga, Porto, Guimarães, Viana do Castelo, Barcelos, Santo Tirso and Vigo.

The city is 30 minutes from the international airport Francisco Sá Carneiro and the Leixões maritime port, crossed by highways, national roads and railways that unite the main urban centres of the North of Portugal and Europe.

The Vila Nova de Famalicão region has a Csb Mediterranean climate.

== Parishes ==
Administratively, the municipality is divided into 34 civil parishes (freguesias):

- Antas e Abade de Vermoim
- Arnoso (Santa Maria e Santa Eulália) e Sezures
- Avidos e Lagoa
- Bairro
- Brufe
- Carreira e Bente
- Castelões
- Cruz
- Delães
- Esmeriz e Cabeçudos
- Fradelos
- Gavião
- Gondifelos, Cavalões e Outiz
- Joane
- Landim
- Lemenhe, Mouquim e Jesufrei
- Louro
- Lousado
- Mogege
- Nine
- Pedome
- Pousada de Saramagos
- Requião
- Riba de Ave
- Ribeirão
- Ruivães e Novais
- Santa Maria de Oliveira
- São Martinho do Vale
- São Mateus de Oliveira
- Seide
- Vale (São Cosme), Telhado e Portela
- Vermoim
- Vila Nova de Famalicão e Calendário
- Vilarinho das Cambas

== Economy ==
The economy of the municipality is mainly based on textile, automotive, metal-mechanic and agrofood industries, hosting the headquarters or branches of some large companies, such as Continental Mabor, Leica, Riopele, Vieira de Castro, and Primor.

== International relations ==
- Saint-Fargeau-Ponthierry, France, since 1989
- Givors, France, since 1992
- Caruaru, Brazil, since 1999
- São Vicente, Cape Verde, since 2000
- Lobata District, São Tomé and Príncipe, since 2013
- Mocuba, Mozambique, since 2012
- Arteixo, Spain, since 2016

== Notable people ==
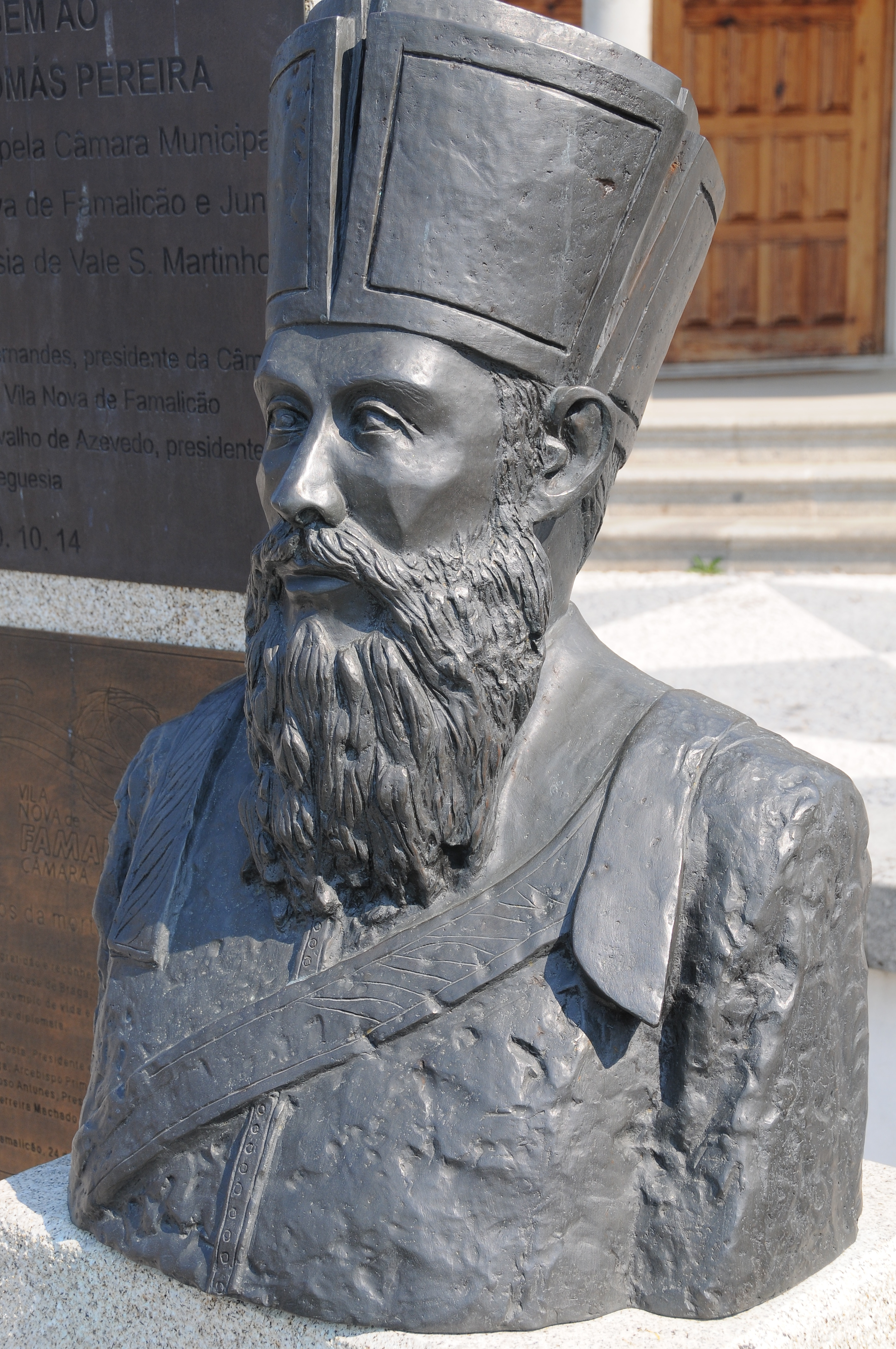
bust of Thomas Pereira

- Thomas Pereira (1645–1708) a Jesuit, mathematician, scientist and missionary in Qing China.
- Manuel Gonçalves Cerejeira (1888–1977) a cardinal and Patriarch of Lisbon 1929 to 1971.
- Delfim Ferreira (1888-1960) an entrepreneur and reputed richest man in Portugal.
- Cupertino de Miranda, (PT Wiki) (1892-1988), banker, founded the local Centre of Surrealism.
- Jorge Ortiga (born 1944), Archbishop-Primate of Braga
- Mesquita Machado (born 1947) a former politician & mayor of Braga from 1976 to 2013.
- Nuno Melo (born 1966), lawyer and politician
- Jorge Moreira da Silva (born 1971) a politician and expert on climate change, carbon finance and energy policy.

=== Sport ===
- Vítor Paneira (born 1966) a former footballer with 457 club caps and 44 for Portugal
- Joaquim Manuel Sampaio da Silva (born 1975), known as Quim a former footballer with 562 club caps and 32 for Portugal
- João Pedro (born 1980) a former footballer with over 360 club caps
- Tiago Machado (born 1985), professional cyclist and former Portuguese national time trial champion
- Bruno Moreira (born 1987) a footballer with over 350 club caps
- João Carlos Araújo Fonseca Silva (born 1989), known as Talocha, is a footballer with over 350 club caps
