= Arez e Amieira do Tejo =

- Civil parish
- Location in Portugal
- Coordinates: 39.48°N 7.73°W
- Country: Portugal
- Region: Alentejo
- Intermunic. comm.: Alto Alentejo
- District: Portalegre
- Municipality: Nisa

Area
  - Total: 158.23 km^{2} (61.09 sq mi)

Population (2011)
  - Total: 497
  - Density: 3.1/km^{2} (8.1/sq mi)
- Time zone: UTC+00:00 (WET)
  - Summer (DST): UTC+01:00 (WEST)

Arez e Amieira do Tejo is a civil parish in the municipality of Nisa, Portugal. It was formed in 2013 by the merger of the former parishes Arez and Amieira do Tejo. The population in 2011 was 497, in an area of 158.23 km^{2}.
