= Alpalhão =

- Civil parish
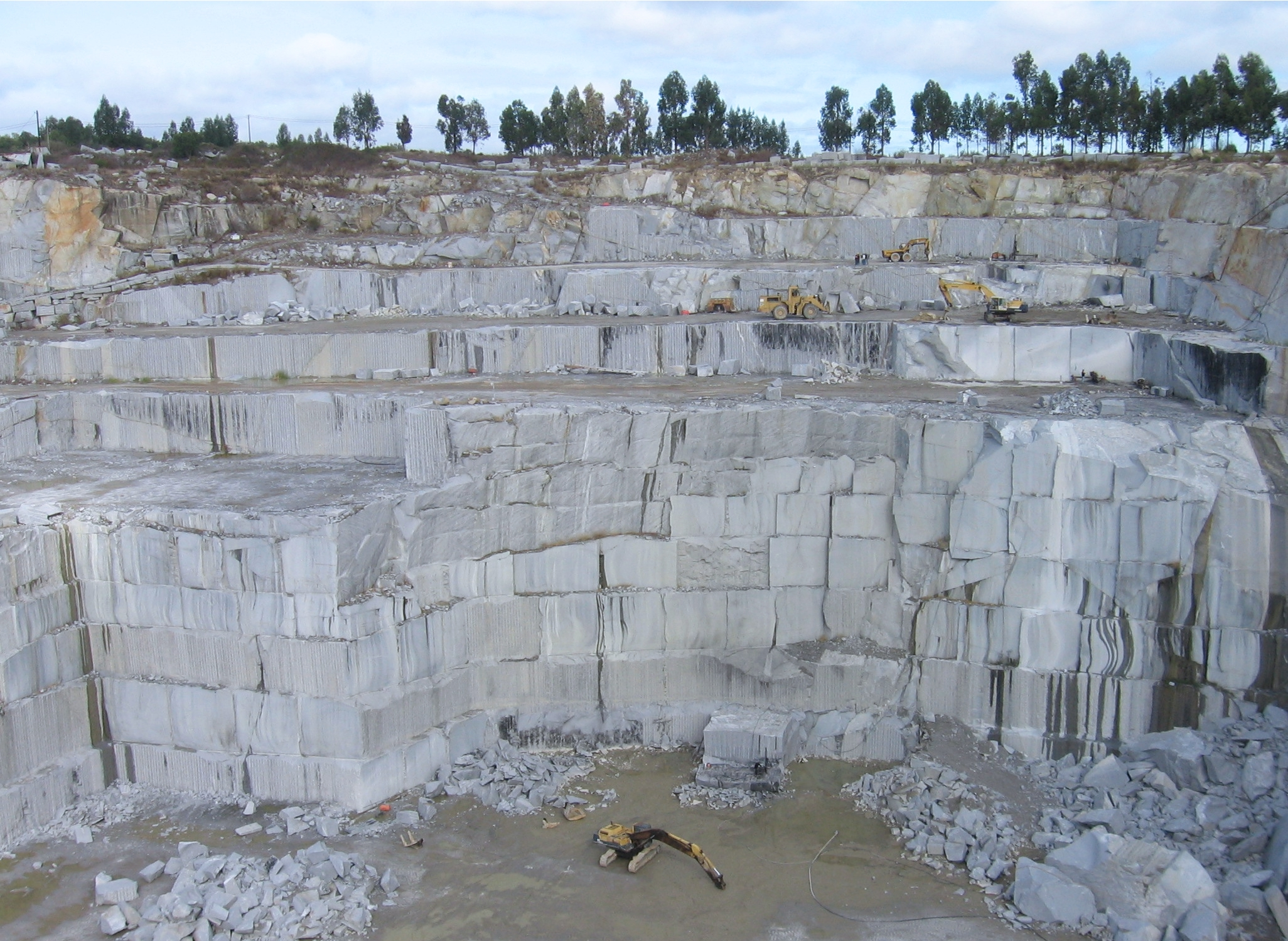
- Alpalhão Granite Quarry

- Location in Portugal
- Coordinates: 39°25′0″N 7°37′8″W
- Country: Portugal
- Region: Alentejo
- Intermunic. comm.: Alto Alentejo
- District: Portalegre
- Municipality: Nisa

Area
  - Total: 34.16 km^{2} (13.19 sq mi)

Population (2011)
  - Total: 1,238
  - Density: 36.24/km^{2} (93.86/sq mi)
- Time zone: UTC+00:00 (WET)
  - Summer (DST): UTC+01:00 (WEST)

Alpalhão is a civil parish in the municipality of Nisa, Portugal. The population in 2011 was 1,238, in an area of 34.16 km^{2}.
