= Nisa, Portugal =

Nisa
- Municipality
- Notable Town of Nisa
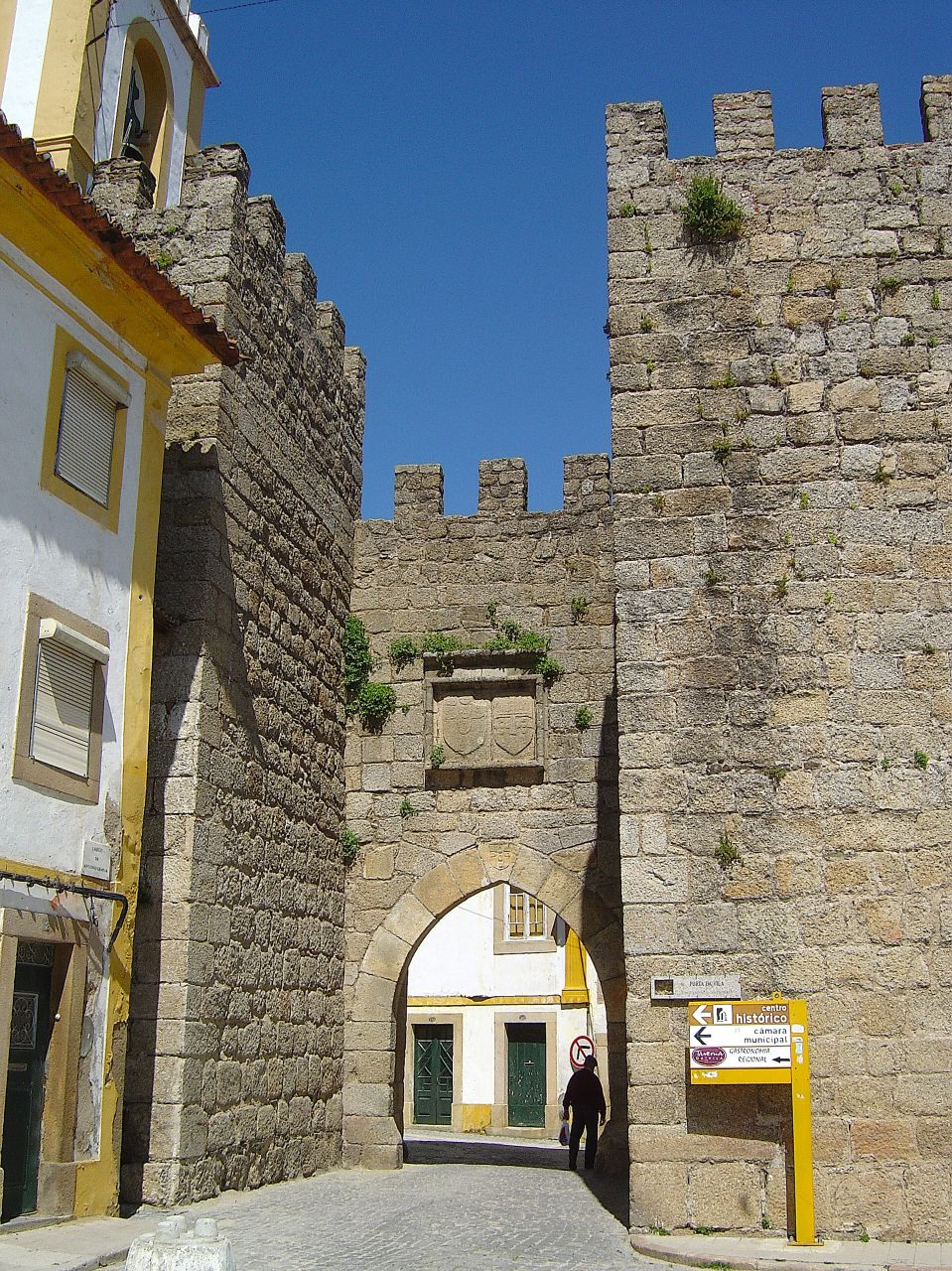

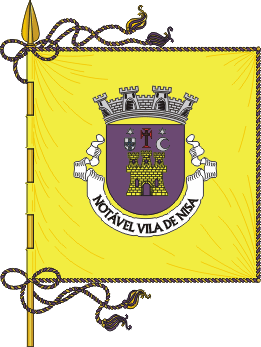
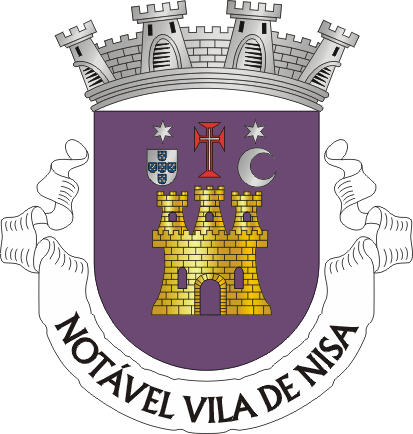
- Flag Coat of arms
- Interactive map of Nisa
- Coordinates: 39°30′N 7°38′W
- Country: Portugal
- Region: Alentejo
- Intermunic. comm.: Alto Alentejo
- District: Portalegre
- Seat: Nisa Municipal Chamber
- Parishes: 7

Government
  - President: José Dinis Samarra Serra (PS)

Area
  - Total: 575.68 km^{2} (222.27 sq mi)

Population (2011)
  - Total: 7,450
  - Density: 12.9/km^{2} (33.5/sq mi)
- Time zone: UTC+00:00 (WET)
  - Summer (DST): UTC+01:00 (WEST)
- Local holiday: Easter Monday (date varies)
- Website: http://www.cm-nisa.pt

Nisa, (Note: Portuguese pronunciation: [ˈnizɐ]) officially the Notable Town of Nisa, is a municipality in Portalegre District in Portugal. The population in 2011 was 7,450, in an area of 575.68 km^{2}.

The present Mayor is José Dinis Samarra Serra (PS - Partido Socialista). The municipal holiday is Easter Monday.

In addition, it lends its name to Queijo de Nisa, a Portuguese sheep cheese with a protected designation of origin (PDO).

== Parishes ==
Administratively, the municipality is divided into 7 civil parishes (freguesias):

- Alpalhão
- Arez e Amieira do Tejo
- Espírito Santo, Nossa Senhora da Graça e São Simão
- Montalvão
- Santana
- São Matias
- Tolosa

== Notable people ==
- Álvaro Semedo (ca.1585 - 1658) a Portuguese Jesuit priest and missionary in China.
