= List of Portuguese municipalities by population =

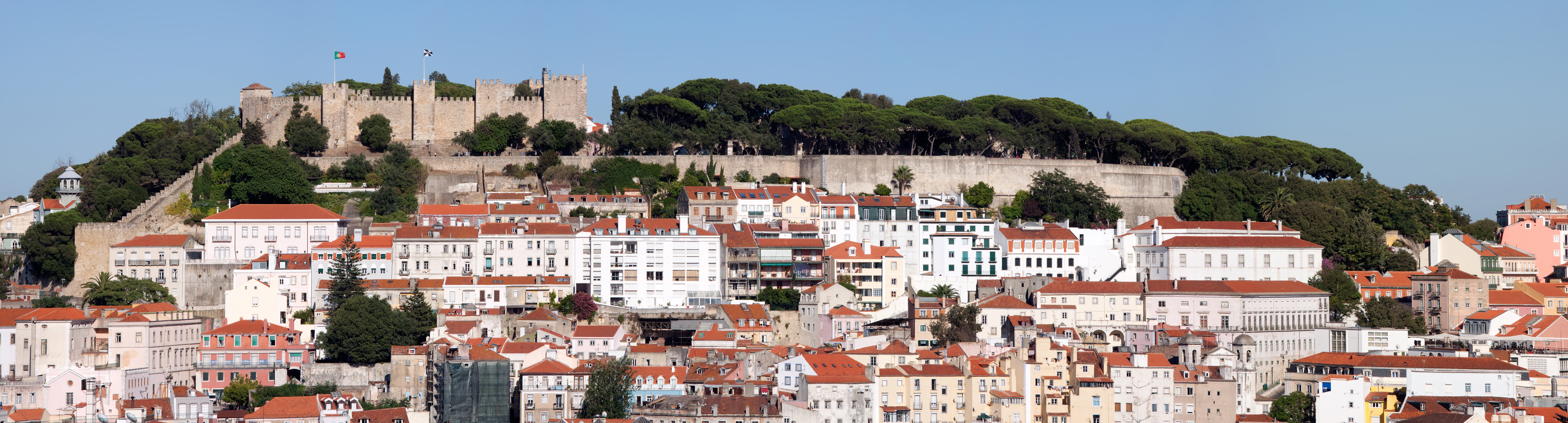
São Jorge Castle and the surrounding areas of Castelo and Alfama in Lisbon, Portugal's capital and largest city

This is a list of Portugal's municipalities by population, according to the estimate of the resident population for the Census 2021 made by the National Statistics Institute (INE).

The 308 Portuguese municipalities are divided among the 25 sub-regions and the 7 national regions, the population density of each municipality, and the area it totals.

About 64.88% of the national population, 6,760,989 inhabitants, live in the 56 municipalities with more than 50,000 inhabitants, about 18.2% of all national municipalities. While there are 122 municipalities, about 39.6% of all national municipalities, with a population of less than 10,000 inhabitants, a total of 678,855 inhabitants, about 6.51% of the national population.

Position	Municipality	Subregion	Region	Population	Population/km^{2}
1	Lisbon	Lisbon metropolitan area	Lisbon metropolitan area	544851	6425,1
2	Sintra	Lisbon metropolitan area	Lisbon metropolitan area	385954	1209,1
3	Vila Nova de Gaia	Porto metropolitan area	North	304149	1802,9
4	Porto	Porto metropolitan area	North	231962	5616,5
5	Cascais	Lisbon metropolitan area	Lisbon metropolitan area	214134	2198,5
6	Loures	Lisbon metropolitan area	Lisbon metropolitan area	201646	1191,1
7	Braga	Cávado	North	193333	1055,3
8	Almada	Lisbon metropolitan area	Lisbon metropolitan area	177400	2527,1
9	Matosinhos	Porto metropolitan area	North	172669	2776,0
10	Oeiras	Lisbon metropolitan area	Lisbon metropolitan area	171802	3759,3
11	Amadora	Lisbon metropolitan area	Lisbon metropolitan area	171719	7215,1
12	Seixal	Lisbon metropolitan area	Lisbon metropolitan area	166693	1745,5
13	Gondomar	Porto metropolitan area	North	164255	1245,3
14	Guimarães	Ave	North	156852	650,0
15	Odivelas	Lisbon metropolitan area	Lisbon metropolitan area	148156	5612,0
16	Coimbra	Region Coimbra	Central	140796	440,8
17	Vila Franca de Xira	Lisbon metropolitan area	Lisbon metropolitan area	137659	433,3
18	Santa Maria da Feira	Porto metropolitan area	North	136720	635,6
19	Maia	Porto metropolitan area	North	134959	1624,1
20	Vila Nova de Famalicão	Cávado	North	133590	662,3
21	Leiria	Region Leiria	Central	128640	227,4
22	Setúbal	Lisbon metropolitan area	Lisbon metropolitan area	123684	719,5
23	Barcelos	Cávado	North	116777	308,2
24	Funchal	Madeira	Madeira	105919	1399,2
25	Viseu	Viseu Dão-Lafões	Central	99693	196,6
26	Valongo	Porto metropolitan area	North	94795	1262,3
27	Mafra	Lisbon metropolitan area	Lisbon metropolitan area	86523	296,6
28	Viana do Castelo	High Minho	North	85864	269,5
29	Paredes	Porto metropolitan area	North	84414	538,4
30	Torres Vedras	West	Central	83130	204,2
31	Vila do Conde	Porto metropolitan area	North	80921	543,1
32	Aveiro	Region Aveiro	Central	80880	404,6
33	Barreiro	Lisbon metropolitan area	Lisbon metropolitan area	78362	2464,2
34	Loulé	Algarve	Algarve	72373	94,7
35	Penafiel	Tâmega and Sousa	North	69687	328,2
36	Palmela	Lisbon metropolitan area	Lisbon metropolitan area	68879	148,8
37	Santo Tirso	Porto metropolitan area	North	67785	496,6
38	Faro	Algarve	Algarve	67566	335,1
39	Ponta Delgada	Azores	Azores	67287	288,8
40	Moita	Lisbon metropolitan area	Lisbon metropolitan area	66326	1199,4
41	Oliveira de Azeméis	Porto metropolitan area	North	66212	405,0
42	Póvoa de Varzim	Porto metropolitan area	North	64320	783,4
43	Portimão	Algarve	Algarve	59896	328,9
44	Figueira da Foz	Region Coimbra	Central	58982	155,6
45	Santarém	Lezíria do Tejo	Alentejo	58770	104,9
46	Felgueiras	Tâmega and Sousa	North	55883	483,0
47	Montijo	Lisbon metropolitan area	Lisbon metropolitan area	55732	160,1
48	Paços de Ferreira	Tâmega and Sousa	North	55623	783,4
49	Alcobaça	West	Central	54981	134,7
50	Ovar	Region Aveiro	Central	54976	373,0
51	Évora	Central Alentejo	Alentejo	53568	41,0
52	Sesimbra	Lisbon metropolitan area	Lisbon metropolitan area	52465	269,1
53	Castelo Branco	Beira Baixa	Central	52272	36,3
54	Amarante	Tâmega and Sousa	North	52131	172,9
55	Pombal	Region Leiria	Central	51178	81,7
56	Caldas da Rainha	West	Central	50898	199,1
57	Vila Real	Douro	North	49623	131,0
58	Marco de Canaveses	Tâmega and Sousa	North	49563	245,5
59	Fafe	Ave	North	48502	221,4
60	Lousada	Tâmega and Sousa	North	47401	493,8
61	Vila Verde	Cávado	North	46474	203,2
62	Covilhã	Beiras and Serra da Estrela	Central	46453	83,6
63	Águeda	Region Aveiro	Central	46134	137,6
64	Olhão	Algarve	Algarve	44639	341,0
65	Ourém	Medium Tejo	Central	44576	107,0
66	Alenquer	West	Central	44428	146,0
67	Albufeira	Algarve	Algarve	44158	314,1
68	Santa Cruz	Madeira	Madeira	42262	621,5
69	Ponte de Lima	High Minho	North	41204	128,6
70	Guarda	Beiras and Serra da Estrela	Central	40155	56,4
71	Ílhavo	Region Aveiro	Central	39241	533,9
72	Marinha Grande	Region Leiria	Central	39033	208,6
73	Trofa	Porto metropolitan area	North	38612	537,0
74	Silves	Algarve	Algarve	37813	55,6
75	Chaves	High Tâmega	North	37623	63,6
76	Tomar	Medium Tejo	Central	36444	103,8
77	Esposende	Cávado	North	35145	368,4
78	Bragança	Lands of Trás-os-Montes	North	34580	29,5
79	Abrantes	Medium Tejo	Central	34351	48,1
80	Cantanhede	Region Coimbra	Central	34218	87,5
81	Torres Novas	Medium Tejo	Central	34149	126,5
82	Angra do Heroísmo	Azores	Azores	33829	141,5
83	Lagos	Algarve	Algarve	33514	157,5
84	Beja	Low Alentejo	Alentejo	33401	29,1
85	Câmara de Lobos	Madeira	Madeira	32175	611,7
86	Ribeira Grande	Azores	Azores	31414	174,3
87	Espinho	Porto metropolitan area	North	31027	1470,5
88	Benavente	Lezíria do Tejo	Alentejo	29747	57,0
89	Odemira	Coastal Alentejo	Alentejo	29523	17,2
90	Santiago do Cacém	Coastal Alentejo	Alentejo	27801	26,2
91	Anadia	Region Aveiro	Central	27542	127,2
92	Tavira	Algarve	Algarve	27536	45,4
93	Fundão	Beiras and Serra da Estrela	Central	26521	37,9
94	Peniche	West	Central	26419	340,5
95	Lourinhã	West	Central	26261	178,4
96	Estarreja	Region Aveiro	Central	26229	242,0
97	Tondela	Viseu Dão-Lafões	Central	25939	69,9
98	Albergaria-a-Velha	Region Aveiro	Central	24841	159,9
99	Montemor-o-Velho	Region Coimbra	Central	24587	107,4
100	Lamego	Douro	North	24348	147,2
101	Vizela	Ave	North	23903	967,7
102	Lagoa	Algarve	Algarve	23718	268,6
103	Cartaxo	Lezíria do Tejo	Alentejo	23211	146,7
103	Porto de Mós	Region Leiria	Central	23211	88,7
105	Oliveira do Bairro	Region Aveiro	Central	23150	265,2
106	Vagos	Region Aveiro	Central	22905	134,8
107	Portalegre	High Alentejo	Alentejo	22368	50,0
108	São João da Madeira	Porto metropolitan area	North	22162	2805,3
109	Almeirim	Lezíria do Tejo	Alentejo	22033	99,2
110	Póvoa de Lanhoso	Ave	North	21787	164,4
111	Seia	Beiras and Serra da Estrela	Central	21759	49,9
112	Salvaterra de Magos	Lezíria do Tejo	Alentejo	21632	89,4
113	Azambuja	Lezíria do Tejo	Alentejo	21421	81,5
114	Mirandela	Lands of Trás-os-Montes	North	21389	32,5
115	Vale de Cambra	Porto metropolitan area	North	21279	145,2
116	Arouca	Porto metropolitan area	North	21154	64,3
117	Rio Maior	Lezíria do Tejo	Central	21021	77,1
118	Elvas	High Alentejo	Alentejo	20753	32,9
119	Arcos de Valdevez	High Minho	North	20729	46,3
120	Entroncamento	Medium Tejo	Central	20140	1470,1
121	Praia da Vitória	Azores	Azores	19482	120,8
122	Oliveira do Hospital	Region Coimbra	Central	19421	82,8
123	Mealhada	Region Coimbra	Central	19358	174,9
124	Machico	Madeira	Madeira	19167	283,5
125	Alcochete	Lisbon metropolitan area	Lisbon metropolitan area	19148	149,1
126	Vila Real de Santo António	Algarve	Algarve	18828	309,2
127	Amares	Cávado	North	18591	226,7
128	Mangualde	Viseu Dão-Lafões	Central	18294	83,4
129	Monção	High Minho	North	17829	84,4
130	Cinfães	Tâmega and Sousa	North	17747	74,2
131	Celorico de Basto	Tâmega and Sousa	North	17666	97,5
132	Baião	Tâmega and Sousa	North	17527	100,4
133	Coruche	Lezíria do Tejo	Central	17375	15,5
134	Soure	Region Coimbra	Central	17264	65,1
135	Lousã	Region Coimbra	Central	17012	122,9
136	Condeixa-a-Nova	Region Coimbra	Central	16733	120,6
137	Caminha	High Minho	North	15828	115,2
138	Montemor-o-Novo	Central Alentejo	Alentejo	15803	12,8
139	Castelo de Paiva	Tâmega and Sousa	North	15597	135,6
140	Cabeceiras de Basto	Ave	North	15566	64,4
141	Batalha	Region Leiria	Central	15553	150,6
142	Ponte de Sor	High Alentejo	Alentejo	15253	18,2
143	São Pedro do Sul	Viseu Dão-Lafões	Central	15139	43,4
144	Nazaré	West	Central	14889	180,7
145	Sertã	Medium Tejo	Central	14748	33,0
146	Valpaços	High Tâmega	North	14714	26,8
147	Peso da Régua	Douro	North	14553	153,4
148	Horta	Azores	Azores	14356	82,9
149	Macedo de Cavaleiros	Lands of Trás-os-Montes	North	14252	20,4
150	Sines	Coastal Alentejo	Alentejo	14214	70,2
151	Lagoa (Açores)	Azores	Azores	14194	311,3
152	Arruda dos Vinhos	West	Central	13983	179,3
153	Grândola	Coastal Alentejo	Alentejo	13827	17,1
154	Serpa	Low Alentejo	Alentejo	13768	12,5
155	Castro Daire	Viseu Dão-Lafões	Central	13753	36,3
156	Valença	High Minho	North	13634	116,4
157	Cadaval	West	Central	13382	76,5
158	Moura	Low Alentejo	Alentejo	13267	13,8
159	Nelas	Viseu Dão-Lafões	Central	13124	104,4
160	Penacova	Region Coimbra	Central	13119	60,5
161	Bombarral	West	Central	12743	139,6
162	Ribeira Brava	Madeira	Madeira	12696	195,6
163	Estremoz	Central Alentejo	Alentejo	12688	24,7
164	Alcanena	Medium Tejo	Central	12478	98,0
165	Gouveia	Beiras and Serra da Estrela	Central	12221	40,7
166	Mira	Region Coimbra	Central	12126	97,8
167	Miranda do Corvo	Region Coimbra	Central	12014	95,0
168	Vieira do Minho	Ave	North	11970	54,8
169	Óbidos	West	Central	11940	84,3
170	Vila Pouca de Aguiar	High Tâmega	North	11825	27,1
171	Ansião	Region Leiria	Central	11632	66,0
172	Sabugal	Beiras and Serra da Estrela	Central	11281	13,7
173	São Brás de Alportel	Algarve	Algarve	11266	73,4
174	Vendas Novas	Central Alentejo	Alentejo	11240	50,5
175	Tábua	Region Coimbra	Central	11163	55,9
176	Alcácer do Sal	Coastal Alentejo	Alentejo	11125	7,6
177	Sever do Vouga	Region Aveiro	Central	11069	85,4
178	Arganil	Region Coimbra	Central	11067	33,3
179	Ponte da Barca	High Minho	North	11058	60,7
180	Sátão	Viseu Dão-Lafões	Central	11026	54,6
181	Calheta (Madeira)	Madeira	Madeira	10913	98,9
182	Santa Comba Dão	Viseu Dão-Lafões	Central	10642	95,0
183	Sobral de Monte Agraço	West	Central	10542	202,3
184	Alijó	Douro	North	10492	35,3
185	Murtosa	Region Aveiro	Central	10488	143,1
186	Vila Franca do Campo	Azores	Azores	10326	132,4
187	Resende	Tâmega and Sousa	North	10053	81,5
188	Reguengos de Monsaraz	Central Alentejo	Alentejo	9875	21,3
189	Vouzela	Viseu Dão-Lafões	Central	9588	49,5
190	Oliveira de Frades	Viseu Dão-Lafões	Central	9510	65,4
191	Moimenta da Beira	Douro	North	9411	42,8
192	Montalegre	High Tâmega	North	9279	11,5
193	Carregal do Sal	Viseu Dão-Lafões	Central	9048	77,4
194	Mortágua	Region Coimbra	Central	8960	35,7
195	Vila Nova de Cerveira	High Minho	North	8930	82,2
196	Aljustrel	Low Alentejo	Alentejo	8879	19,4
197	Paredes de Coura	High Minho	North	8636	62,5
198	Chamusca	Lezíria do Tejo	Alentejo	8536	11,4
199	Trancoso	Beiras and Serra da Estrela	Central	8419	23,3
200	Ponta do Sol	Madeira	Madeira	8367	178,8
201	Idanha-a-Nova	Low Baixa	Central	8340	5,9
202	Mogadouro	Lands of Trás-os-Montes	North	8304	10,9
203	Pinhel	Beiras and Serra da Estrela	Central	8099	16,7
204	Campo Maior	High Alentejo	Alentejo	8045	32,6
205	Ferreira do Zêzere	Medium Tejo	Central	7803	41,0
206	Melgaço	High Minho	North	7776	32,7
207	Vinhais	Lands of Trás-os-Montes	North	7772	11,2
208	Ferreira do Alentejo	Low Alentejo	Alentejo	7676	11,8
209	Vila Viçosa	Central Alentejo	Alentejo	7385	37,9
210	Tarouca	Douro	North	7374	73,7
211	Penalva do Castelo	Viseu Dão-Lafões	Central	7340	54,7
212	Proença-a-Nova	Low Baixa	Central	7147	18,1
213	Vila Nova da Barquinha	Medium Tejo	Central	7035	141,8
214	Alpiarça	Lezíria do Tejo	Alentejo	6986	73,2
215	Castro Verde	Low Alentejo	Alentejo	6878	12,1
216	Torre de Moncorvo	Douro	North	6822	12,8
217	Vila Nova de Poiares	Region Coimbra	Central	6813	80,6
218	São João da Pesqueira	Douro	North	6780	25,5
219	Almodôvar	Low Alentejo	Alentejo	6709	8,6
220	Arraiolos	Central Alentejo	Alentejo	6606	9,7
221	Celorico da Beira	Beiras and Serra da Estrela	Central	6582	26,6
222	Santana	Madeira	Madeira	6558	48,1
223	Miranda do Douro	Lands of Trás-os-Montes	North	6466	13,3
224	Castro Marim	Algarve	Algarve	6434	21,4
225	Borba	Central Alentejo	Alentejo	6428	44,3
226	Mação	Medium Tejo	Central	6417	16,0
227	Mondim de Basto	Ave	North	6416	37,3
228	Terras de Bouro	Cávado	North	6359	22,9
229	Madalena	Azores	Azores	6332	43,0
230	Vila Nova de Foz Côa	Douro	North	6304	15,8
231	Redondo	Central Alentejo	Alentejo	6287	17,2
232	Alvaiázere	Region Leiria	Central	6227	38,8
233	Mértola	Low Alentejo	Alentejo	6205	4,8
234	Belmonte	Beiras and Serra da Estrela	Central	6204	52,2
235	Santa Marta de Penaguião	Douro	North	6104	88,1
236	Vila Flor	Lands of Trás-os-Montes	North	6064	22,8
237	Aljezur	Algarve	Algarve	6046	18,7
238	Nisa	High Alentejo	Alentejo	5951	10,3
239	Ribeira de Pena	High Tâmega	North	5887	27,1
240	Almeida	Beiras and Serra da Estrela	Central	5882	11,4
241	Povoação	Azores	Azores	5796	53,7
242	Portel	Central Alentejo	Alentejo	5745	9,6
243	Vila do Bispo	Algarve	Algarve	5722	32,0
244	Sernancelhe	Douro	North	5713	25,0
245	Armamar	Douro	North	5680	48,5
246	Sabrosa	Douro	North	5556	35,4
247	Carrazeda de Ansiães	Douro	North	5494	19,7
248	Monchique	Algarve	Algarve	5465	13,8
249	Penela	Region Coimbra	Central	5443	40,4
250	Vila do Porto	Azores	Azores	5414	55,9
251	Golegã	Lezíria do Tejo	Alentejo	5400	70,5
252	Viana do Alentejo	Central Alentejo	Alentejo	5323	13,5
253	Figueiró dos Vinhos	Region Leiria	Central	5296	30,5
254	Murça	Douro	North	5249	27,7
255	Aguiar da Beira	Viseu Dão-Lafões	Central	5228	25,3
256	Vidigueira	Low Alentejo	Alentejo	5177	16,4
257	Porto Santo	Madeira	Madeira	5158	121,7
258	Figueira de Castelo Rodrigo	Beiras and Serra da Estrela	Central	5150	10,1
259	Tabuaço	Douro	North	5039	37,6
260	Alandroal	Central Alentejo	Alentejo	5007	9,2
261	Boticas	High Tâmega	North	5002	15,5
262	Velas	Azores	Azores	4940	42,1
263	Oleiros	Low Baixa	Central	4900	10,4
264	São Vicente	Madeira	Madeira	4874	60,3
265	Ourique	Low Alentejo	Alentejo	4842	7,3
266	Penamacor	Low Baixa	Central	4764	8,4
267	Vila Nova de Paiva	Viseu Dão-Lafões	Central	4660	26,6
268	Mêda	Beiras and Serra da Estrela	Central	4632	16,2
269	Fornos de Algodres	Beiras and Serra da Estrela	Central	4398	33,4
270	Cuba	Low Alentejo	Alentejo	4374	25,4
271	Nordeste	Azores	Azores	4373	43,8
272	Sousel	High Alentejo	Alentejo	4358	15,6
273	Lajes do Pico	Azores	Azores	4342	28,0
274	Alfândega da Fé	Lands of Trás-os-Montes	North	4321	13,4
275	Vimioso	Lands of Trás-os-Montes	North	4154	8,6
276	Mora	Central Alentejo	Alentejo	4128	9,3
277	Santa Cruz da Graciosa	Azores	Azores	4095	67,5
278	Pampilhosa da Serra	Region Coimbra	Central	4067	10,3
279	Avis	High Alentejo	Alentejo	3813	6,3
280	Góis	Region Coimbra	Central	3806	14,5
281	Constância	Medium Tejo	Central	3801	47,3
282	Mesão Frio	Douro	North	3555	133,1
283	Sardoal	Medium Tejo	Central	3526	38,2
284	Calheta (Açores)	Azores	Azores	3441	27,2
285	Gavião	High Alentejo	Alentejo	3398	11,5
286	Pedrógão Grande	Region Leiria	Central	3392	26,3
287	Vila Velha de Ródão	Low Baixa	Central	3287	10,0
288	Vila de Rei	Medium Tejo	Central	3276	17,1
289	Crato	High Alentejo	Alentejo	3225	8,1
290	São Roque do Pico	Azores	Azores	3221	22,6
291	Freixo de Espada à Cinta	Douro	North	3215	13,2
292	Castelo de Vide	High Alentejo	Alentejo	3121	11,8
293	Alter do Chão	High Alentejo	Alentejo	3046	8,4
294	Marvão	High Alentejo	Alentejo	3023	19,5
295	Monforte	High Alentejo	Alentejo	2990	7,1
296	Manteigas	Beiras and Serra da Estrela	Central	2909	23,8
297	Fronteira	High Alentejo	Alentejo	2856	11,5
298	Arronches	High Alentejo	Alentejo	2789	8,9
299	Penedono	Douro	North	2731	20,4
300	Castanheira de Pera	Region Leiria	Central	2647	39,6
301	Alcoutim	Algarve	Algarve	2521	4,4
301	Porto Moniz	Madeira	Madeira	2521	30,5
303	Mourão	Central Alentejo	Alentejo	2353	8,4
304	Alvito	Low Alentejo	Alentejo	2276	8,6
305	Santa Cruz das Flores	Azores	Azores	2021	28,5
306	Barrancos	Low Alentejo	Alentejo	1435	8,5
307	Lajes das Flores	Azores	Azores	1408	20,1
308	Corvo	Azores	Azores	386	22,6

== See also ==
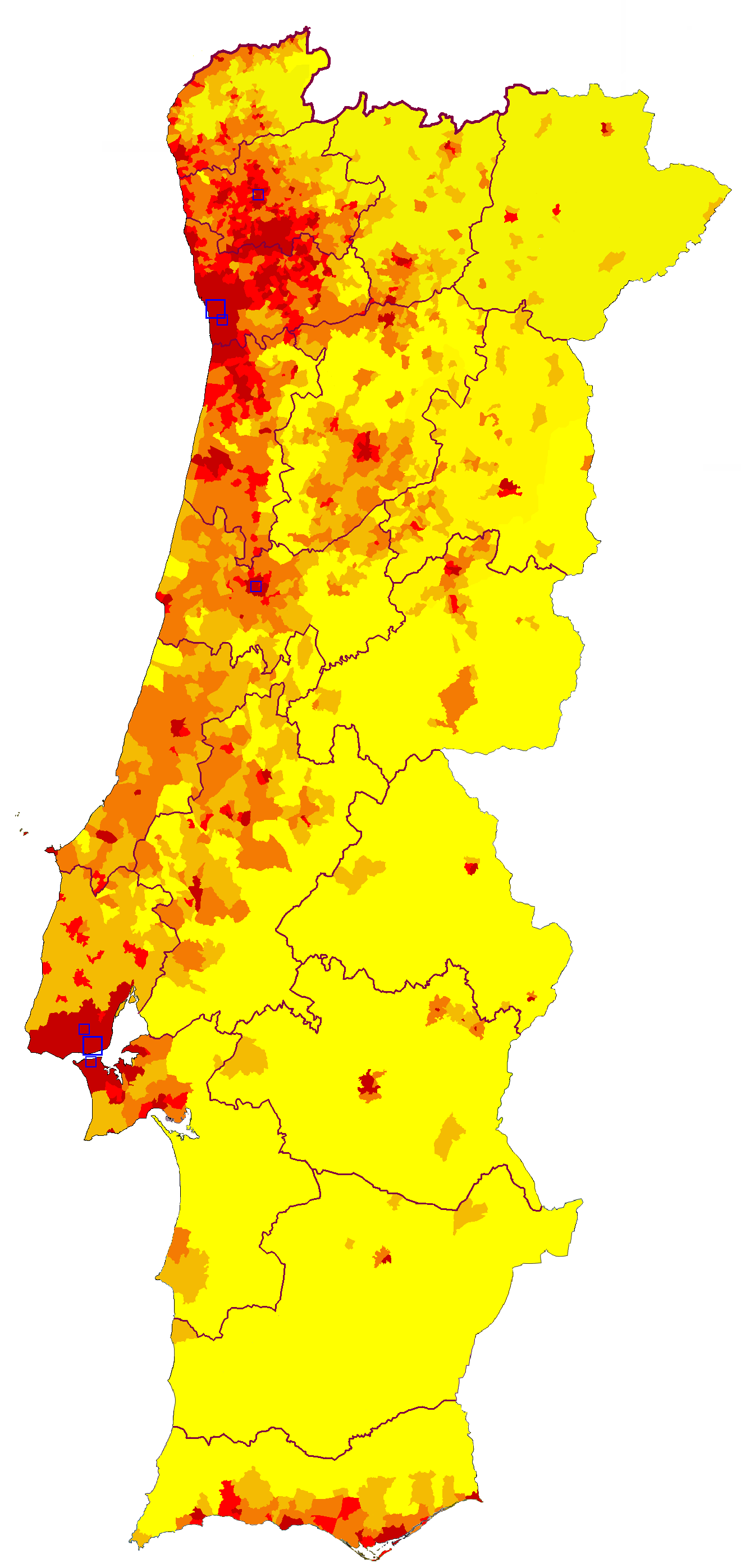
Population density of Portugal

- Subdivisions of Portugal
- List of cities in Portugal
- List of towns in Portugal
- List of municipalities of Portugal
- List of parishes of Portugal
- List of cities in Europe
