= List of municipalities of Portugal =

This is a list of the municipalities of Portugal. Portugal is divided into 18 districts (Portuguese: distritos) and 2 autonomous regions (regiões autónomas), Azores and Madeira. The districts and autonomous regions are further subdivided into 308 municipalities of Portugal (municípios or concelhos). Usually, a municipality is named after its largest or historically most important town or city. Municipalities are typically much larger than the city or town after which they are named.

== Overview of districts ==
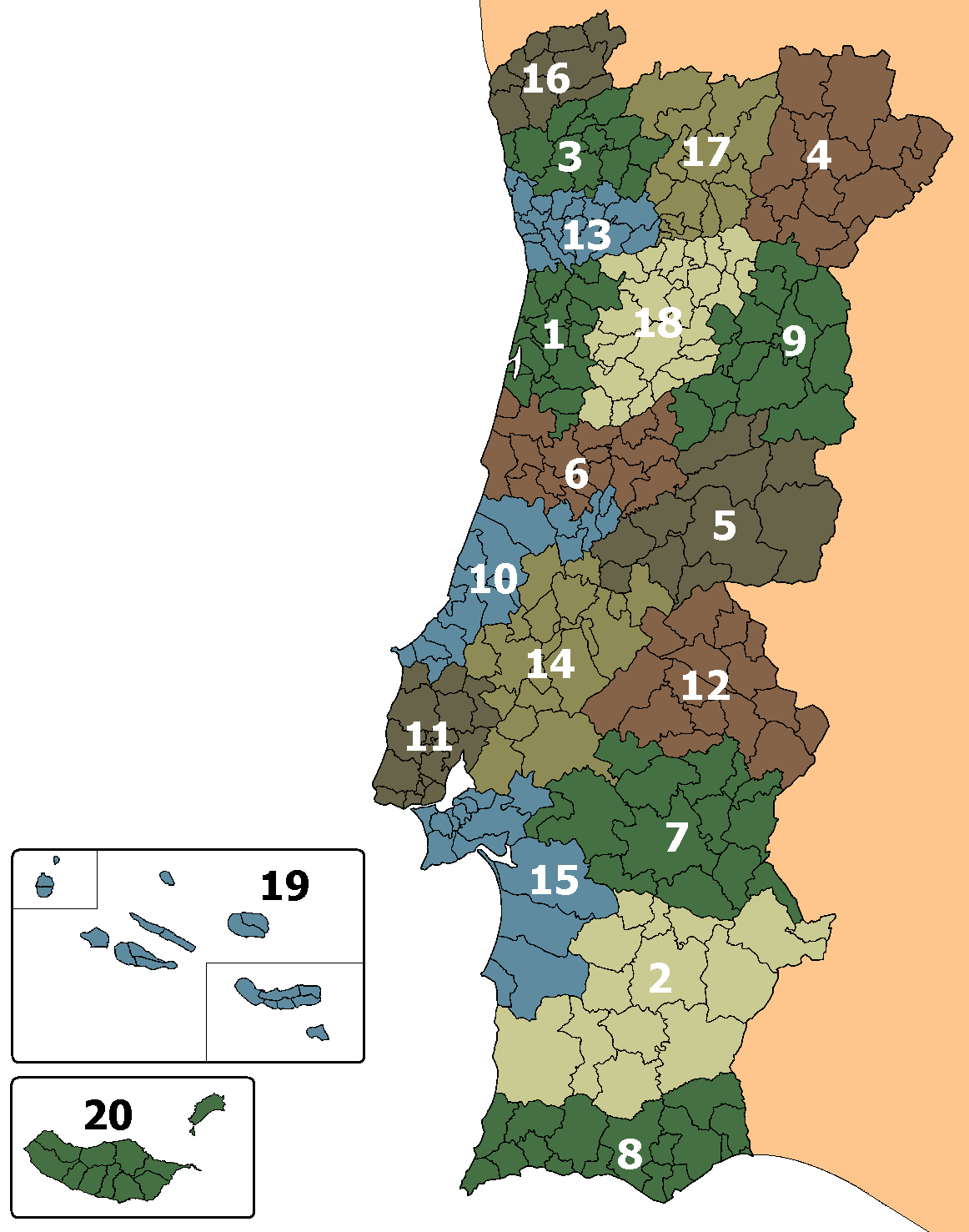
The 18 districts and 2 autonomous regions of Portugal, subdivided into municipalities.

Map key	District	Number of municipalities
1	Aveiro	19
2	Beja	14
3	Braga	14
4	Bragança	12
5	Castelo Branco	11
6	Coimbra	17
7	Évora	14
8	Faro	16
9	Guarda	14
10	Leiria	16
11	Lisbon	16
12	Portalegre	15
13	Porto	18
14	Santarém	21
15	Setúbal	13
16	Viana do Castelo	10
17	Vila Real	14
18	Viseu	24
19	Azores	19
20	Madeira	11

== List ==
Municipalities of Portugal
District / Autonomous region	Arms	Name of municipality (Note: A municipality with a bolded name indicates the district capital. In the autonomous regions of Azores and Madeira, it indicates a municipality where offices of the regional government are located.)	Area (km^{2})	Area rank (Note: A cell with a green background denotes a municipality placed within the first twenty positions of the corresponding ranking. A red background denotes a municipality placed within the last twenty positions of the corresponding ranking.)	Pop. total (2023)	Pop. rank	PD (per km^{2})	PD rank	Number of parishes	Ruling party 2025-2029 (Note: The acronyms and abbreviations in the "ruling party" field indicate the following parties or coalitions (in brackets, the number of presidencies): PS: Socialist Party (127) PSD: Social Democratic Party (76) PSD-CDS+Other minor parties (54) PSD-CDS-IL (4) PSD-IL (2) CH: Chega (3) PCP-PEV: Unitary Democratic Coalition (12) CDS: CDS - People's Party (6) NC: We, the Citizens! (2) JPP: Together for the People (1) L-PS (1) IND: Independents (20)) (Note: All mayors were elected in the Portuguese local election of 2025, held on October 12)
Aveiro		Águeda	335.3	89	47,220	64	148	91	11	PSD
Aveiro		Albergaria-a-Velha	155.4	196	25,779	98	164	83	6	CDS
Aveiro		Anadia	216.6	150	28,205	92	146	93	10	PSD-CDS
Aveiro		Arouca	329.1	92	20,916	117	73	159	16	PS
Aveiro		Aveiro	199.9	161	86,037	30	368	43	10	PSD-CDS
Aveiro		Castelo de Paiva	115.0	240	15,448	142	149	90	6	PS
Aveiro		Espinho	21.1	305	32,393	87	1,503	14	4	PSD
Aveiro		Estarreja	108.4	245	27,097	95	261	56	5	PSD-CDS
Aveiro		Ílhavo	73.5	276	42,129	69	534	33	4	PSD-CDS
Aveiro		Mealhada	110.7	242	19,787	122	194	70	6	IND
Aveiro		Murtosa	73.3	277	11,036	182	184	102	4	PSD
Aveiro		Oliveira de Azeméis	163.5	190	67,277	42	436	40	12	PS
Aveiro		Oliveira do Bairro	87.3	260	25,055	99	256	59	4	CDS
Aveiro		Ovar	147.4	201	56,735	49	385	42	5	PSD
Aveiro		Santa Maria da Feira	215.1	151	139,837	18	662	29	21	PSD
Aveiro		São João da Madeira	7.9	308	21,538	113	2,726	6	1	PSD-CDS
Aveiro		Sever do Vouga	129.6	224	10,944	183	100	127	7	PSD
Aveiro		Vagos	169.9	185	24,452	103	137	99	8	PSD
Aveiro		Vale de Cambra	146.5	204	21,251	116	169	80	7	CDS
Beja		Aljustrel	458.3	59	8,922	196	22	246	4	PCP-PEV
Beja		Almodôvar	777.9	18	6,694	221	10	301	6	PSD
Beja		Alvito	264.8	121	2,279	304	10	298	2	PS
Beja		Barrancos	168.3	188	1,430	307	11	294	1	PCP-PEV
Beja		Beja	1,147.1	9	33,838	82	30	227	12	PSD-CDS-IL
Beja		Castro Verde	569.4	40	6,965	216	14	284	4	PS
Beja		Cuba	172.1	183	4,471	269	28	236	4	PCP-PEV
Beja		Ferreira do Alentejo	648.4	31	7,912	205	13	286	4	PS
Beja		Mértola	1,292.8	6	6,137	235	6	307	7	PS
Beja		Moura	958.4	13	13,320	160	17	265	5	PS
Beja		Odemira	1,720.6	1	33,124	85	15	275	13	PS
Beja		Ourique	663.4	29	4,829	265	9	303	4	PS
Beja		Serpa	1,104.0	11	13,731	158	15	276	5	PS
Beja		Vidigueira	316.0	101	5,229	257	19	256	4	PS
Braga		Amares	82.0	267	19,578	125	235	62	16	PSD
Braga		Barcelos	378.9	80	117,005	23	327	47	61	PSD-CDS
Braga		Braga	183.2	170	201,583	7	992	22	37	PSD-CDS
Braga		Cabeceiras de Basto	241.8	132	15,560	141	74	156	12	PSD-CDS
Braga		Celorico de Basto	181.1	173	17,655	130	111	119	15	PSD
Braga		Esposende	95.4	255	37,129	76	363	44	9	IND
Braga		Fafe	219.1	146	48,514	59	244	61	25	PS
Braga		Guimarães	241.3	133	156,789	14	671	27	48	PSD-CDS
Braga		Póvoa de Lanhoso	132.5	220	22,607	110	179	77	22	PS
Braga		Terras de Bouro	277.5	114	6,388	228	29	234	14	PSD
Braga		Vieira do Minho	218.5	147	12,066	169	66	165	16	PS
Braga		Vila Nova de Famalicão	201.7	159	135,994	20	653	30	34	PSD-CDS
Braga		Vila Verde	228.7	140	48,150	62	210	66	33	PSD
Braga		Vizela	24.7	303	24,529	102	953	23	5	IND
Bragança		Alfândega da Fé	322.0	95	4,222	274	18	261	12	PS
Bragança		Bragança	1,173.6	8	35,425	78	30	230	39	PS
Bragança		Carrazeda de Ansiães	279.3	112	5,390	252	26	240	14	PSD
Bragança		Freixo de Espada à Cinta	244.0	130	3,139	293	16	267	4	PS
Bragança		Macedo de Cavaleiros	699.2	25	14,236	153	25	243	30	PSD-CDS
Bragança		Miranda do Douro	487.2	53	6,298	233	16	269	13	PSD
Bragança		Mirandela	659.0	30	21,390	115	39	209	30	PS
Bragança		Mogadouro	760.4	20	8,237	202	14	280	21	PSD
Bragança		Torre de Moncorvo	531.6	47	6,737	220	18	260	13	PSD
Bragança		Vila Flor	265.8	118	6,039	236	29	233	14	PSD-CDS
Bragança		Vimioso	481.6	55	4,176	275	11	296	10	PSD
Bragança		Vinhais	694.9	26	7,450	210	14	277	26	PS
Castelo Branco		Belmonte	118.8	234	6,216	234	64	167	4	NC
Castelo Branco		Castelo Branco	1,438.2	3	52,913	55	38	210	19	PS
Castelo Branco		Covilhã	555.6	44	46,375	66	96	131	21	PS
Castelo Branco		Fundão	700.1	24	26,981	96	45	197	23	PSD
Castelo Branco		Idanha-a-Nova	1,416.4	4	8,492	200	8	305	13	PS
Castelo Branco		Oleiros	471.1	56	4,886	263	13	285	10	PSD
Castelo Branco		Penamacor	563.9	42	4,797	266	11	293	9	PS
Castelo Branco		Proença-a-Nova	395.3	75	7,091	215	24	244	4	PS
Castelo Branco		Sertã	446.7	62	14,900	147	36	211	10	PS
Castelo Branco		Vila de Rei	191.3	166	3,442	286	18	263	3	PSD
Castelo Branco		Vila Velha de Ródão	329.9	91	3,442	287	12	292	4	PS
Coimbra		Arganil	332.8	90	11,313	176	40	208	14	PSD
Coimbra		Cantanhede	390.9	77	34,916	79	99	128	14	PSD
Coimbra		Coimbra	319.4	97	144,822	16	446	39	18	PS
Coimbra		Condeixa-a-Nova	138.7	210	17,555	131	119	112	7	IND
Coimbra		Figueira da Foz	379.1	79	60,670	46	167	82	14	PSD-CDS
Coimbra		Góis	262.3	123	3,800	281	18	262	4	PSD
Coimbra		Lousã	138.4	211	17,419	133	125	106	4	PSD-CDS
Coimbra		Mira	124.0	231	12,523	166	106	123	4	PSD
Coimbra		Miranda do Corvo	126.4	228	12,117	168	106	124	4	PSD-CDS
Coimbra		Montemor-o-Velho	229	139	24,889	101	110	121	11	PS
Coimbra		Oliveira do Hospital	234.5	137	19,464	126	93	135	16	PS
Coimbra		Pampilhosa da Serra	396.5	73	4,138	277	12	289	8	PSD
Coimbra		Penacova	216.7	149	12,919	163	78	152	8	PSD
Coimbra		Penela	134.8	216	5,611	247	48	192	4	PS
Coimbra		Soure	265.1	119	17,238	135	78	151	10	IND
Coimbra		Tábua	199.8	162	11,602	174	62	170	11	PS
Coimbra		Vila Nova de Poiares	84.5	262	7,140	214	86	140	4	IND
Évora		Alandroal	542.7	46	4,996	260	12	291	4	PS
Évora		Arraiolos	683.8	27	6,778	218	11	295	5	PCP-PEV
Évora		Borba	145.2	206	6,398	227	52	183	4	PS
Évora		Estremoz	513.8	50	12,550	165	29	232	9	PS
Évora		Évora	1,307.0	5	53,937	54	43	201	12	PS
Évora		Montemor-o-Novo	1,232.9	7	15,951	139	15	273	7	PCP-PEV
Évora		Mora	444.0	63	4,155	276	12	287	4	PCP-PEV
Évora		Mourão	278.6	113	2,424	302	12	288	3	PSD-CDS
Évora		Portel	601.2	36	5,737	242	12	290	6	PS
Évora		Redondo	365.5	83	6,299	232	19	255	2	PSD-CDS
Évora		Reguengos de Monsaraz	463.8	57	9,875	187	25	242	4	PSD
Évora		Vendas Novas	222.4	142	11,537	175	54	180	2	PSD
Évora		Viana do Alentejo	393.6	76	5,538	249	14	278	3	PCP-PEV
Évora		Vila Viçosa	194.9	164	7,300	213	45	196	4	PSD-CDS
Faro		Albufeira	140.6	209	47,524	63	251	60	4	CH
Faro		Alcoutim	575.3	39	2,413	303	6	308	4	PS
Faro		Aljezur	323.5	93	6,362	230	16	266	4	IND
Faro		Castro Marim	300.9	105	6,819	217	22	247	4	PSD
Faro		Faro	201.6	160	69,468	37	289	52	4	PS
Faro		Lagoa	88.3	259	24,918	100	257	58	4	PS
Faro		Lagos	212.8	152	34,552	81	127	103	4	PS
Faro		Loulé	764.2	19	74,410	34	82	146	9	PS
Faro		Monchique	395.3	74	5,323	253	16	268	3	PS
Faro		Olhão	130.9	223	45,043	67	323	48	4	PS
Faro		Portimão	182.1	172	63,079	43	259	57	3	PS
Faro		São Brás de Alportel	153.4	199	11,604	173	73	158	1	PS
Faro		Silves	680.0	28	39,497	74	51	185	6	PCP-PEV
Faro		Tavira	607.0	34	27,861	93	41	203	6	PS
Faro		Vila do Bispo	179.0	175	5,935	238	30	229	4	PSD
Faro		Vila Real de Santo António	60.9	289	19,314	127	298	51	3	PS
Guarda		Aguiar da Beira	206.9	155	5,302	254	30	228	10	IND
Guarda		Almeida	518.0	49	5,676	244	15	274	16	PSD
Guarda		Celorico da Beira	247.2	128	6,605	222	35	214	16	PSD
Guarda		Figueira de Castelo Rodrigo	508.6	51	5,044	259	14	283	10	PSD
Guarda		Fornos de Algodres	131.5	222	4,383	273	41	204	12	PS
Guarda		Gouveia	300.6	106	12,222	167	53	182	16	PSD
Guarda		Guarda	712.1	23	40,011	72	62	173	43	NC
Guarda		Manteigas	122.0	233	2,938	297	32	223	4	IND
Guarda		Mêda	286.1	110	4,572	268	21	250	11	PSD-CDS
Guarda		Pinhel	484.5	54	7,849	206	22	248	18	PSD
Guarda		Sabugal	822.7	15	11,270	177	17	264	30	PSD
Guarda		Seia	435.7	65	21,441	114	63	168	21	PS
Guarda		Trancoso	361.5	85	8,313	201	29	231	21	PS
Guarda		Vila Nova de Foz Côa	398.2	71	6,369	229	21	252	14	PSD
Leiria		Alcobaça	408.1	68	57,358	48	135	100	13	PSD
Leiria		Alvaiázere	160.5	192	6,355	231	51	186	5	PSD
Leiria		Ansião	176.2	176	11,865	171	78	153	6	PSD
Leiria		Batalha	103.3	247	16,565	137	150	88	4	PSD
Leiria		Bombarral	91.3	258	13,990	156	150	89	4	PS
Leiria		Caldas da Rainha	255.7	125	54,145	53	201	69	12	IND
Leiria		Castanheira de Pera	66.8	286	2,710	300	52	184	1	PS
Leiria		Figueiró dos Vinhos	173.4	180	5,270	255	41	207	4	IND
Leiria		Leiria	565.6	41	133,795	21	220	64	18	PS
Leiria		Marinha Grande	187.1	169	41,011	71	203	67	3	PS
Leiria		Nazaré	82.4	265	15,698	140	180	76	3	PSD
Leiria		Óbidos	141.6	208	13,294	161	79	149	7	PSD
Leiria		Pedrógão Grande	128.8	225	3,627	282	33	222	3	PSD
Leiria		Peniche	77.6	272	27,554	94	363	45	4	PSD
Leiria		Pombal	626.1	33	52,026	56	94	134	13	PSD
Leiria		Porto de Mós	261.6	124	23,998	106	95	132	10	PSD
Lisboa		Alenquer	304.2	103	48,319	60	141	96	11	PS
Lisboa		Amadora	23.8	304	178,253	10	7,405	1	6	PS
Lisboa		Arruda dos Vinhos	78.0	271	15,321	143	144	94	4	PS
Lisboa		Azambuja	262.7	122	22,932	108	82	145	7	PS
Lisboa		Cadaval	174.9	178	14,435	151	82	144	7	PSD
Lisboa		Cascais	97.4	250	219,636	5	1,863	10	4	PSD-CDS
Lisboa		Lisbon	84.8	261	567,131	1	6,244	2	24	PSD-CDS-IL
Lisboa		Loures	169.3	186	207,065	6	1,177	21	10	PS
Lisboa		Lourinhã	147.2	202	28,383	90	167	81	8	PSD-CDS
Lisboa		Mafra	291.7	109	90,128	27	213	65	11	IND
Lisboa		Odivelas	26.4	302	153,708	15	5,454	4	4	PS
Lisboa		Oeiras	45.7	296	175,677	11	3,687	5	5	IND
Lisboa		Sintra	319.2	98	395,528	2	1,283	18	11	PSD-IL
Lisboa		Sobral de Monte Agraço	52.1	293	11,879	170	188	74	3	PSD-CDS
Lisboa		Torres Vedras	407.1	69	88,020	28	185	75	13	PSD-CDS
Lisboa		Vila Franca de Xira	317.7	100	139,452	19	419	41	6	PS
Portalegre		Alter do Chão	362.0	84	3,180	292	10	299	4	PSD-CDS
Portalegre		Arronches	314.8	102	2,768	299	10	297	3	PSD-CDS
Portalegre		Avis	606.0	35	3,802	280	8	304	6	PCP-PEV
Portalegre		Campo Maior	247.0	129	7,916	204	34	219	3	PS
Portalegre		Castelo de Vide	264.9	120	3,197	291	14	279	4	PSD
Portalegre		Crato	398.0	72	3,275	290	10	300	4	PS
Portalegre		Elvas	631.3	32	20,412	120	36	213	7	IND
Portalegre		Fronteira	248.6	127	2,974	296	14	282	3	PSD
Portalegre		Gavião	294.6	108	3,324	289	15	271	4	PS
Portalegre		Marvão	154.9	198	3,024	294	24	245	4	PSD-CDS
Portalegre		Monforte	420.3	66	3,002	295	8	306	4	PS
Portalegre		Nisa	575.8	38	5,685	243	14	281	7	PS
Portalegre		Ponte de Sor	839.7	14	15,207	144	21	251	5	PS
Portalegre		Portalegre	447.1	61	21,914	112	55	177	7	PSD-CDS
Portalegre		Sousel	279.4	111	4,401	272	20	253	4	PS
Porto		Amarante	301.5	104	61,029	44	202	68	26	PSD-CDS
Porto		Baião	174.5	179	17,201	136	124	107	14	PSD-CDS
Porto		Felgueiras	115.7	239	55,429	52	506	36	20	L-PS
Porto		Gondomar	131.9	221	168,582	13	1,283	17	7	PS
Porto		Lousada	96.0	252	48,309	61	483	37	15	PS
Porto		Maia	83.1	263	142,594	17	1,567	13	10	PSD-CDS
Porto		Marco de Canaveses	201.9	158	49,576	58	267	55	16	PS
Porto		Matosinhos	62.2	288	179,558	9	2,708	7	4	PS
Porto		Paços de Ferreira	71.0	279	55,981	50	772	25	12	PS
Porto		Paredes	156.8	195	86,015	31	545	31	18	PS
Porto		Penafiel	212.3	153	70,320	36	340	46	28	PSD-CDS
Porto		Porto	41.3	299	248,769	4	5,786	3	7	PSD-CDS-IL
Porto		Póvoa de Varzim	82.1	266	67,525	41	797	24	7	PSD
Porto		Santo Tirso	136.5	214	67,826	40	525	34	14	PS
Porto		Trofa	71.9	278	39,997	73	545	32	5	PSD-CDS
Porto		Valongo	75.1	275	100,166	26	1,215	20	4	PS
Porto		Vila do Conde	149.0	200	84,872	32	510	35	21	PS
Porto		Vila Nova de Gaia	168.7	187	311,223	3	1,783	11	15	PSD-CDS-IL
Santarém		Abrantes	714.7	22	33,811	83	58	175	13	PS
Santarém		Alcanena	127.3	227	12,750	164	116	116	7	PSD-CDS
Santarém		Almeirim	222.1	143	22,820	109	102	126	4	PS
Santarém		Alpiarça	95.4	254	7,331	212	86	141	1	PS
Santarém		Benavente	521.5	48	32,323	88	50	188	4	PSD-CDS
Santarém		Cartaxo	158.2	193	24,359	104	155	87	6	PSD
Santarém		Chamusca	746.0	21	8,531	199	15	270	5	PS
Santarém		Constância	80.4	269	3,958	279	47	194	3	PS
Santarém		Coruche	1,117.6	10	20,629	119	18	258	6	PS
Santarém		Entroncamento	13.7	307	17,365	134	1,465	15	2	CH
Santarém		Ferreira do Zêzere	190.4	167	8,018	203	49	190	7	PS
Santarém		Golegã	76.6	273	5,442	251	73	157	3	IND
Santarém		Mação	400.0	70	6,403	226	19	254	6	PS
Santarém		Ourém	416.6	67	46,512	65	118	113	13	PSD-CDS
Santarém		Rio Maior	272.8	115	22,315	111	79	148	10	PSD-CDS
Santarém		Salvaterra de Magos	242.0	131	23,337	107	86	139	4	IND
Santarém		Santarém	560.3	43	61,009	45	114	118	18	PSD-CDS
Santarém		Sardoal	92.2	257	3,625	283	42	200	4	PSD
Santarém		Tomar	351.2	86	36,859	77	122	109	11	PSD-CDS
Santarém		Torres Novas	270.0	116	34,719	80	138	98	10	PS
Santarém		Vila Nova da Barquinha	49.6	294	7,783	207	159	86	4	PS
Setúbal		Alcácer do Sal	1,465.3	2	11,082	181	9	302	4	PS
Setúbal		Alcochete	128.4	226	20,101	121	117	114	3	PS
Setúbal		Almada	70.2	281	181,232	8	2,356	9	5	PS
Setúbal		Barreiro	31.8	300	79,966	33	2,484	8	4	PS
Setúbal		Grândola	807.5	16	14,165	154	18	259	4	PS
Setúbal		Moita	55.3	291	68,950	38	1,270	19	4	PS
Setúbal		Montijo	348.1	88	59,197	47	116	115	5	IND
Setúbal		Palmela	462.9	58	72,938	35	126	105	4	PCP-PEV
Setúbal		Santiago do Cacém	1,059.8	12	28,246	91	28	235	8	IND
Setúbal		Seixal	95.5	253	173,163	12	1,725	12	4	PCP-PEV
Setúbal		Sesimbra	195.0	163	55,504	51	226	63	3	PCP-PEV
Setúbal		Setúbal	171.9	184	123,548	22	699	26	5	IND
Setúbal		Sines	202.6	156	14,771	148	67	163	2	PCP-PEV
Viana do Castelo		Arcos de Valdevez	447.6	60	20,859	118	55	179	36	PSD
Viana do Castelo		Caminha	137.4	213	16,442	138	123	108	14	PSD-CDS
Viana do Castelo		Melgaço	238.1	136	7,599	209	41	206	13	PSD-CDS
Viana do Castelo		Monção	211.3	154	18,032	129	94	133	24	PSD
Viana do Castelo		Paredes de Coura	138.2	212	8,709	197	68	162	16	PS
Viana do Castelo		Ponte da Barca	182.2	171	11,178	178	71	161	17	PSD
Viana do Castelo		Ponte de Lima	320.3	96	41,130	70	139	97	39	CDS
Viana do Castelo		Valença	117.1	237	14,159	155	122	110	11	PS
Viana do Castelo		Viana do Castelo	318.6	99	86,780	29	285	53	27	PS
Viana do Castelo		Vila Nova de Cerveira	108.6	244	9,327	192	81	147	11	PS
Vila Real		Alijó	297.6	107	10,324	186	47	195	14	PSD-CDS
Vila Real		Boticas	322.0	94	4,885	264	19	257	10	PSD
Vila Real		Chaves	591.3	37	37,419	75	75	155	39	PS
Vila Real		Mesão Frio	26.7	301	3,485	285	174	79	5	PS
Vila Real		Mondim de Basto	172.1	182	6,405	225	49	189	6	PSD
Vila Real		Montalegre	805.8	17	9,142	194	15	272	25	PS
Vila Real		Murça	189.4	168	5,256	256	34	218	7	PSD
Vila Real		Peso da Régua	94.9	256	14,402	152	190	73	8	PSD
Vila Real		Ribeira de Pena	217.5	148	5,861	240	33	221	5	PS
Vila Real		Sabrosa	156.9	194	5,634	246	44	199	12	PS
Vila Real		Santa Marta de Penaguião	69.3	283	5,983	237	121	111	7	PS
Vila Real		Valpaços	548.8	45	14,590	149	35	216	25	PSD
Vila Real		Vila Pouca de Aguiar	437.1	64	11,772	172	35	217	14	PSD
Vila Real		Vila Real	378.8	81	49,928	57	133	101	20	PS
Viseu		Armamar	117.2	236	5,650	245	62	169	14	PSD
Viseu		Carregal do Sal	116.9	238	9,177	193	90	136	5	PS
Viseu		Castro Daire	379.1	78	13,732	157	44	198	16	PSD-CDS
Viseu		Cinfães	239.3	134	17,432	132	89	137	14	PS
Viseu		Lamego	165.4	189	24,129	105	164	84	18	PSD-CDS
Viseu		Mangualde	219.3	145	18,592	128	96	130	12	PS
Viseu		Moimenta da Beira	220.0	144	9,733	191	50	187	16	PS
Viseu		Mortágua	251.2	126	9,059	195	41	205	7	PS
Viseu		Nelas	125.7	230	13,323	159	115	117	7	PSD
Viseu		Oliveira de Frades	145.4	205	9,763	189	73	160	8	PSD-CDS
Viseu		Penalva do Castelo	134.2	217	7,342	211	65	166	11	PS
Viseu		Penedono	133.7	219	2,804	298	25	241	7	PSD
Viseu		Resende	123.4	232	9,762	190	97	129	11	PS
Viseu		Santa Comba Dão	112.0	241	10,925	184	111	120	6	PSD-IL
Viseu		São João da Pesqueira	266.1	117	6,772	219	31	225	11	PSD
Viseu		São Pedro do Sul	349.0	87	15,197	145	55	178	14	PS
Viseu		Sátão	201.9	157	11,138	180	66	164	9	PSD
Viseu		Sernancelhe	228.6	141	5,793	241	27	237	13	PSD
Viseu		Tabuaço	133.9	218	5,052	258	49	191	13	PS
Viseu		Tarouca	100.1	248	7,615	208	83	143	7	PSD
Viseu		Tondela	371.2	82	25,824	97	84	142	19	PSD
Viseu		Vila Nova de Paiva	175.5	177	4,753	267	56	212	5	PS
Viseu		Viseu	507.1	52	101,977	25	191	72	25	PS
Viseu		Vouzela	193.7	165	9,765	188	61	174	9	PSD
Azores		Angra do Heroísmo	239.0	135	33,786	84	147	92	19	PS
Azores		Calheta	126.3	229	3,494	284	31	224	5	PSD
Azores		Corvo	17.1	306	435	308	26	238	1	PS
Azores		Horta	173.1	181	14,466	150	88	138	13	PSD-CDS
Azores		Lagoa	45.6	297	14,920	146	322	49	5	PS
Azores		Lajes das Flores	70.1	282	1,446	306	21	249	7	PS
Azores		Lajes do Pico	155.3	197	4,403	271	31	226	6	PS
Azores		Madalena	147.1	203	6,533	223	42	202	6	PSD
Azores		Nordeste	99.9	249	4,436	270	53	181	9	PSD
Azores		Ponta Delgada	233.0	138	68,758	39	277	54	24	PSD
Azores		Povoação	108.0	246	5,867	239	62	172	6	PS
Azores		Praia da Vitória	161.3	191	19,740	123	126	104	11	PSD-CDS
Azores		Ribeira Grande	180.2	174	32,280	89	163	85	14	PSD
Azores		Santa Cruz da Graciosa	60.7	290	4,100	278	79	150	4	PSD-CDS
Azores		Santa Cruz das Flores	70.9	280	2,098	305	35	215	4	IND
Azores		São Roque do Pico	142.4	207	3,411	288	26	239	5	PSD
Azores		Velas	117.4	235	4,952	262	48	193	6	CDS
Azores		Vila do Porto	96.9	251	5,502	250	57	176	5	PS
Azores		Vila Franca do Campo	78.0	270	10,398	185	142	95	6	PS
Madeira		Calheta	110.3	243	11,162	179	107	122	8	PSD
Madeira		Câmara de Lobos	52.6	292	32,786	86	668	28	5	PSD
Madeira		Funchal	75.7	274	107,562	24	1,332	16	10	PSD-CDS
Madeira		Machico	67.6	285	19,595	124	315	50	5	PS
Madeira		Ponta do Sol	46.8	295	8,709	198	175	78	3	PSD-CDS
Madeira		Porto Moniz	82.6	264	2,528	301	33	220	4	PS
Madeira		Porto Santo	42.4	298	5,562	248	103	125	1	PSD-CDS
Madeira		Ribeira Brava	64.9	287	13,080	162	193	71	4	PSD-CDS
Madeira		Santa Cruz	68.0	284	44,178	68	481	38	5	JPP
Madeira		Santana	136.3	215	6,488	224	62	171	6	CDS
Madeira		São Vicente	80.8	268	4,972	261	75	154	3	CH

== Maps ==
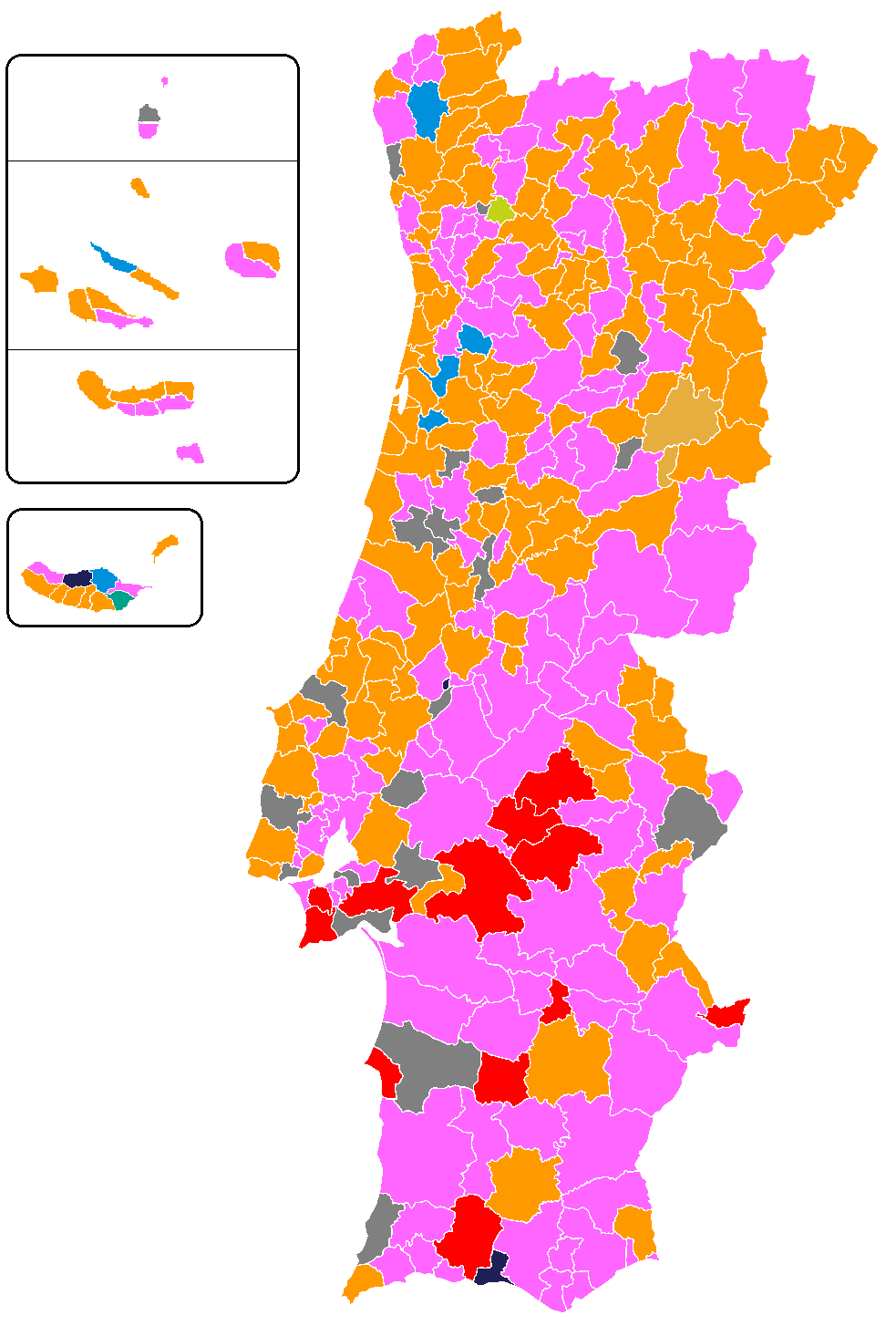
Ruling parties per municipality (2025–2029) (Note: In the maps, the archipelagos of the Azores and Madeira are not to scale and there are more than 308 different areas because three municipalities are not contiguous, forming exclaves.)

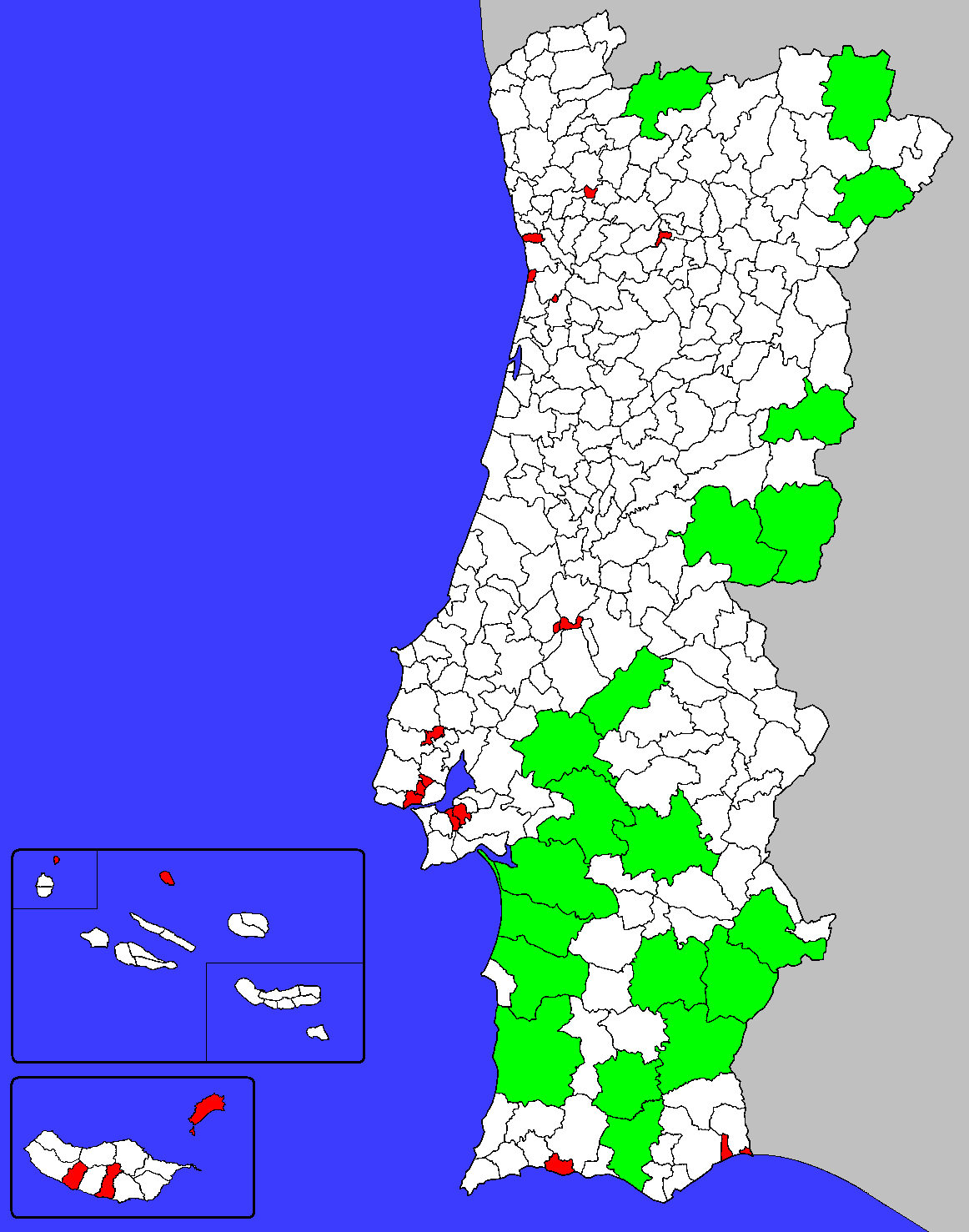
The 20 biggest and the 20 smallest municipalities (2011)

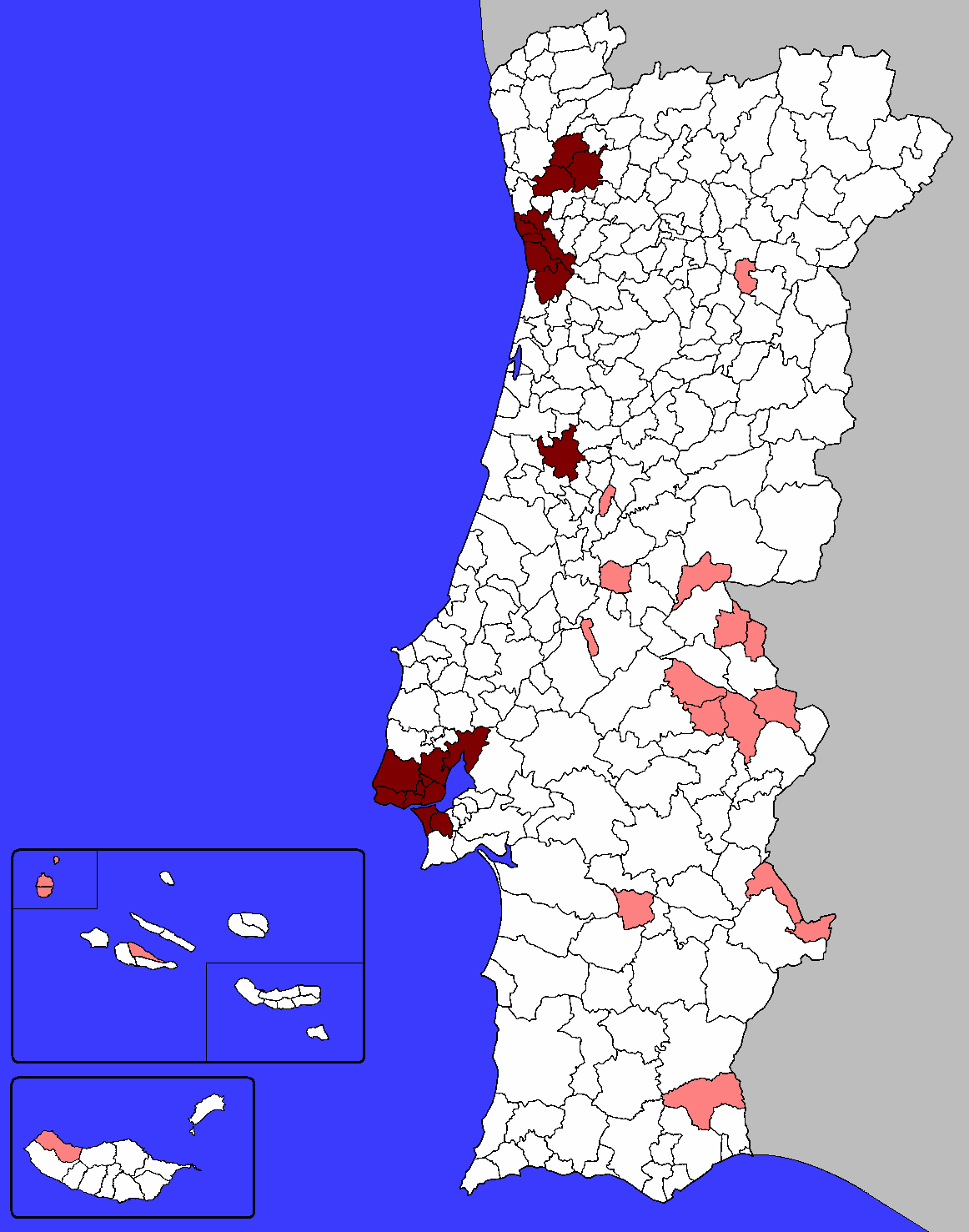
The 20 most and the 20 least populated municipalities (2011)

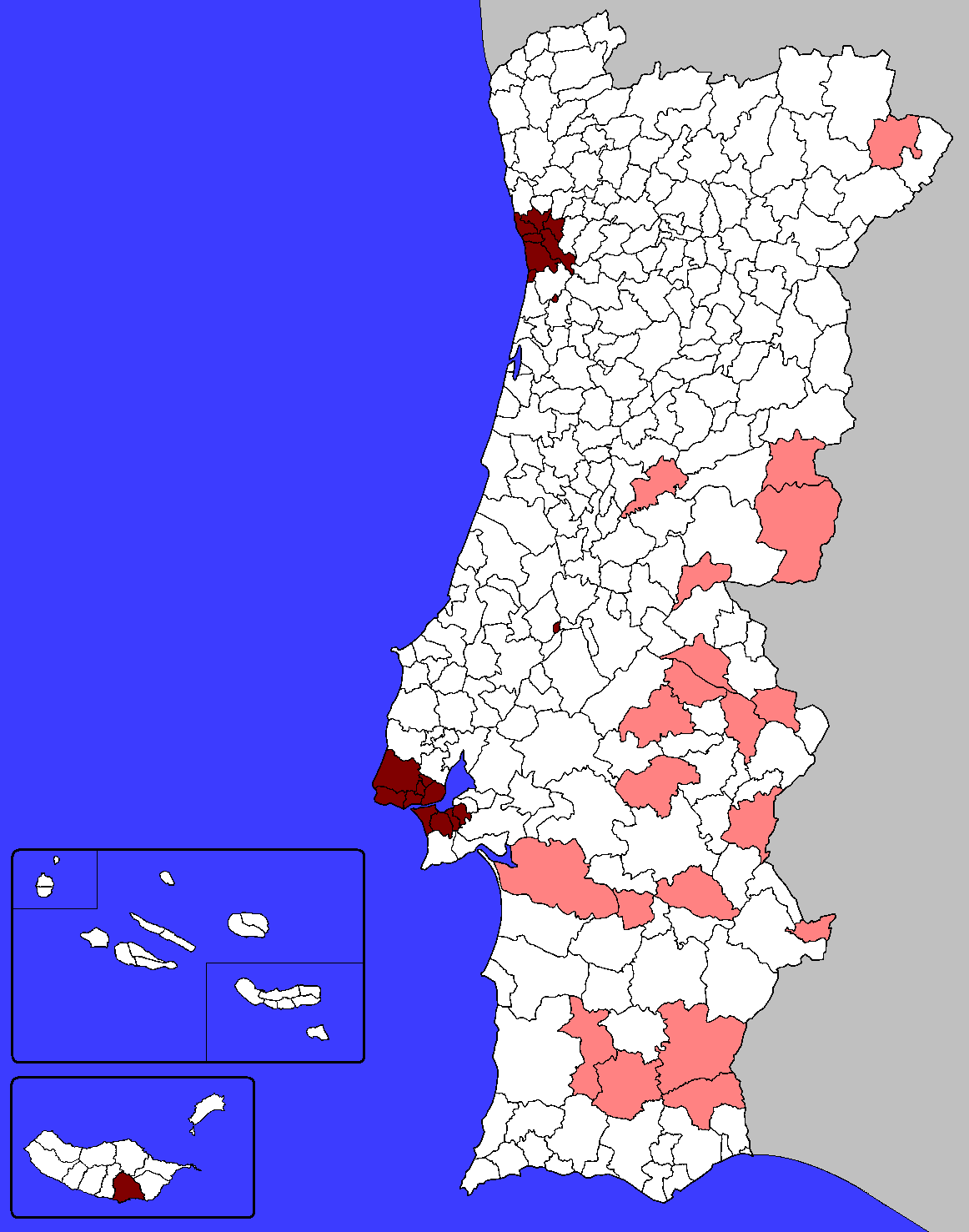
The 20 most and the 20 least densely populated municipalities (2011)

== See also ==
- Subdivisions of Portugal
- Municipalities of Portugal
- List of former municipalities of Portugal
- List of cities in Portugal
- List of towns in Portugal
- List of parishes of Portugal
- Concelho
- Freguesia
- 2025 Portuguese local elections
