= Leiria District =

District of Portugal

Coordinates: 39°44′38″N 8°48′25″W

District of Leiria Distrito de Leiria (Portuguese)
- District
- Country: Portugal
- Region: Oeste e Vale do Tejo and Centro
- Historical province: Beira Litoral and Estremadura
- No. of municipalities: 16
- No. of parishes: 116
- Capital: Leiria

Area
  - Total: 3,515 km^{2} (1,357 sq mi)

Population 2011
  - Total: 470,930
  - Density: 134.0/km^{2} (347.0/sq mi)
- ISO 3166 code: PT-10
- No. of parliamentary representatives: 10

The District of Leiria (Portuguese: Distrito de Leiria [lɐjˈɾi.ɐ]) is a district located between the Oeste e Vale do Tejo and Centro regions of Portugal, and divided between the traditional provinces of Beira Litoral and Estremadura. It borders on the north with district of Coimbra, on the east with district of Castelo Branco and with district of Santarém, on the south with district of Lisbon and on the west with the Atlantic Ocean. The district capital is the city of Leiria.

== Municipalities ==
Municipalities of the District "C"=city/cidade "T"=town/vila
| Name | Status |
|---|---|
| Alcobaça | C |
| Alvaiázere | T |
| Ansião | T |
| Batalha | T |
| Bombarral | T |
| Caldas da Rainha | C |
| Castanheira de Pera | T |
| Figueiró dos Vinhos | T |
| Leiria | C |
| Marinha Grande | C |
| Nazaré | T |
| Óbidos | T |
| Pedrógão Grande | T |
| Peniche | C |
| Pombal | C |
| Porto de Mós | T |

In the current main division of the country, the district is divided into two NUTS of Portugal, the Oeste e Vale do Tejo and the Centro regions, with its municipalities distributed by the Nomenclatures of territorial units for statistical purposes (NUTIII) of the Oeste (which was integrated into the new NUTII created in 2023) and the Leiria region.

- Oeste e Vale do Tejo
  - Oeste
    - Alcobaça
    - Bombarral
    - Caldas da Rainha
    - Nazaré
    - Óbidos
    - Peniche
- Centro
  - Leiria region
    - Alvaiázere
    - Ansião
    - Castanheira de Pêra
    - Figueiró dos Vinhos
    - Pedrógão Grande
    - Batalha
    - Leiria
    - Marinha Grande
    - Pombal
    - Porto de Mós

== Summary of votes and seats won 1976-2022 ==
Summary of election results from Leiria district, 1976-2022
| Parties | % | S | % | S | % | S | % | S | % | S | % | S | % | S | % | S | % | S | % | S | % | S | % | S | % | S | % | S | % | S | % | S |
| Parties | 1976 | | 1979 | | 1980 | | 1983 | | 1985 | | 1987 | | 1991 | | 1995 | | 1999 | | 2002 | | 2005 | | 2009 | | 2011 | | 2015 | | 2019 | | 2022 | |
|---|---|---|---|---|---|---|---|---|---|---|---|---|---|---|---|---|---|---|---|---|---|---|---|---|---|---|---|---|---|---|---|---|
| PS | 31.1 | 4 | 23.2 | 3 | 22.7 | 3 | 32.7 | 4 | 19.6 | 2 | 18.7 | 2 | 23.0 | 3 | 36.7 | 4 | 36.8 | 4 | 29.5 | 3 | 35.6 | 4 | 30.1 | 4 | 20.7 | 3 | 24.8 | 3 | 31.1 | 4 | 35.7 | 5 |
| PSD | 31.2 | 4 | In AD | | | | 35.6 | 4 | 38.6 | 5 | 60.8 | 9 | 61.2 | 7 | 43.3 | 5 | 42.6 | 5 | 50.8 | 6 | 39.8 | 5 | 34.9 | 4 | 47.0 | 6 | In PàF | | 33.5 | 5 | 34.7 | 4 |
| CDS-PP | 19.4 | 2 | In AD | | | | 16.2 | 2 | 12.2 | 1 | 6.0 | | 4.8 | | 11.4 | 1 | 9.9 | 1 | 9.8 | 1 | 8.9 | 1 | 12.6 | 1 | 12.8 | 1 | In PàF | | 5.3 | | 2.1 | |
| PCP/APU/CDU | 7.3 | 1 | 10.9 | 1 | 9.7 | 1 | 9.5 | 1 | 7.9 | 1 | 5.9 | | 4.5 | | 4.5 | | 5.3 | | 4.1 | | 4.6 | | 5.1 | | 5.0 | | 5.1 | | 4.3 | | 3.1 | |
| AD | | | 56.2 | 7 | 59.8 | 7 | | | | | | | | | | | | | | | | | | | | | | | | | | |
| PRD | | | | | | | | | 15.3 | 2 | 3.0 | | | | | | | | | | | | | | | | | | | | | |
| BE | | | | | | | | | | | | | | | | | 1.7 | | 2.2 | | 5.5 | | 9.5 | 1 | 5.1 | | 9.7 | 1 | 9.4 | 1 | 4.5 | |
| PàF | | | | | | | | | | | | | | | | | | | | | | | | | | | 48.4 | 6 | | | | |
| CHEGA | | | | | | | | | | | | | | | | | | | | | | | | | | | | | 1.5 | | 8.0 | 1 |
| Total seats | 11 | | | | | | | | | | | | 10 | | | | | | | | | | | | | | | | | | | |
Source: Comissão Nacional de Eleições

== See also ==
- Casal de São Simão, a village in the district of Leiria
