= Adeodato Barreto =

Portuguese poet and writer (1905–1937)

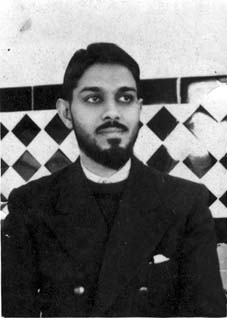
- Barreto, unknown date
- Born: Júlio Francisco António Adeodato Barreto; 3 December 1905; Margao, Portuguese Goa
- Died: 6 August 1937 (aged 31); Olivais, Coimbra, Portugal
- Occupations: Poet; writer
- Children: Kalidás Barreto

Júlio Francisco António Adeodato Barreto (3 December 1905 – 6 August 1937) was a Luso-Goan poet and writer. His works include important archetypes and paradigms from Hindu culture. In his poems there are notions of eternal return and transmigration, which are considered anchors of Indian philosophy.

== Early life ==
His father, Vicente Mariano Barreto, was a man of considerable erudition and a pedagogical sense that bore fruit in his child. Having completed his secondary education in Pangim, Adeodato Barreto left for Portugal at the age of seventeen and enrolled at Coimbra in the law school in 1923 and, the following year, in the Faculty of Arts, for a course in history and philosophy. In Coimbra he was elected chairman of the Centro Republicano-Académico in October 1929. He graduated in law in 1928 and in historical and philosophical sciences in 1929, respectively, from the Faculty of Law and the Faculty of Arts, University of Coimbra.

== In teaching and law ==
He taught in Figueira da Foz and Coimbra. He was later a law clerk in Montemor-o-Novo and a notary in Aljustrel. He collaborated assiduously with the periodicals O Diabo and Seara Nova. He founded Índia Nova (1928-1929), which published six issues, and Círculo (1934), which had in all seven numbers.

He was the father of Kalidás Barreto, the Portuguese politician and trade unionist. He was a close friend of Flausino Torres, with whom he also studied.

== Ventures in the media ==
His dream, even while still at the university, was to create a newspaper. Thus was born the Índia Nova, in Coimbra, where he was a director along with José Teles and Telo Mascarenhas. Next he founded the Instituto Indiano at the Faculdade de Letras de Coimbra. This had the support of Mendes dos Remédios, Providência da Costa, e Joaquim de Carvalho who promptly helped to organise it, and correspond with renowned Orientalists such as Rabindranath Tagore and Silvain Lévi. The Institute's activities were crowned with some success. It resulted in conferences, newspaper articles as well as the publication of Edições Swatwa. However, Adeodato Barreto devoted himself to the translation of the work of Romain Rolland on the life of Mahatma Gandhi. When it was completed and announced to its famous writer and Nobel Prize in Literature winner, its original author answered him immediately in an appreciative letter and declined to retain any copyright. The translation of the work on Mahatma Gandhi was however no published due to several editorial difficulties then.

== Legal profession ==
On finishing his university studies, he was absorbed in the 4th Stage of Professional Group of High Schools. He had intended to teach, but soon opted for the legal profession. In fact, he was appointed associate professor of the Liceu de Évora in 1932 and he was soon accepted for the position of law clerk in Montemor-o-Novo. Months later, he was appointed notary in Aljustrel and remained there four years. In this part of the Alentejo, Adeodato Barreto founded and directed a new periodical called O Círculo and collaborated assiduously with the periodicals O Diabo and Seara Nova. His book Civilização Hindu was born of a series of articles previously published in the Seara Nova. Later he wrote O Livro da Vida (The Book of Life), a collection of poems published posthumously in 1940 in Goa.

== Esperanto ==
In Coimbra, Barreto studied Esperanto, the international language, and was an enthusiast and advocate for its use. In Aljustrel he contributed to the emergence of a "burgeoning Esperanto movement", in the words of Francisco Rasquinho.

His aim to intervene among the most unprotected sections led him to create a weekly to provide support to the poor and to offer free evening literacy classes to mine workers. His activities for the disadvantaged did not go unnoticed by the PIDE, who gave it a subversive connotation. So Barreto was watched and, later, when he ran for the post of notary in Goa he was passed over due to his politics.

Tuberculosis claimed him at 32, on 6 August 1937 at the Sanatório dos Olivais in Coimbra.

== Bibliography ==
- Civilização Hindu (Hindu Civilization), 1935
- Fragmentos - Testamento Moral de Vicente Mariano Barreto, 1936
- O Livro da Vida. (Cânticos Indianos) (The Book of Life), 1940 (posthumous)
