= Kalidás Barreto =

Portuguese politician and trade unionist (1932–2020)

- Born: Luís Maria Kalidás da Costa Barreto; 16 October 1932; Montemor-o-Novo, Portugal
- Died: 30 October 2020 (aged 88); Castanheira de Pera, Portugal
- Occupation: Trade unionist
- Political party: Partido Socialista
- Father: Adeodato Barreto

Luís Maria Kalidás da Costa Barreto GOL (16 October 1932 – 30 October 2020) was a Portuguese accountant and trade unionist. He was one of the founders of Portuguese trades union confederation, the CGTP, some five decades earlier, and died on 30 October 2020 in Castanheira de Pera, fourteen days after his 88th birthday.

== Personal life ==
Luís Maria Kalidás da Costa Barreto was born on 16 October 1932, in Montemor-o-Novo, Évora district. Montemor-o-Novo, distrito de Évora.

The son of the Goan intellectual Adeodato Barreto, his third name was a reference to Kalidasa, a renowned classical Sanskrit poet and playwright.

== Education ==
He underwent the Complementary Accounting and Commerce Course in Coimbra, and settled in Castanheira de Pera. He worked as a commercial director in several companies in that region, namely in the textile industry.

== Political participation ==
He began his political participation early. He participated in initiatives to oppose the then long-term dictatorship of António Salazar and Marcelo Caetano, as a member of the support committee for the candidacy of General Humberto Delgado to the Presidency of the Republic of Portugal, in 1958. He also organized the Democratic Opposition in Castanheira de Pera, in 1969.

After the Portuguese Revolution of Carnations of 25 April 1974 he became a member of the Administrative Commission of the Municipality of Castanheira de Pera and first elected president of the Municipal Assembly of Castanheira de Pera, in 1976.

== In politics, trades unionism ==
Barreto became a deputy to the Portuguese Constituent Assembly in 1975 representing the Socialist Party.

He later moved away from the Socialist Party and participated, in 1978, in the founding of the Union of the Left for Socialist Democracy (União da Esquerda para a Democracia Socialista, UEDS), later coming closer to the PS.

A trade unionist, he was among the founders of the Confederação Nacional dos Trabalhadores Portugueses (National Confederation of Portuguese Workers, CGTP) in 1970, after which he led the Organização Sindical de Têxteis do Centro (Center's Textile Union Organization).

On 25 April 2004, the 30th anniversary of the 1974 Revolution, he was made a Grand Officer of the Order of Freedom, by the then Portuguese President Jorge Sampaio.

After actively participating in the formation of the Intersindical Nacional (National Intersindical_, and later the General Confederation of Portuguese Workers (CGTP), in 1970, Kalidás Barreto led the Sindicato dos Têxteis do Centro (Textile Union of the center), and was the national director of CGTP and technical advisor for Portuguese missions to the International Labour Organization (ILO).

He contributed to the regional press, mainly to newspapers in Castanheira de Pera and in the neighbouring municipalities of Figueiró dos Vinhos and Lousã, was an associate provider for the National Institute for the Use of Free Times (INATEL) and has authored several books.

A cultural promoter in Castanheira de Pera, he was honoured in 2019 on the Santo António da Neve community site, within the scope of the Serra da Lousã Peoples Meeting, of which he was one of the founders, in 1997, on the proposal of the newspaper Trevim, from Lousã, which he contributed to for many years.

He was the beneficiary of the National Institute for the Use of Free Time or Instituto Nacional para o Aproveitamento dos Tempos Livres (INATEL).

== Published works ==
- Revistas de Costumes Locais, 1958
- Lenda da Princesa Peralta, 1964
- Subsídios para a História do Movimento Operário em Castanheira de Pêra, 1983
- A Organização Profissional dos Trabalhadores Têxteis de Leiria e Coimbra, 1987
- Dr. Manuel Diniz Henriques, 1987
- Monografia do Concelho de Castanheira de Pera, 1989
- Dr. Ernesto Marreca David - o Homem e a Obra, 1993
- Emprego, Modernização e Desenvolvimento, 1996
- Fábrica da Várzea - Projecto de Museu Têxtil em Castanheira de Pera, 1999
- Os Trabalhadores Laneiros do Distrito de Leiria, 2009
- Os Presos políticos de Castanheira de Pera - 1949 Não Apaguem a Memória, 2009
- Os Deputados de Leiria na Assembleia Constituinte, 1975-1976 (pref. Mário Soares), 2010
- Manuel Lopes de Almeida : um castanheirense na luta pela República em 5 de outubro de 1910, 2011
