= Casal de São Simão =

Village in Figueiró dos Vinhos, Portugal

Coordinates: 39°54′30″N 8°19′54″W

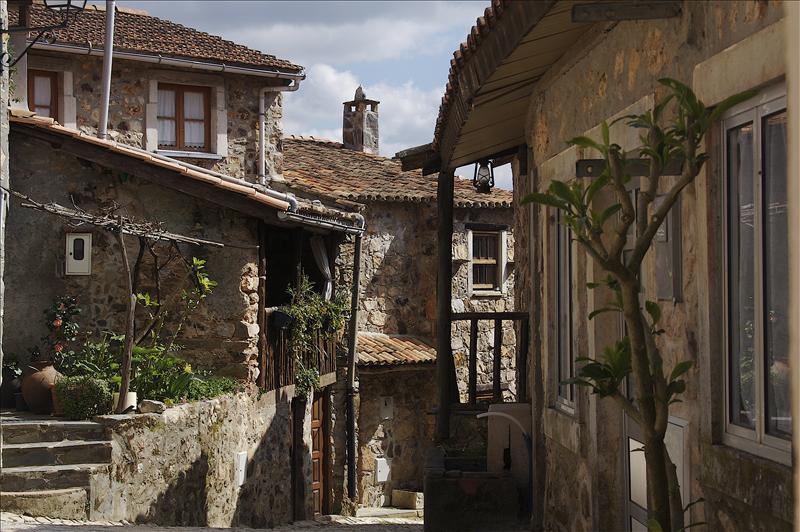
View from a street and typical houses

Casal de São Simão is a small village in the municipality Figueiró dos Vinhos, Portugal.
