= Alvaiázere =

- Municipality
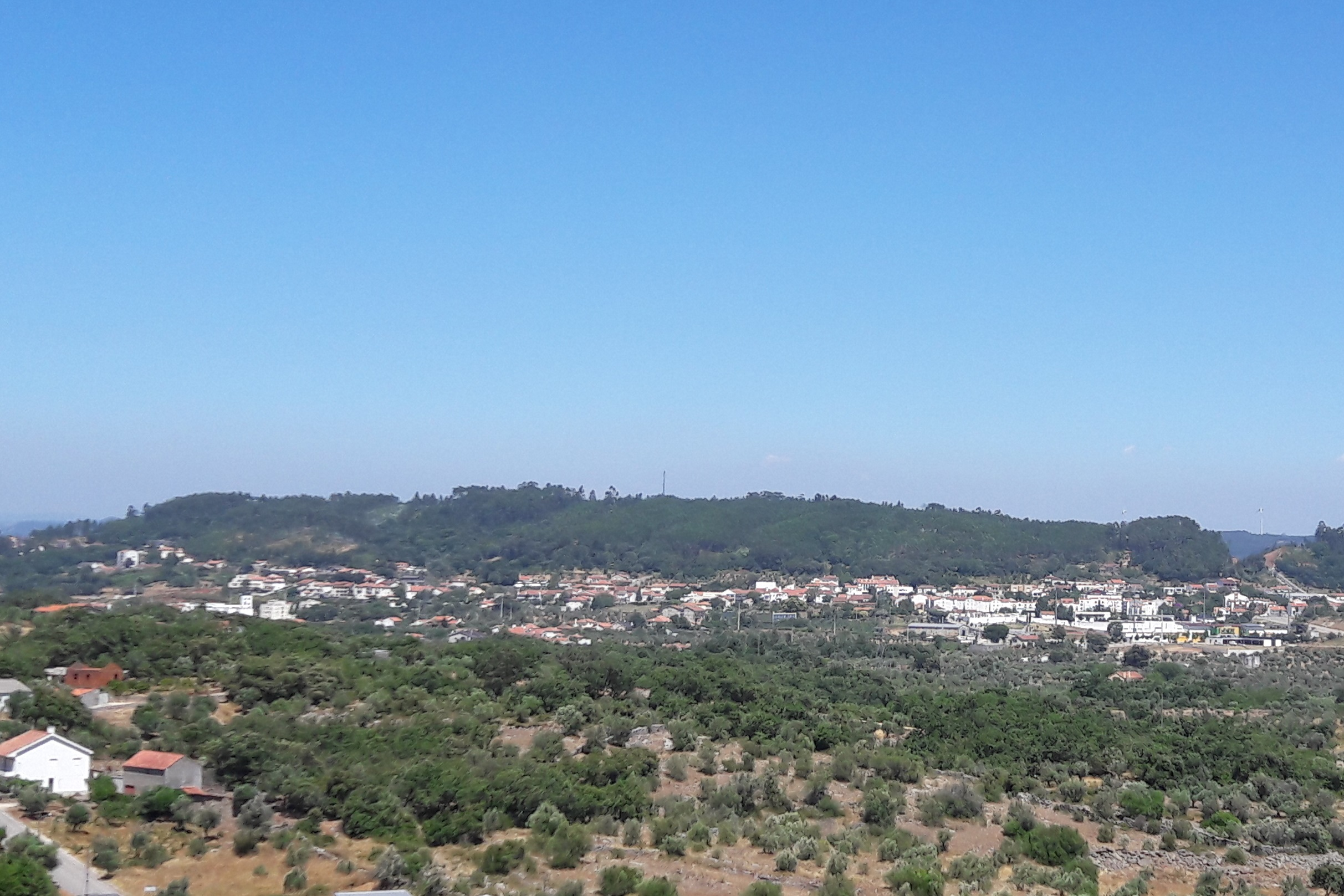

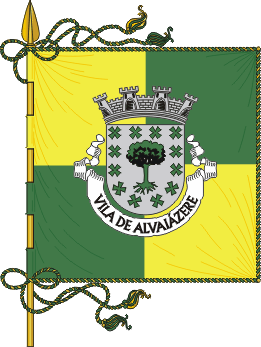
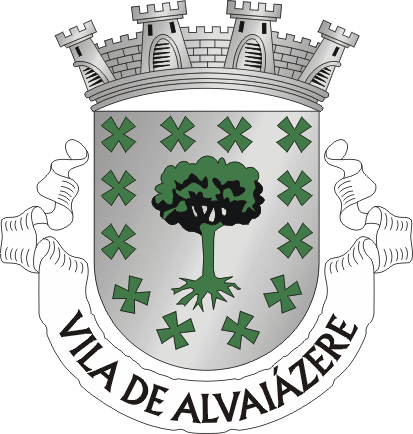
- Flag Coat of arms
- Interactive map of Alvaiázere
- Location in Portugal
- Coordinates: 39°49′N 8°23′W
- Country: Portugal
- Region: Centro
- Intermunic. comm.: Região de Leiria
- District: Leiria
- Parishes: 5

Government
  - President: Paulo Delgado Morgado (PSD)

Area
  - Total: 160.48 km^{2} (61.96 sq mi)

Population (2011)
  - Total: 7,287
  - Density: 45.41/km^{2} (117.6/sq mi)
- Time zone: UTC+00:00 (WET)
  - Summer (DST): UTC+01:00 (WEST)
- Local holiday: June 13
- Website: www.cm-alvaiazere.pt

Alvaiázere (European Portuguese pronunciation: [alvɐˈjazɨɾɨ]) is a portuguese municipality in the historical Beira Litoral province, in Central Region and district of Leiria. The population in 2011 was 7,287, in an area of 160.48 km^{2}.

The municipality is bordered by the municipalities of Ansião (to the north), Figueiró dos Vinhos (to the northeast and east), Ferreira do Zêzere (to the southeast), Ourém (to the southwest) and Pombal (to the west). The present Mayor is Paulo Delgado Morgado, elected by the Social Democratic Party. The municipal holiday is on June 13.

The name of Alvaiázere originates from the Arabic word al-bayyāz (البياز, 'the falconer'), and thus means 'lands of the falconer'. Manuel Vieira da Silva Borges e Abreu, 1st Baron of Alvaiázere was the main physician of King John VI of Portugal.

Storm Kristin caused a catastrophic impact in the municipality on 28 January 2026.

Population of the municipality of Alvaiázere (1801–2011)
1801	1849	1900	1930	1960	1981	1991	2001	2004	2011
3477	6426	11936	12870	13583	10510	9306	8438	8112	7287

== Parishes ==
Administratively, the municipality is divided into 5 civil parishes (freguesias):

- Almoster
- Alvaiázere
- Maçãs de Dona Maria
- Pelmá
- Pussos São Pedro

== Climate ==
Climate data for Rego da Murta, altitude: 241 m (791 ft)
Month	Jan	Feb	Mar	Apr	May	Jun	Jul	Aug	Sep	Oct	Nov	Dec	Year
Average precipitation mm (inches)	149 (5.9)	128 (5.0)	107 (4.2)	84 (3.3)	82 (3.2)	40 (1.6)	10 (0.4)	12 (0.5)	52 (2.0)	104 (4.1)	131 (5.2)	146 (5.7)	1,045 (41.1)
Source: Portuguese Environment Agency
