= Ansião =

- Municipality
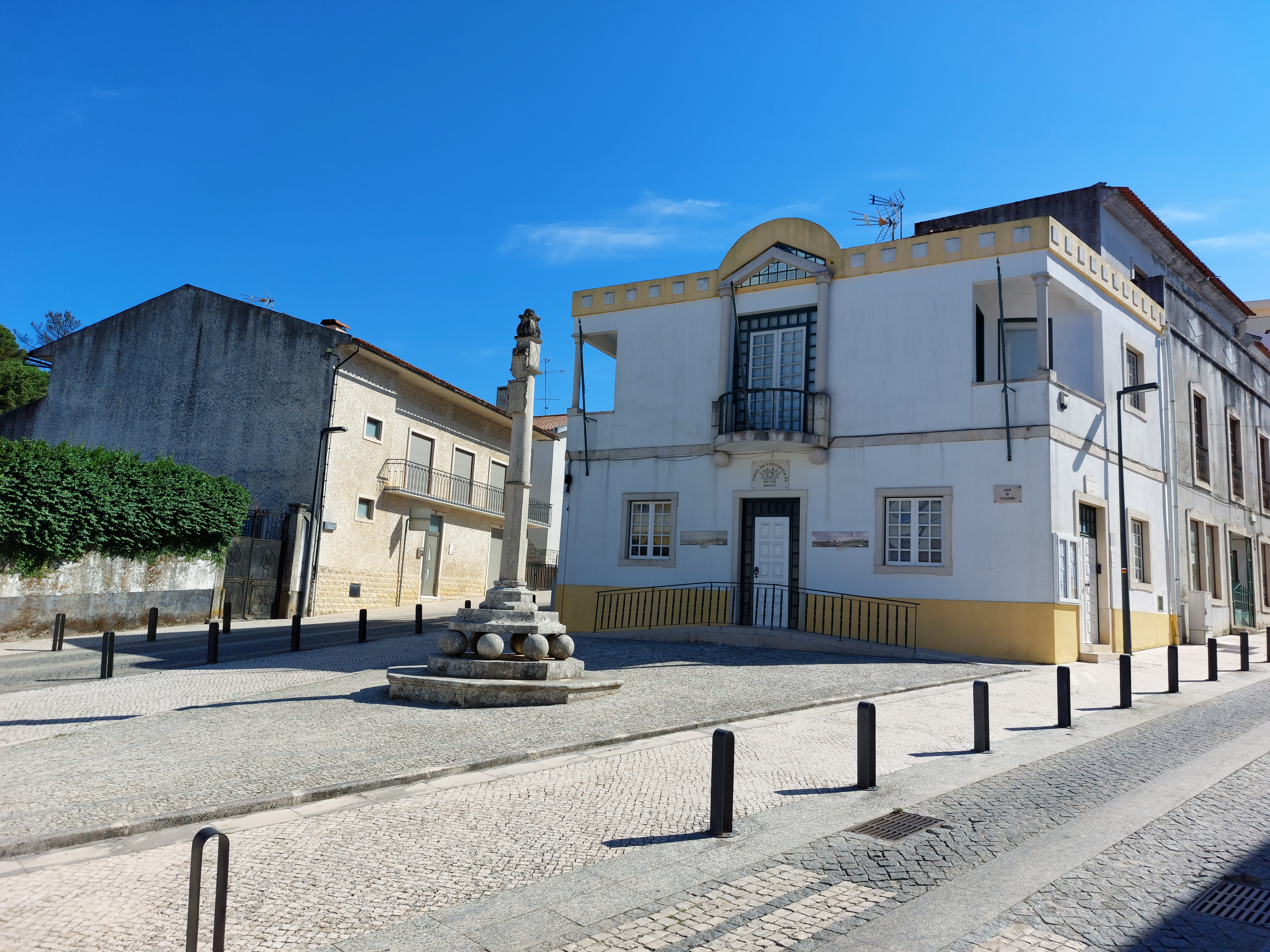
- The pillory of Ansião, with the administration building of the Junta de Freguesia de Ansião behind.

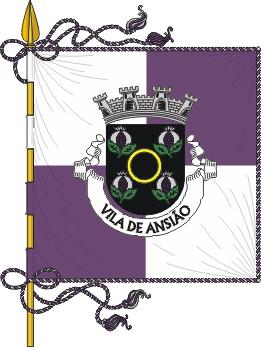
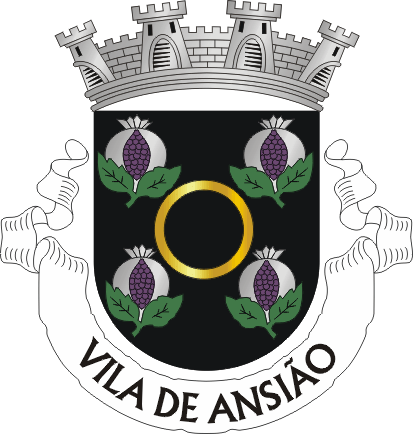
- Flag Coat of arms
- Interactive map of Ansião
- Location in Portugal
- Coordinates: 39°55′N 8°26′W
- Country: Portugal
- Region: Centro
- Intermunic. comm.: Região de Leiria
- District: Leiria
- Parishes: 6

Government
  - President: Jorge Humberto Fernandes Cancelinha (PSD)

Area
  - Total: 176.09 km^{2} (67.99 sq mi)

Population (2011)
  - Total: 13,128
  - Density: 74.553/km^{2} (193.09/sq mi)
- Time zone: UTC+00:00 (WET)
  - Summer (DST): UTC+01:00 (WEST)
- Local holiday: Ascension; May 25
- Website: http://www.cm-ansiao.pt

Ansião (Portuguese pronunciation: [ɐ̃siˈɐ̃w]) is a Portuguese municipality in the historical Beira Litoral province, in Central Region and district of Leiria. The population in 2011 was 13,128, in an area of 176.09 km^{2} (67.99 sq mi).

It comprises the freguesias of Alvorge, Ansião, Avelar, Chão de Couce, Lagarteira, Pousaflores, Santiago da Guarda and Torre de Vale de Todos.

As of 2026, the mayor is Jorge Humberto Fernandes Cancelinha, elected by the Social Democratic Party. The municipal holiday is Ascension Day.
