= Região de Leiria =

- Intermunicipal community
- Coordinates: 39.81°N 8.74°W
- Country: Portugal
- Region: Centro
- Established: 2014
- Seat: Leiria
- Municipalities: 10

Area
  - Total: 2,449.12 km^{2} (945.61 sq mi)

Population (2011)
  - Total: 294,632
  - Density: 120.301/km^{2} (311.579/sq mi)
- Time zone: UTC+00:00 (WET)
  - Summer (DST): UTC+01:00 (WEST)
- Website: www.cimregiaodeleiria.pt

The Comunidade Intermunicipal da Região de Leiria (Portuguese pronunciation: [ʁɨʒiˈɐ̃w dɨ lɐjˈɾi.ɐ]; English: Leiria Region) is an administrative division in western Portugal. It was created in 2014, replacing the former Associação de Municípios da Região de Leiria created in 2009. Since January 2015, Região de Leiria is also a NUTS3 subregion of Centro Region, that covers the same area as the intermunicipal community. The seat of the intermunicipal community is Leiria. Região de Leiria comprises a large part of the former district of Leiria. The population in 2011 was 294,632, in an area of 2,449.12 km².

== Municipalities ==
The intermunicipal community of Região de Leiria consists of 10 municipalities:

Municipality	Population (2011)	Area (km^{2})
Alvaiázere	7,287	160.48
Ansião	13,128	176.09
Batalha	15,805	103.42
Castanheira de Pera	3,191	66.77
Figueiró dos Vinhos	6,169	173.44
Leiria	126,897	565.09
Marinha Grande	38,681	187.25
Pedrógão Grande	3,915	128.75
Pombal	55,217	626.00
Porto de Mós	24,342	261.83
Total	294,632	2,449.12
