= Batalha, Portugal =

Batalha
- Municipality
- Town of Batalha
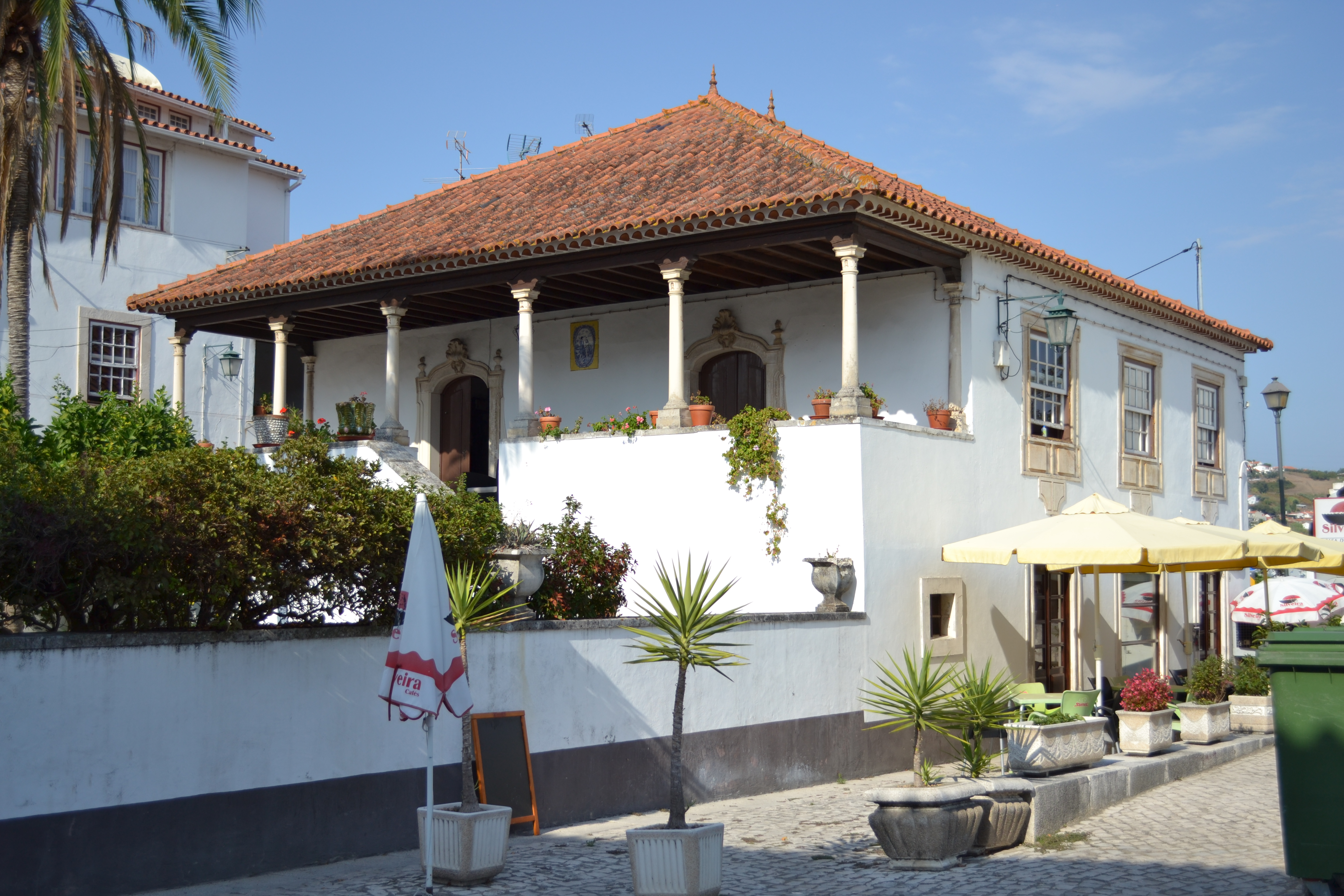
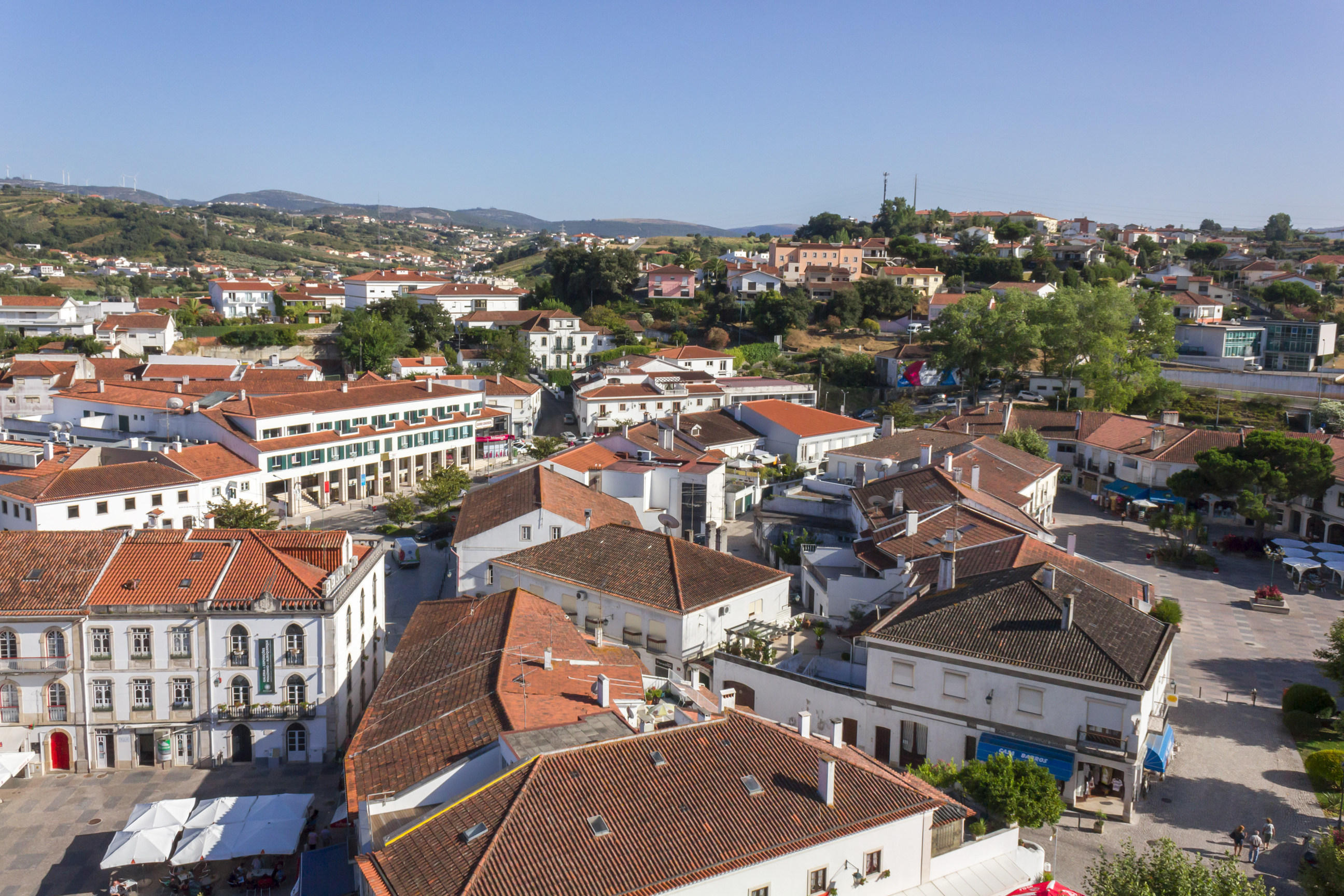
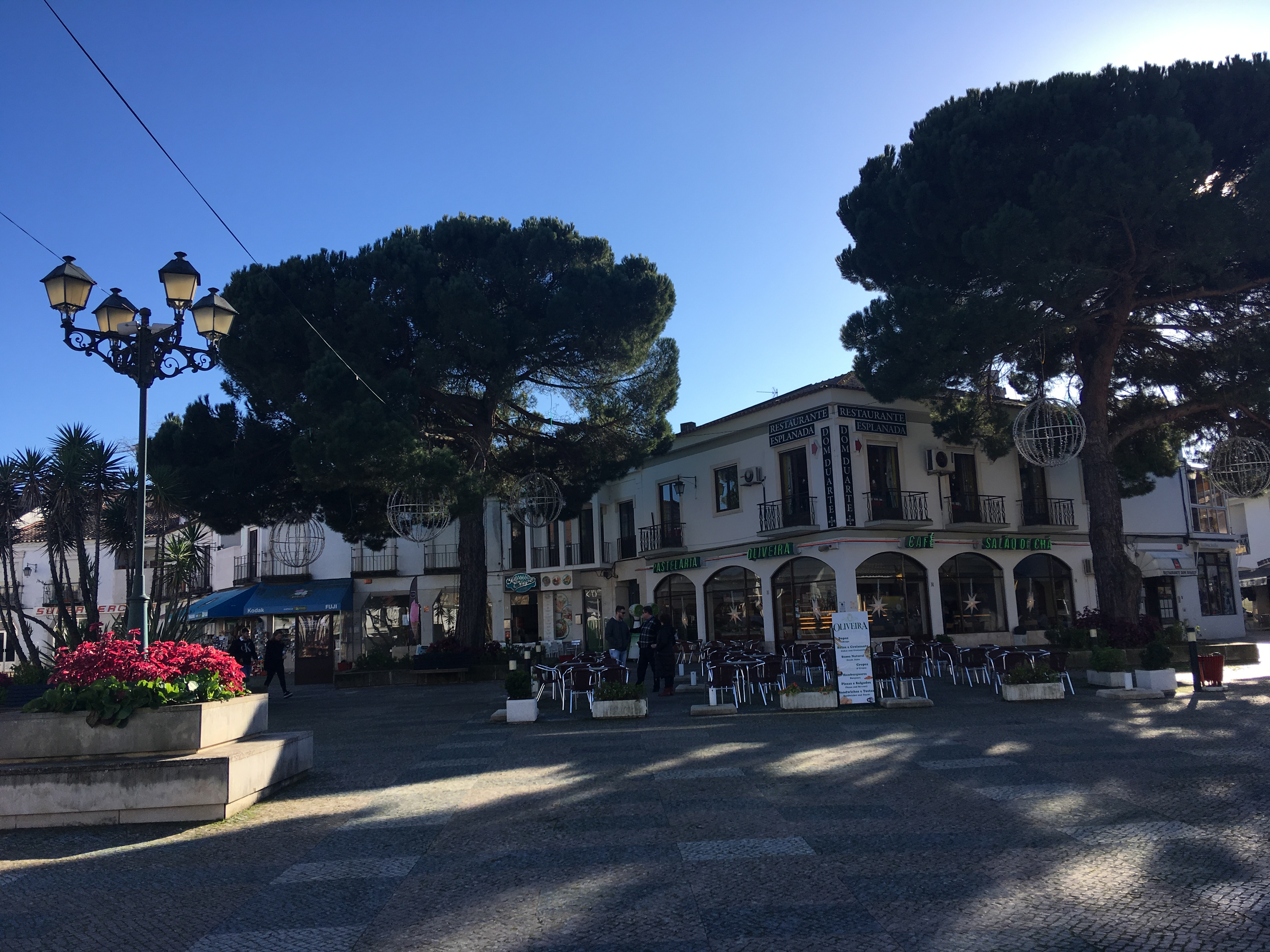
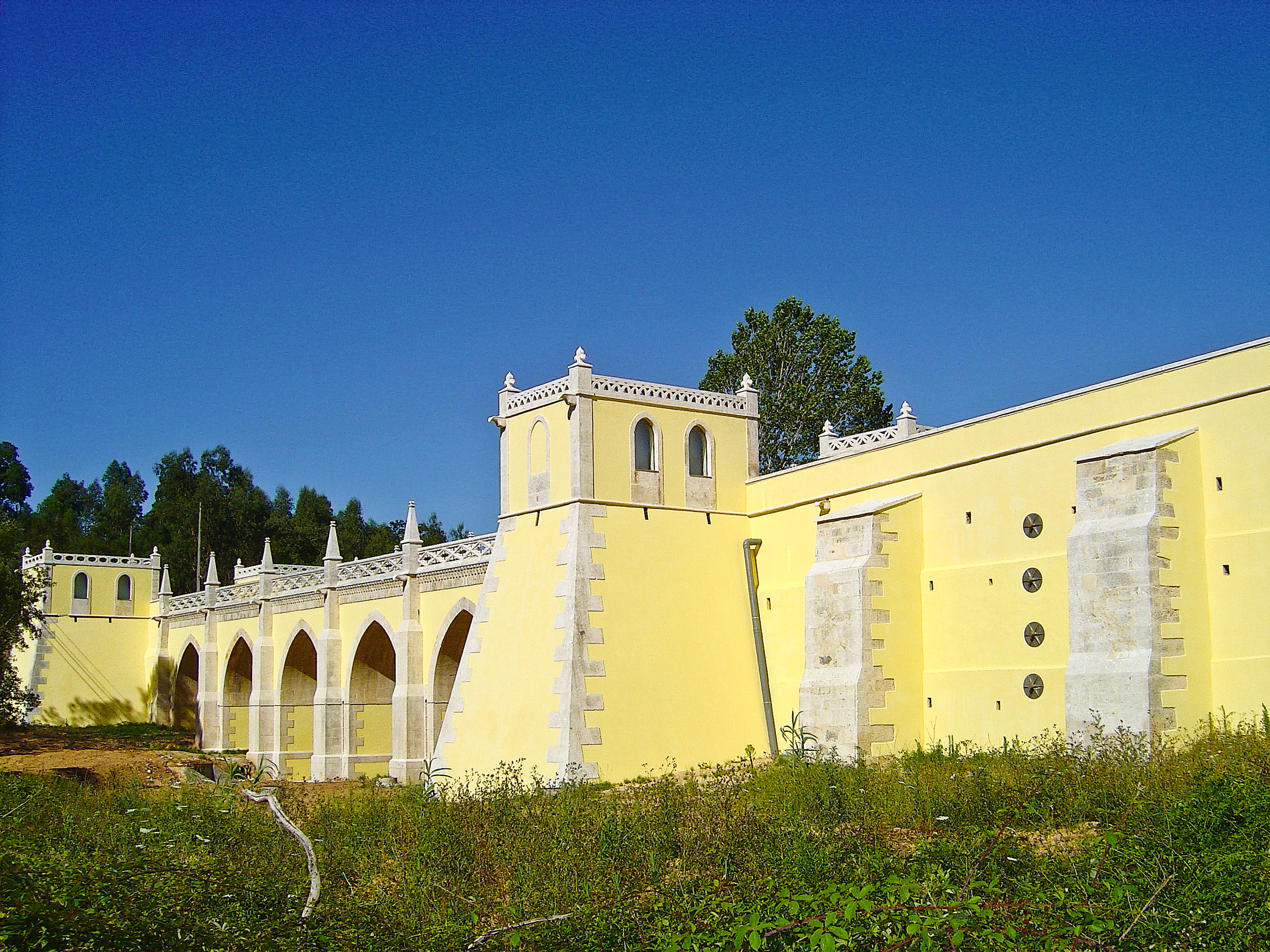
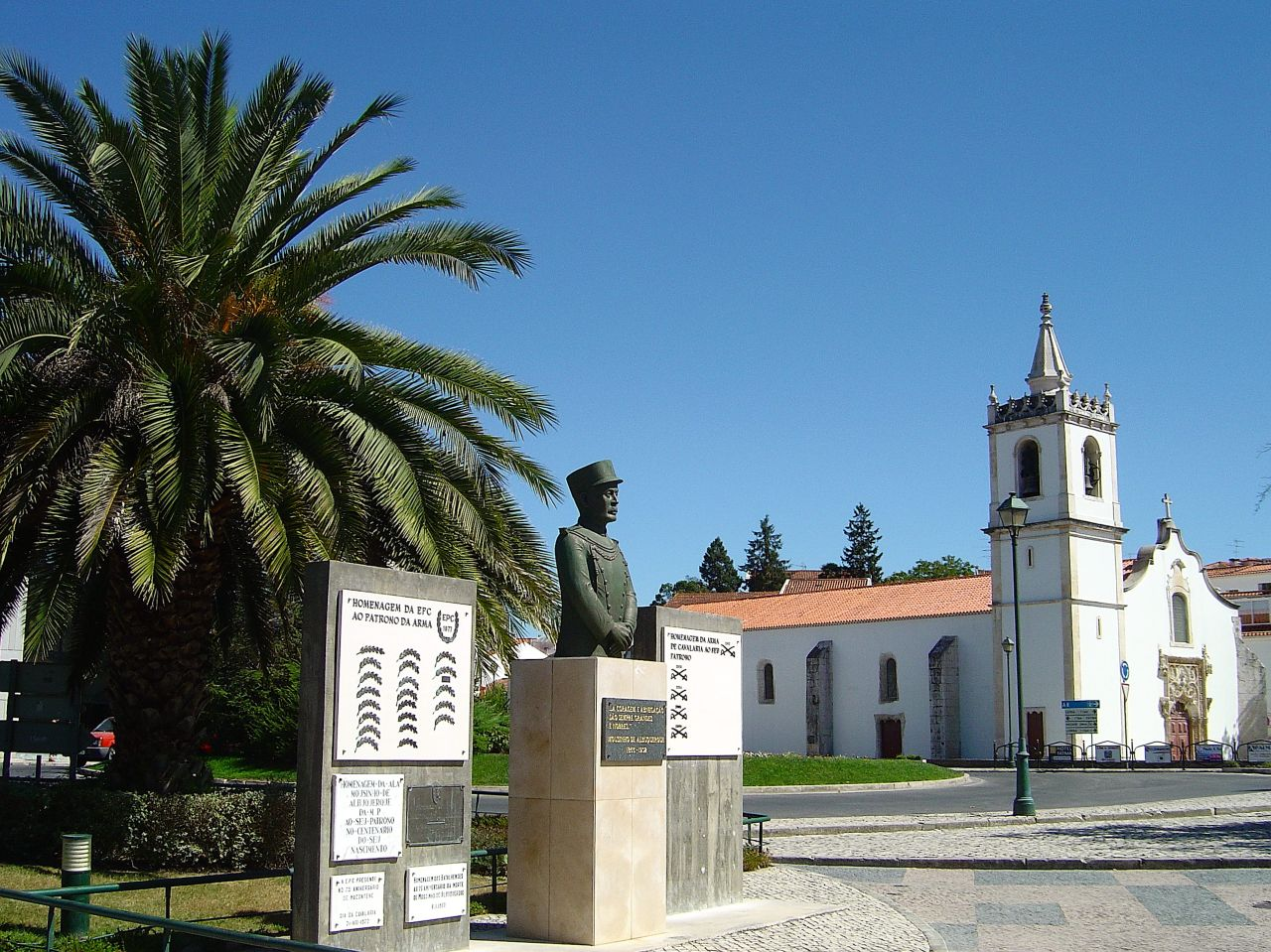

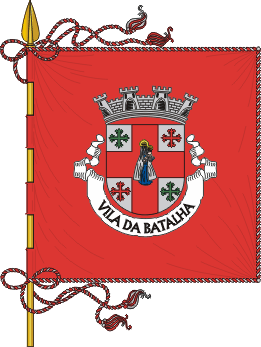
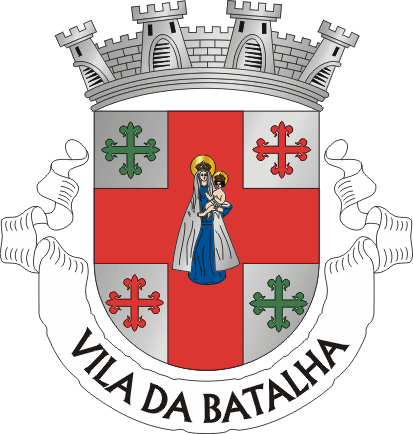
- Flag Coat of arms
- Interactive map of Batalha
- Location in Portugal
- Coordinates: 39°39′29″N 8°49′28″W
- Country: Portugal
- Region: Centro
- Intermunic. comm.: Região de Leiria
- District: Leiria
- Parishes: 4

Area
  - Total: 103.42 km^{2} (39.93 sq mi)

Population (2011)
  - Total: 15,805
  - Density: 152.82/km^{2} (395.81/sq mi)
- Time zone: UTC+00:00 (WET)
  - Summer (DST): UTC+01:00 (WEST)
- Website: www.cm-batalha.pt

Batalha (Portuguese pronunciation: [bɐˈtaʎɐ]), officially Town of Batalha (Portuguese: Vila da Batalha), is a town and a municipality in historical Beira Litoral province, and Leiria district in the Centro of Portugal. The town's name means "battle". The municipality population in 2011 was 15,805, in an area of 103.42 km^{2} (39.93 sq mi). The town proper has around 8,548 inhabitants in an area of 28.42 km^{2} (10.97 sq mi). The municipality is limited to the North and West by the municipality of Leiria, to the East by Ourém, to the Southeast by Alcanena and to the Southwest by Porto de Mós. Batalha joined the UNESCO Global Network of Learning Cities in 2020.

The town was founded by King D. João I of Portugal, jointly with the Monastery of Santa Maria da Vitória na Batalha (a World Heritage Site), to pay homage to the Portuguese victory at the Battle of Aljubarrota (14 August 1385) that put an end to the 1383–1385 Crisis.

== History ==
Although there are countless traces throughout the region that allude to a human occupation since prehistoric times, passing through the Roman period and, successively, throughout history (it is believed that the Roman settlement of Collipo, originally of the Turduli people, established in São Sebastião do Freixo), Vila da Batalha owes its origin to the construction of the Santa Maria da Vitória Monastery. In fact, Batalha was born with the Avis Dynasty and the consolidation of Independence in 1385.

The administrative figure of the parishes is only drawn and defined throughout the second half of the 19th century, with Liberalism, so that on 14 September 1512, when the Prior-Major of Santa Cruz de Coimbra, D. Pedro Vaz Gavião, creates the parish of Batalha, it is evidently the seat that, however, delimits and is the first form of future civil parish.

== Demography ==
Population of the municipality of Batalha (1801–2011)
1801	1849	1900	1930	1960	1981	1991	2001	2004	2011
2510	2445	7107	9634	13 811	12 588	13 329	15 002	15 542	15 805

== Monuments ==
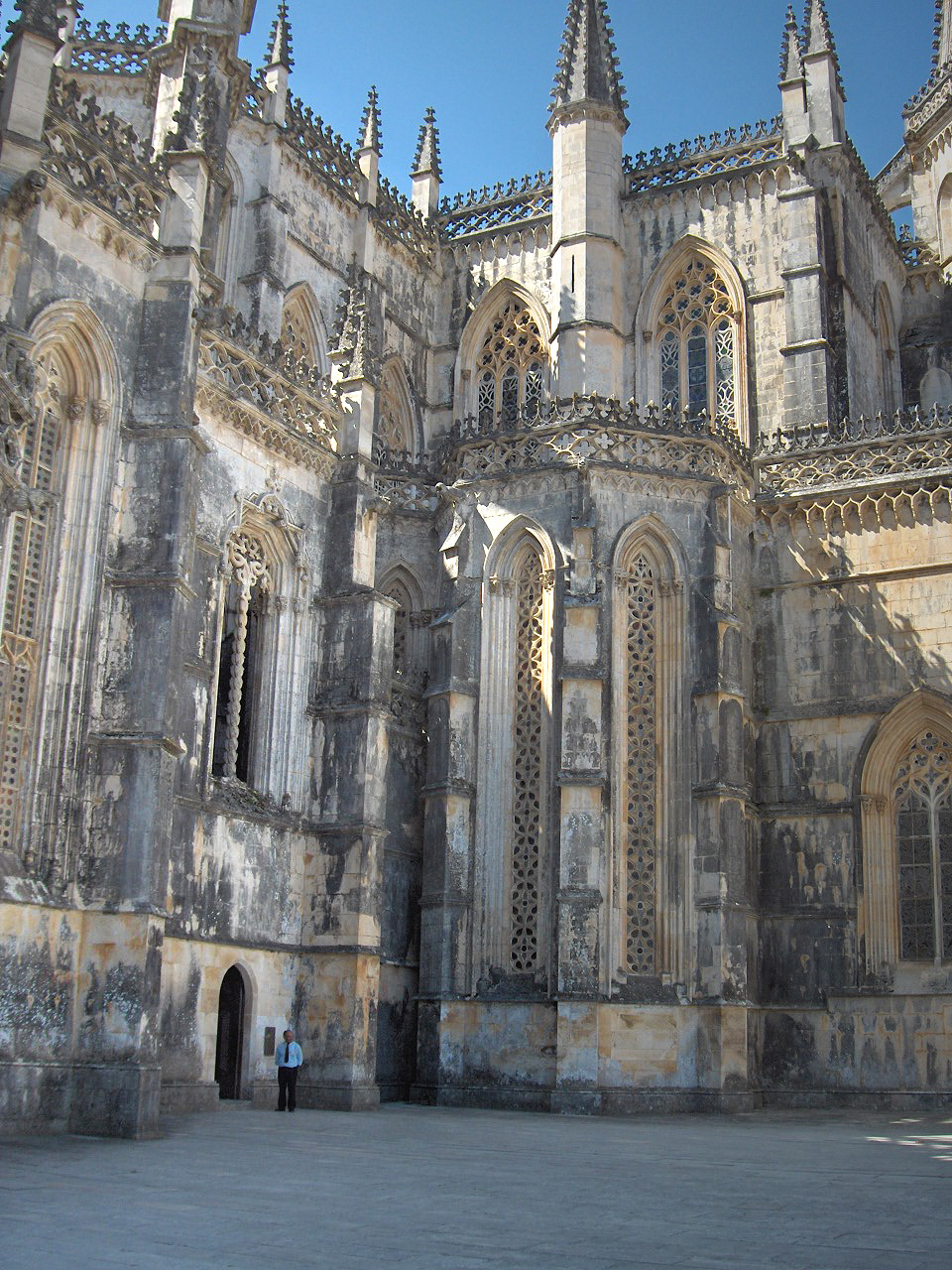
Details of Gothic architecture in the Monastery of Batalha

- Batalha Monastery
- Estátua Equestre de São Nuno de Santa Maria (1966–1968)
- Igreja Matriz de Exaltação de Santa Cruz (1514–1532)
- Capela da Santa Casa da Misericórdia (18th century)
- Ponte da Boutaca (1862)
- Pelourinho (Restored in 2000)
- Edifício Mouzinho de Albuquerque – Galeria de Exposições
- Capela de Nossa Senhora do Caminho
- Boca da Mina das Barrojeiras
- Igreja Paroquial Nossa Senhora dos Remédios
- Ermida de Nossa Senhora do Fetal
- Moinhos de Vento

== Natural heritage ==
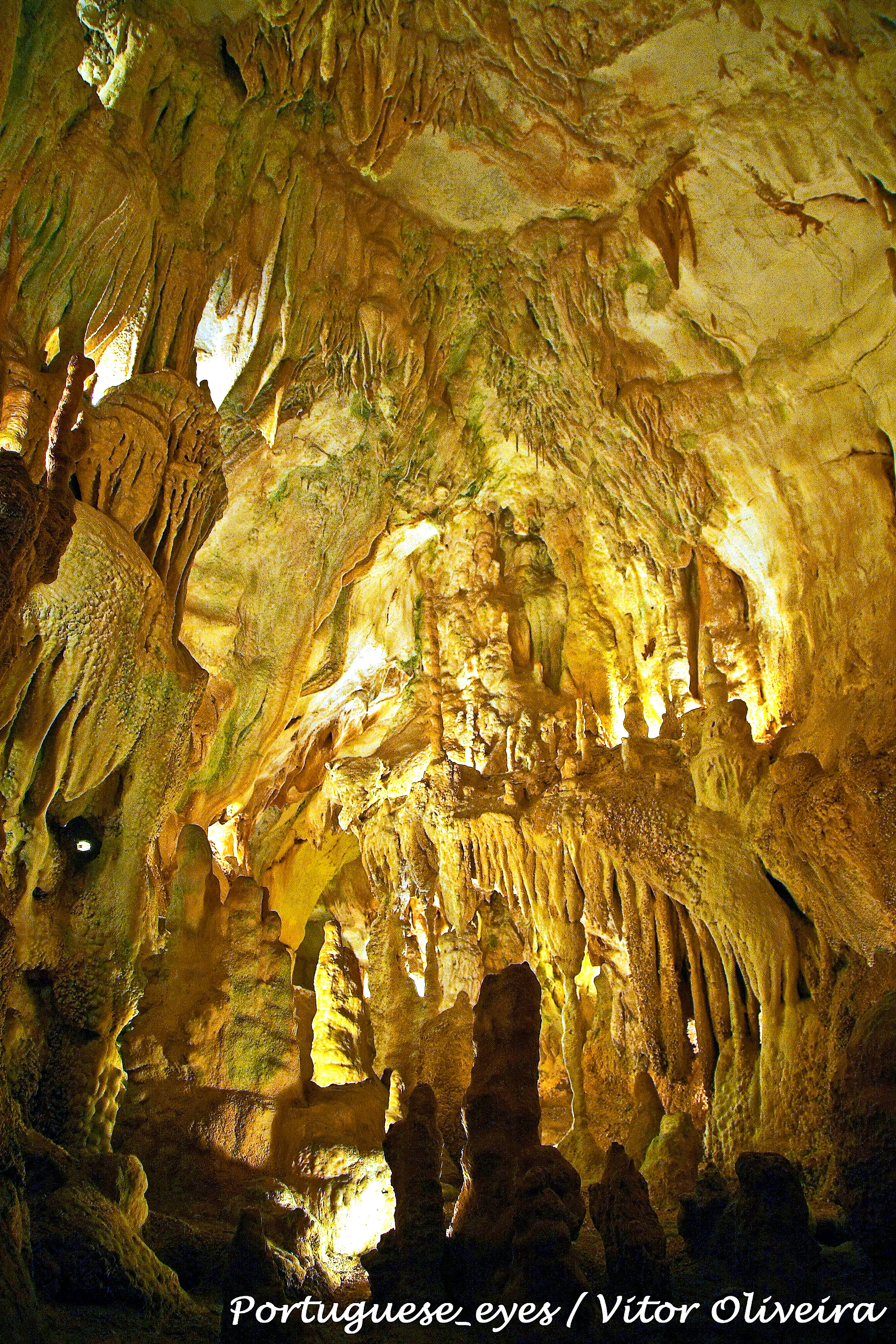
Grutas da Moeda

- Grutas da Moeda
- Estremadura Limestone Massif
- Buraco Roto
- Pia da Ovelha
- Escarpa de falha do Reguengo do Fetal

== Parishes ==
Administratively, the municipality is divided into 4 civil parishes (freguesias):

- Batalha
- Golpilheira
- Reguengo do Fetal
- São Mamede

== Twin towns – sister cities ==
Batalha is twinned with:

- Trujillo, Spain (since 1992)
- Joinville-le-Pont, France (since 2008)

== Notable people ==
- Joaquim Augusto Mouzinho de Albuquerque (1855 in Batalha – 1902) a Portuguese cavalry officer.
- Olegário Benquerença (born 1969 in Batalha) a retired Portuguese football referee.
