= Castanheira de Pera =

- Municipality
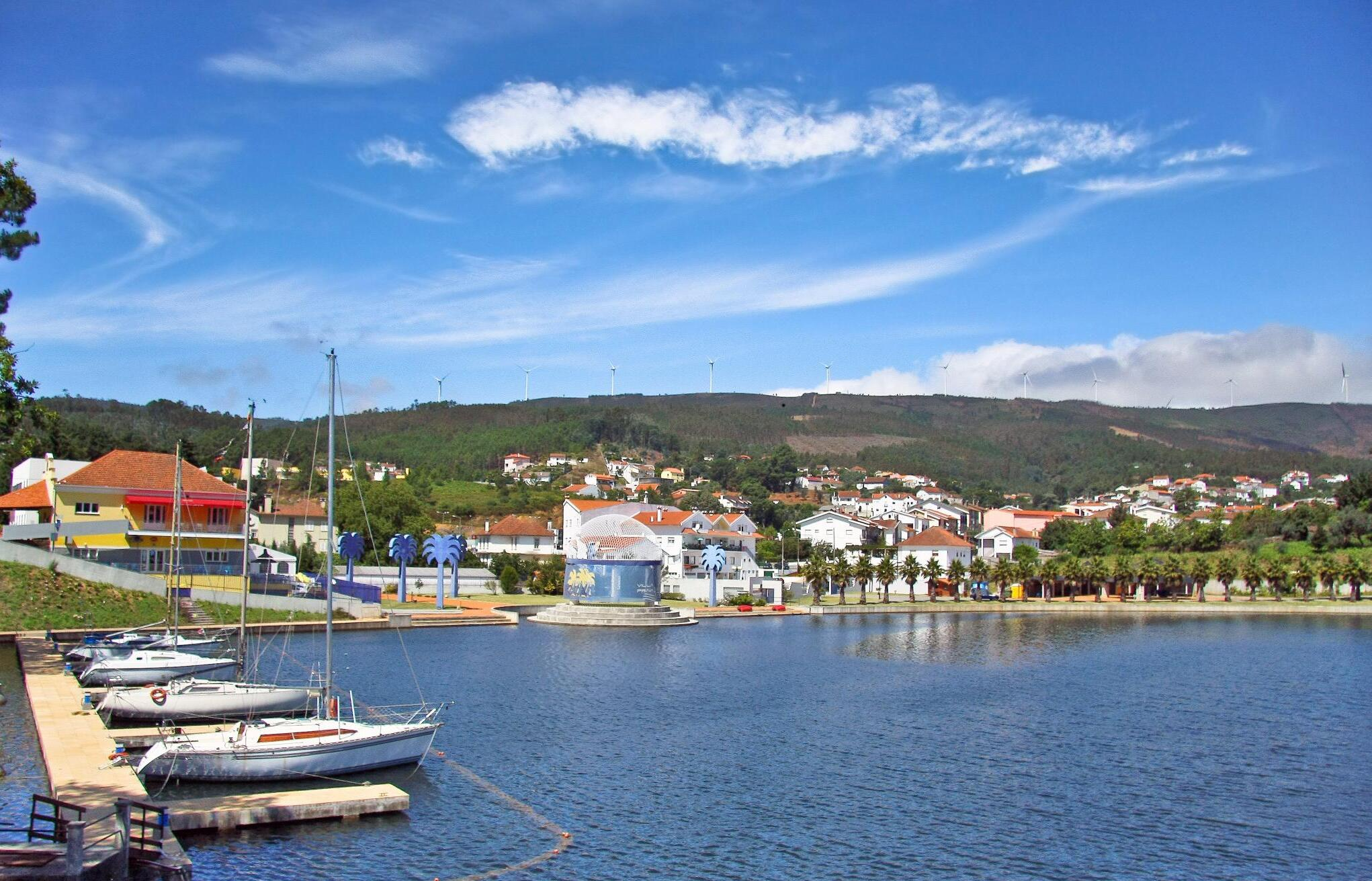

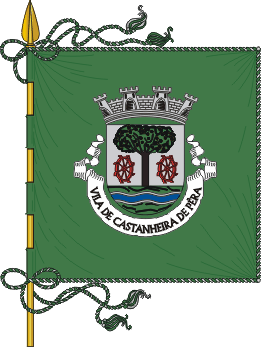
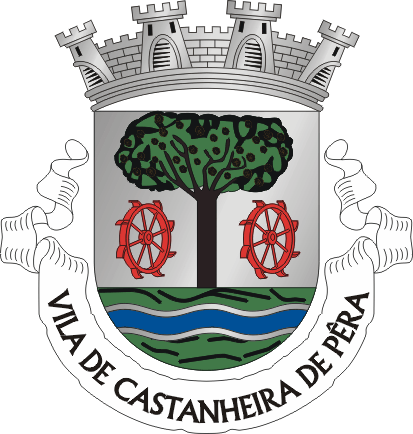
- Flag Coat of arms
- Interactive map of Castanheira de Pera
- Location in Portugal
- Coordinates: 40°00′N 8°13′W
- Country: Portugal
- Region: Centro
- Intermunic. comm.: Região de Leiria
- District: Leiria
- Parishes: 1

Government
  - President: Fernando José Pires Lopes (PS)

Area
  - Total: 66.77 km^{2} (25.78 sq mi)

Population (2011)
  - Total: 3,191
  - Density: 47.79/km^{2} (123.8/sq mi)
- Time zone: UTC+00:00 (WET)
  - Summer (DST): UTC+01:00 (WEST)
- Local holiday: July 4
- Website: http://www.cm-castanheiradepera.pt

Castanheira de Pera (Portuguese pronunciation: [kɐʃtɐˈɲɐjɾɐ ðɨ ˈpeɾɐ]), often erroneously written Castanheira de Pêra, is a Portuguese municipality in the historical Beira Litoral province, in Central Region and district of Leiria. The population in 2011 was 3,191, in an area of 66.77 km².

The present Mayor is Fernando José Pires Lopes, elected by the Socialist Party. The municipal holiday is on July 4.

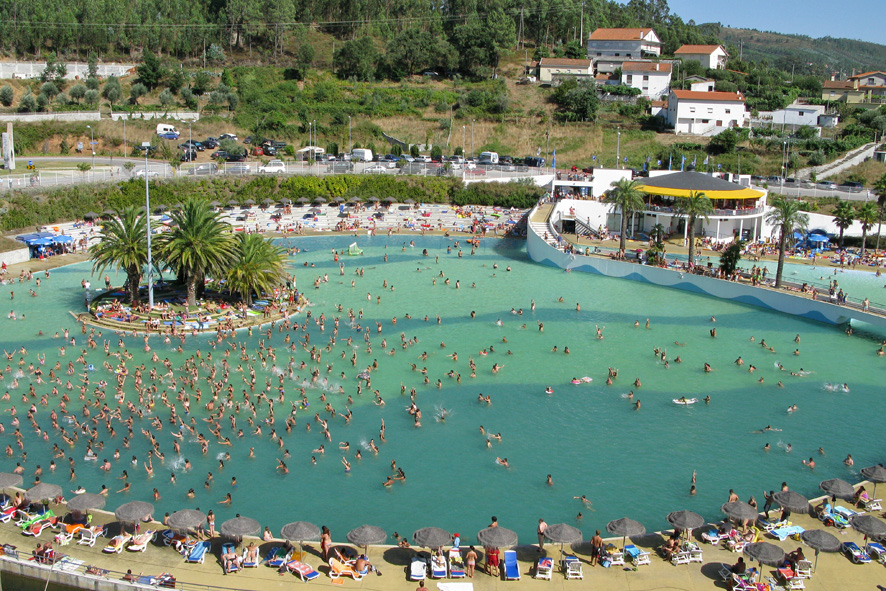
Roca's Beach

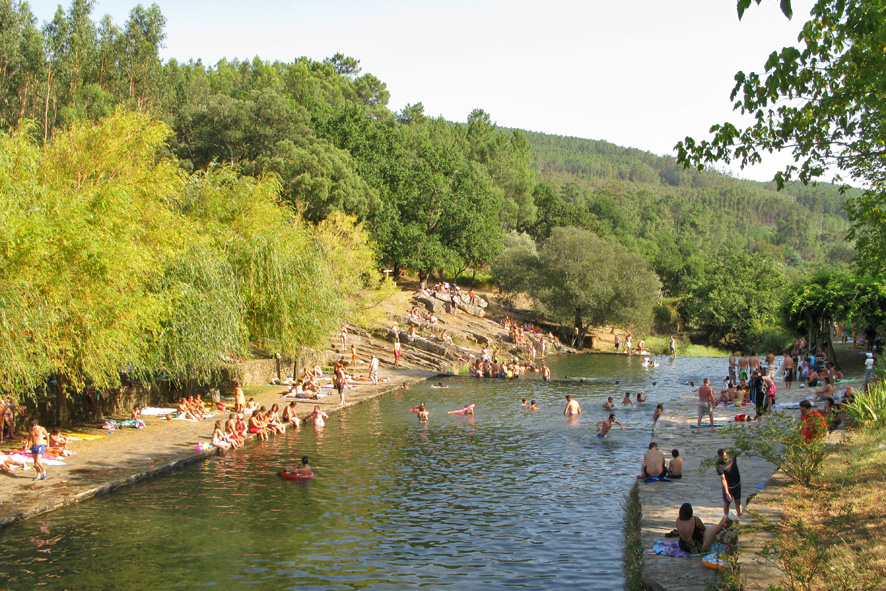
Corga

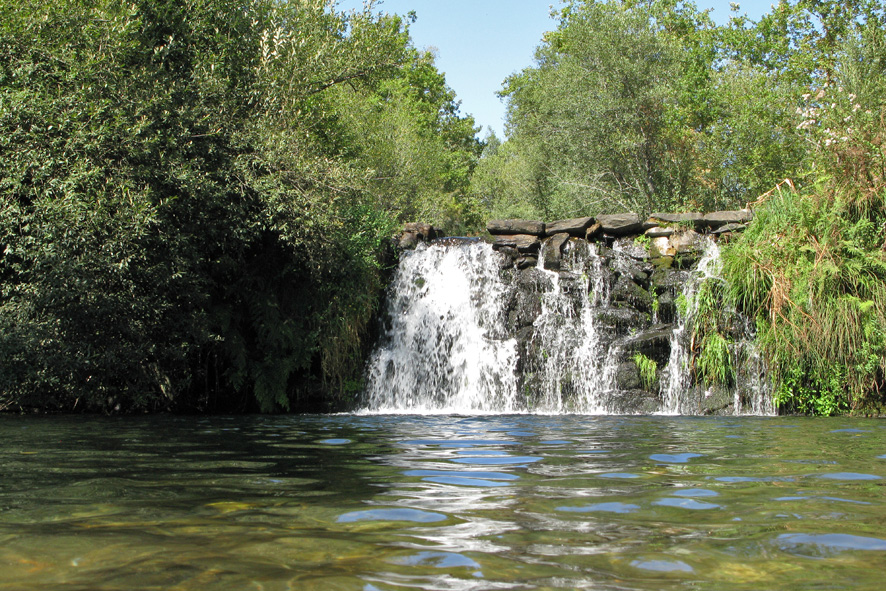
Véras

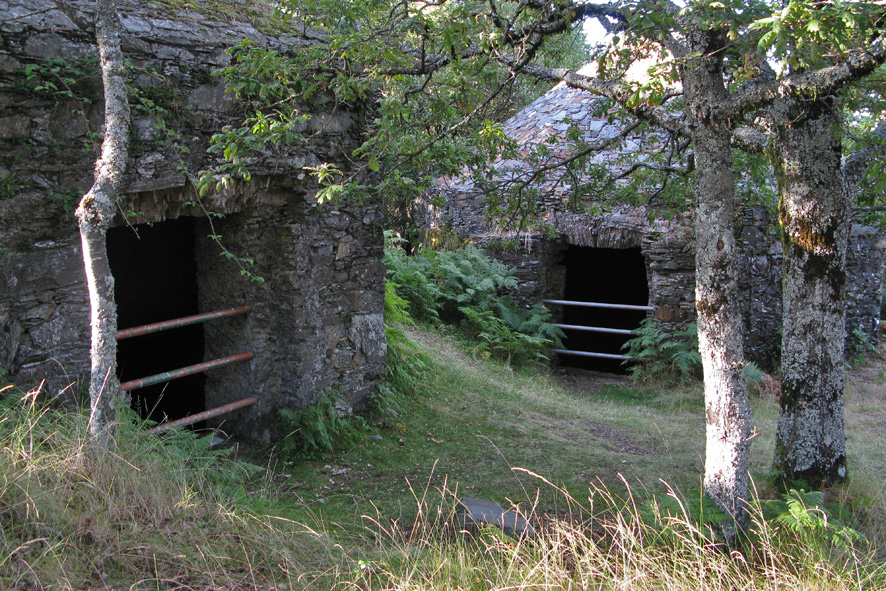
St. António da Neve

== Parishes ==
Administratively, the municipality consists of 1 civil parish (freguesia):

- Castanheira de Pera e Coentral

== Climate ==
Climate data for Castanheira de Pera, 1934-1960 normals, 1981-2021 precipitation
Month	Jan	Feb	Mar	Apr	May	Jun	Jul	Aug	Sep	Oct	Nov	Dec	Year
Mean daily maximum °C (°F)	13.7 (56.7)	15.3 (59.5)	17.7 (63.9)	20.7 (69.3)	22.4 (72.3)	26.9 (80.4)	30.2 (86.4)	30.7 (87.3)	28.2 (82.8)	23.2 (73.8)	17.9 (64.2)	14.4 (57.9)	21.8 (71.2)
Daily mean °C (°F)	8.9 (48.0)	9.9 (49.8)	12.2 (54.0)	14.6 (58.3)	16.2 (61.2)	19.9 (67.8)	22.4 (72.3)	22.7 (72.9)	20.8 (69.4)	17.0 (62.6)	12.6 (54.7)	9.4 (48.9)	15.6 (60.0)
Mean daily minimum °C (°F)	4.1 (39.4)	4.5 (40.1)	6.8 (44.2)	8.4 (47.1)	10.0 (50.0)	12.9 (55.2)	14.5 (58.1)	14.7 (58.5)	13.4 (56.1)	10.7 (51.3)	7.4 (45.3)	4.4 (39.9)	9.3 (48.8)
Average precipitation mm (inches)	207.2 (8.16)	174.8 (6.88)	103.1 (4.06)	155.8 (6.13)	144.5 (5.69)	52.1 (2.05)	11.5 (0.45)	16.3 (0.64)	60.1 (2.37)	175.9 (6.93)	195.9 (7.71)	231.6 (9.12)	1,528.8 (60.19)
Average relative humidity (%)	80	76	72	68	69	60	60	60	65	72	78	80	70
Source: Portuguese Environment Agency

== Notable people ==
- Kalidás Barreto (1932–2020) a Portuguese accountant and trade unionist; active in Castanheira de Pera where he died
- João Carvalho (born 1997) a Portuguese footballer with nearly 200 club caps, he plays for Nottingham Forest F.C.
