= Castle of Belver =

Medieval castle in Gavião, Portalegre, Portugal

- Castelo de Belver
- Portalegre, Alto Alentejo, Alentejo in Portugal
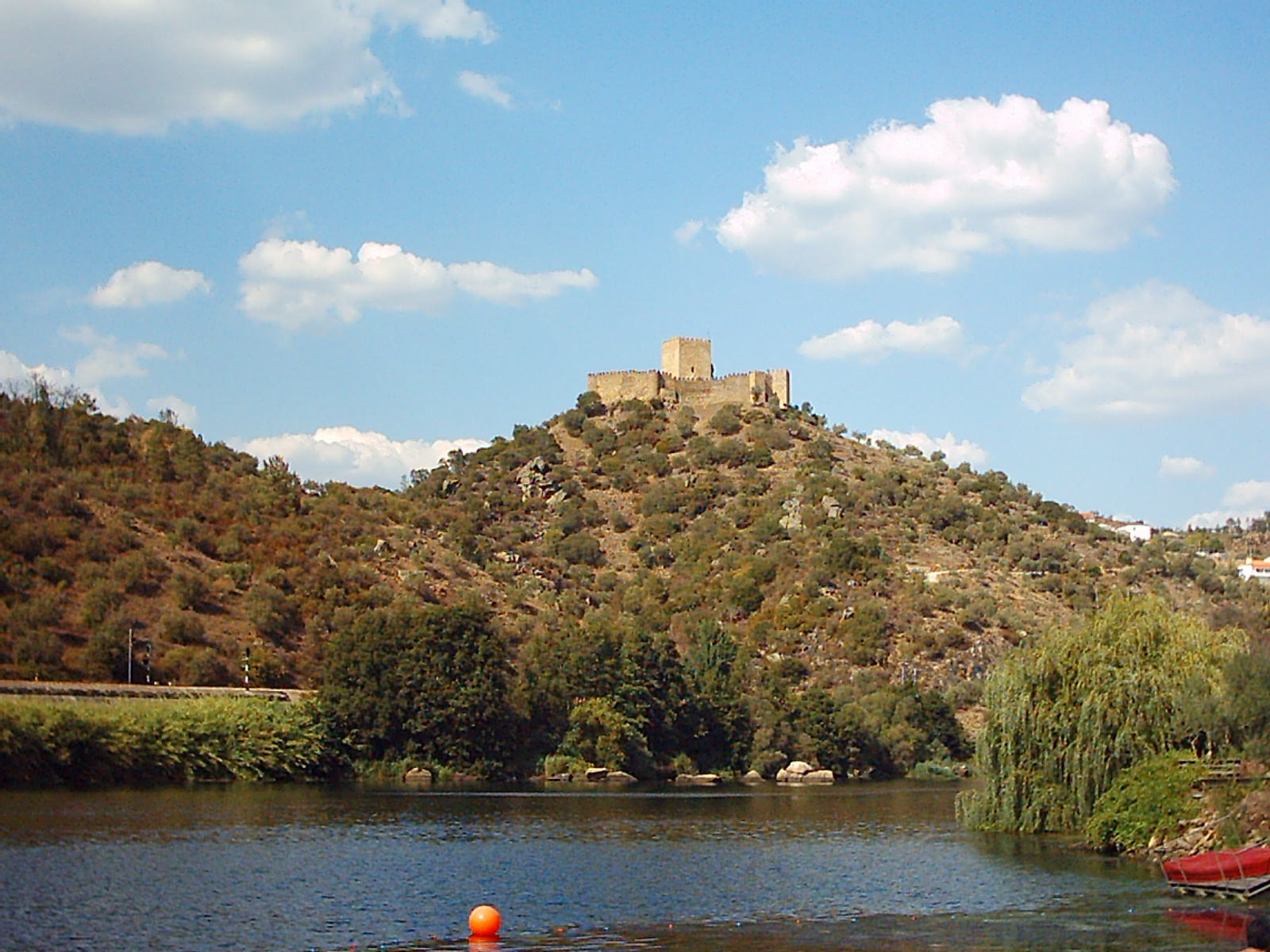
- The imposing medieval fortifications of Belver overlooking the river valley below

Site information
- Type: Castle
- Owner: Portuguese Republic
- Open to the public: Public

Location
- Coordinates: 39°29′37.93″N 7°57′39.25″W

Site history
- Built: c. 1194
- Materials: Stone, Rock, Tile

The Castle of Belver (Portuguese: Castelo de Belver) is a Portuguese castle in the civil parish of Belver, municipality of Gavião, district of Portalegre, in central Portugal.

== History ==
Belver was the first castle and most important to be constructed by the Hospitallers in Portugal during the Middle Ages. It was built in order to defend the access-way along the Tagus River, and donate by Sancho I under the condition that a castle be constructed. In 1194, King Sancho conceded this region of the Northern Tagus River, then known as Guidintesta, or Guidi in testa (or still of Costa), to Afonso Paes, prior of the Order of the Hospitallers. By so doing, the King hoped to stabilize the Christian-Muslim frontier along the Tagus River, leaving the Templar to almost monopolize their power along the frontier lands. The King began referring to the construction of the Castle and the surrounding as Belver. In his later testament, King Sancho transferred the title of the Castle to the Hospitalers. By 1210, construction was far enough advanced to allow the permanent occupation and defence. The testament while identifying its existence, also made it clear that the Castle was one of the six repositories of the nation's wealth, thereby providing ample proof of the Castle's defences, albeit located in a frontier outpost. The final construction was completed in 1212.

Between 1336 and 1341, Belver fell under the most important command of the Hospitallers, while still not seat nor official House, which continued to reside in the town of Leça do Balio. Even as the head of the Order transferred his rule to the parish of Flor da Rosa, in the municipality of Crato, creating the priorship of Crato, the Castle of Belver (and its community) did not progress more than a provincial stronghold.

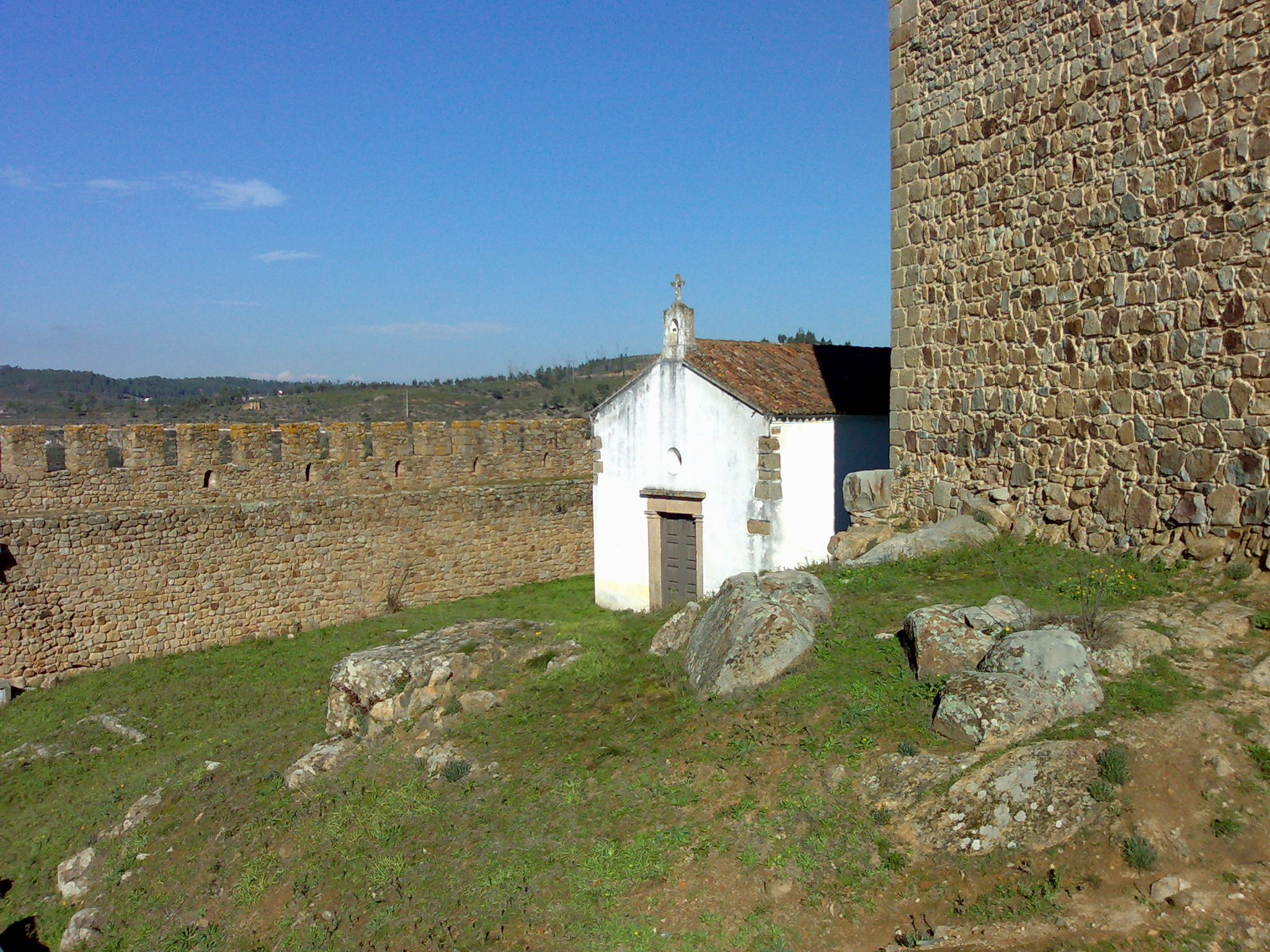
Located outside the keep walls, the small chapel of Sáo Brás

The fortress remained intact over the following centuries, preserving many of the primitive Romanesque military motifs of the period. In fact, the castle was systematically adapted to military conditions of the time, while garrison accommodations were improved. After becoming King, John I of Portugal renewed the Castle's important military role, and in the face of Castilian conflicts, had the Castle's defenses expanded and rehabilitated, under the direction of Nuno Alvares Pereira (in 1390). In the 16th century, the Chapel of São Brás, was completed. Similar renovations occurred in the 17th century, by Cosmander.

By the 19th century, the Castle, apart from its imposing form above the parish of Belver, was completely forgotten, becoming a shelter for the settlement's cemetery in 1846.

The 1909 earthquake caused major damage to the fortifications, but only resulted in major re-construction between 1939 and 1946, when the DGEMN- Direcção Geral dos Edifícios e Monumentos Nacionais also continued to work on the Castle grounds annually, rehabilitate, demolish and erect major facets of the Castle. Similarly, in 1976, the walls and roof were repaired, while the door to the chapel and altar were renovated, and in 1986, while lighting was updated on the grounds, the roof was repaired once more. In 1987-1988, repairs to the donjon (plaster, masonry and pavement) were completed.

On 1 June 1992, the property was transferred to the IPPAR (Instituto Português do Património Arquitectónico), under decree-law 106F/92. The institute, before being absorbed into the IGESPAR, was responsible for a complete restoration and conservation of the Castle.

== Architecture ==
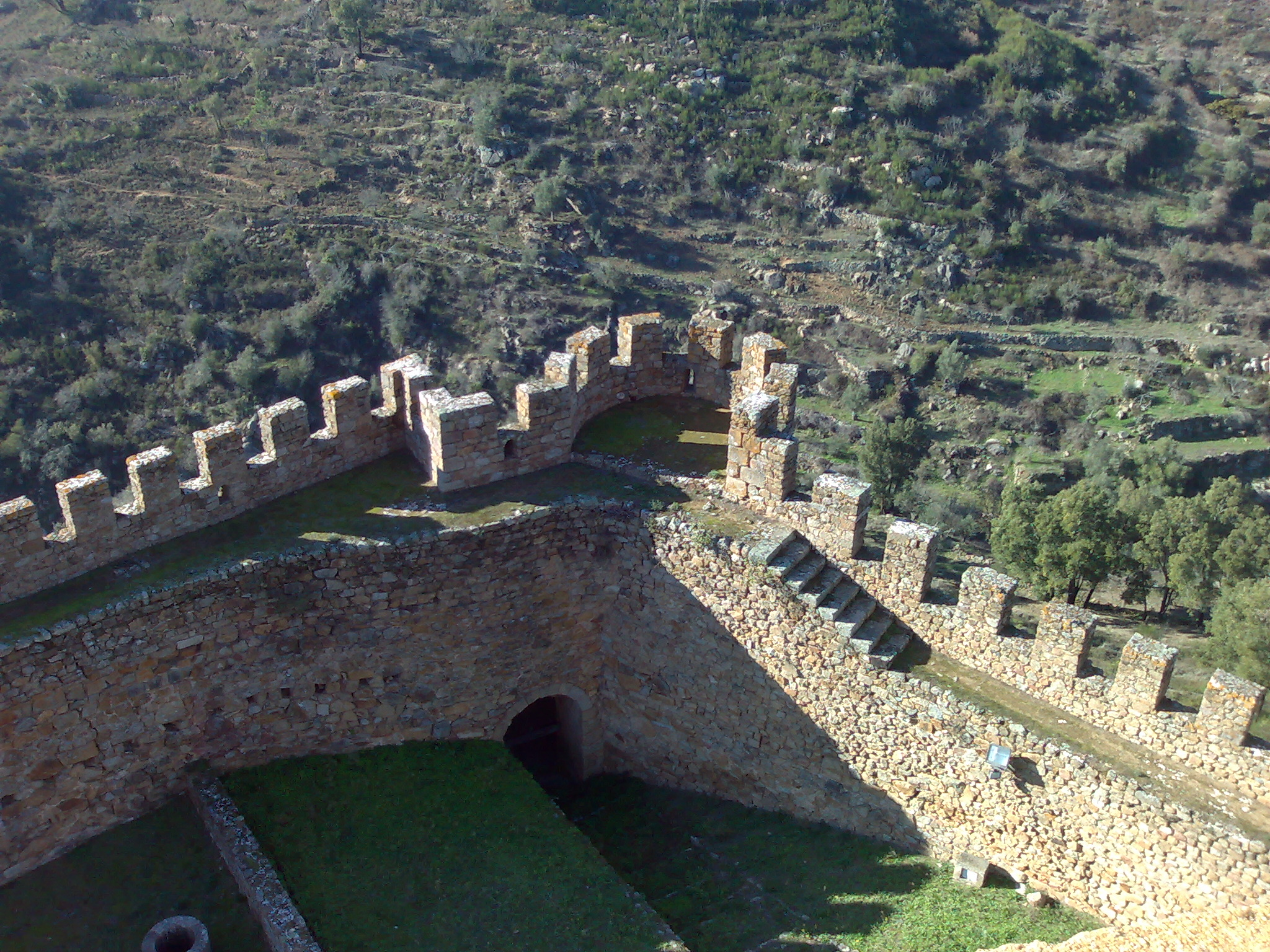
Detail of the walls overlooking the Tagus River

Located on the periphery of the village of Belver (isolated on the south-west corner), alongside the right margin of the Tagus River, at the confluence of the Ribeiro de Belver, overlooking a panorama, that includes olive orchards to the east and south-east.

Its plan includes a principal rectangular keep circuited by walled parapets, that encircle the space on the hilltop, and Renaissance-era chapel. The castle gates are located on the south face, anticipated by a staircase of masonry stone, and flanked by two towers, whose design would be used by King Denis. Beyond the entrance is a triple doorway of rounded arcs, which now provides entry onto the grounds. Central to the completed structure is the donjon or keep, whose first floor provides a grated access-way to the dungeons. The keep's entrance-hall has a rectangular window and staircase that provides access to the second floor. The second-floor hall, also with a rectangular window and arched doorway, leads onto the vestiges of the veranda, while another doorway leads to the superior floor access to the battlements.

The walls and battlements which encircle the Castle follow a semi-circular oval around the keep, and are covered in parapets and turrets, with strategically place cubicle towers located around the entranceway and in each direction of the compass. The Traitor's Gate, the secondary access to the castle, is located on the cliff side of the structure, guarded by a round tower.

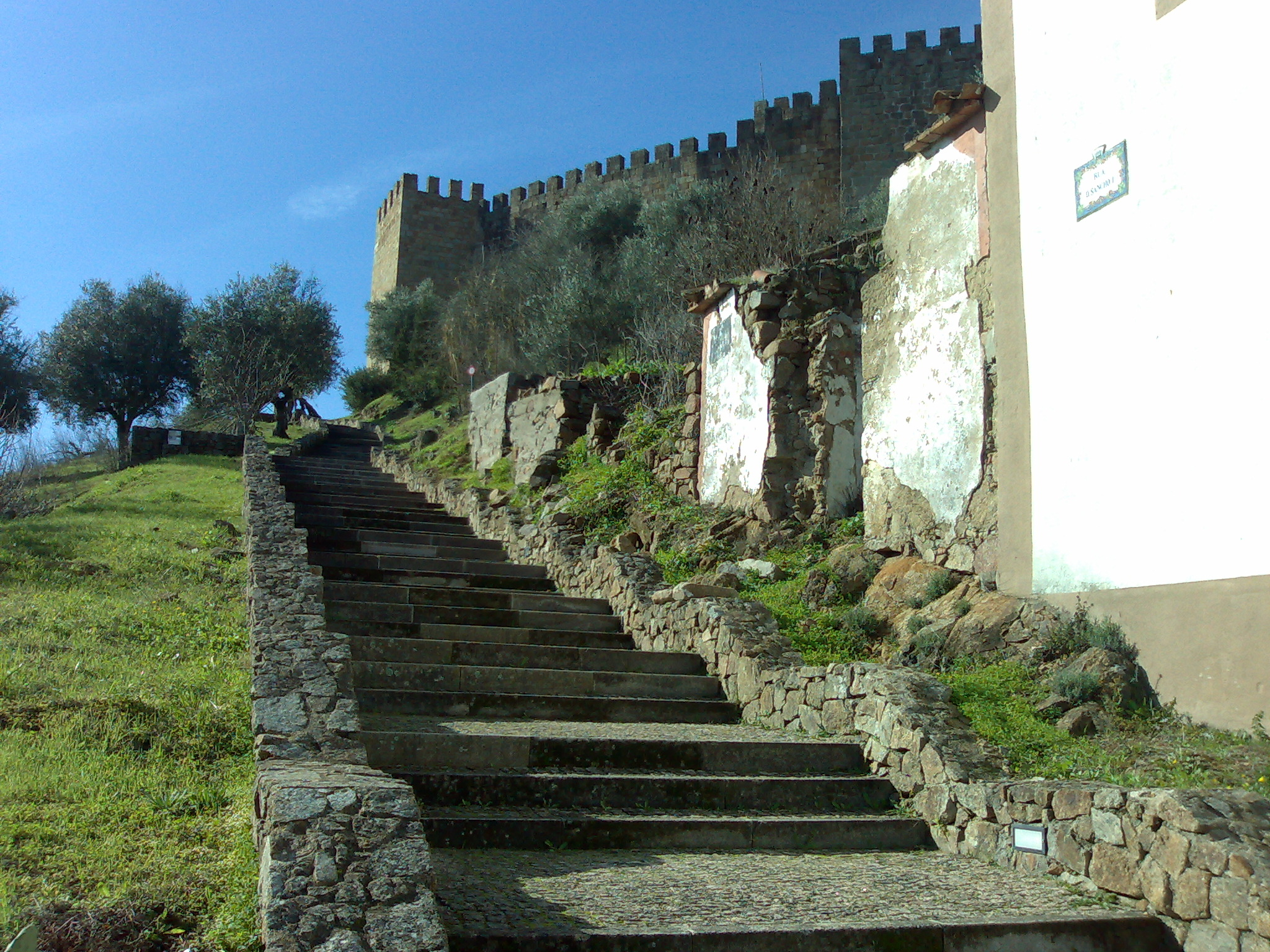
The main staircase leading to the doorway

Remains of the alcaide's residence and garrison are located in the south-east, south and south-west parts of the castle, in the space occupied by the three archways. To the north is the remains of the garrison's cistern, constructed during the remodelling of the castle by Nuno Álvares Pereira.

Near the centre of the Castle, and in the east, is the Chapel of São Brás, alongside the keep. In the interior of chapel is a high-altar, with a number of busts and reliquaries from Palestine, presented by the Great Prior of Crato to Prince Luís, son of Manuel I of Portugal. Italian counterparts, and decorated with the grande importance associated with the religiosity of the legendary reliquaries of the Holy Land.
