= Belver (Gavião) =

- Civil parish
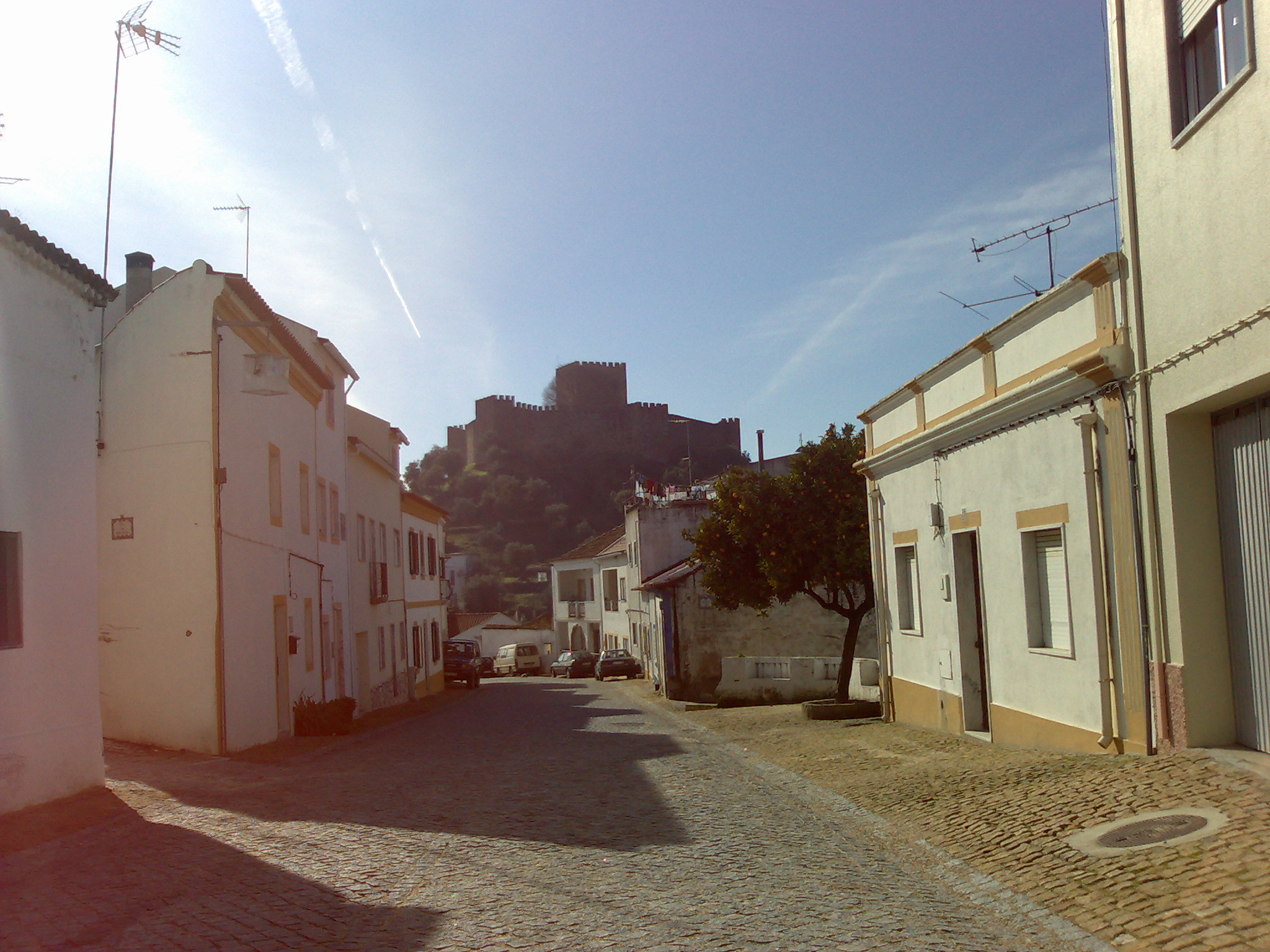
- A view of the old town and the medieval Castle of Belver

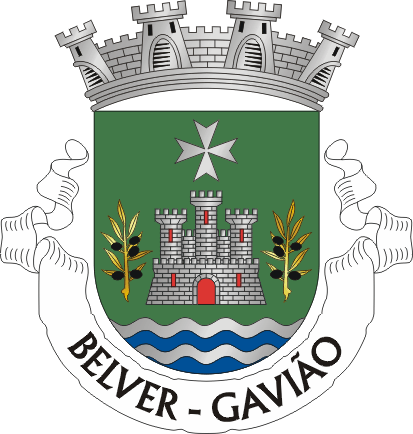
- Coat of arms

- Location in Portugal
- Coordinates: 39.495°N 7.959°W
- Country: Portugal
- Region: Alentejo
- Intermunic. comm.: Alto Alentejo
- District: Portalegre
- Municipality: Gavião

Area
  - Total: 69.84 km^{2} (26.97 sq mi)
- Elevation: 230 m (750 ft)

Population (2011)
  - Total: 684
  - Density: 9.79/km^{2} (25.4/sq mi)
- Time zone: UTC+00:00 (WET)
  - Summer (DST): UTC+01:00 (WEST)
- Postal code: 6040
- Area code: 241
- Patron: Nossa Senhora da Visitação
- Website: http://www.jf-belver.pt/

Belver is a Portuguese civil parish in the municipality of Gavião, district of Portalegre. The population in 2011 was 684, in an area of 69.84 km^{2}. It is situated along the northern bank of the Tagus River.

== History ==
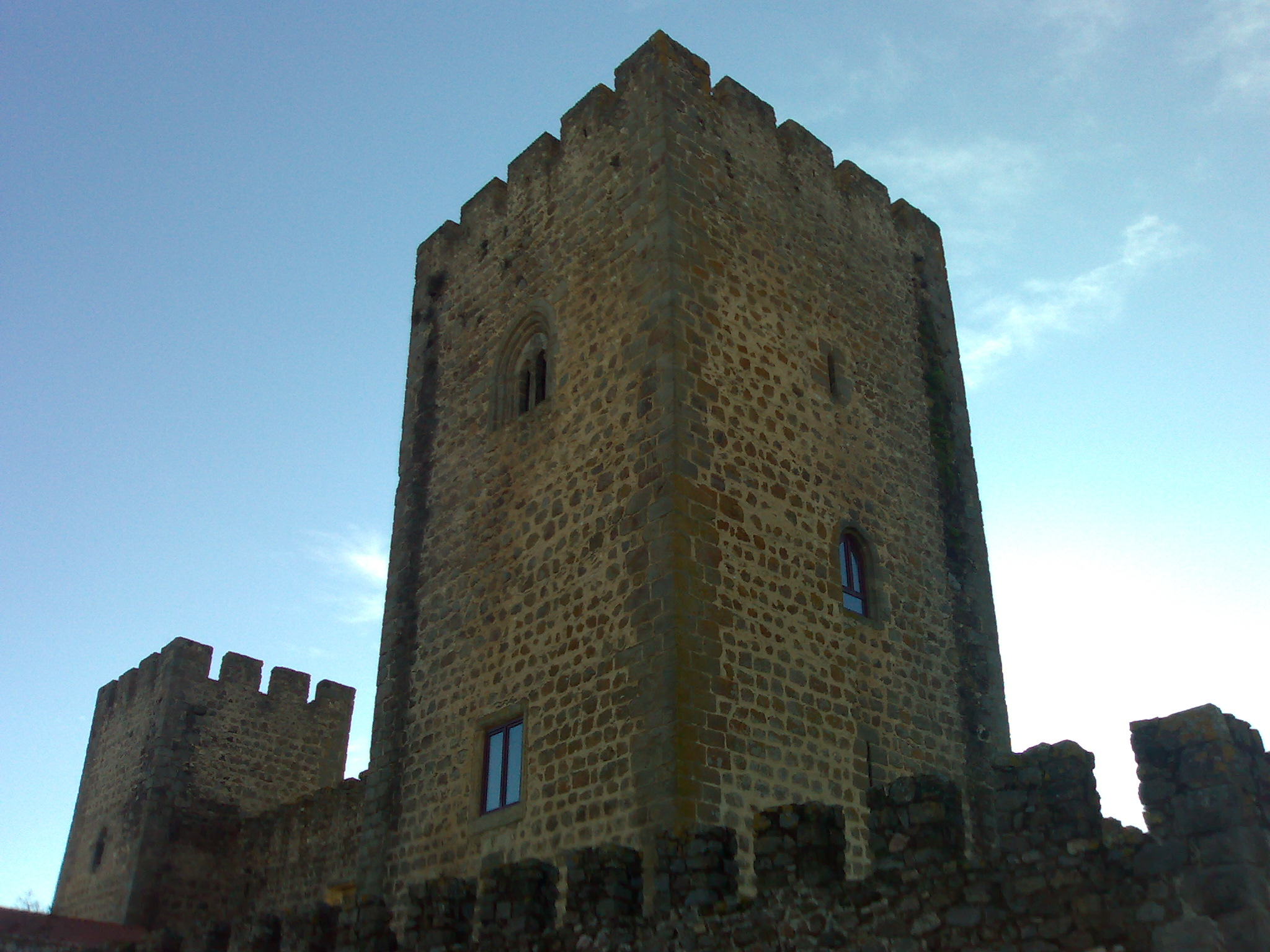
The keep tower of the Castle of Belver, constructed by the Knights Hospitaller

On 13 June 1194, the region of Belver was donated by King Sancho I of Portugal to the Knights Hospitaller, with the condition that the knights were required to build a castle in the site.

Between 1383 and 1385, Belver aligned itself with the forces of Leonor Telles de Menezes against the Master of Avis.

In the 16th century, the parochial church was constructed. On 18 May 1518, King Manuel I of Portugal conceded a foral (charter) to Belver.

In the 17th century, the village was surveyed by Pedro Nunes Tinoco, and determined to be under the authority of the Priory of Crato.

In 1836, the municipality of Belver was extinguished and the region was integrated into the municipality of Mação. This remained in effect until the end of the century, when in 1898 it was integrated into the municipality of Gavião.

In 1905 a bridge was completed over the Ribeira de Belver.

== Geography ==
Belver is the northernmost civil parish of the municipality, and the only on the northern margin of the Tagus River (the remaining parishes of Gavião are on lands south of the Tagus). It is bordered by Gavião and Atalaia parishes (in the south), while surrounded by the parishes of Envendos, Mação and Ortiga (in the neighbouring municipality of Mação) to the northeast, north and northwest, respectively. It is located 5 kilometres (3.1 mi) from the urban centre of Gavião along the left margin of the Tagus.

The parish is situated in river valley, 500 metres (1,600 ft) from the right margin of the Tagus River, along the confluence of the Ribeira de Belver. Its highest elevation is occupied by the 150 metres (490 ft) hilltop surmounted by the Castle of Belver, while the urban area is 125 metres (410 ft) above sea level. Surrounding these hilltops are several olive orchards.

It is accessible by rail-link (the Beira Baixa railway), with its stop in the city centre. Alternatively, the main access is along the A23/IP6/E806 motorway (Auto-Estrada da Beira-Interior), passing through the northern part of the parish, then 5.5 kilometres (3.4 mi) south to the Tagus basin.

== Architecture ==
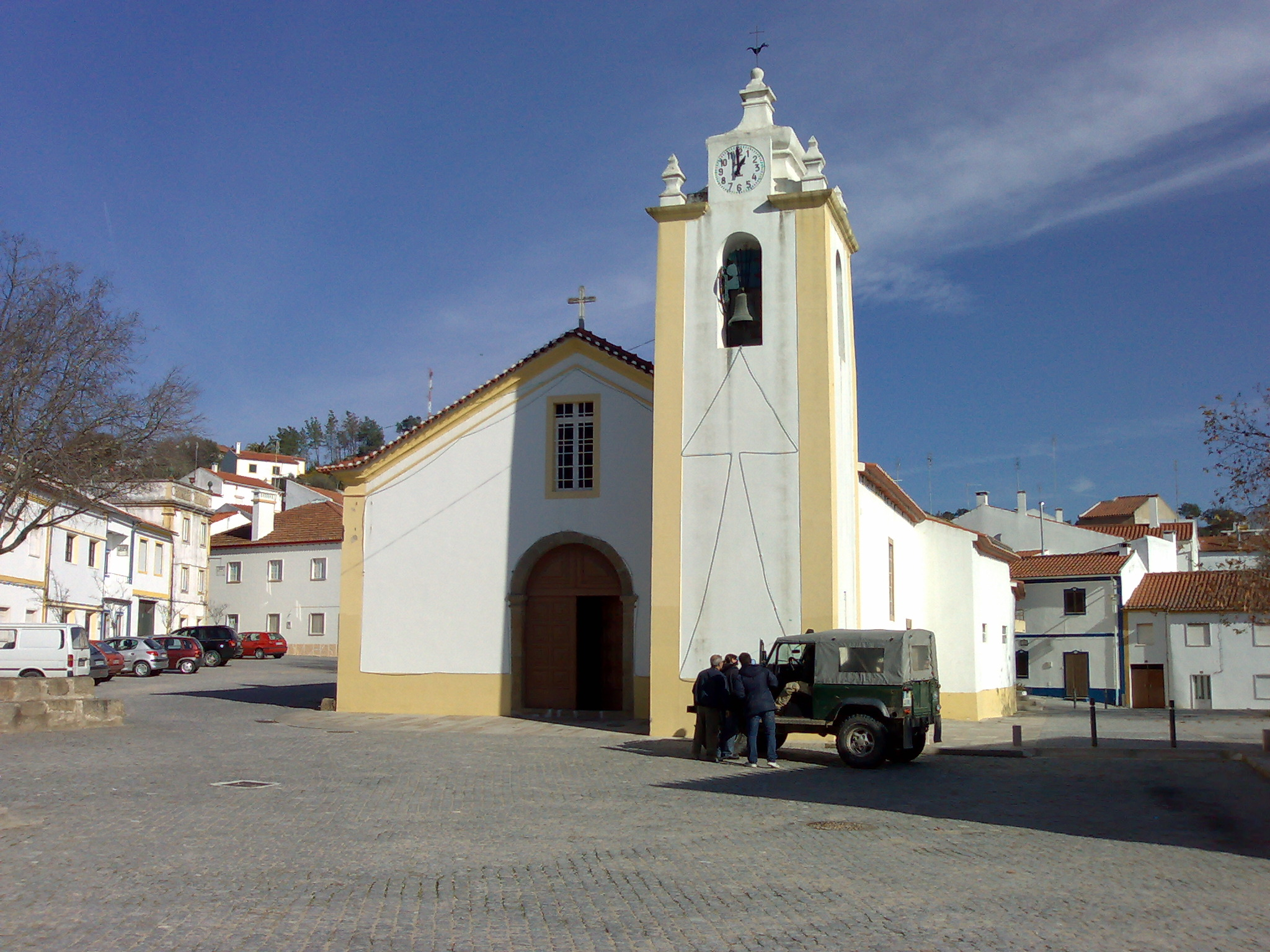
The parochial Church of Nossa Senhora da Visitação

=== Archaeological ===
- Dolmen of Penedo Gordo (Portuguese: Anta de Penedo Gordo)

=== Civic ===
- Belver Dam (Portuguese: Barragem do Belver)
- Domingos da Vinha Museum (Portuguese: Museu de Domingos da Vinha)
- Old Fountain (Degracia) (Portuguese: Fonte Velha em Degracia)

=== Military ===
- Castle of Belver (Portuguese: Castelo de Belver)

=== Religious ===
- Chapel of São Brás (Portuguese: Capela de São Brás)
- Church of Nossa Senhora da Visitação (Portuguese: Igreja Paroquial de Belver/Igreja de Nossa Senhora da Visitação)
- Hermitage of Nossa Senhora do Pilar (Portuguese: Ermida de Nossa Senhora do Pilar)
