= Ponte de Sor, Tramaga e Vale de Açor =

- Civil parish
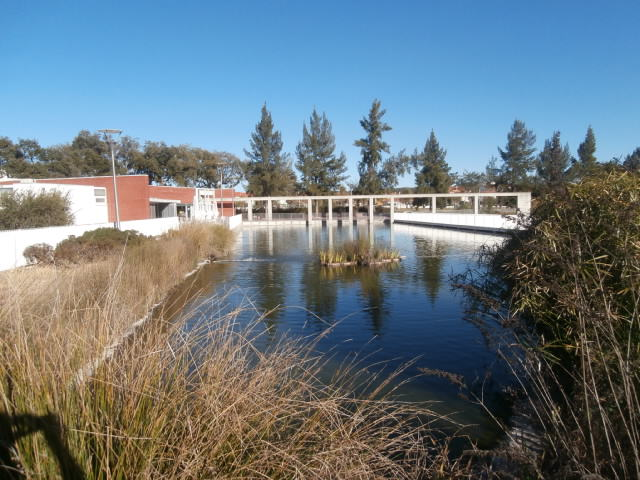

- Location in Portugal
- Coordinates: 39.248°N 8.013°W
- Country: Portugal
- Region: Alentejo
- Intermunic. comm.: Alto Alentejo
- District: Portalegre
- Municipality: Ponte de Sor

Area
  - Total: 331.71 km^{2} (128.07 sq mi)

Population (2011)
  - Total: 11,198
  - Density: 33.758/km^{2} (87.434/sq mi)
- Time zone: UTC+00:00 (WET)
  - Summer (DST): UTC+01:00 (WEST)

Ponte de Sor, Tramaga e Vale de Açor is one of the parishes located in Ponte de Sor Municipality, Portugal. The population in 2011 was 11,198, in an area of 331.71 km^{2}.
