= Foros de Arrão =

- Civil parish
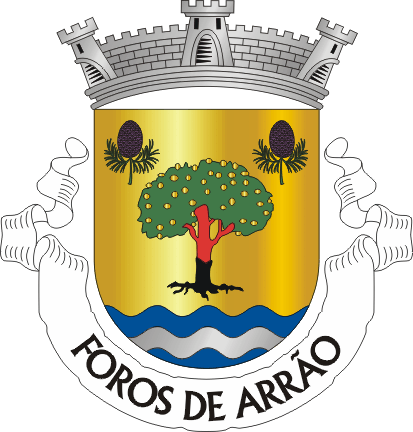
- Coat of arms

- Location in Portugal
- Coordinates: 39.178°N 8.241°W
- Country: Portugal
- Region: Alentejo
- Intermunic. comm.: Alto Alentejo
- District: Portalegre
- Municipality: Ponte de Sor

Area
  - Total: 84.26 km^{2} (32.53 sq mi)

Population (2011)
  - Total: 919
  - Density: 11/km^{2} (28/sq mi)
- Time zone: UTC+00:00 (WET)
  - Summer (DST): UTC+01:00 (WEST)

Foros de Arrão is a village and a civil parish of the municipality of Ponte de Sor, Portugal. The population in 2011 was 919, in an area of 84.26 km^{2}.
