= Longomel =

- Civil parish
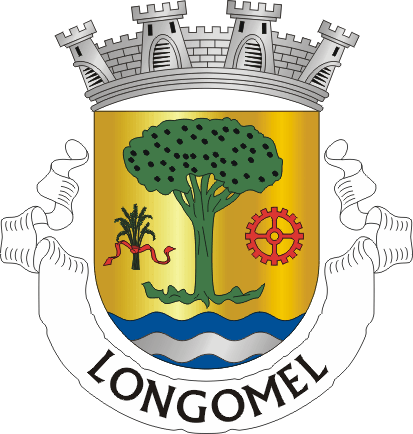
- Coat of arms

- Location in Portugal
- Coordinates: 39°20′N 8°0′W
- Country: Portugal
- Region: Alentejo
- Intermunic. comm.: Alto Alentejo
- District: Portalegre
- Municipality: Ponte de Sor

Area
  - Total: 46.19 km^{2} (17.83 sq mi)

Population (2011)
  - Total: 1,228
  - Density: 27/km^{2} (69/sq mi)
- Time zone: UTC+00:00 (WET)
  - Summer (DST): UTC+01:00 (WEST)

Longomel is a village and a civil parish of the municipality of Ponte de Sor, Portugal. The population in 2011 was 1,228, in an area of 46.19 km^{2}.
