= Comenda (Gavião) =

- Civil parish
- Location in Portugal
- Coordinates: 39.398°N 7.781°W
- Country: Portugal
- Region: Alentejo
- Intermunic. comm.: Alto Alentejo
- District: Portalegre
- Municipality: Gavião

Area
  - Total: 90.02 km^{2} (34.76 sq mi)

Population (2011)
  - Total: 890
  - Density: 9.9/km^{2} (26/sq mi)
- Time zone: UTC+00:00 (WET)
  - Summer (DST): UTC+01:00 (WEST)

Comenda is a civil parish in the municipality of Gavião, Portugal. The population in 2011 was 890, in an area of 90.02 km^{2}.
