= Margem =

- Civil parish
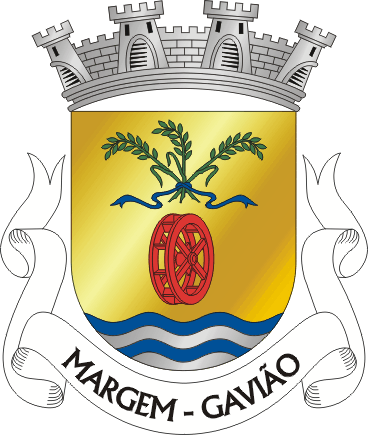
- Coat of arms

- Location in Portugal
- Coordinates: 39.381°N 7.900°W
- Country: Portugal
- Region: Alentejo
- Intermunic. comm.: Alto Alentejo
- District: Portalegre
- Municipality: Gavião

Area
  - Total: 56.85 km^{2} (21.95 sq mi)

Population (2011)
  - Total: 811
  - Density: 14/km^{2} (37/sq mi)
- Time zone: UTC+00:00 (WET)
  - Summer (DST): UTC+01:00 (WEST)

Margem is a civil parish in the municipality of Gavião, Portugal. The population in 2011 was 811, in an area of 56.85 km^{2}.
