= Santo Amaro (Sousel) =

- Civil parish
- Location in Portugal
- Coordinates: 38.969°N 7.583°W
- Country: Portugal
- Region: Alentejo
- Intermunic. comm.: Alto Alentejo
- District: Portalegre
- Municipality: Sousel

Area
  - Total: 39.61 km^{2} (15.29 sq mi)

Population (2011)
  - Total: 644
  - Density: 16.3/km^{2} (42.1/sq mi)
- Time zone: UTC+00:00 (WET)
  - Summer (DST): UTC+01:00 (WEST)

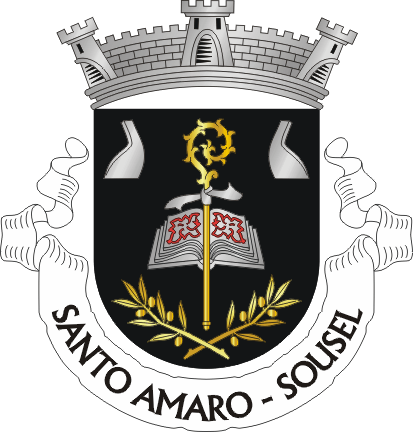
Heraldic symbol of Santo Amaro

Santo Amaro is a Portuguese parish in the municipality of Sousel. The population in 2011 was 644, in an area of 39.61 km^{2}.
