= Castle of Seda =

Medieval castle in Seda, Alter do Chão, Portugal

- Castelo de Seda
- Portalegre, Alto Alentejo, Alentejo in Portugal

Site information
- Type: Castle
- Owner: Portuguese Republic
- Open to the public: Public

Location
- Coordinates: 39°11′35.163″N 7°47′13.221″W

Site history
- Materials: Schist, Limestone, Mortar

The Castle of Seda (Portuguese: Castelo de Seda) is a medieval castle located in the civil parish of Seda, in the municipality of Alter do Chão, in the Portuguese district of Portalegre.

== History ==
Between the Roman and Muslim occupations there existed a castle fortification by the name of Arminho on the site. The medieval settlement was founded on a Romanized castro, which was a 2nd century presence conditioned by its position over the Ribeira de Seda, identifiable by milestone encountered in the region, among other vestiges.

In 1160, D. Afonso Henriques conquered the settlement from the Moors. The construction of the walls likely began following its conquest, along a frontier which was still influenced skirmishes and battles. Following their defeat, the location was donated to the Knights Templar, but in 1271, Seda was transferred to the Knights of Avis; Friar Simão Soeiro, Master of the Order, received a new foral for its development.

On 18 May 1271, a foral (charter) was conceded to Father Simão, Master of Avis, which was later (30 October 1427) validated by King D. John I and reissued on 1 September 1510, by King D. Manuel I.

In the 1527 "Numeramento", it was the seat of the municipality, during the jurisdiction of the Order of Avis, when there were 184 residents.

The municipality was extinguished in 1836, with the administrative reforms.

In 1970, there was a collapse of part of the walls and corbel of the fortification. As a result, in 1971, the Direcção Geral dos Edifícios e Monumentos Nacionais (DGEMN) began the consolidation of the walls and tower. But, urgent repairs were made in 1978, that included patching of the masonry. To protect the castle from complete ruin, the government classified the castle as a Property of Public Interest by decree on 26 February 1982.

== Architecture ==
The castle is located in a rural area, delimited in the east and north by primitive houses. The walls and corbels are situated between the vegetable gardens and yards of the Rua do Castelo, while along the east is an abrupt slope, that is part of a derelict farm.

Of the castle, there remains the embattlement walls with three corbels and vestiges of a fourth. The entire structure is based on an irregular plan.

The monument is designated as a castle, but, little remains except for the walls. Rui de Azevedo who catalogued Seda as a 12th-13th century fortified settlement, indicated that it was not a castle, between 1350 and 1450, from the records of Baquero Moreno. Documents from Rui de Pina also indicated that the fortifications of Seda were not identified as a castle in the works of King D. Denis.
