= Sousel (parish) =

- Civil parish
- Location in Portugal
- Coordinates: 38.952°N 7.676°W
- Country: Portugal
- Region: Alentejo
- Intermunic. comm.: Alto Alentejo
- District: Portalegre
- Municipality: Sousel

Area
  - Total: 89.28 km^{2} (34.47 sq mi)

Population (2011)
  - Total: 1,932
  - Density: 22/km^{2} (56/sq mi)
- Time zone: UTC+00:00 (WET)
  - Summer (DST): UTC+01:00 (WEST)
- Postal code: 7470

Sousel is a civil parish located in Sousel Municipality, Portugal. The population in 2011 was 1,932, in an area of 89.28 km^{2}.
