= Castle of Alter Pedroso =

Portuguese medieval castle

- Castelo de Alter Pedroso
- Portalegre, Alto Alentejo, Alentejo in Portugal
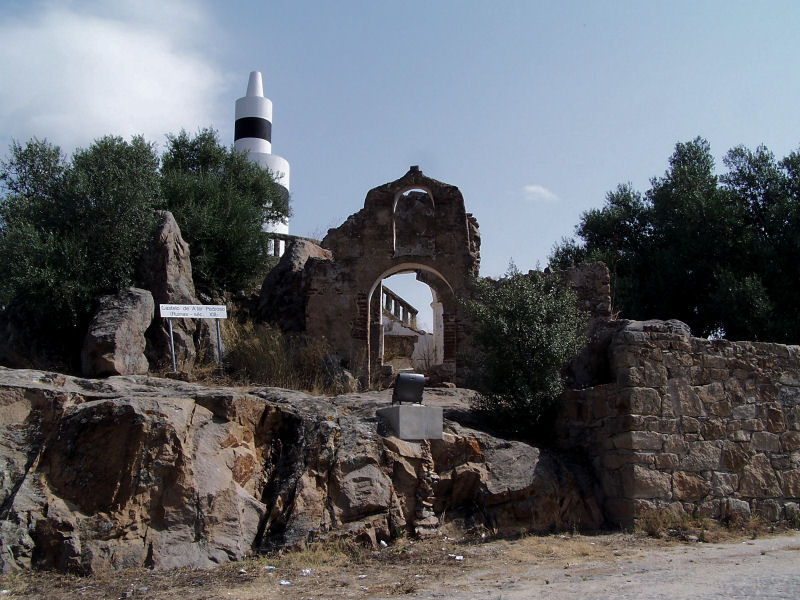
- Ruins and vestiges of the long-forgotten castle of Alter Pedroso

Site information
- Type: Castle
- Owner: Portuguese Republic
- Open to the public: Public

Location
- Coordinates: 39°11′21″N 7°37′22″W

Site history
- Materials: Masonry, Taipa

The Castle of Alter do Chão (Portuguese: Castelo de Alter do Chão) is a Portuguese medieval castle in civil parish of Alter do Chão, in the municipality of Alter do Chão, in the district of Portalegre.

== History ==
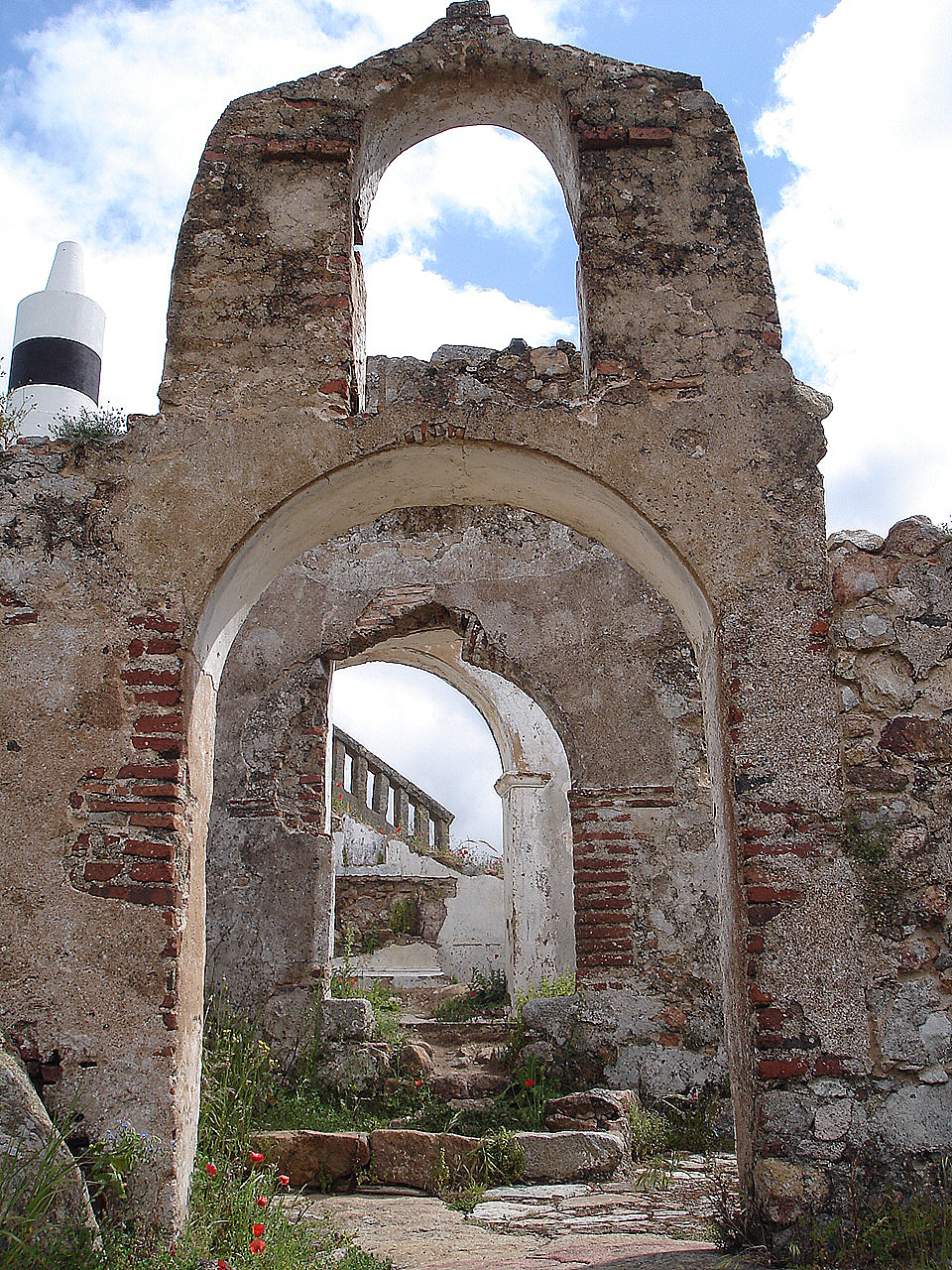
The archways of the hermitage of São Bento ruins at the summit

Between the 12th and 13th centuries the castle was a fortified settlement. Part of the vast territory of Muslim settlement, following the 13th century it was conquered by Christian forces.

From bibliographic references, in 1211, the fortifications were part of the domains of the military Order of São Bento of Aviz.

By 1216, from the writings of João de Almeida (1945/1948), King D. Afonso II issued a foral (charter) to D. Fernando Anes, but on 30 June 1249, his successor (Afonso III) re-issued the donation to the Order of Aviz.

Between 1279 and 1325, Rui de Pina noted that King D. D. Dinis did not intervene or refer to the settlement/fortification at Alter Pedroso. During this time a small hermitage was constructed to the dedication of São Bento (St. Benedict).

Between 1350 and 1450, there was no fortification/castle.

During the events of the Portuguese Restoration War, in 1662, John of Austria raised the site.

In 1886, the cemetery located in the vicinity was constructed.

In 1940, with the construction of the municipal motorway, the southwest line of walls was destroyed and the material used in the construction. A geodesic marker was also constructed in the area, along with a lookout, followed by a reservoir by the municipal authority.

On 1 June 1992, the property came under the responsibility of the Instituto Português do Património Arquitetónico (Portuguese Institute of Architectural Patrimony), by decree 106F/92 (Diário da República, Série 1A, 126).

== Architecture ==
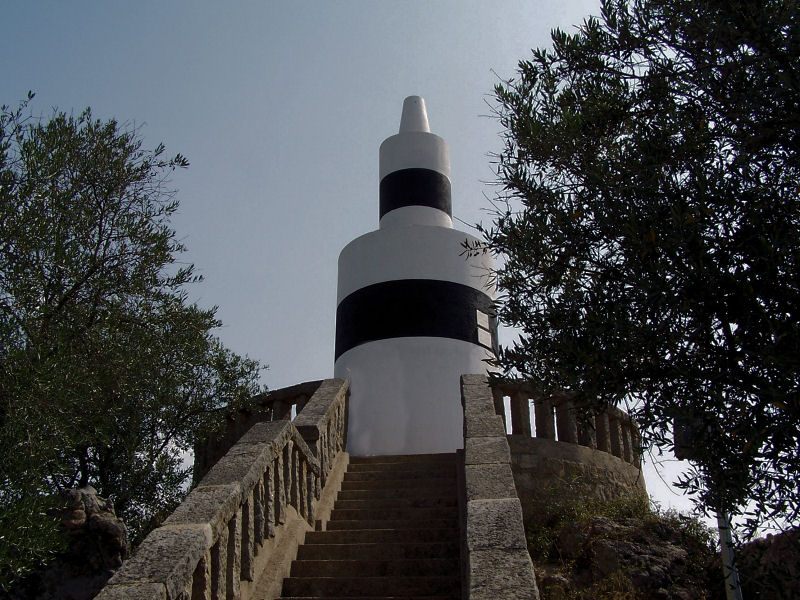
The geodesic marker that repurposed one of the corbels

The castle is situated on an isolated, rural hilltop 413 metres (1,355 ft) above sea level, bounded by rocky cliffs and linked by hedgerows that connect to Rua do Castelo in the village of Alter Pedroso.

The remains of the walls and corbels are distributed in an elliptical area, whose major segment, 86 metres (282 ft), is oriented to the north, while a minor segment of 50 metres (160 ft) to the south. What remains of the fortifications are: the base of a 13.5 metres (44 ft) wall in the west; a 3.3 metres (11 ft) line in the north, connected to rocks; a small wall to the east, also linked to the rocks; two 1.6 metres (5.2 ft) wide lines of walls, between 6.2–10.5 metres (20–34 ft), interconnected and forming an obtuse angle, terminating at a 2.9 metres (9.5 ft) corbel, in the south/southeast; and foundations of a wall 16 metres (52 ft) long to the south, from the cemetery to a corbel.

The castle gate, composed of an ogive arch in the south is framed by 1.9–2.4 metres (6.2–7.9 ft) granite, and segment of perpendicular wall to the northwest. Within the old courtyard of the castle is a geodesic marker 412.83 metres (1,354.4 ft) above sea level, although the mountain reaches 420.9 metres (1,381 ft). Immediately below and to the west are the ruins of the Hermitage of São Bento. In the east, and south of the lookout, is a small 1.9 metres (6.2 ft) deep cistern. In the southeast, south and southwest, are observation post for firefighters, municipal water reservoir and cemetery.

The small Hermitage of São Bento, with simple, longitudinal plan includes unique 4 by 4.9 metres (13 ft × 16 ft) nave, triumphal rounded-arch and small chancel, 2.15 by 4.10 metres (7.1 ft × 13.5 ft) and remnants of a niche, .47 metres (1.5 ft). There are 13 compartiments, with 50 centimetres (1.6 ft) thick walls. The portico includes chamfered arch in tile masonry. What remains of the west to east is a small compartment to serve the atrium, 4.75 by 3.40 metres (15.6 ft × 11.2 ft) with structure for a bell, which accessible to the doorway and cemetery.
