= Casa Branca, Sousel =

Casa Branca
- Civil parish
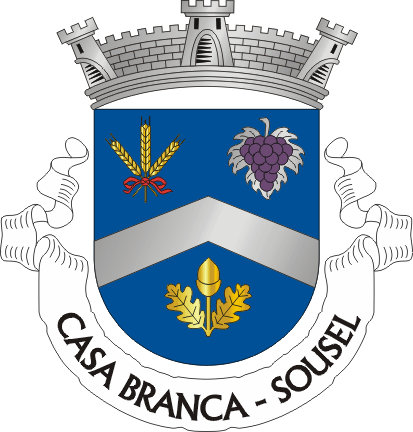
- Coat of arms

- Location in Portugal
- Coordinates: 38.949935°N 7.809054°W
- Country: Portugal
- Region: Alentejo
- Intermunic. comm.: Alto Alentejo
- District: Portalegre
- Municipality: Sousel

Population (2011)
  - Total: 1,232
- Time zone: UTC+00:00 (WET)
  - Summer (DST): UTC+01:00 (WEST)
- Postal code: 7470

Casa Branca (English: White House) is a civil parish in the municipality of Sousel.

== Location and statistics ==
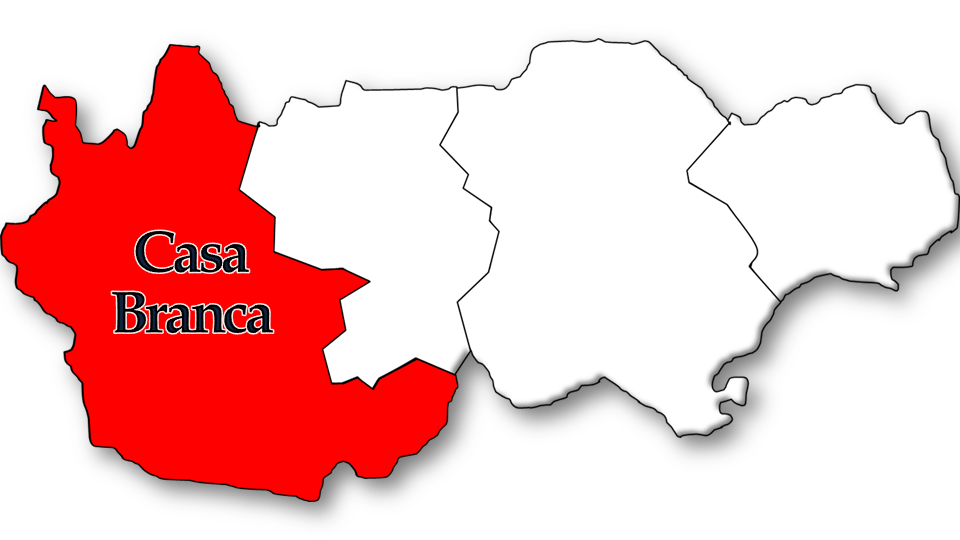
Location in Sousel Municipality

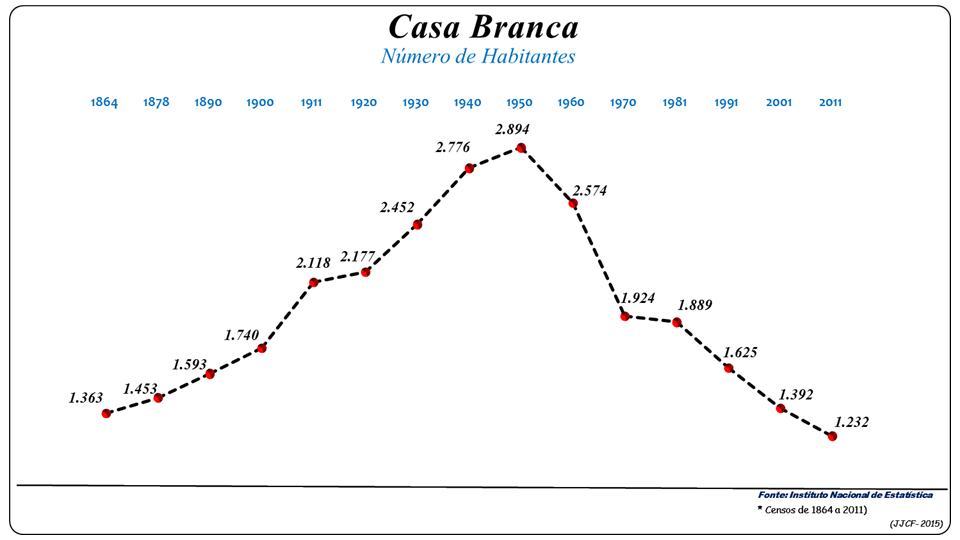
Population by year

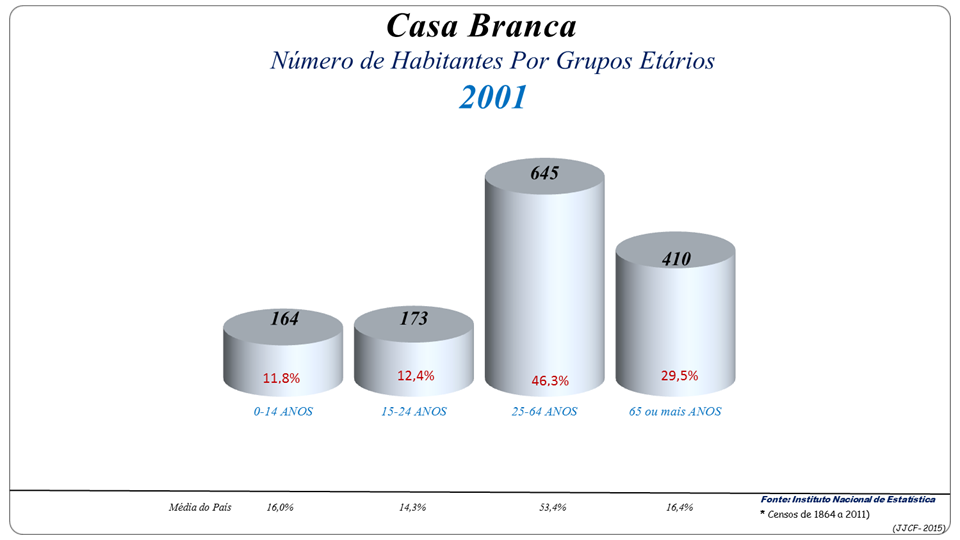
Population by age group in 2001

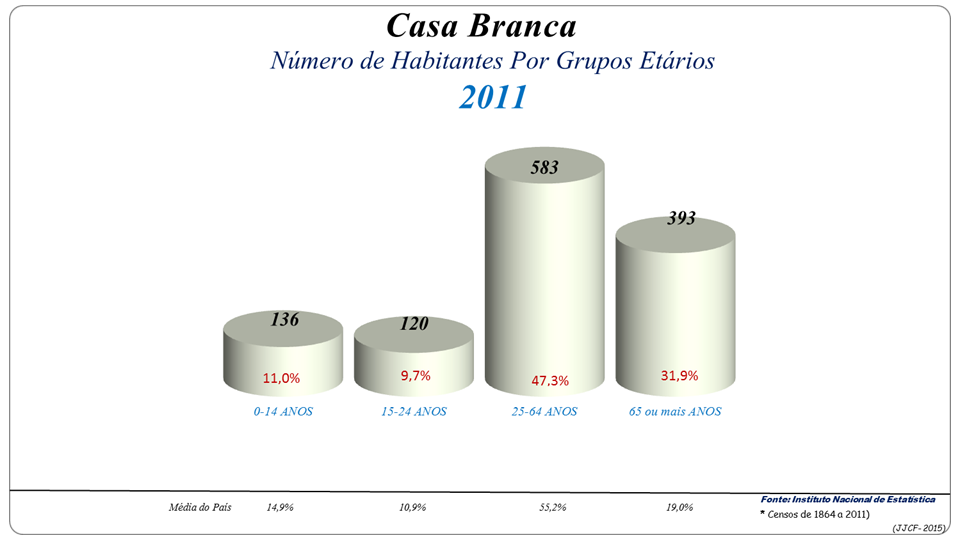
Population by age group in 2011
