= Roman Bridge of Vila Formosa =

Bridge in Portugal

Roman Bridge of Vila Formosa Ponte de Vila Formosa
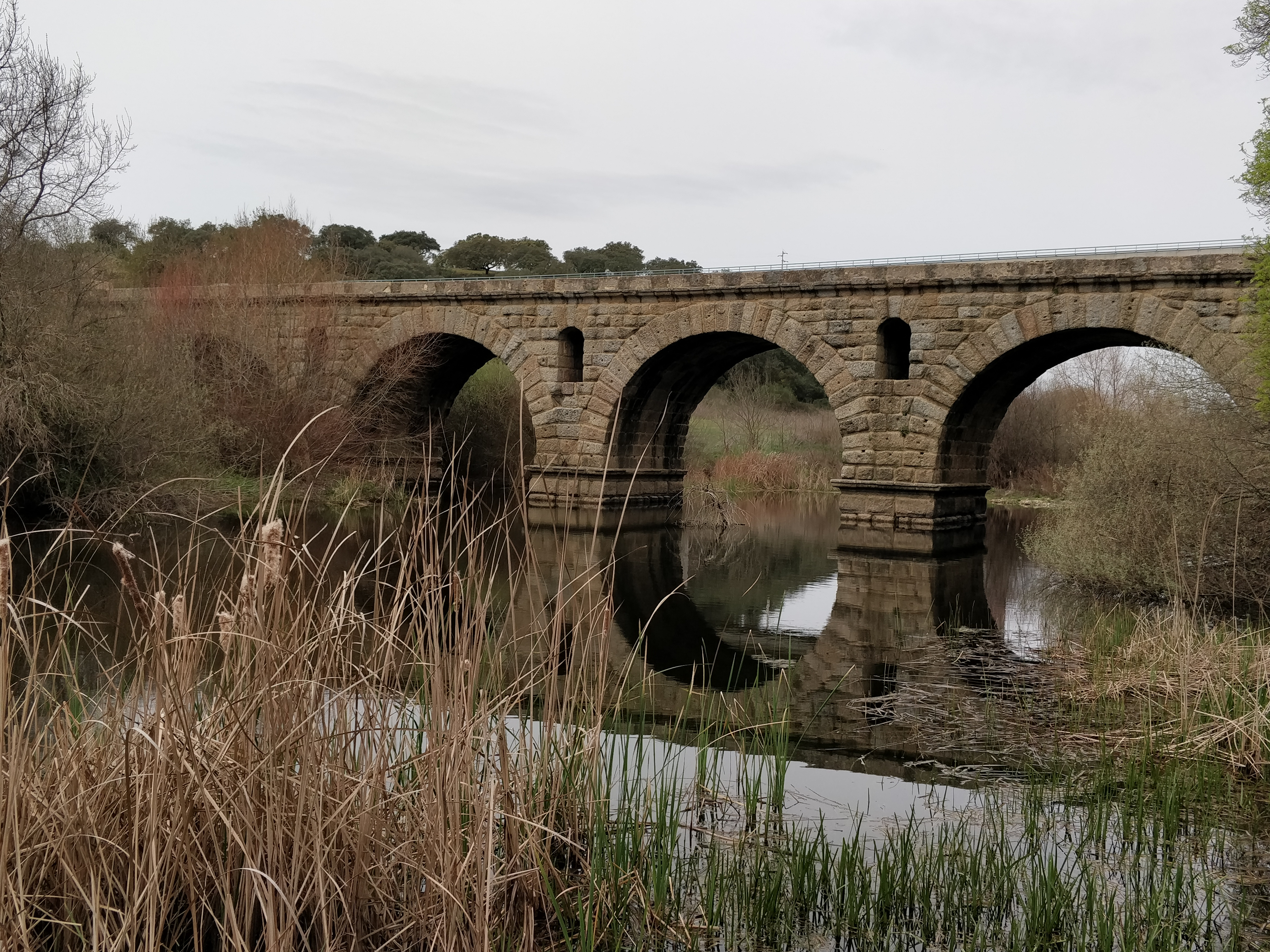
- Coordinates: 39.216°N 7.785°W
- Crosses: Seda river or stream
- Locale: Alter do Chão, Portalegre District, Portugal
- Heritage status: Portuguese National Monument

Characteristics
- Material: Stone
- Total length: 116.50 metres (382.2 ft)
- Width: 6.70 metres (22.0 ft)
- Height: 8.40 metres (27.6 ft)
- No. of spans: 6

History
- Construction start: 1st century CE

The Roman Bridge of Vila Formosa (Ponte de Vila Formosa) crosses the Seda stream, close to the village of Seda, in the municipality of Alter do Chão, in the Portalegre District of Portugal. It dates back to the first century CE.

== Description ==
The bridge was part of a Roman road that connected Lisbon to Mérida in Spain. It is approximately 116.50 metres long, 8.40 metres high and 6.70 metres wide. Stone pillars support six 8.95 metre-wide arches, each with 33 voussoirs. The bridge was constructed with portico-shaped eyeholes between the arches to prevent the structure from collapsing during floods, a common practice for Roman bridges. It was decorated with gargoyles.

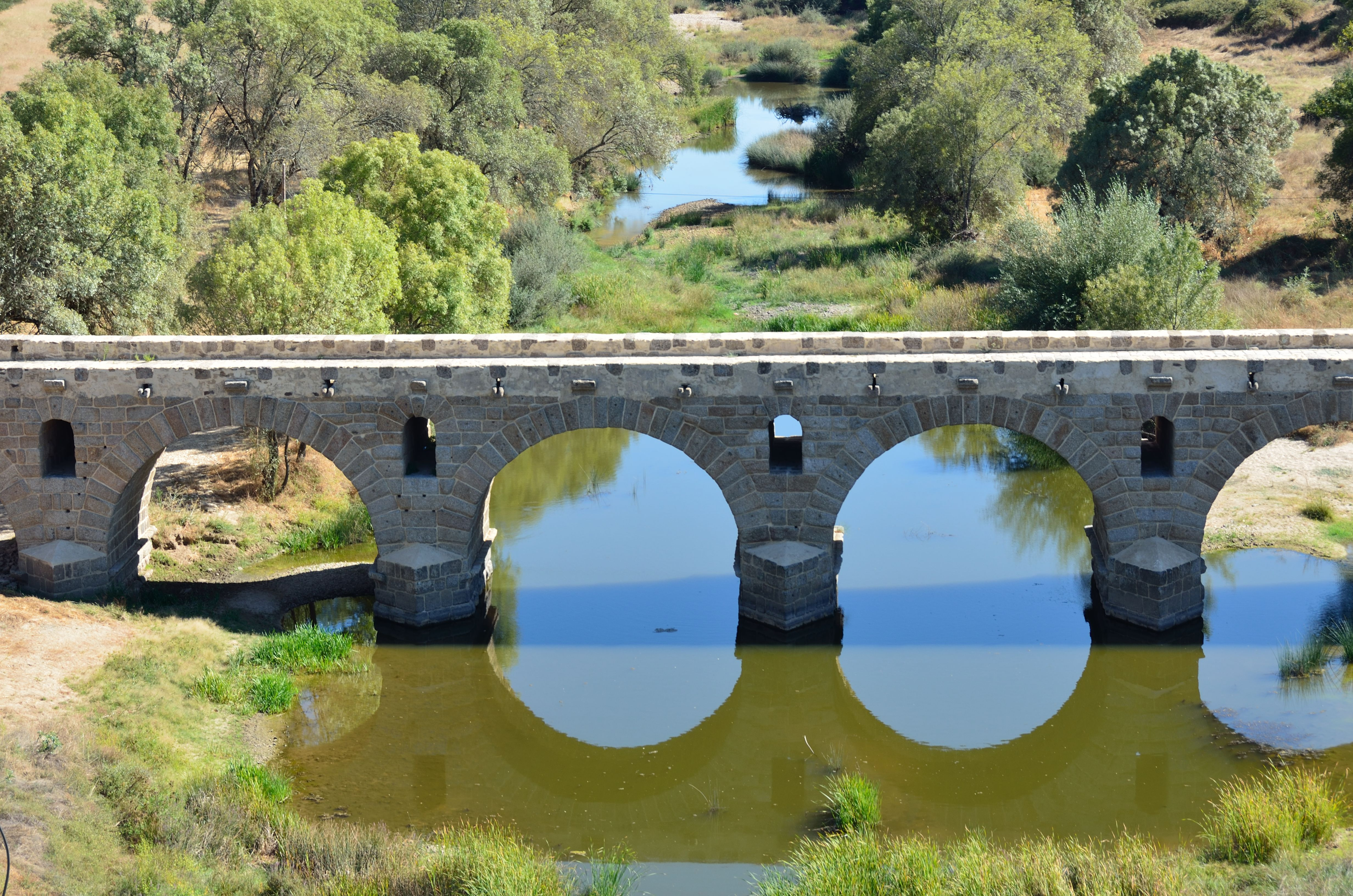
View from the north

The bridge, which is believed to have been constructed at the end of the 1st century CE, was classified as a National Monument on 16 June 1910. Cleaning and restoration work was carried out between 1932 and 1934 and in 1936 a new road surface was added, in imitation of old Roman roads. Further repairs were carried out in 1939, 1963, 1980 and 2000. Until recently, the bridge was in use for commercial traffic, but it has now been replaced by a new road and bridge to its north.

== See also ==
- List of Roman bridges
- List of bridges in Portugal
