= Rogério Silva =

Rogério Silva may refer to:

- Rogério Silva (footballer)
- Rogério Silva (politician)
- Rogerio Silva (swimmer)
- Rogério Dutra Silva, Brazilian tennis player
