= Tiago Serralheiro =

Portuguese footballer

Personal information
- Full name: Tiago dos Reis Xavier Serralheiro
- Date of birth: 20 March 1997 (age 29)
- Place of birth: Sousel, Portugal
- Height: 1.84 m (6 ft 0 in)
- Position: Forward

Team information
- Current team: Gondomar

Youth career
- 2006–2007: ACD Santo Amaro
- 2007–2012: Vidense
- 2012–2013: Eléctrico
- 2013–2015: Académica
- 2015–2016: Paços Ferreira

Senior career*
Years	Team	Apps	(Gls)
2015–2016	Paços Ferreira	0	(0)
2016–	Gondomar	4	(0)
- * Club domestic league appearances and goals as of 29 January 2017

Tiago dos Reis Xavier Serralheiro (born 20 March 1997) is a Portuguese professional footballer who plays for Gondomar as a forward.

== Career ==
On 29 December 2015, Serralheiro made his professional debut with Paços Ferreira in a 2014–15 Taça da Liga match against Sporting.
