= Laura Santana Maia =

Portuguese Supreme Court judge (born 1937)

Maria Laura Santana Maia

Member of the Supreme Court of Justice of Portugal
- In office 2004–2007

Personal details
- Born: Maria Laura de Carvalho Santana Maia; 8 October 1937 (age 88) Ponte de Sor, Portugal
- Children: 2
- Education: University of Coimbra
- Occupation: Lawyer; Judge

Maria Laura Santana Maia (born 1937) is a Portuguese lawyer who became the first female member of the Supreme Court of Justice of Portugal in May 2004.

== Early life and education ==
Maia was born on 8 October 1937 in Ponte de Sor in the Portalegre District of Portugal's Alentejo region. Her full name was Maria Laura de Carvalho Santana Maia. Her father, António Maria Santana Maia, who originally came from the nearby parish of Mouriscas in the Santarém District, was a lawyer and notary as well as a farmer. A keen painter, Maia did not begin to study law until she was 30, after her husband died. They had two children.

== Career ==
At that time, under the Estado Novo dictatorship, women were not allowed to become judges or magistrates. After obtaining her qualifications she worked in the Public Prosecutor's Office in various locations, including Loulé and Guimarães. After the overthrow of the Estado Novo by the Carnation Revolution of April 1974 it became possible for women to become judges and she served in this capacity in Serpa, Mértola and Cartaxo. She joined the 17th Civil Court of Lisbon, the Portuguese capital, in 1988 and also lectured at the Judicial Studies Centre, which provides training for future judges and prosecutors. In 1995, she was appointed judge of the Court of Appeal of Évora.

In May 2004 she was elected unanimously by other members of the Supreme Court to become a member. She retired three years later, at the age of 60.
