= Gavião e Atalaia =

- Civil parish
- Location in Portugal
- Coordinates: 39.465°N 7.937°W
- Country: Portugal
- Region: Alentejo
- Intermunic. comm.: Alto Alentejo
- District: Portalegre
- Municipality: Gavião

Area
  - Total: 77.88 km^{2} (30.07 sq mi)

Population (2011)
  - Total: 1,747
  - Density: 22.43/km^{2} (58.10/sq mi)
- Time zone: UTC+00:00 (WET)
  - Summer (DST): UTC+01:00 (WEST)

Gavião e Atalaia is a civil parish in the municipality of Gavião, Portugal. It was formed in 2013 by the merger of the former parishes Gavião and Atalaia. The population in 2011 was 1,747, in an area of 77.88 km^{2}.
