= Eusébio Leão =

Portuguese politician

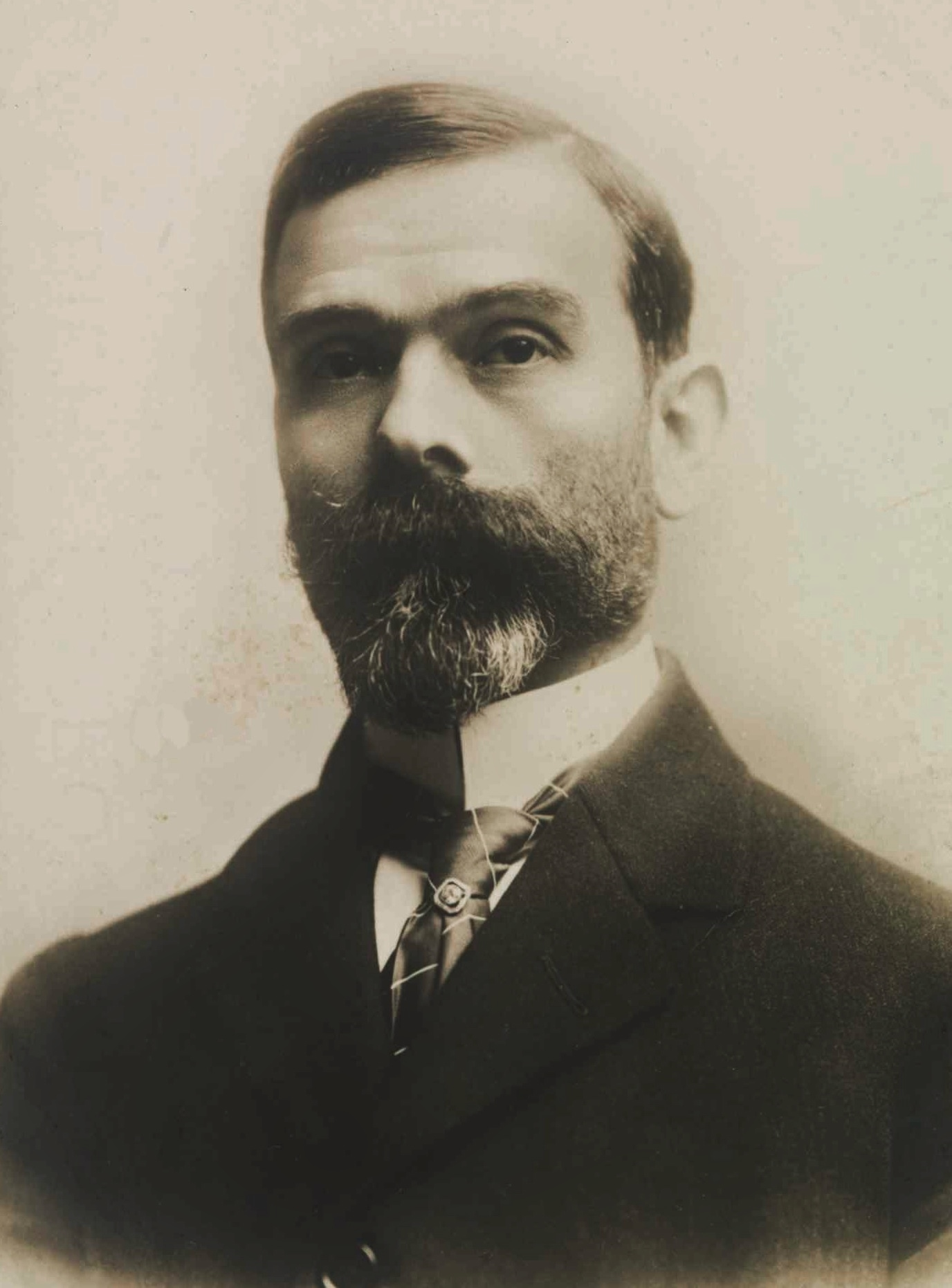

Civil Governor of the Lisbon District
- In office 5 October 1910 – 23 February 1912
- Prime Minister: Teófilo Braga (1910–11); João Pinheiro Chagas (1911); Augusto Vasconcelos (1911–12)
- Preceded by: Alfredo Mendes de Magalhães Ramalho
- Succeeded by: Manuel Nunes de Oliveira

Member of the Constituent Assembly for Portalegre
- In office 15 June 1911 – 25 August 1911

Senator for Portalegre
- In office 26 August 1911 – 4 April 1912

Personal details
- Born: 2 February 1864 Gavião, Kingdom of Portugal
- Died: 21 November 1926 (aged 62) Lisbon, Portugal
- Party: Portuguese Republican Party (later Unionist Party)
- Spouse: Laura Virgínia de Barros de Azevedo
- Occupation: Urologist, politician and diplomat

Francisco Eusébio Lourenço Leão (2 February 1864 – 21 November 1926) was a Portuguese physician and republican politician.

== Biography ==
He was born in Gavião, Portalegre. He was trained as a physician in the Lisbon Medico-Surgical School, from which he graduated in 1890. He practised medicine in his hometown of Gavião, and then specialised in urology in Paris and Berlin.

He was politically active in Lisbon, especially after the 1890 British Ultimatum, contributing to several publications as a vocal proponent of the republican ideals. He joined the Freemasonry in 1893, part of the Elias Garcia Loge from 1895 and the José Estêvão Loge from 1911.

Eusébio Leão was one of the founders of the newspaper A Pátria and, in October 1909, was elected Secretary to the Directory of the Portuguese Republican Party. He ran several times for Parliament around this time, but was never elected.

After the Republican Revolution in 1910, during which he was one of the people who proclaimed the new regime from the balcony of the Lisbon City Hall, he was made Civil Governor of the Lisbon District, and was elected member of the National Constituent Assembly to draft a new constitution. Afterwards, he became a Senator.

When the Portuguese Republican Party dissolved in 1912, Eusébio Leão became part of Brito Camacho's Unionist Party. That year, he was named ambassador in Rome, a post he occupied until October 1926.

Eusébio Leão died in Lisbon, on 21 November 1926.
