= Castle of Alter do Chão =

Medieval castle

Coordinates: 39°11′56″N 7°39′31″W

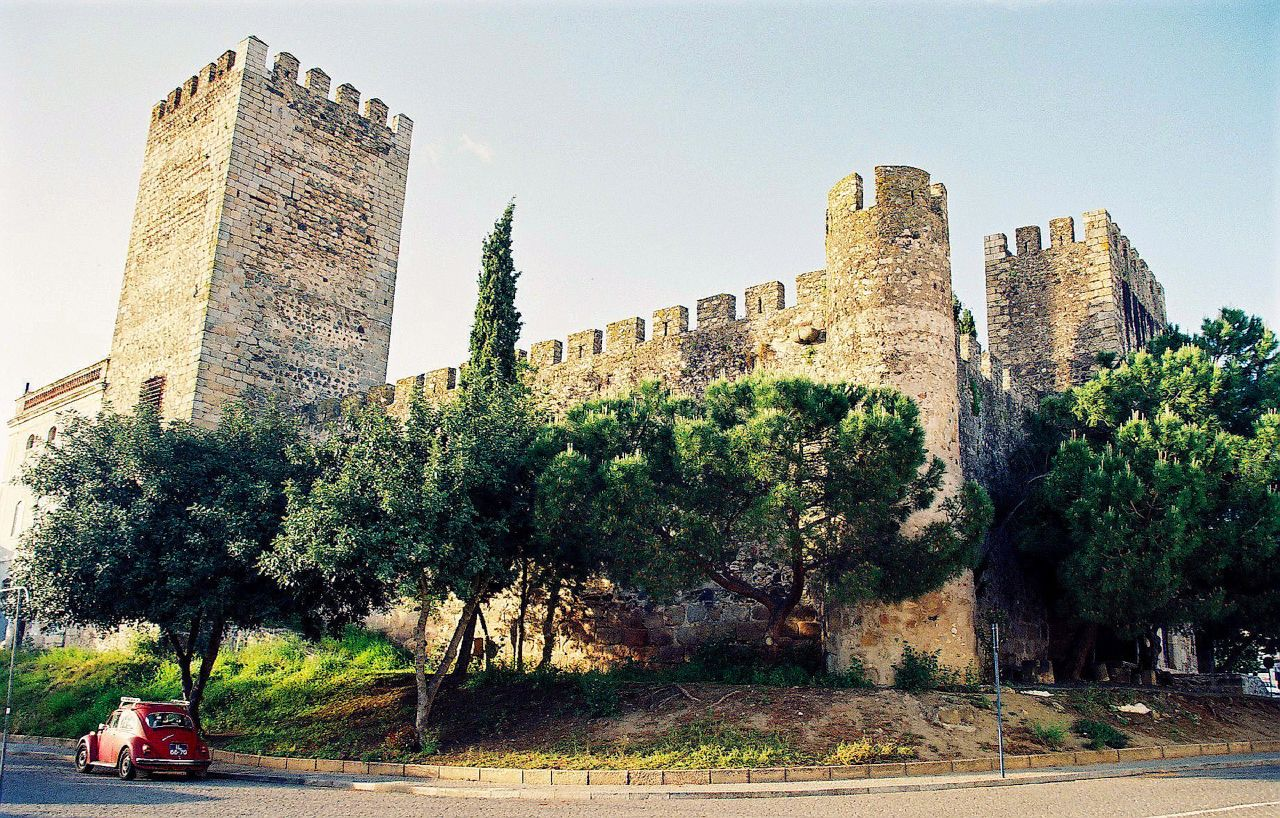

The Castle of Alter do Chão (Portuguese: Castelo de Alter do Chão) is a medieval castle in civil parish of Alter do Chão, municipality of Alter do Chão, in the district of Portalegre.

It is classified as a National Monument.
