= António Fernandes (music theorist) =

António Fernandes (born c. 1595 – died after 1680) was Portuguese music theorist, church choir director, and Roman Catholic priest. He is best known for authoring the first music theory treatise published in the Portuguese language.

== Biography ==
António Fernandes was born in Sousel in c. 1595. He studied music with composer Duarte Lobo. He afterwords became a priest and maestro de capilla at Church of Saint Catherine, Lisbon. Also a singer as well as a conductor, it is speculated that he was the António Fernandes who was a member of the chapel choir in Vila Viçosa in service to John VI of Portugal in 1642.

Fernandes's music theory treatise, Arte de musica de canto dorgam, e canto cham & proporções (1626, Lisbon), was dedicated to his teacher, Duarte Lobo. A work largely based on earlier work by Gioseffo Zarlino and Pietro Cerone, it was the first music theory treatise published in the Portuguese language and consisted of 131 quarto leaves.

The exact year and location of Fernandes's death is unknown. He died sometime after 1680.
