= Rogério Silva (politician) =

Portuguese politician and lawyer

Mayor of Fronteira
- Incumbent
- Assumed office 29 September 2013
- Preceded by: Pedro Lancha

Deputy Mayor of Fronteira
- In office 11 October 2009 – 29 September 2013
- President: Pedro Lancha

Member of the Fronteira Municipal Assembly
- In office 9 October 2005 – 11 October 2009

Personal details
- Born: Rogério David Sádio da Silva; 5 December 1980 (age 45) Portalegre, Portugal
- Party: Social Democratic Party
- Education: University of Lisbon
- Occupation: Lawyer • politician

Rogério David Sádio da Silva (born 5 December 1980) is a Portuguese lawyer and politician from the Social Democratic Party. He is the Mayor of Fronteira since 2013. Between 2009 and 2013 he was Deputy Mayor of Fronteira.

Silva is a lawyer, he graduated in Law from the Faculty of Law of the University of Lisbon. He was also a member of the Fronteira Municipal Assembly between 2005 and 2009.

In January 2024, he was announced as candidate number one, on Democratic Alliance's Portalegre list for the 2024 legislative elections.
