= Fronteira, Portugal =

Fronteira
- Municipality
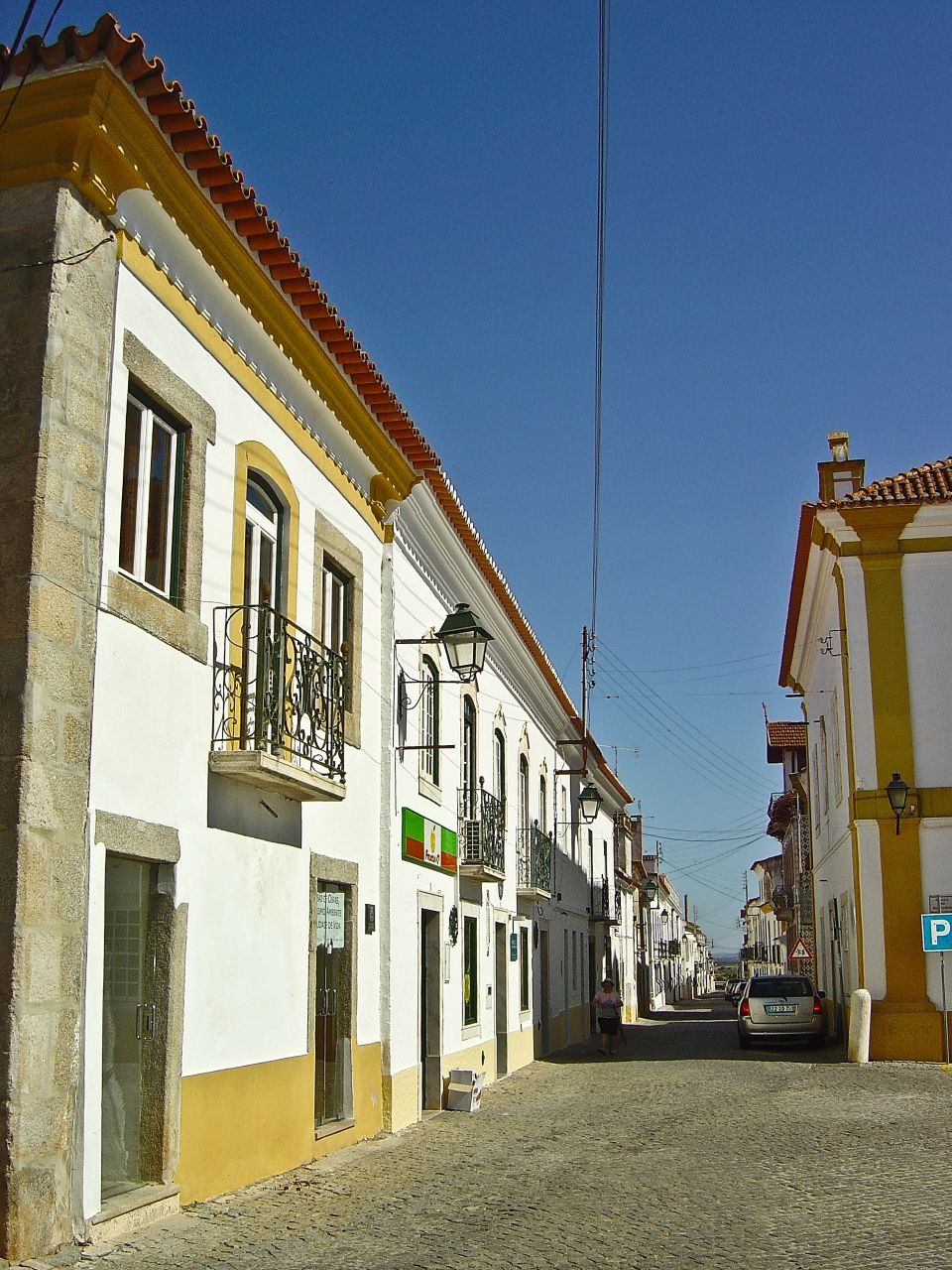

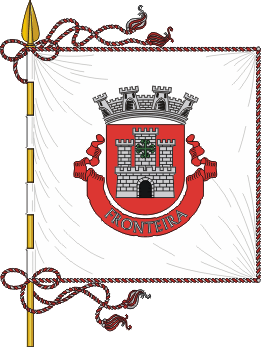
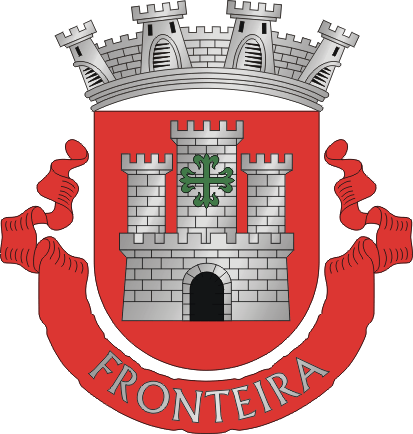
- Flag Coat of arms
- Interactive map of Fronteira
- Location in Portugal
- Coordinates: 39°03′N 7°38′W
- Country: Portugal
- Region: Alentejo
- Intermunic. comm.: Alto Alentejo
- District: Portalegre
- Parishes: 3

Government
  - President: Rogério Silva (PSD)

Area
  - Total: 248.60 km^{2} (95.98 sq mi)

Population (2011)
  - Total: 3,410
  - Density: 13.7/km^{2} (35.5/sq mi)
- Time zone: UTC+00:00 (WET)
  - Summer (DST): UTC+01:00 (WEST)
- Local holiday: April 6
- Website: www.cm-fronteira.pt

Fronteira (pronounced [fɾõˈtɐjɾɐ]) is a municipality in Portalegre District in Portugal. The population in 2011 was 3,410, in an area of 248.60 km^{2}.

The present Mayor is Rogério David Sádio da Silva, elected by the Social Democratic Party. The municipal holiday is April 6.

== Parishes ==
Administratively, the municipality is divided into 3 civil parishes (freguesias):

- Cabeço de Vide
- Fronteira
- São Saturnino

== Notable people ==
- Manuel Cardoso (1566–1650) a Portuguese composer and organist.
- Bartolomeo Riberi (1640–1702) a Roman Catholic prelate, Bishop of Nicotera, 1691–1702
