= Monforte, Portugal =

Monforte
- Municipality
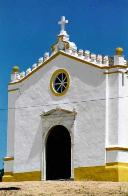

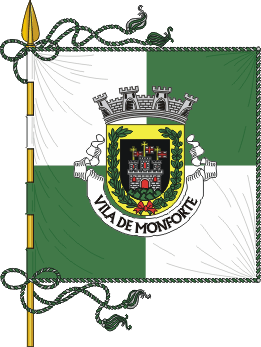
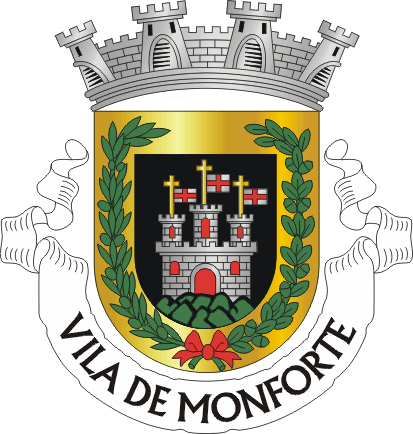
- Flag Coat of arms
- Interactive map of Monforte
- Coordinates: 39°03′N 7°26′W
- Country: Portugal
- Region: Alentejo
- Intermunic. comm.: Alto Alentejo
- District: Portalegre
- Parishes: 4

Government
  - President: Gonçalo Nuno Lagem (CDU)

Area
  - Total: 420.25 km^{2} (162.26 sq mi)

Population (2011)
  - Total: 3,329
  - Density: 7.921/km^{2} (20.52/sq mi)
- Time zone: UTC+00:00 (WET)
  - Summer (DST): UTC+01:00 (WEST)
- Website: https://www.cm-monforte.pt

Monforte (Portuguese pronunciation: [mõˈfɔɾtɨ]) is a municipality in the District of Portalegre in Portugal. The population in 2011 was 3,329, in an area of 420.25 km^{2}.

The present Mayor is Gonçalo Nuno Lagem, elected by the Coligação Democrática Unitária.

== History ==
The human occupation of this territory began in the Neolithic period, with small communities farming and cattle raising. The Roman civilization had an important influence in these lands leaving a rich patrimonial legacy.

During the Middle Ages there existed in the territory of the present council two different population nucleus, the Villa of Monforte and the Villa of Assumar.

The first Letter of charter was granted in 1257, by D.Afonso III, to the Villa of Monforte. It would be it given new letter of charter on July 1, 1512, by D. Manuel I. In 1281, D. Dinis offered it to its daughter D. Isabel, as gift of its marriage. In 1455, the Villa of Monforte entered in the ownership of the territorial domain of Bragança's House, through the donation done by D. Afonso V to the count of Arraiolos. The toponym derives of fortified hill or of fort, where the village seems to have had origin.

== Parishes ==
Administratively, the municipality is divided into 4 civil parishes (freguesias):

- Assumar
- Monforte
- Santo Aleixo
- Vaiamonte

== Notable people ==
- António Sardinha (1887–1925) a Portuguese writer and the main intellectual behind the Integralismo Lusitano movement
- José Carlos Malato (born 1964) a Portuguese TV presenter, radio broadcaster, copywriter and college teacher.
