= Alter do Chão =

- Municipality
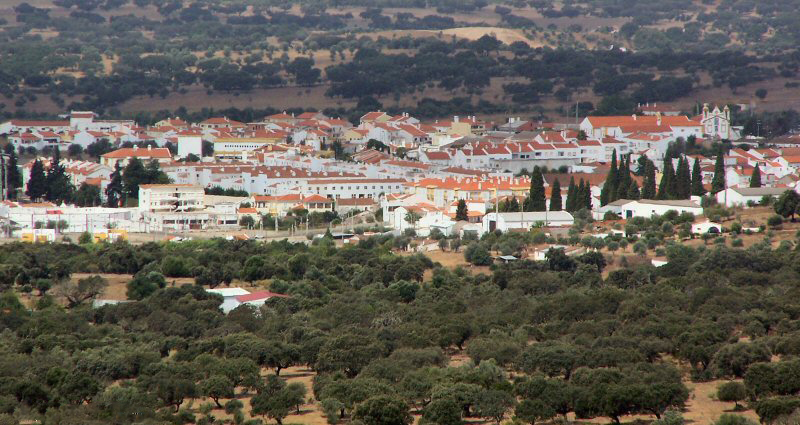

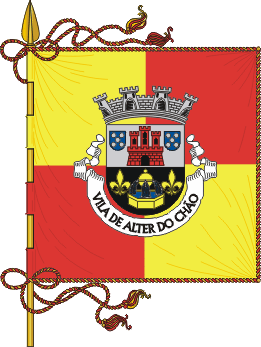
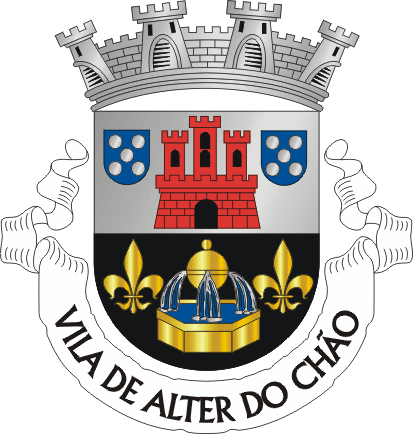
- Flag Coat of arms
- Interactive map of Alter do Chão
- Location in Portugal
- Coordinates: 39°11′N 7°39′W
- Country: Portugal
- Region: Alentejo
- Intermunic. comm.: Alto Alentejo
- District: Portalegre
- Parishes: 4

Government
  - President: Francisco Miranda (PSD/CDS–PP)

Area
  - Total: 362.07 km^{2} (139.80 sq mi)

Population (2011)
  - Total: 3,562
  - Density: 9.838/km^{2} (25.48/sq mi)
- Time zone: UTC+00:00 (WET)
  - Summer (DST): UTC+01:00 (WEST)
- Local holiday: Ascension Day date varies
- Website: www.cm-alter-chao.pt

Alter do Chão (European Portuguese pronunciation: [alˈtɛɾ ðu ˈʃɐ̃w]) is a town and a municipality in the District of Portalegre in Portugal. The population in 2011 was 3,562, in an area of 362.07 square kilometres (139.80 mi^{2}).

The present Mayor is Francisco Miranda, elected by a centre-right coalition of the Social Democratic Party and the People's Party. The municipal holiday is Ascension Day. The municipality is famous for its horsebreeding and high school of horseriding.

== History ==
Human presence in Alter do Chão area dates back to the Neolithic, with around 30 dolmens identified across the municipality. Archaeological excavations near the Castle of Alter do Chão and the Casa do Álamo garden uncovered stone and ceramic artifacts associated with a prehistoric settlement, indicating habitation as early as the late 4th millennium BCE.

The town received its first foral (royal charter) in 1232, granted by Vicente Hispano, Bishop of Guarda. Another foral was issued in 1249, by King Afonso III.

The name Alter has Indo-European roots and was first recorded in Roman times as Abelterium, later evolving into forms such as Abelteriu and Aelteriu during Late Antiquity. During Iberia's islamic period the name was further adapted the name to Alteiru, which eventually became Alter. The designation "do Chão" appeared to distinguish it from Alter Pedroso, a nearby settlement located on rocky high ground, while Alter was established on a flat plain.

== Parishes ==
Administratively, the municipality is divided into 4 civil parishes (freguesias):

- Alter do Chão
- Chancelaria
- Cunheira
- Seda
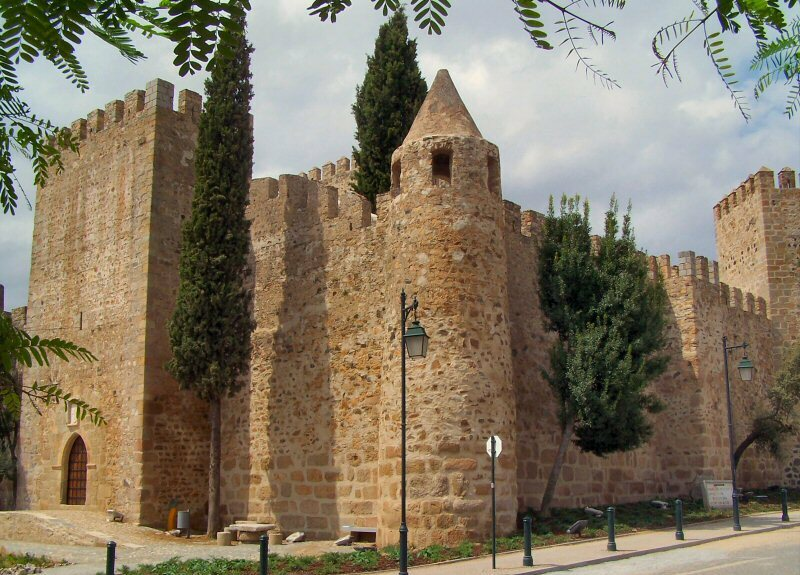
Local castle.

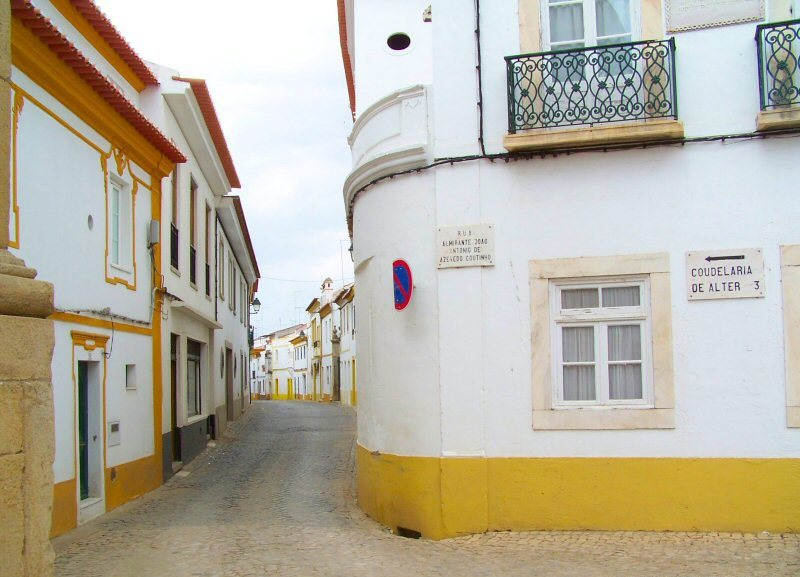
A typical city street.

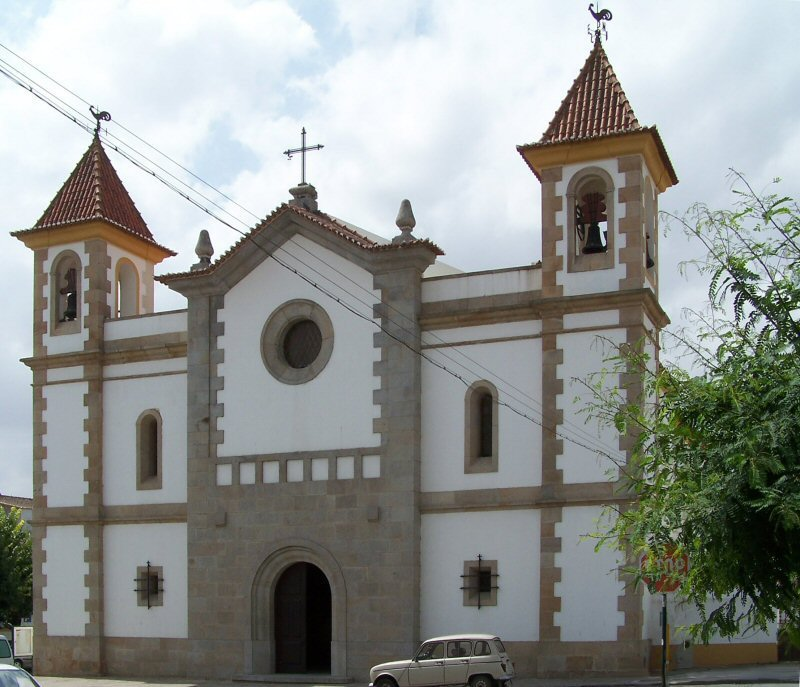
The local church.

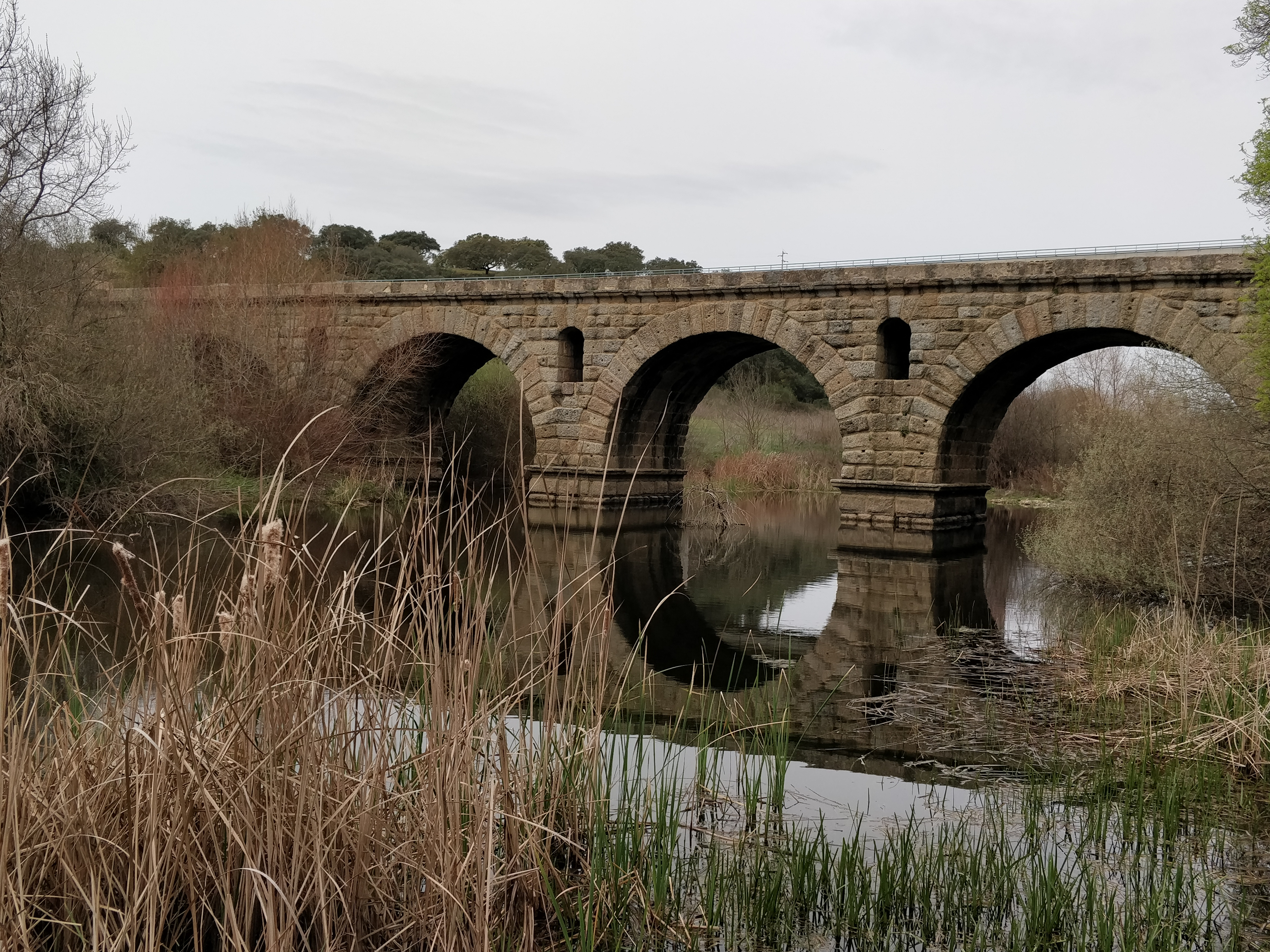
Roman Bridge of Vila Formosa.

== Landmarks ==
Alter do Chão's historical and architectural heritage includes castles, bridges, and religious monuments scattered across the municipality.

The Castle of Alter do Chão, located inside the town, is a 13th century fortress, which got converted into a noble residence under the House of Braganza in the 15th century. It is classified as a National Monument and features Gothic architectural elements including arched doorways, ribbed vaults, and battlements.

Outside the town, there are two castle ruins. The Castle of Alter Pedroso, an Islamic-origin fortification conquered in 1160 by King Afonso I with the help of the Knights Templar. In the parish of Seda, stand the remains of the Castle of Seda, the former medieval town walls reinforced by circular towers.

Among the municipality’s bridges, the most remarkable is the Roman Bridge of Vila Formosa, a National Monument built between the 1st century BCE and the 1st century CE. It formed part of a Roman road linking Olisipo (Lisbon) to Augusta Emerita (Mérida) and is noted for its six arches, five flood openings, and well-preserved opus quadratum construction. A second bridge is classified as a Monument of Public Interest, the Ponte dos Mendes, a smaller schist bridge with two arches.

Religious heritage is present across the municipality, with several churches and chapels in its parishes. In the town of Alter do Chão, the Church of Senhor Jesus do Outeiro is a prominent Baroque temple, featuring a richly decorated façade, a four-opening bell tower, and an interior with a vaulted chancel and intricate wrought-iron balconies. Northwest of the town lies the Chapel of Santo António dos Olivais, which combines Renaissance, proto-Baroque, and vernacular styles, with a chancel decorated with painted ribbed vaults and blue-and-yellow tiles.

== Notable people ==
- Artur Pastor (1922 – 1999) a photographer.
- Rodrigo Torres (born 1977) a dressage rider.

== International relations ==
Alter do Chão is twinned with Negrești-Oaș, Romania since 2016.
