= Gavião, Portugal =

Gavião
- Municipality
- Town of Gavião
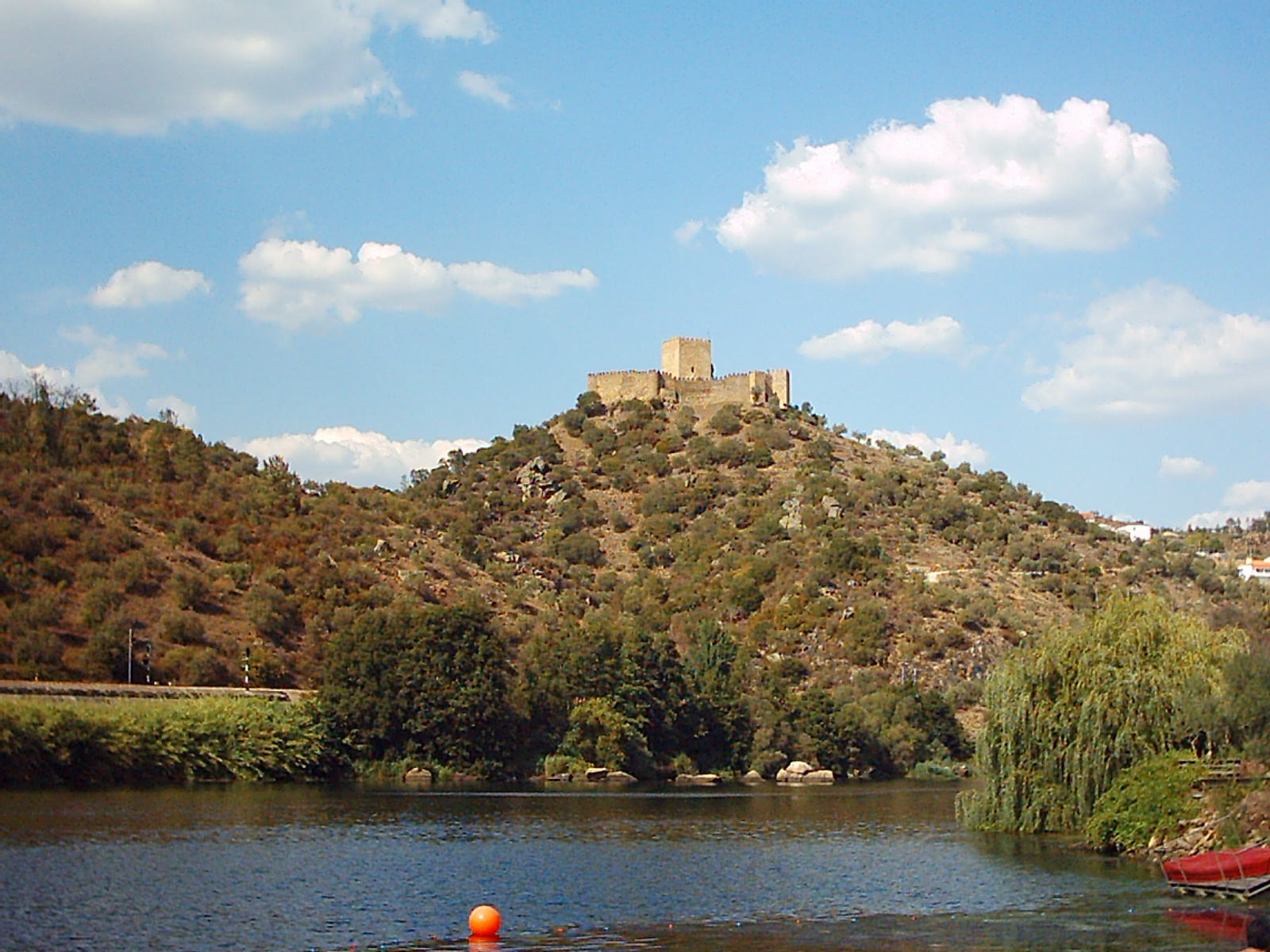

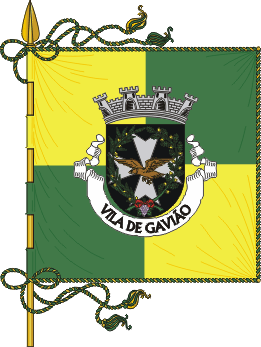
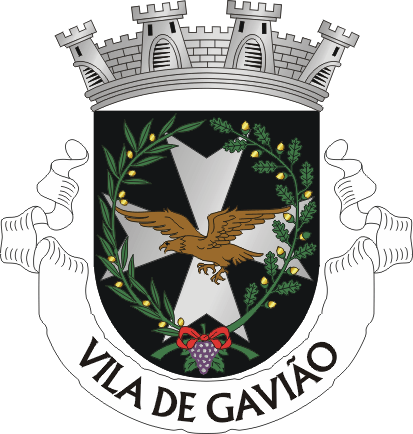
- Flag Coat of arms
- Interactive map of Gavião
- Location in Portugal
- Coordinates: 39°27′N 7°56′W
- Country: Portugal
- Region: Alentejo
- Intermunic. comm.: Alto Alentejo
- District: Portalegre
- Parishes: 4

Government
  - President: José Pio (PS)

Area
  - Total: 294.59 km^{2} (113.74 sq mi)

Population (2011)
  - Total: 4,132
  - Density: 14.03/km^{2} (36.33/sq mi)
- Time zone: UTC+00:00 (WET)
  - Summer (DST): UTC+01:00 (WEST)
- Local holiday: November 23
- Website: www.cm-gaviao.pt

Gavião (European Portuguese pronunciation: [ɡɐviˈɐ̃w]), officially the Town of Gavião (Portuguese: Vila de Gavião), is a Portuguese municipality in the District of Portalegre, in the historical region of Alentejo. The population in 2011 was 4,132, in an area of 294.59 km^{2}.

The municipality is bounded by Mação to the West and North, Nisa to the East, Crato to the Southeast, Ponte de Sor to the Southwest and Abrantes to the West.

Gavião received a foral from King D. Manuel I of Portugal on November the 23rd of 1519, nowadays, that day is celebrated as municipal holiday.

== Parishes ==
The municipality is composed of 4 parishes:

- Belver
- Comenda
- Gavião e Atalaia
- Margem

== Notable people ==
- Eusébio Leão (1864–1926) a Portuguese physician and republican politician.
- José Adriano Pequito Rebelo (1892–1983) a writer, politician and aviator.
- Francisco Rolão Preto (1893–1977) a Portuguese politician, journalist and fascist leader
