= Bruno Bolas =

Portuguese footballer

Personal information
- Full name: Bruno Miguel Miranda Bolas
- Date of birth: 24 June 1996 (age 30)
- Place of birth: Sousel, Portugal
- Height: 1.97 m (6 ft 5 1/2 in)
- Position: Goalkeeper

Team information
- Current team: O Elvas
- Number: 27

Youth career
- 2005–2012: Vidense
- 2012–2013: Estoril Praia
- 2013–2015: Chaves

Senior career*
Years	Team	Apps	(Gls)
2015	Vila Real	0	(0)
2016	AD Oliveirense	1	(0)
2016–2017	CD Gouveia	32	(0)
2017–2018	Águeda	11	(0)
2018–2023	Sporting Covilhã	34	(0)
2023–	O Elvas	1	(0)
- * Club domestic league appearances and goals as of 28 August 2023

Bruno Miguel Miranda Bolas (born 24 June 1996) is a Portuguese professional footballer who plays as a goalkeeper for Campeonato de Portugal club O Elvas.

== Club career ==
Bolas made his LigaPro debut for Sporting da Covilhã on 5 May 2019, in a 1–1 draw at home against Leixões.

On 24 August 2023, Bolas signed for Campeonato de Portugal side O Elvas. He made his debut for the club three days later, starting in a 1–1 draw away at Louletano.
