= Ponte de Sor =

- Municipality
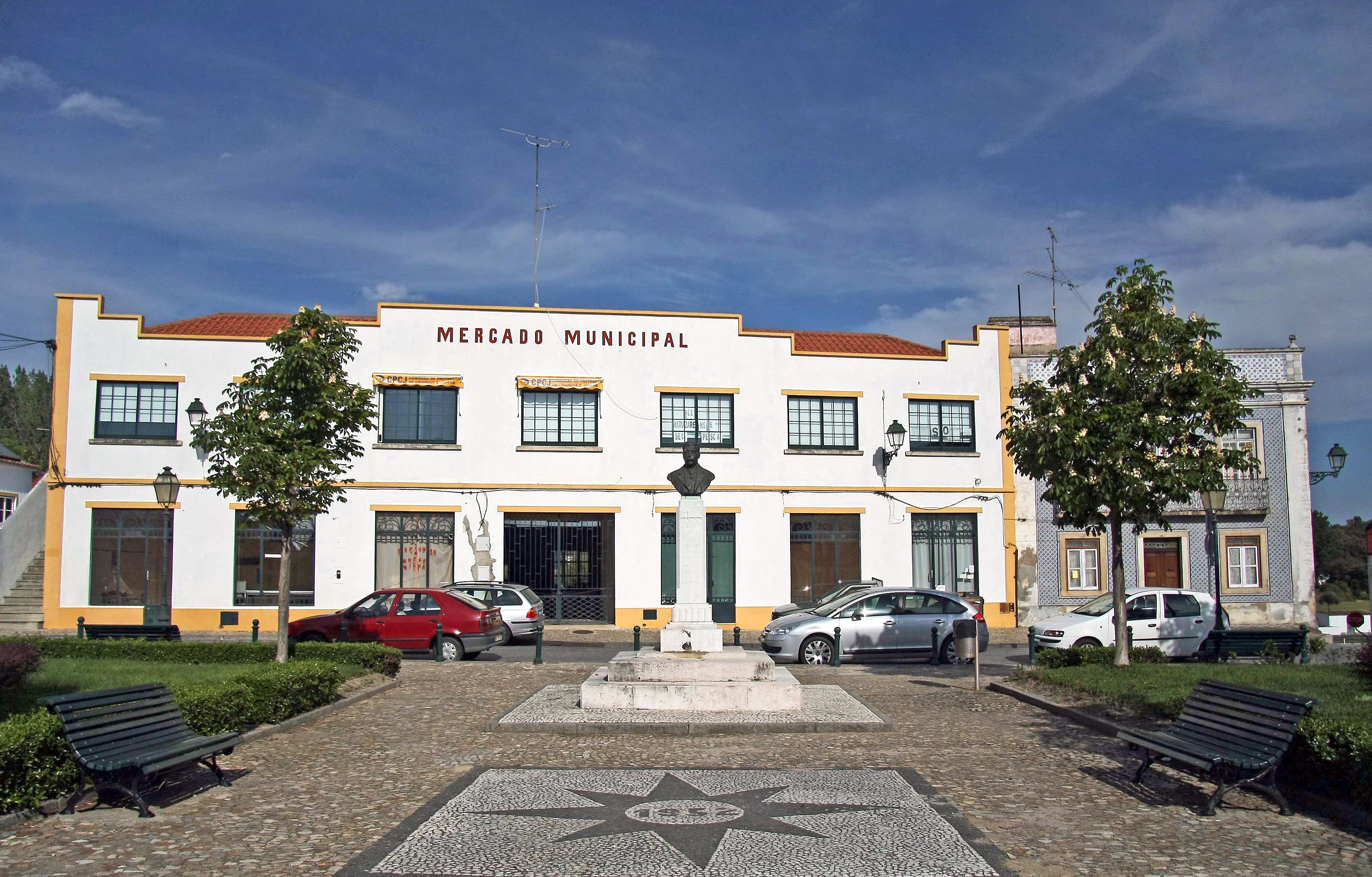

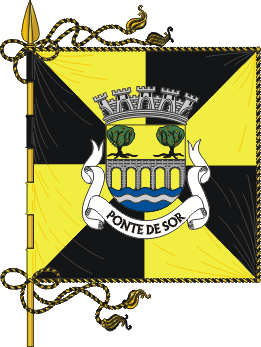
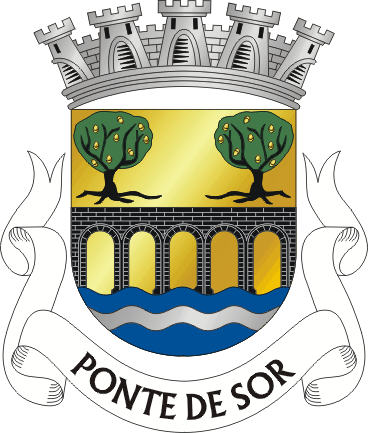
- Flag Coat of arms
- Interactive map of Ponte de Sor
- Coordinates: 39°15′N 8°01′W
- Country: Portugal
- Region: Alentejo
- Intermunic. comm.: Alto Alentejo
- District: Portalegre
- Parishes: 5

Government
  - President: Hugo Hilário (PS)

Area
  - Total: 839.71 km^{2} (324.21 sq mi)

Population (2011)
  - Total: 16,722
  - Density: 19.914/km^{2} (51.577/sq mi)
- Time zone: UTC+00:00 (WET)
  - Summer (DST): UTC+01:00 (WEST)
- Local holiday: Easter Monday date varies
- Website: www.cm-pontedesor.pt

Ponte de Sor (European Portuguese pronunciation: [ˈpõtɨ ðɨ ˈsoɾ]) is a city and municipality in Portalegre District in Portugal. The population in 2011 was 16,722, in an area of 839.71 km^{2}.

The present Mayor is Hugo Hilário, elected by the Socialist Party. The municipal holiday is Easter Monday.

== Economy ==
The economy of the municipality is based on agriculture – in particular the cork industry, of which the area is one of the biggest producers worldwide – services and light industries ranging from food to aviation. Ponte de Sor Aerodrome is base to several business, such as Sevenair Academy, the biggest flight school in Europe.

== Parishes ==
Administratively, the municipality is divided into 5 civil parishes (freguesias):

- Foros de Arrão
- Galveias
- Longomel
- Montargil
- Ponte de Sor, Tramaga e Vale de Açor

== Sport ==
Ponte de Sor is home to the football team Eléctrico, who play at the Estádio Municipal de Ponte de Sor.

== Notable people ==
- Vitória Pais Freire de Andrade (1883–1930) an active Portuguese feminist who also campaigned against bullfighting in Portugal.
- José Luís Peixoto (born 1974) a Portuguese author, poet and playwright.
- Laura Santana Maia (born 1937): first female judge in the Portuguese Supreme Court of Justice (2004-2007)
