= Sousel =

- Municipality
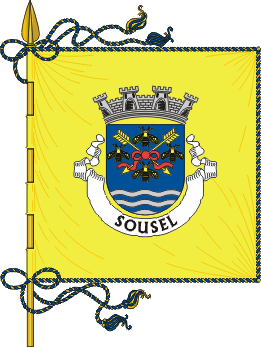
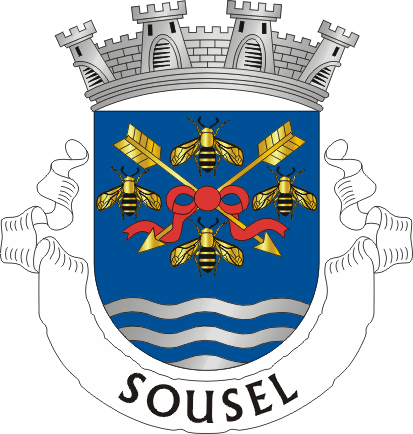
- Flag Coat of arms
- Interactive map of Sousel
- Coordinates: 38°57′N 7°40′W
- Country: Portugal
- Region: Alentejo
- Intermunic. comm.: Alto Alentejo
- District: Portalegre
- Parishes: 4

Government
  - President: Manuel Valério (PS)

Area
  - Total: 279.32 km^{2} (107.85 sq mi)

Population (2011)
  - Total: 5,074
  - Density: 18.17/km^{2} (47.05/sq mi)
- Time zone: UTC+00:00 (WET)
  - Summer (DST): UTC+01:00 (WEST)
- Local holiday: Easter Monday date varies
- Website: www.cm-sousel.pt

Sousel (European Portuguese pronunciation: [soˈzɛl]) is a municipality in the District of Portalegre in Portugal. The population in 2011 was 5,074, in an area of 279.32 km^{2}.

The municipality is famous for its olive trees and as a great hunting region.

The Calça e Pina family was the main developer of Sousel in the 18th century. The economy is mainly based on agriculture, but tourism plays a major role in the region's economy as well.

The present Mayor is Manuel Valério, elected by the Socialist Party. The municipal holiday is Easter Monday.

== Parishes ==
Administratively, the municipality is divided into 4 civil parishes (freguesias):

- Cano
- Casa Branca
- Santo Amaro
- Sousel

== Notable people ==
- Bruno Bolas (born 1996) a Portuguese professional footballer
- António Fernandes (born c. 1595 – died after 1680), Portuguese music theorist, conductor, and priest; born in Sousel
- Carlos Mourato (born 1950 - died 2026), Portuguese-Canadian businessman

== Gallery ==
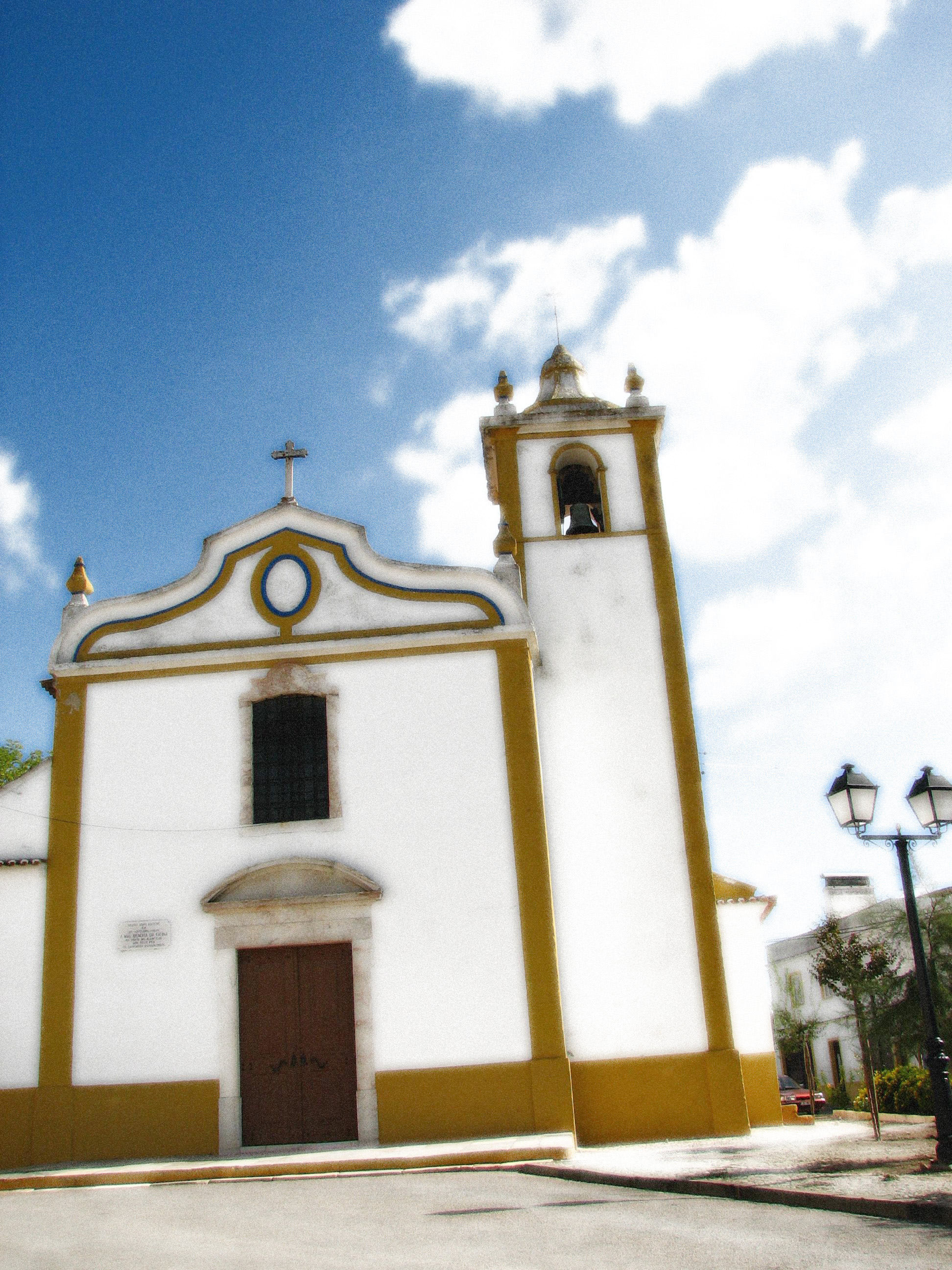
Local church.

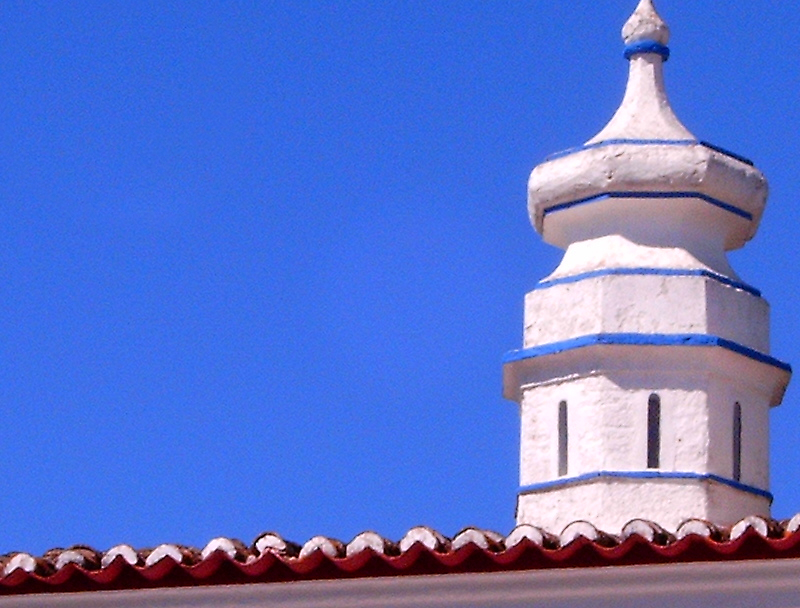
Distinctive Alentejano chimney.
