= Alto Alentejo (intermunicipal community) =

- Intermunicipal community
- Coordinates: 39.29°N 7.43°W
- Country: Portugal
- Region: Alentejo
- Established: 2009
- Seat: Portalegre
- Municipalities: 15

Area
  - Total: 6,084.34 km^{2} (2,349.18 sq mi)

Population (2011)
  - Total: 118,506
  - Density: 19.4772/km^{2} (50.4458/sq mi)
- Time zone: UTC+00:00 (WET)
  - Summer (DST): UTC+01:00 (WEST)
- Website: www.cimaa.pt

The Comunidade Intermunicipal do Alto Alentejo (European Portuguese: [ˈaltu ɐlẽˈtɛʒu]; "Intermunicipal Community of Upper Alentejo") is an administrative division in Portugal. It was created in 2009. The seat of the intermunicipal community is Portalegre. Alto Alentejo is coterminous with the former Portalegre District. The population in 2011 was 118,506, in an area of 6,084.34 km^{2}. Together with Alentejo Central it covers the area of the former Alto Alentejo Province. With Ponte de Sor the intermunicipal community also includes one municipality that lies in the area of the former Ribatejo Province.

Alto Alentejo is also a NUTS3 subregion of Alentejo Region, in Portugal. Since January 2015, the NUTS 3 subregion covers the same area as the intermunicipal community.

== Municipalities ==
The CIM Alto Alentejo is composed of 15 municipalities:

Municipality	Population (2011)	Area (km^{2})
Alter do Chão	3,562	362.07
Arronches	3,165	314.65
Avis	4,571	605.97
Campo Maior	8,456	247.20
Castelo de Vide	3,407	264.91
Crato	3,708	398.07
Elvas	23,078	631.29
Fronteira	3,410	248.60
Gavião	4,132	294.59
Marvão	3,512	154.90
Monforte	3,329	420.25
Nisa	7,450	575.68
Ponte de Sor	16,722	839.71
Portalegre	24,930	447.14
Sousel	5,074	279.32
Total	118,506	6,084.34
