= Portalegre District =

District of Portugal

Coordinates: 39°17′28″N 7°25′55″W

Portalegre
- District
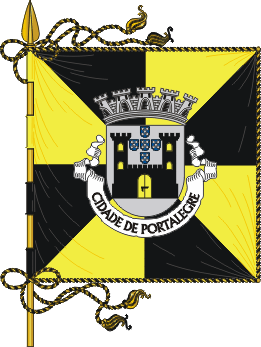
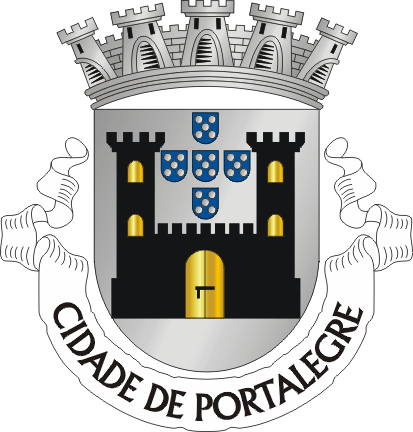
- Flag Coat of arms

- Localization of Portalegre within continental Portugal
- Country: Portugal
- Region: Alentejo Region
- Historical province: Alentejo
- Number of municipalities: 15
- Number of parishes: 72
- Capital: Portalegre

Area
  - Total: 6,065 km^{2} (2,342 sq mi)

Population
  - Total: 104,989
  - Density: 17.31/km^{2} (44.83/sq mi)
- ISO 3166 code: PT-12
- No. of parliamentary representatives: 2

Portalegre (Note: [puɾtɐˈlɛɣɾɨ]) is a district located in the east of Portugal. Its capital is the city of Portalegre.

As of 2021, it is the least populous district of Portugal. It borders Spain.

== Municipalities ==
The district is composed of 15 municipalities:

- Alter do Chão
- Arronches
- Avis
- Campo Maior
- Castelo de Vide
- Crato
- Elvas
- Fronteira
- Gavião
- Marvão
- Monforte
- Nisa
- Ponte de Sor
- Portalegre
- Sousel

== Summary of votes and seats won 1976–2022 ==
Summary of election results from Portalegre district, 1976–2022
Parties	%	S	%	S	%	S	%	S	%	S	%	S	%	S	%	S	%	S	%	S	%	S	%	S	%	S	%	S	%	S	%	S
Parties	1976		1979		1980		1983		1985		1987		1991		1995		1999		2002		2005		2009		2011		2015		2019		2022	
PS	41.9	3	29.8	1	32.4	1	38.5	2	23.7	1	25.1	1	33.5	1	50.5	2	51.2	2	45.3	2	54.9	2	38.3	1	32.4	1	42.4	1	44.7	2	47.2	2
PSD	10.1		In AD				19.1	1	20.9	1	37.4	1	38.9	2	23.4	1	22.5	1	30.6	1	20.2		23.8	1	32.5	1	In PàF		20.1		23.2	
PCP/APU/CDU	22.0	1	29.4	1	26.1	1	28.7	1	25.2	1	20.9	1	15.2		14.0		15.0		12.4		12.1		12.9		12.8		12.2		8.1		7.6	
AD			32.1	2	33.4	2																										
PàF																											27.6	1				
Total seats	4								3												2											
Source: Comissão Nacional de Eleições
