= List of freguesias of Portugal: G =

The freguesias (civil parishes) of Portugal are listed in by municipality according to the following format:

- concelho
  - freguesias

== Gavião ==
- Atalaia
- Belver
- Comenda
- Gavião
- Margem

== Góis ==
- Alvares
- Cadafaz
- Colmeal
- Góis
- Vila Nova do Ceira

== Golegã ==
- Azinhaga
- Golegã

== Gondomar ==
- Baguim do Monte (Rio Tinto)
- Covelo
- Fânzeres
- Foz do Sousa
- Gondomar (São Cosme)
- Jovim
- Lomba
- Medas
- Melres
- Rio Tinto
- São Pedro da Cova
- Valbom

== Gouveia ==
- Aldeias
- Arcozelo
- Cativelos
- Figueiró da Serra
- Folgosinho
- Freixo da Serra
- Gouveia (São Julião)
- Gouveia (São Pedro)
- Lagarinhos
- Mangualde da Serra
- Melo
- Moimenta da Serra
- Nabais
- Nespereira
- Paços da Serra
- Ribamondego
- Rio Torto
- São Paio
- Vila Cortês da Serra
- Vila Franca da Serra
- Vila Nova de Tazem
- Vinhó

== Grândola ==
- Azinheira Barros e São Mamede do Sádão
- Carvalhal
- Grândola
- Melides
- Santa Margarida da Serra

== Guarda ==
- Adão
- Albardo
- Aldeia do Bispo
- Aldeia Viçosa
- Alvendre
- Arrifana
- Avelãs da Ribeira
- Avelãs de Ambom
- Benespera
- Carvalhal Meão
- Casal de Cinza
- Castanheira
- Cavadoude
- Codesseiro
- Corujeira
- Faia
- Famalicão
- Fernão Joanes
- Gagos
- Gonçalo
- Gonçalo Bocas
- Guarda (São Vicente)
- Guarda (Sé)
- Jarmelo (São Miguel)
- Jarmelo (São Pedro)
- João Antão
- Maçainhas de Baixo
- Marmeleiro
- Meios
- Mizarela
- Monte Margarida
- Panoias de Cima
- Pega
- Pêra do Moço
- Pêro Soares
- Porto da Carne
- Pousada
- Ramela
- Ribeira dos Carinhos
- Rocamondo
- Rochoso
- Santana da Azinha
- São Miguel da Guarda
- Seixo Amarelo
- Sobral da Serra
- Trinta
- Vale de Estrela
- Valhelhas
- Vela
- Videmonte
- Vila Cortês do Mondego
- Vila Fernando
- Vila Franca do Deão
- Vila Garcia
- Vila Soeiro

== Guimarães ==
- Abação (São Tomé)
- Airão (Santa Maria)
- Airão (São João Baptista)
- Aldão
- Arosa
- Atães
- Azurém
- Balazar
- Barco
- Briteiros (Salvador)
- Briteiros (Santa Leocádia)
- Briteiros (Santo Estêvão)
- Brito
- Caldelas
- Calvos
- Candoso (Santiago)
- Candoso (São Martinho)
- Castelões
- Conde
- Costa
- Creixomil
- Donim
- Fermentões
- Figueiredo
- Gandarela
- Gémeos
- Gominhães
- Gonça
- Gondar
- Gondomar
- Guardizela
- Guimarães (Oliveira do Castelo)
- Guimarães (São Paio)
- Guimarães (São Sebastião)
- Infantas
- Leitões
- Longos
- Lordelo
- Mascotelos
- Mesão Frio
- Moreira de Cónegos
- Nespereira
- Oleiros
- Pencelo
- Pinheiro
- Polvoreira
- Ponte
- Prazins (Santa Eufémia)
- Prazins (Santo Tirso)
- Rendufe
- Ronfe
- Sande (São Clemente)
- Sande (São Lourenço)
- Sande (São Martinho)
- Sande (Vila Nova)
- São Faustino
- São Torcato
- Selho (São Cristóvão)
- Selho (São Jorge)
- Selho (São Lourenço)
- Serzedelo
- Serzedo
- Silvares
- Souto (Santa Maria)
- Souto (São Salvador)
- Tabuadelo
- Urgezes
- Vermil
