= Villeneuve =

Villeneuve, LaVilleneuve, deVilleneuve, or, Ville-Neuve, may refer to:

== People ==
- Villeneuve (surname)

== Places ==
=== Australia ===
- Villeneuve, Queensland, a town in the Somerset Region

=== Canada ===
- Circuit Gilles Villeneuve, a Formula One racetrack in Montréal
- Villeneuve (electoral district), a former federal electoral district
- Villeneuve, Alberta
  - Villeneuve Road

=== France ===
- Villeneuve, Ain, in the Ain département
- Villeneuve, Alpes-de-Haute-Provence, in the Alpes-de-Haute-Provence département
- Villeneuve, Ariège, in the Ariège département
- Villeneuve, Aveyron, in the Aveyron département
- Villeneuve, Gironde, in the Gironde département
- Villeneuve, Puy-de-Dôme, in the Puy-de-Dôme département
- Ville Neuve, Hennebont, in the Morbihan département
- Ville-neuve, Longwy, in the Meurthe-et-Moselle département
- Ville-neuve, Neuf-Brisach, in the Haut-Rhin département
- Ville Neuve de Sarrewerden, Sarre-Union, in the Bas-Rhin département
- Villeneuve-au-Chemin, in the Aube département
- Villeneuve-d'Allier, in the Haute-Loire département
- Villeneuve-d'Amont, in the Doubs département
- Villeneuve-d'Ascq, in the Nord département
- Villeneuve-d'Aval, in the Jura département
- Villeneuve-de-Berg, in the Ardeche département
- Villeneuve-de-Duras, in the Lot-et-Garonne département
- Villeneuve-de-la-Raho, in the Pyrénées-Orientales département
- Villeneuve-de-Marc, in the Isère département
- Villeneuve-de-Marsan, in the Landes département
- Villeneuve-d'Entraunes, in the Alpes-Maritimes département
- Villeneuve-de-Rivière, in the Haute-Garonne département
- Villeneuve-d'Olmes, in the Ariège département
- Villeneuve-du-Latou, in the Ariège département
- Villeneuve-du-Paréage, in the Ariège département
- Villeneuve-en-Montagne, in the Saône-et-Loire département
- Villeneuve-Frouville, in the Loir-et-Cher département
- Villeneuve-la-Comptal, in the Aude département
- Villeneuve-la-Comtesse, in the Charente-Maritime département
- Villeneuve-la-Dondagre, in the Yonne département
- Villeneuve-la-Garenne, in the Hauts-de-Seine département
- Villeneuve-la-Guyard, in the Yonne département
- Villeneuve-la-Lionne, in the Marne département
- Villeneuve-l'Archevêque, in the Yonne département
- Villeneuve-la-Rivière, in the Pyrénées-Orientales département
- Villeneuve-le-Comte, in the Seine-et-Marne département
- Villeneuve-Lécussan, in the Haute-Garonne département
- Villeneuve-le-Roi, in the Val-de-Marne département
- Villeneuve-lès-Avignon, in the Gard département
- Villeneuve-lès-Béziers, in the Hérault département
- Villeneuve-les-Bordes, in the Seine-et-Marne département
- Villeneuve-lès-Bouloc, in the Haute-Garonne département
- Villeneuve-les-Cerfs, in the Puy-de-Dôme département
- Villeneuve-lès-Charnod, in the Jura département
- Villeneuve-les-Corbières, in the Aude département
- Villeneuve-les-Genêts, in the Yonne département
- Villeneuve-lès-Lavaur, in the Tarn département
- Villeneuve-lès-Maguelone, in the Hérault département
- Villeneuve-lès-Montréal, in the Aude département
- Villeneuve-les-Sablons, in the Oise département
- Villeneuve-Loubet, in the Alpes-Maritimes département
- Villeneuve-Minervois, in the Aude département
- Villeneuve-Renneville-Chevigny, in the Marne département
- Villeneuve-Saint-Denis, in the Seine-et-Marne département
- Villeneuve-Saint-Georges, in the Val-de-Marne département
- Villeneuve-Saint-Germain, in the Aisne département
- Villeneuve-Saint-Nicolas, in the Eure-et-Loir département
- Villeneuve-Saint-Salves, in the Yonne département
- Villeneuve-Saint-Vistre-et-Villevotte, in the Marne département
- Villeneuve-sous-Charigny, in the Côte-d'Or département
- Villeneuve-sous-Dammartin, in the Seine-et-Marne département
- Villeneuve-sous-Pymont, in the Jura (département)|Jura département
- Villeneuve-sur-Allier, in the Allier département
- Villeneuve-sur-Auvers, in the Essonne département
- Villeneuve-sur-Bellot, in the Seine-et-Marne département
- Villeneuve-sur-Cher, in the Cher département
- Villeneuve-sur-Conie, in the Loiret département
- Villeneuve-sur-Fère, in the Aisne département
- Villeneuve-sur-Lot, in the Lot-et-Garonne département
- Villeneuve-sur-Verberie, in the Oise département
- Villeneuve-sur-Vère, in the Tarn département
- Villeneuve-sur-Yonne, in the Yonne département
- Villeneuve-Tolosane, in the Haute-Garonne département
- La Villeneuve, Creuse, in the Creuse département
- La Villeneuve, Saône-et-Loire, in the Saône-et-Loire département
- La Villeneuve-au-Châtelot, in the Aube département
- La Villeneuve-au-Chêne, in the Aube département
- La Villeneuve-Bellenoye-et-la-Maize, in the Haute-Saône département
- La Villeneuve-en-Chevrie, in the Yvelines département
- La Villeneuve-lès-Charleville, in the Marne département
- La Villeneuve-les-Convers, in the Côte-d'Or département
- La Villeneuve-sous-Thury, in the Oise département
- Lavilleneuve, in the Haute-Marne département
- Lavilleneuve-aux-Fresnes, in the Haute-Marne département
- Lavilleneuve-au-Roi, in the Haute-Marne département
- La Ville Neuve, Lorient, in the Morbihan département

=== Italy ===
- Villeneuve, Aosta Valley

=== Switzerland ===
- Villeneuve, Fribourg
- Villeneuve, Vaud

== Facilities and structures ==
- Ville neuve, Longwy, one of the fortifications of Vauban in Meurthe-et-Moselle, France
- Ville neuve, Neuf-Brisach, one of the fortifications of Vauban in Haut-Rhin, France
- Villeneuve-les-Vertus Aerodrome, a WWI airfield near Vertus, Marne, France

== Other uses ==
- Ville Neuve, 2018 Canadian film

== See also ==
- Villenave
- Villanova (disambiguation)
- Villanueva (disambiguation)
