= Vilanova =

Vilanova may refer to:

== People ==
- Amanda Vilanova (born 1991), Puerto Rican beauty pageant title holder
- Francisco Machón Vilanova, Salvadoran novelist
- Galcerand de Vilanova, Bishop of Urgel and Co-Prince of Andorra
- João Batista Vilanova Artigas (1912-1985), Brazilian architect
- Manuel Adriano Vilanova, Salvadoran politician and physician
- Marc Bertrán Vilanova (born 1982), Spanish footballer
- Sandra Vilanova (born 1981), Spanish footballer
- Tito Vilanova (1968-2014), Spanish footballer and manager
- Xavier Vilanova i Montiu (1902-1965), Catalan dermatologist

== Places ==
=== Brazil ===
- Fazenda Vilanova, municipality in the state Rio Grande do Sul

=== Spain ===
==== Asturias ====
- Villanueva de Oscos, (Galician-Asturian: Vilanova d'Ozcos) municipality in the comarca of Eo-Navia

==== Catalonia ====
- Vilanova d'Escornalbou, village in the province of Tarragona
- Vilanova de Bellpuig, village in the province of Lleida
- Vilanova de l'Aguda, municipality in the province of Lleida
- Vilanova de Meià, municipality in the province of Lleida
- Vilanova de Prades, municipality in the province of Tarragona
- Vilanova de Sau, town in the province of Barcelona
- Vilanova de Segrià, village in the province of Lleida
- Vilanova del Camí, municipality in the province of Barcelona
- Vilanova del Vallès, village in the province of Barcelona
- Vilanova de la Barca, municipality in the province of Lleida
- Vilanova i la Geltrú, city in the province of Barcelona

==== Galicia ====
- Vilanova de Arousa, municipality in the province of Pontevedra

==== Valencian Community ====
- Vilanova d'Alcolea, a municipality in the province of Castelló

== Sports ==
- CF Vilanova, football team from Vilanova i la Geltrú
- CP Vilanova, roller hockey team from Vilanova i la Geltrú

== Other ==
- Battle of Vilanova, battle of the Portuguese Restoration War
- Diari de Vilanova, newspaper published in Garraf, Catalonia
- Vilanova International World Music Festival, multicultural festival of music, workshops and conferences

== See also ==
- Vila Nova (disambiguation)
- Villa Nova (disambiguation)
- Villanova (disambiguation)
- Villanueva (disambiguation)
- Villeneuve (disambiguation)
- Vilafranca (medieval town)
