= Montainville =

Montainville may refer to:

- Montainville, Eure-et-Loir, a commune in the Eure-et-Loir department in France
- Montainville, Yvelines, a commune in the Yvelines department in France
