= Villa Nueva =

Villa Nueva may mean any of the following geographical locations:

- Argentina
  - Villa Nueva, Buenos Aires, in Berisso Partido
  - Villa Nueva, Córdoba
  - Villa Nueva, Mendoza
  - Villa Nueva, Santiago del Estero
- Guatemala
  - Villa Nueva, Guatemala
- Mexico
  - Villa Nueva, Oaxaca, see Area codes in Mexico by code (900–999)
  - Sacramento, Coahuila, founded as Villa Nueva

== See also ==
- Villanueva (disambiguation)
