= Vila Nova =

Vila Nova (Portuguese for "new town") may refer to:

== Places ==
=== Brazil ===
- Vila Nova, Rio Grande do Sul, a neighbourhood in Porto Alegre
- Vila Nova, Joinville, Santa Catarina, a neighbourhood in Joinville

=== Mozambique ===
- Vila Nova de Fronteira, a locality in the district of Mutarara, province of Tete

=== Portugal ===
==== Municipalities ====
- Vila Nova da Barquinha, a municipality in the district of Santarém
- Vila Nova de Cerveira, a municipality in the district of Viana do Castelo
- Vila Nova de Famalicão, a municipality in the district of Braga
- Vila Nova de Foz Côa, a municipality in the district of Guarda
- Vila Nova de Gaia, a municipality in the district of Porto
- Vila Nova de Paiva, a municipality in the district of Viseu
- Vila Nova de Poiares, a municipality in the district of Coimbra

==== Parishes ====
- Vila Nova (Miranda do Corvo), a parish in the municipality of Miranda do Corvo
- Vila Nova (Praia da Vitória), a parish in the municipality of Praia da Vitória, Azores
- Vila Nova da Barca, a parish in the municipality of Montemor-o-Velho
- Vila Nova da Baronia, a parish in the municipality of Alvito
- Vila Nova da Muía, a parish in the municipality of Ponte da Barca
- Vila Nova da Rainha (Azambuja), a parish in the municipality of Azambuja
- Vila Nova da Rainha (Tondela), a parish in the municipality of Tondela
- Vila Nova da Telha, a parish in the municipality of Maia
- Vila Nova de Anços, a parish in the municipality of Soure
- Vila Nova de Cacela, a parish in the municipality of Vila Real de Santo António
- Vila Nova de Milfontes, a parish in the municipality of Odemira
- Vila Nova de Monsarros, a parish in the municipality of Anadia
- Vila Nova de Oliveirinha, a parish in the municipality of Tábua
- Vila Nova de São Pedro, a parish in the municipality of Azambuja
- Vila Nova de Souto d'El-Rei, a parish in the municipality of Lamego
- Vila Nova de Tazem, a parish in the municipality of Gouveia
- Vila Nova do Ceira, a parish in the municipality of Góis

== Other uses ==
- Vila Nova Futebol Clube, a Brazilian football club

== See also ==
- Villa Nova (disambiguation)
- Vilanova (disambiguation)
- Villanova (disambiguation)
