= Bento de Moura Portugal =

Portuguese aristocrat, knight and scientist

Bento de Moura Portugal FRS, Moimenta da Serra, Gouveia (March 21, 1702) - Lisbon (January 27, 1766), was a Portuguese inventor, scientist, lawyer, and university professor at the University of Coimbra. He was a Portuguese aristocrat, a Knight of the Order of Christ, and a Member of the Royal Society. He is remembered for improving the steam engine designed by Thomas Savery. Also referred to as Bento de Moura, he was a proponent of Newtonian science and often referred to as the "Portuguese Newton."

== Life ==
Bento de Moura Portugal' was born in Moimenta da Serra (Gouveia, Portugal), and in 1741, he was elected a Fellow of the Royal Society of London for his scientific contributions, particularly in improving Savery's "fire engine."

He was born on March 21, 1702, in Moimenta da Serra, and the house where he lived still exists. At the end of the street, in the church square, you can find his bust. He received a comprehensive education, possibly from Jesuits priests, as he had a lifelong affinity for them and defended the Society until his death. He certainly did not study at the College of the Society of Jesus in Gouveia, as it opened its doors after 1739, by which time Bento de Moura Portugal was already traveling across Europe. He was the grandson of D. Pedro Castanheira de Moura from the House of Sinde and the natural son of Manuel de Moura. His brothers grew up in São Gião, in one of the most beautiful and impressive houses in the region, flanked by the Chapel of Our Lady of Creation.

He entered the University of Coimbra in 1721 and graduated in Laws in 1731. He traveled to Hungary even before completing his studies, and although he was a lawyer, his true interest had always been in mathematics and physics. He was a man of science.

In Europe, Newtonian Science was spreading, and Bento de Moura Portugal was one of the first enthusiasts of Newton outside the United Kingdom. He traveled throughout Europe, where he worked on projects related to pneumatics and the study of gases, contributing to the improvement of the steam engine, which earned him an invitation to become a Fellow of the Royal Society of London in 1741. He was a respected physicist in the Europe of his time, with contributions to the study of tides, mechanics (hydraulics and pneumatics), and also to cartography.

In Lisbon in 1742, under the watchful eye of the Portuguese Royal Family and some members of the court, Dr. Bento Moura Portugal demonstrated a "Fire Engine," his improved version of Savery's steam engine. It was upon his return from a journey, allegedly to Brazil, that he had the incident with the Inquisition. He went to trial for "heretical and scandalous propositions" and for the assembly of those "fire engines." The process lasted three years, and he only escaped severe punishment by issuing a public written recantation on February 5, 1748.

Contemporary sources describe him as a protege of King D. João V, who had already granted him a carriage to travel throughout the Kingdom., in 1744, he awarded him an annual stipend of 12,000 reis and honored him with the habit of a Knight of the Order of Christ in 1750, making him a Knight. This, along with being the grandson of D. Pedro Castanheda de Moura, a Familiar of the Holy Office, and having good relations with some church members, may have earned him a lighter sentence in his first trial. He was sent on further trips by D. João V, and during his absence from the country, legal proceedings where he served as a lawyer were suspended and only resumed upon his return.

He was sent on a scholarship to various European countries, including Hungary, and in Portugal, Moura Portugal contributed to various improvements in the Kingdom, with much of his work focused on hydraulics. Examples include the construction of dikes on the Tejo River, such as the one in Vila Velha de Rodão and further north on the Mondego River. Projects aimed at preventing harmful floods for the surrounding agricultural lands. Additionally, Bento designed a hydraulic wheel to drain waterlogged lands in the Paúl de Fôja, in Coimbra, and developed drainage systems for swamps in Vila Nova de Magos, Juncal, and Tresoito in Ribatejo. Bento de Moura Portugal also served as the Superintendent and Conservator of the Royal Factories of the "Fundiçam of Artelharia of the Comarca of Thomar", commonly known as the "ferrarias," located in Figueiró dos Vinhos, where weapons and tools for the Empire were produced.

In 1760, upon his return from his last trip and during the reign of D. Joseph I, Bento de Moura Portugal was imprisoned by the order of the Secretary of State for the Interior of the Kingdom, Sebastião José de Carvalho e Melo, still Count of Oeiras. He was accused of treason for publicly defending the innocence of the Society of Jesus and the Távora family. He was also accused of proposing amendments to legislation that, according to the minister, harmed the royal treasury. His influence with the Infantes of Portugal and the support of the Meninos de Palhavã were of no avail.

Bento de Moura Portugal FRS was incarcerated in the Fort of São João da Junqueira in July 1960, gradually becoming insane, where he shared a cell with "O Marquesinho". He died on January 27, 1766, in the Forte da Junqueira Prison, in Lisbon, from where he wrote Inventos e vários planos de melhoramento para este Reino, manuscripts saved with the contribution of Conde de S. Lourenço and published in 1821 by Antônio Ribeiro Saraiva.

== Inventions ==
=== Steam engine ===
On February 6, 1742, the Gazeta de Lisboa reported that Queen D. Maria Ana and her children traveled to Belém to observe a scientific innovation: two machines constructed by Dr. Bento de Moura Portugal FRS, "which, through the weight of the air and the force of steam, lifted water, with cold providing the opportunity for the weight of the air to reconvert the vapors, in which the heat had transformed, into water." The term "steam engine" was not yet in use at the time, and the press was unfamiliar with it. The article also mentioned that D. João V had previously visited Belém to observe machines whose origin was attributed to the "Marquês de Worcester, and the invention of his practice to Captain Savery, both of the English nation." However, the text nearly concealed a crucial detail: the mechanism invented by Thomas Savery at the end of the previous century had been improved by Bento de Moura Portugal, allowing for more efficient operation and eliminating the need for manual labor.

Around ten years later, Portugal's improvements were internationally recognized when they were featured in the "Philosophical Transactions," a compendium of inventions acknowledged by the Royal Society of London. Bento de Moura Portugal had been named a Fellow of the Royal Society in 1741, and his contribution to steam engine enhancement was notable. The publication by the Royal Society described the refinement that enabled the machine to operate autonomously, representing a significant advancement that was later praised by the English engineer John Smeaton, one of the pioneers in locomotive engineering.

It's worth noting that the first industrial steam engine did not arrive in Portugal until 1821, more than 80 years after the death of Fellow Bento de Moura Portugal, unlike what happened in most European countries.

=== Suspension system ===
Bento de Moura Portugal FRS developed what is considered the precursor to suspension systems applied in vehicles, which can be seen in the National Coach Museum in both King D. John V's coach and others built later.

The system consists of a box-like coach mounted on four wheels, resting on a longitudinal wooden bar and suspended by strong leather straps arranged obliquely between the lower angles and the uprights. The coach is closed by two articulated doors (the one on the right with a deep slit) and eight windows, the two largest on the main elevations. The suspension system consists of four laminated springs located near the lower corners of the coach, along with sturdy leather straps and "elastic springs."

The complex system of leather straps and "elastic springs" was designed to reduce the impact of road irregularities, preventing the box from falling onto the axle. The suspension system included a series of steel or metal springs installed between the vehicle body and the wheels, with the help of leather straps, allowing the coach to move up and down, absorbing road shocks and vibrations, significantly improving passenger comfort in carriages and coaches, making trips smoother and less uncomfortable.

== Trials and imprisonment ==
Bento de Moura Portugal FRS, known as the "Newton of Portugal" due to his remarkable scientific contributions, faced a life filled with trials and challenges that culminated in his imprisonment.

=== First trial (1745–1748) ===
Bento de Moura Portugal's first trial occurred from 1745 and extended until 1748. He was accused of advocating heretical and scandalous propositions related to religion and the Catholic Church. The trial was conducted by the Lisbon Inquisition, which investigated his critical and jesting statements about religion and his controversial opinions.

The charges against Bento were grounded in both ideological sympathies with Bartolomeu de Gusmão and the statements he made about miracles and religious relics. Among these observations, Bento expressed skepticism about events considered sacred, such as the body of Saint Catherine of Bologna and the uncorrupted tongue of Saint Anthony of Padua, going as far as to claim that the body of Saint Catherine resembled a withered skeleton and the tongue of Saint Anthony looked more like a piece of black bread than something worthy of devotion. He also used playful language to criticize the Church and its traditions, questioning the validity of miracles and biblical passages.

Bento questioned, for instance, why demons could not interfere with human bodies, arguing that they were preoccupied with their own torments in hell. Additionally, he raised questions about the narrative of miracles, such as the birth of Christ and the delivery of the laws to Moses, using his sense of humor and witty attitude.

The ensuing inquiry lasted for nearly three years, with witnesses being heard in different locations where Bento had spent time. The witnesses repeated the "propositions" made by Bento and highlighted his irreverent and critical style regarding religion. The inquiry led the Inquisition Tribunal to request a prison sentence for Bento de Moura Portugal, based in part on his friendship with Alexandre de Gusmão, who was seen as the "main source of the scandals disturbing the kingdom." However, in this trial, Bento escaped a harsher sentence. He was pardoned with a written recantation, in which he asked for forgiveness for any offense and claimed that his words had been misinterpreted, committing not to discuss such matters further.

This first trial cast a shadow over Bento's reputation, but it did not deter him from pursuing his passion for science and innovation. He continued to contribute important inventions and improvements to the Kingdom, many of which were recorded in the 28 brown paper notebooks shared with the help of the Jesuit João de Matos while later incarcerated in the Junqueira prison. These inventions demonstrated that, despite the controversies, Bento de Moura Portugal remained dedicated to the pursuit of knowledge and progress.

=== Second trial and imprisonment (1760–1766) ===
In 1760, Bento de Moura Portugal was summoned by the Court of Inconfidência, facing a second trial. This time, the charges were related to his defense of the Távora family and the Jesuits, as well as his critical opinions about the rule of D. Joseph I. Bento was a figure of prestige and influence with the royal family, but this did not protect him from the political intrigues of the period. The Marquis of Pombal, who played a prominent role in Portuguese politics, was among his opponents. This trial demonstrated Bento's vulnerability to the political powers of the time.

The second trial and subsequent imprisonment of Bento de Moura Portugal cast a lasting shadow over the life of this eminent 18th-century scientist and inventor in Portugal. The second accusation in 1760 emerged in the midst of a turbulent period in Portugal under the rule of the Marquis of Pombal and resulted in severe consequences for Bento.

In this second trial, Bento was summoned by the Court of Inconfidência, accused of a series of offenses that had incurred the wrath of the powerful Prime Minister, including the defense of the innocence of the Távora family and the Jesuits, open criticism of the rule of D. Joseph I, and the proposal of amendments to legislation that, according to him, harmed the royal treasury. Pombal did not hide his displeasure toward Bento, despite the prestige he enjoyed within the royal family. Bento de Moura Portugal was then imprisoned in July 1760 in the Junqueira Fort, a prison that had been converted and opened the year before to accommodate Jesuits and nobles who had been accused of conspiring against the king. The imprisonment marked the end of Bento's freedom and influence in society. He remained there until his death in 1766, deprived of his liberty but not of his creative mind.

In prison, Bento de Moura Portugal continued to work on his innovations and scientific ideas. With the help of the Jesuit João de Matos, his cellmate and makeshift scribe, he documented his inventions in 28 notebooks on brown paper, resulting in the work "Inventos e vários planos de melhoramento para este Reino." He wrote these notes using a chicken bone and rust ink. These notes serve as a remarkable testament to his dedication to science, even in the most challenging conditions.

His innovations and scientific contributions, some of which describe solutions to agricultural and mechanical issues, formed part of his legacy.

== Conclusion ==
Engineer Bento de Moura Portugal, an FRS born on March 21, 1702, in Beira Alta, was a brilliant mind of his time. He devoted part of his knowledge and life to the Kingdom of Portugal and is best known for developing the precursor to the steam engine, which laid the foundation for the steam locomotive, based on Thomas Savery's "fire engine."

During his travels across Europe, he learned Newtonian philosophy from some of the most notable disciples of Isaac Newton during his time in England, which contributed to his election as a Fellow of the Royal Society of London (FRS). In Portugal, he held positions as a professor at the University of Coimbra, a lawyer, and an aristocrat. He was a Professed Knight of the Order of Christ, and his status was elevated to that of a nobleman by King D. João V. However, his return to Portugal ultimately led to a tragic end to his life.

After facing imprisonment and trials, Bento de Moura Portugal's dramatic life took a tragic turn. While incarcerated in the Junqueira prison, he wrote letters to King D. José, offering him advice, and authored the work "Inventos e vários planos de melhoramento para este Reino." These manuscripts were saved thanks to the intervention of the Count of S. Lourenço and were later edited by António Ribeiro Saraiva. Bento de Moura Portugal died on January 27, 1766, only six years after being imprisoned. Some sources indicate his death as occurring in 1776.

Before falling from grace, this remarkable scientist was entrusted by the Marquis of Pombal with the regency of certain courses in the extensively reformed Faculty of Natural Philosophy at the University of Coimbra. His contributions were also recognized internationally. The German scientist Osterrieder mentioned him, stating, "After the great Newton in England, only Bento de Moura in Portugal!"

Alberto Teles de Utra Machado and Rómulo de Carvalho are some of the prominent intellectuals who wrote about his life and work. Teodoro de Almeida sought to ensure that he was not forgotten and expressed admiration for Bento's unique qualities as an outstanding intellectual. This public recognition has endured in the account of his innovative theoretical model to explain the phenomenon of tides, as described by Teodoro de Almeida in the "Cartas Físico Mathematicas." His work is a testament to the tribute paid by Teodoro de Almeida to Bento's merits and an implicit criticism of the despotic and inhumane actions of those responsible for his misfortune.

In his tiny cell in the Junqueira prison, where others like the Távoras also suffered, Moura Portugal managed to secure improvised materials to write secretly about various notes and inventions. These notes were posthumously published 61 years later in a book titled "Inventos e vários planos de melhoramento para este Reino." It's evident that improving the kingdom was challenging due to the lack of scientists and free thinkers, as only one more Portuguese name was added to the list of fellows of the Royal Society during the 19th and 20th centuries.

== Family relations ==
Bento de Moura Portugal, an FRS, belonged to the old Portuguese aristocracy. He was the grandson of Dom Pedro Castanheda de Moura, a Portuguese noble, and the great-grandson of Commander Dom Jerónimo de Baticela of the Order of Christ, and of Dona Inês Afonso from the powerful House of Sinde, with origins in the Moura family of Castelo Rodrigo, commonly associated with Cristóvão de Moura and Távora, the Marquis of Castelo Rodrigo, who served as Viceroy of Portugal during the Philippine Dynasty. He also had connections to the House of Vimioso, descending from Dom Cristóvão de Moura Portugal, a Portuguese noble, and the grandson by illegitimate birth of the Count of Vimioso and also 1st Marquis of Aguiar. During the Portuguese Restoration War, Dom Cristóvão de Moura Portugal sided with the opposition to the other Cristóvão, which earned him his name, as his grandmother was the daughter of the Marquis of Castelo Rodrigo. Bento did not have any known descendants, so he made his nephews his heirs. His father was Manuel de Moura, a Portuguese noble and military figure, and he had at least two more children, who were the children of his sister Maria de Moura Portugal, whom Bento made his heirs. Maria de Moura Portugal is the mother of Manuel Félix de Moura Portugal, a Noble and Captain of the town of Gouveia, who was also a Professed Knight of the Order of Christ. She is the grandmother of Dr. Judge José Caetano de Moura Portugal, who served as a Magistrate in Santa Maria da Feira, and of Lord Thomaz de Moura Portugal, Lord of Honor of Moimenta and Lord of Honor of Teixoso, who owned the Moura Portugal Manor in Rio Torto.

He was great-great-uncle of the Moura Portugal family of Rio Torto, known by them educated and enlightened women of his time who founded the first female school in the region, as mentioned by Fina D'Armada in her work "Republicanas quase esquecidas" He was also a third-generation uncle of aviator Ester de Moura Portugal and biologist Maria Margarida Moura Portugal Craveiro Lopes. His niece Craveiro Lopes served as a deputy in the VI legislature of the National Assembly and was one of the first female deputies in the Portuguese Assembly.

Bento FRS descended from illustrious figures from Kingdom of Portugal, whom he highly esteemed. The Moura Portugal family is a noble family from Beira Alta with strong connections to landownership, associated with Abreu and Freire de Andrade families of São Gião, they originated from the join of the House of Moura and Távora of Castelo Rodrigo and the House of the Count of Vimioso, also 1st Marquis of Aguiar Dom Afonso of Portugal, this join were where the family got the name Moura Portugal. they are also descendants of Brás Garcia Mascarenhas a noble and Portuguese poet of the 17th century, from the Royal Prince John of Portugal, Duke of Valencia de Campos and the Cunha family through Roque Fernandes Abreu de Eça, the son of the Lords of Tábua and by himself Lord of Nespereira and Lord of Lusinde, who held the Lands of Moimenta and the Lands of Teixoso. In the 19th century, they became administrators of the Chorido Lands in Gouveia, established in the summer of 1737 through the marriage of João do Amaral Cardoso Garcia Castelo-Branco and Maria Josefa de Espirito Santo Abranches Mascarenhas. The family's earliest references in Beira Alta can be traced to their Solar in São Gião, near the Chapel of Senhora da Criação, which they built and where Bento de Moura Portugal FRS's brothers grew up.
