= Villanova =

Villanova is a name of Latin origin, meaning new town. It is equivalent to Italian Villanuova, French Villeneuve, Spanish Villanueva, and Catalan, Galician, Occitan and Portuguese Vilanova. It may refer to:

== Botany ==
- Villanova, a genus of plants in the family Phyllanthaceae, an illegitimate name replaced by Flueggea (bushweed)
- Villanova (plant), a genus of plants in the family Asteraceae

== Education ==
- Villanova University, an American university established in 1842 in Pennsylvania, by the Augustinian Order (formerly known as Villanova College)
  - Villanova Wildcats, the athletic program of Villanova University
- St. Thomas of Villanova College, an Augustinian university preparatory school in King City, Ontario, Canada
- Villanova College (Australia), a current school run by the Augustinian priests, located in Coorparoo, in Brisbane, Queensland
- Villanova Preparatory School, a college preparatory school in Ojai, California
- Black Rock Middle School

== Geography and history ==
- Villanova, Pennsylvania, a neighborhood in the suburbs of Philadelphia
  - Villanova (SEPTA Regional Rail station), the station on Philadelphia's SEPTA Regional Rail Paoli/Thorndale Line
- Villanova d'Asti, a town in the Province of Asti, Piedmont, Italy
- Villanova Monferrato, a town in the Province of Alessandria, Piedmont, Italy
- Villanova Monteleone, a comune (municipality) in the Province of Sassari in the Italian region Sardinia
- Villanova Tulo, a comune (municipality) in the Province of Cagliari in the Italian region Sardinia
- Villanova Canavese, a town in the Metropolitan city of Turin, Piedmont, Italy
- Villanova, a frazione in the municipality of Bagnacavallo, province of Ravenna, Emilia-Romagna, Italy
- Villanova, a frazione in the municipality of Castenaso, province of Bologna, Emilia-Romagna, Italy
  - Villanovan Culture, the predecessor to the Etruscan civilization culture, named after the frazione of Castenaso
- Villanova, a frazione in the municipality of Ostuni, Puglia, in Italy
- Villanova, Corse-du-Sud, a commune of the Arrondissement of Ajaccio in Corsica
- Vilanova de Arousa, a town in the Province of Pontevedra, Galicia, Spain
- Villanova, Huesca, a municipality in Huesca (province), Spain
- Villanova, Ribagorza (AKA Vilanova d'Éssera), a village in the autonomous community of Aragon, Spain

== Literature ==
- "Villanova" (short story), a 2002 short story by John Hodgman

== Names ==
- Arnaldus de Villa Nova (c. 1235–1313), alchemist, astrologer, and physician
- Saint Thomas of Villanova (born Tomás García Martínez, 1488–1555), Spanish Augustinian friar and archbishop

== See also ==
- Vila Nova (disambiguation)
- Villa Nova (disambiguation)
- Vilanova (disambiguation)
- Villanova College (disambiguation)
- Villanueva (disambiguation)
- Villeneuve (disambiguation)
