= Château de Villefranche =

Castle and stately home in Occitania, France

Coordinates: 43°46′11″N 1°24′55″E

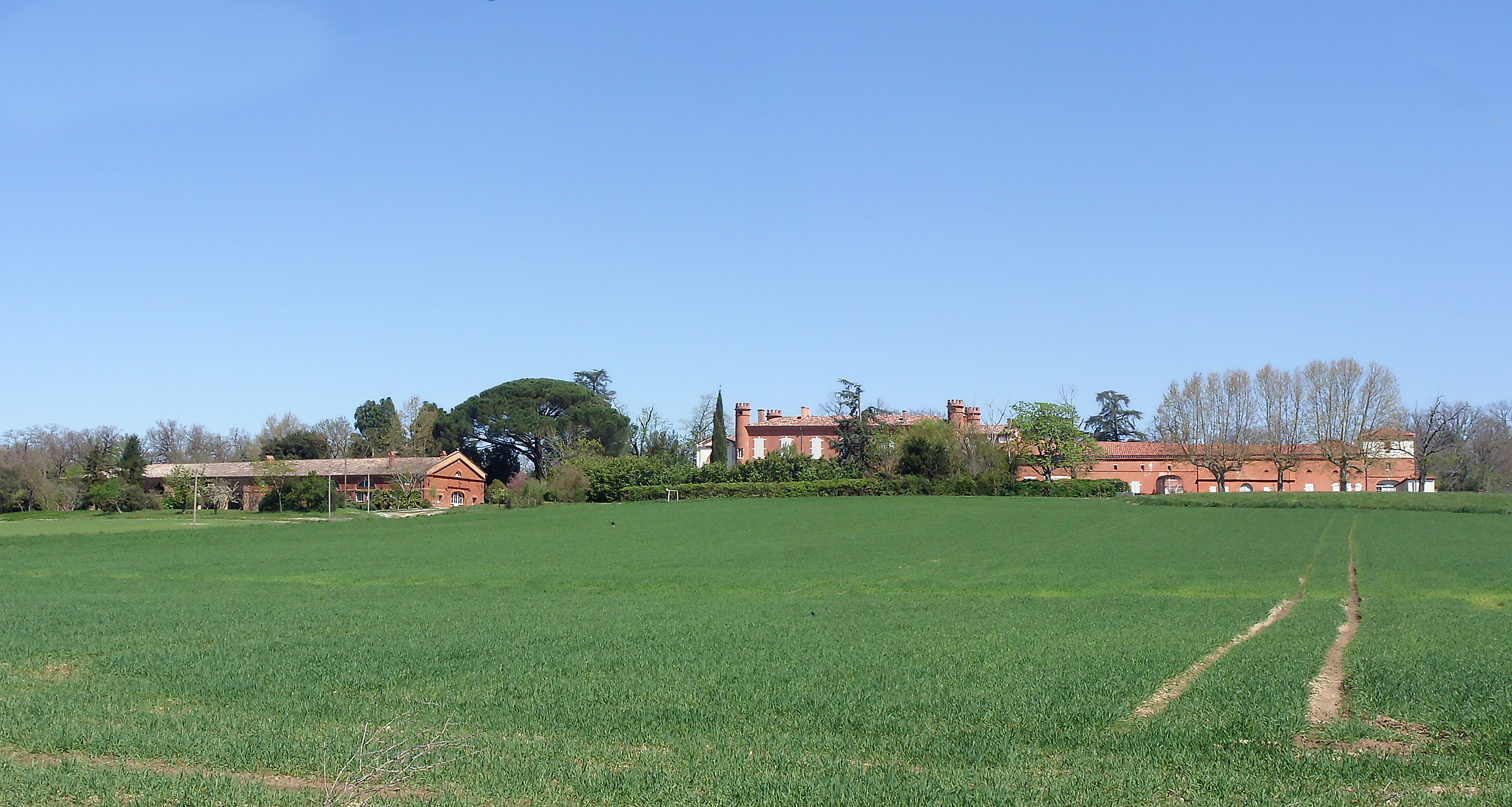
General view

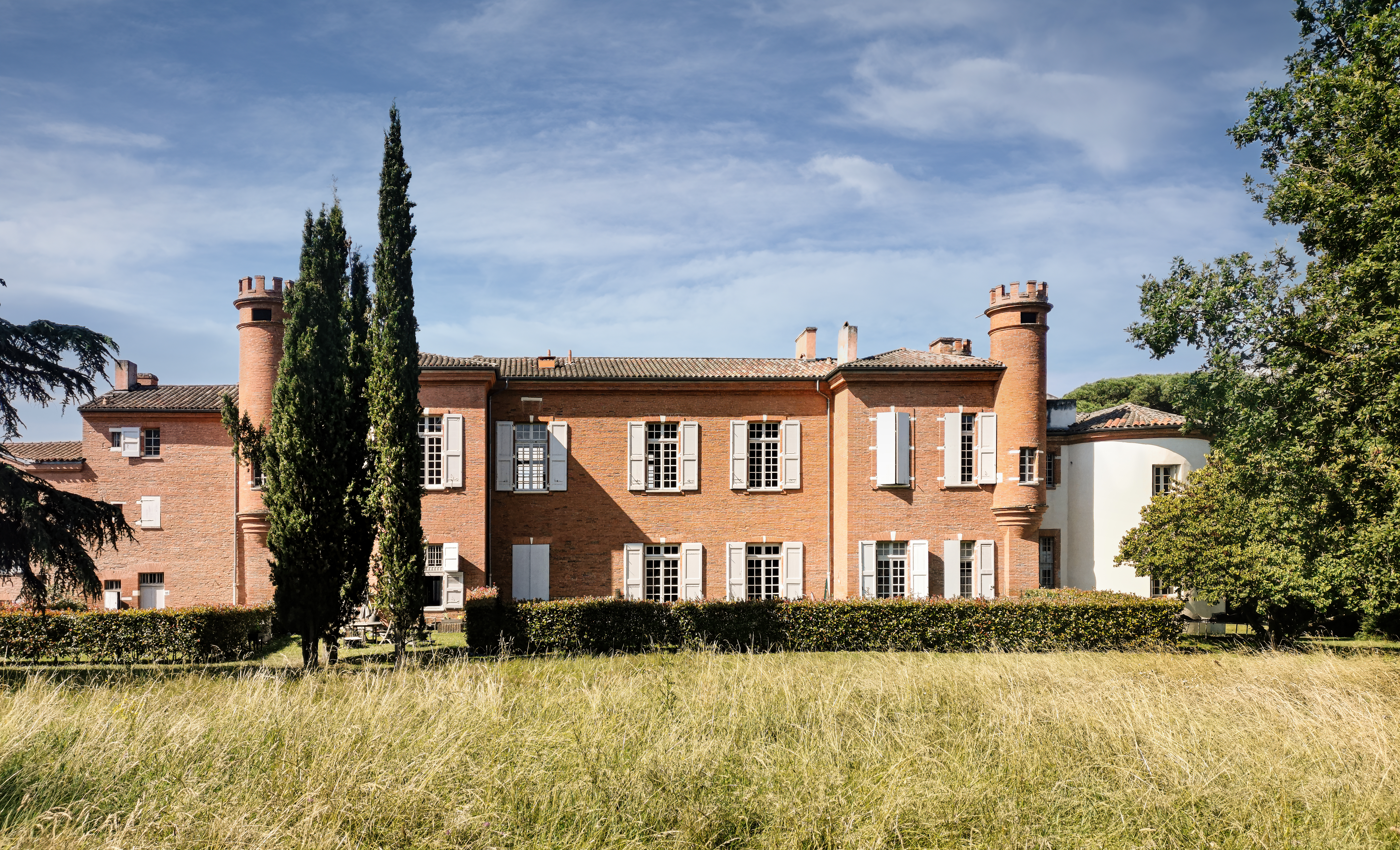
Castle and chapel, north-east view

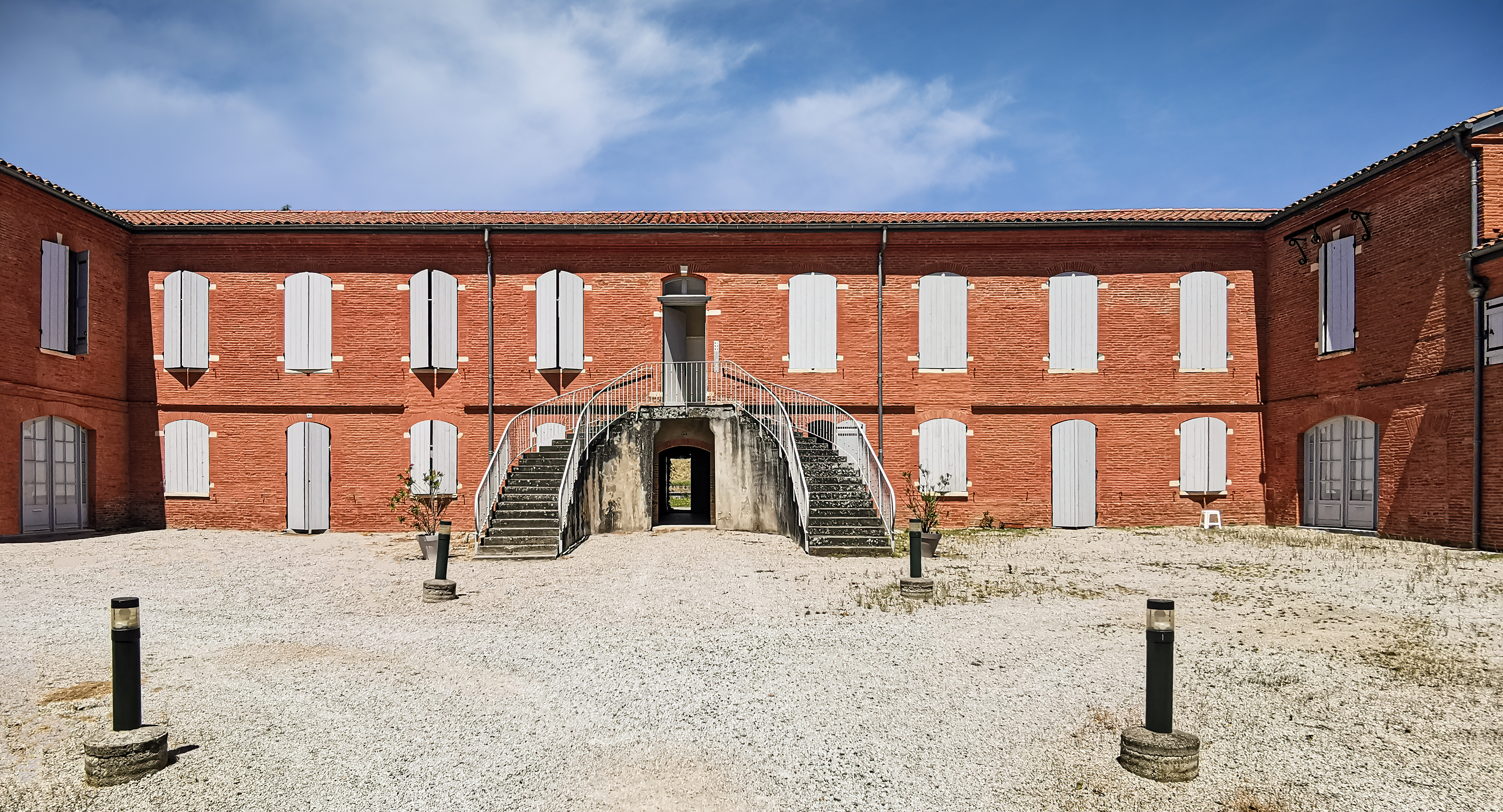
Inner courtyard

The Château de Villefranche is a castle and stately home in the commune of Villeneuve-lès-Bouloc in the Haute-Garonne département of France. Originally built in the 16th century, it was transformed in the 18th and 19th centuries.

Seat of the joint lord of Villeneuve-lès-Bouloc, the castle was a grand house from the end of the 16th century, redeveloped in line with contemporary taste in the 18th and 19th centuries. The residence, surrounded by old parkland and gardens, maintains its Renaissance era scale and an architectural doorway. Inside, several rooms are decorated with wallpaper from the 1810s. The out-buildings include 18th century farm buildings and a sheep pen dated 1868. Privately owned, it has been listed since 2005 as a monument historique by the French Ministry of Culture.

== See also ==
- List of castles in France
