= Villa Nova =

Villa Nova may refer to:

== Places ==
- Villa Nova, Mauritania, Modern Algeria, a titular see of the Roman Catholic Church
- Villa Nova, Ohio, United States, an unincorporated community

== Other uses ==
- Arnaldus de Villa Nova, Aragonese physician
- Villa Nova (Laurinburg, North Carolina), United States, a historic home
- Villa Nova Atlético Clube, Brazilian football club

== See also ==
- Nova Villa, Filipino actress
- Rainbow Bar and Grill, West Hollywood, California, United States, originally called Villa Nova Restaurant
- Vila Nova (disambiguation)
- Vilanova (disambiguation)
- Villanova (disambiguation)
