= Aromas, Jura =

Commune in Bourgogne-Franche-Comté, France

Aromas
- Commune
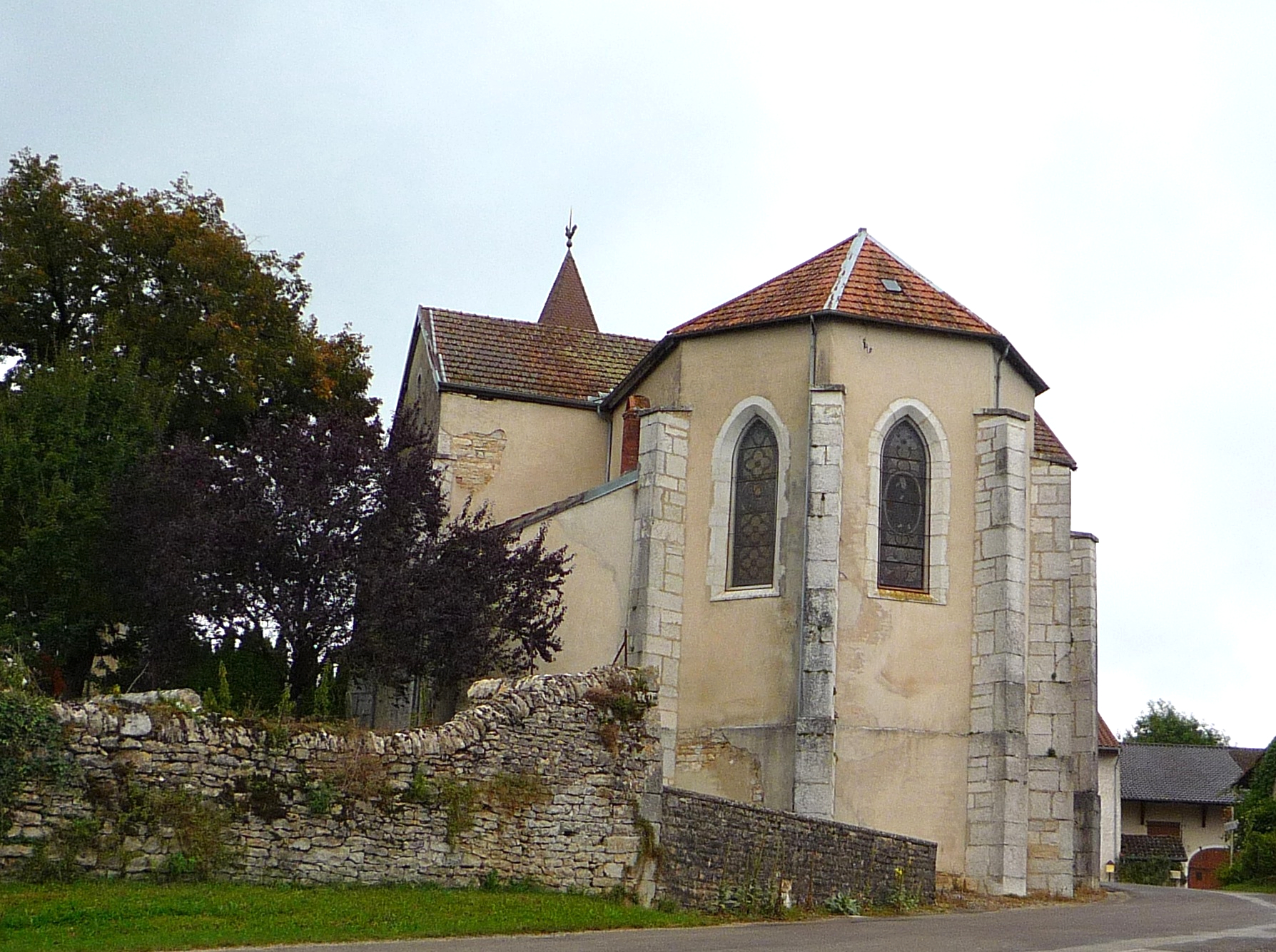
- The church in Aromas
- Location of Aromas
- Location within France Location within Bourgogne-Franche-Comté
- Coordinates: 46°17′36″N 5°28′53″E
- Country: France
- Region: Bourgogne-Franche-Comté
- Department: Jura
- Arrondissement: Lons-le-Saunier
- Canton: Moirans-en-Montagne

Government
  - Mayor (2020–2026): Evelyne Rozek
- Area^{1}: 25.80 km^{2} (9.96 sq mi)
- Highest elevation: 660 m (2,170 ft)
- Lowest elevation: 390 m (1,280 ft)
- Population (2023): 580
  - Density: 22/km^{2} (58/sq mi)
- Time zone: UTC+01:00 (CET)
  - Summer (DST): UTC+02:00 (CEST)
- INSEE/Postal code: 39018 /39240
- ^{1} French Land Register data, which excludes lakes, ponds, glaciers > 1 km^{2} (0.386 sq mi or 247 acres) and river estuaries.

Aromas (French pronunciation: [aʁɔma]) is a commune in the Jura department in the region of Bourgogne-Franche-Comté in eastern France. On 1 January 2017, the former commune of Villeneuve-lès-Charnod was merged into Aromas.

== Population ==
Historical population
Year	Pop.	±% p.a.
1968	495	—
1975	439	−1.70%
1982	408	−1.04%
1990	407	−0.03%
1999	560	+3.61%
2007	613	+1.14%
2012	630	+0.55%
2017	652	+0.69%
2023	580	−1.93%
Source: INSEE

Population data refer to the area corresponding with the commune as of January 2025.

== See also ==
- Communes of the Jura department
