= Villanueva =

Villanueva (from Spanish villa nueva, 'new town') may refer to:

== Places ==
=== Colombia ===
- Villanueva, Bolívar, a town and municipality in Bolívar Department
- Villanueva, Casanare, a town and municipality in Casanare Department
- Villanueva, La Guajira, a town and municipality in La Guajira Department
- Villanueva, Santander, a town and municipality in Santander Department

=== Honduras ===
- Villanueva, Cortés, a municipality in Cortés department, Honduras

=== Mexico ===
- Villanueva, Zacatecas, a town in Zacatecas, Mexico

=== Nicaragua ===
- Villanueva, Chinandega, municipality in the Chinandega Department

=== Philippines ===
- Villanueva, Misamis Oriental, a municipality in Misamis Oriental province

=== Spain ===
- Villanueva (Navia), a parish in Asturias
- Villanueva (Ribadedeva), a parish in Asturias
- Villanueva (Santo Adriano), a parish in Asturias
- Villanueva (Teverga), a parish in Asturias
- Villanueva (parish), a parish in Villanueva de Oscos, Asturias
- Hiriberri/Villanueva de Aezkoa, a town in Navarre

=== United States ===
- Villanueva, New Mexico, a village in New Mexico

== Other uses ==
- Villanueva University
- Villanueva (surname)
- CD Villanueva, a football team in Villanueva de Córdoba, Andalusia, Spain
- Villanueva CF, a Spanish football team in Villanueva de Gállego, Aragon, Spain
- Villanueva F.C., a football team in Villanueva, Cortés, Honduras
- Villanueva State Park, a New Mexico State Park
- Villanueva River, a tributary of the Cesar River in Colombia

== See also ==
- Villa Nueva (disambiguation)
- Villeneuve (disambiguation)
- Villanova (disambiguation)
- Vilanova (disambiguation)
