= Marcilly-lès-Buxy =

- Commune
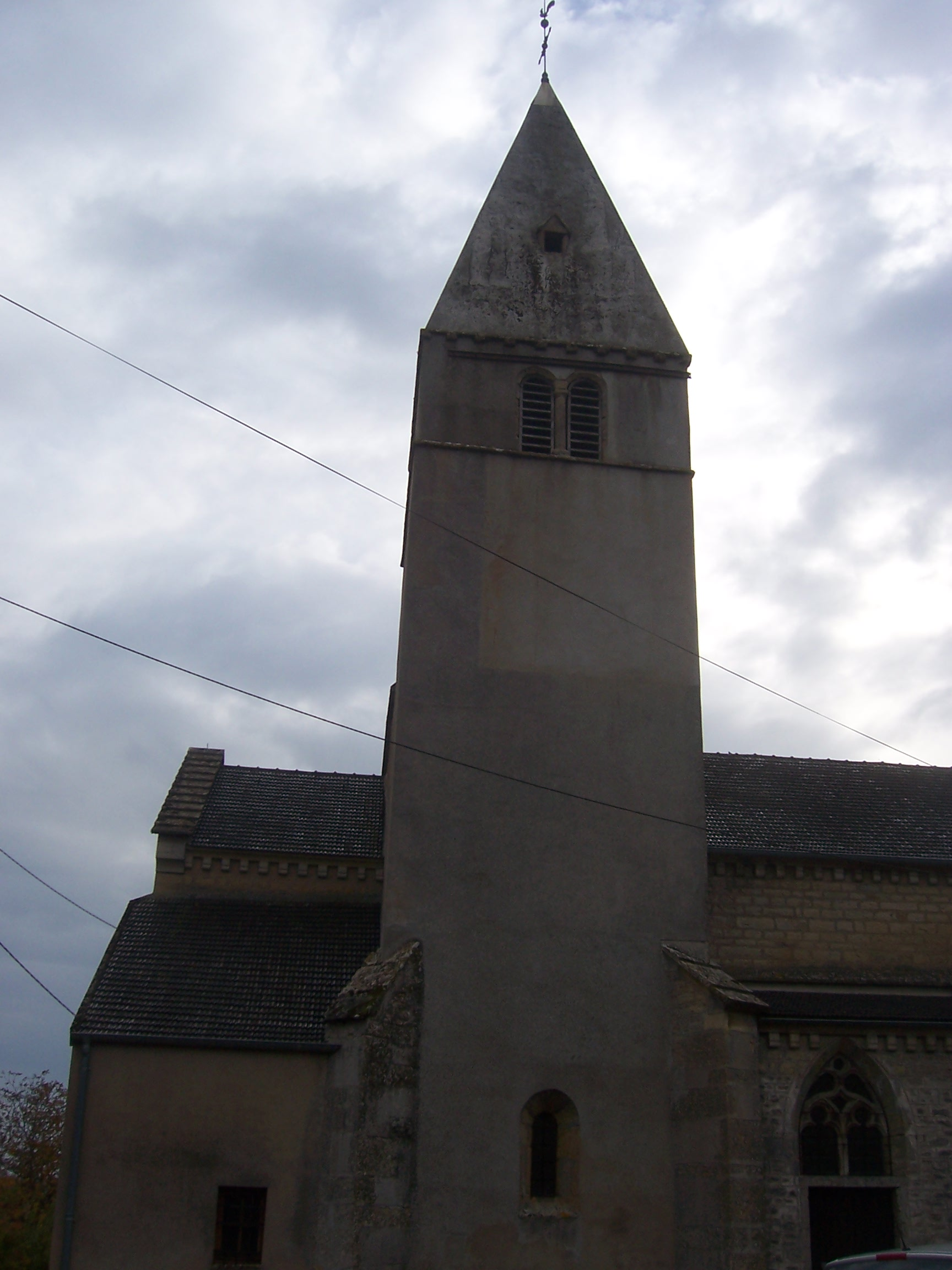
- The church in Marcilly-lès-Buxy

- Coat of arms
- Location of Marcilly-lès-Buxy
- Location within France Location within Bourgogne-Franche-Comté
- Coordinates: 46°43′08″N 4°35′47″E
- Country: France
- Region: Bourgogne-Franche-Comté
- Department: Saône-et-Loire
- Arrondissement: Chalon-sur-Saône
- Canton: Givry
- Intercommunality: Sud Côte Chalonnaise

Government
  - Mayor (2020–2026): Florent Marillier
- Area^{1}: 18.98 km^{2} (7.33 sq mi)
- Elevation: 371 m (1,217 ft)
- Highest elevation: 476 m (1,562 ft)
- Lowest elevation: 264 m (866 ft)
- Population (2023): 704
  - Density: 37.1/km^{2} (96.1/sq mi)
- Time zone: UTC+01:00 (CET)
  - Summer (DST): UTC+02:00 (CEST)
- INSEE/Postal code: 71277 /71390
- ^{1} French Land Register data, which excludes lakes, ponds, glaciers > 1 km^{2} (0.386 sq mi or 247 acres) and river estuaries.

Marcilly-lès-Buxy is a commune in the Saône-et-Loire department in the region of Bourgogne-Franche-Comté in eastern France.

== See also ==
- Communes of the Saône-et-Loire department
- Col des Baudots
