= Les Villages Vovéens =

- Commune
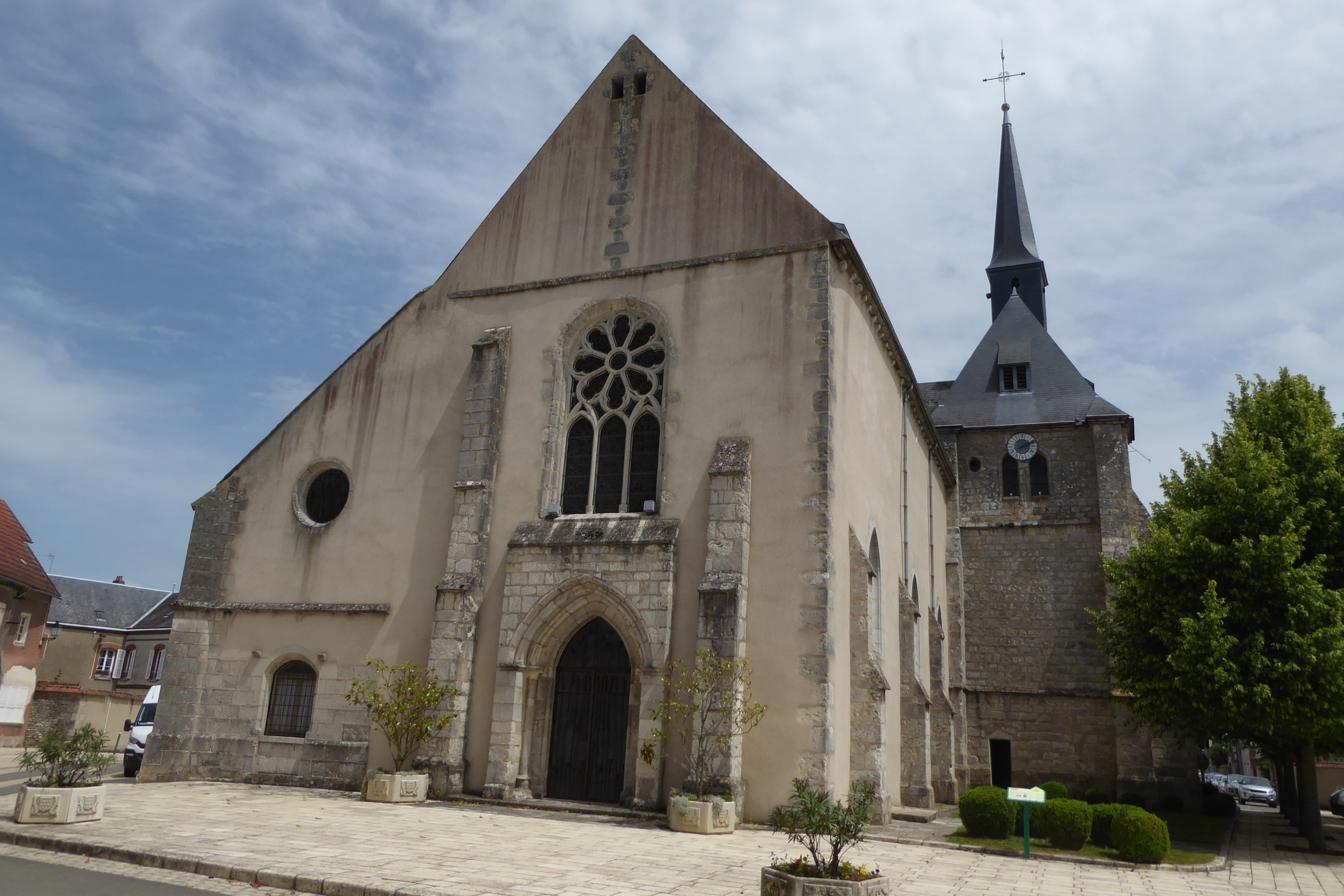
- The church in Voves
- Location of Les Villages Vovéens
- Location within France Location within Centre-Val de Loire
- Coordinates: 48°16′16″N 1°37′37″E
- Country: France
- Region: Centre-Val de Loire
- Department: Eure-et-Loir
- Arrondissement: Chartres
- Canton: Les Villages Vovéens
- Intercommunality: Cœur de Beauce

Government
  - Mayor (2020–2026): Marc Guerrini
- Area^{1}: 62.85 km^{2} (24.27 sq mi)
- Population (2023): 4,009
  - Density: 63.79/km^{2} (165.2/sq mi)
- Time zone: UTC+01:00 (CET)
  - Summer (DST): UTC+02:00 (CEST)
- INSEE/Postal code: 28422 /28150
- ^{1} French Land Register data, which excludes lakes, ponds, glaciers > 1 km^{2} (0.386 sq mi or 247 acres) and river estuaries.

Les Villages Vovéens (French pronunciation: [le vilaʒ vɔveɛ̃], literally The Voves' Villages) is a commune in the Eure-et-Loir department of northern France. The municipality was established on 1 January 2016 by merger of the former communes of Voves, Montainville, Rouvray-Saint-Florentin and Villeneuve-Saint-Nicolas.

== Population ==
Population data refer to the commune in its geography as of January 2025.

Historical population
Year	Pop.	±% p.a.
1968	3,103	—
1975	3,131	+0.13%
1982	3,379	+1.09%
1990	3,331	−0.18%
1999	3,543	+0.69%
2007	3,555	+0.04%
2012	3,760	+1.13%
2017	3,945	+0.97%
2023	4,009	+0.27%
Source: INSEE

== See also ==
- Communes of the Eure-et-Loir department
