= Villeneuve-en-Montagne =

- Commune
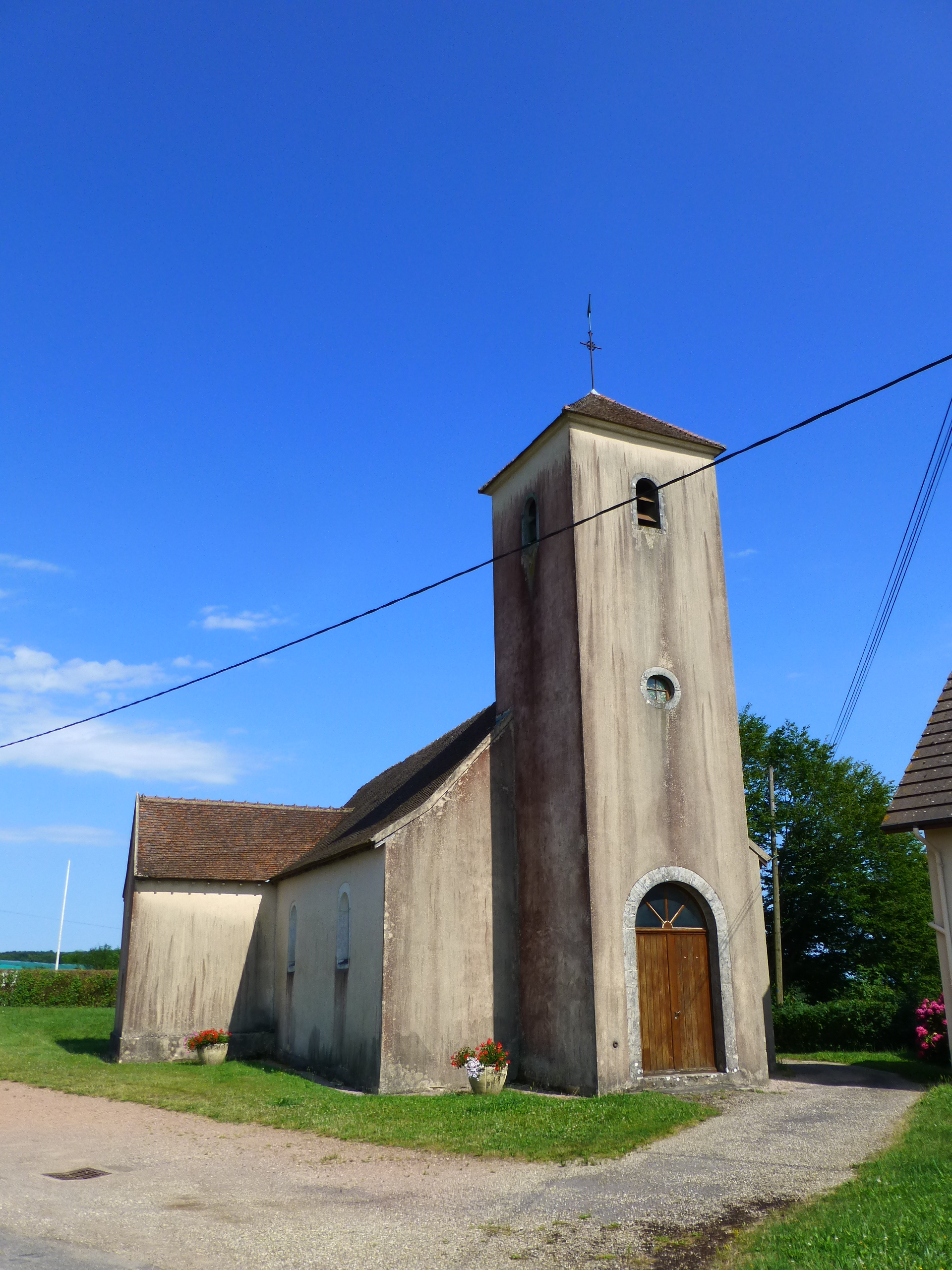
- The church in Villeneuve-en-Montagne

- Coat of arms
- Location of Villeneuve-en-Montagne
- Location within France Location within Bourgogne-Franche-Comté
- Coordinates: 46°46′11″N 4°36′34″E
- Country: France
- Region: Bourgogne-Franche-Comté
- Department: Saône-et-Loire
- Arrondissement: Chalon-sur-Saône
- Canton: Givry
- Area^{1}: 15.57 km^{2} (6.01 sq mi)
- Elevation: 456 m (1,496 ft)
- Highest elevation: 476 m (1,562 ft)
- Lowest elevation: 279 m (915 ft)
- Population (2023): 177
  - Density: 11.4/km^{2} (29.4/sq mi)
- Time zone: UTC+01:00 (CET)
  - Summer (DST): UTC+02:00 (CEST)
- INSEE/Postal code: 71579 /71390
- ^{1} French Land Register data, which excludes lakes, ponds, glaciers > 1 km^{2} (0.386 sq mi or 247 acres) and river estuaries.

Villeneuve-en-Montagne is a commune in the Saône-et-Loire department in the region of Bourgogne-Franche-Comté in eastern France.

== See also ==
- Communes of the Saône-et-Loire department
- Col des Baudots
