= Voves =

- Part of Les Villages Vovéens
- Coat of arms
- Location of Voves
- Location within France Location within Centre-Val de Loire
- Coordinates: 48°16′22″N 1°37′38″E
- Country: France
- Region: Centre-Val de Loire
- Department: Eure-et-Loir
- Arrondissement: Chartres
- Canton: Voves
- Commune: Les Villages Vovéens
- Area^{1}: 32.98 km^{2} (12.73 sq mi)
- Elevation: 148 m (486 ft)
- Highest elevation: 156 m (512 ft)
- Lowest elevation: 139 m (456 ft)
- Population (2022): 3,322
  - Density: 100.7/km^{2} (260.9/sq mi)
- Time zone: UTC+01:00 (CET)
  - Summer (DST): UTC+02:00 (CEST)
- Postal code: 28150
- ^{1} French Land Register data, which excludes lakes, ponds, glaciers > 1 km^{2} (0.386 sq mi or 247 acres) and river estuaries.

Voves (French pronunciation: [vɔv]) is a former commune in the Eure-et-Loir department in central France. On 1 January 2016, it was merged into the new commune of Les Villages Vovéens.

== Population ==
Historical population
| Year | Pop. | ±% p.a. |
|---|---|---|
| 1793 | 1,044 | — |
| 1901 | 2,021 | +0.61% |
| 1962 | 2,352 | +0.25% |
| 1968 | 2,506 | +1.06% |
| 1975 | 2,619 | +0.63% |
| 1982 | 2,834 | +1.13% |
| 1990 | 2,785 | −0.22% |
| 1999 | 2,928 | +0.56% |
| 2022 | 3,322 | +0.55% |
Source: EHESS and INSEE

== See also ==
- Communes of the Eure-et-Loir department
