= Cadafaz e Colmeal =

- Civil parish
- Location in Portugal
- Coordinates: 40.135°N 8.053°W
- Country: Portugal
- Region: Centro
- Intermunic. comm.: Região de Coimbra
- District: Coimbra
- Municipality: Góis

Area
  - Total: 70.16 km^{2} (27.09 sq mi)

Population (2011)
  - Total: 348
  - Density: 4.96/km^{2} (12.8/sq mi)
- Time zone: UTC+00:00 (WET)
  - Summer (DST): UTC+01:00 (WEST)

Cadafaz e Colmeal is a Portuguese parish in the municipality of Góis. It was formed in 2013 by the merger of the former parishes Cadafaz and Colmeal. The population in 2011 was 348, in an area of 70.16 km^{2} (27.09 sq mi).
