= Villanova College =

Villanova College may refer to:

- Villanova College (Australia), a private Roman Catholic school for boys in Brisbane, Queensland, Australia
- Villanova College (Canada), also known as "St Thomas of Villanova College", a middle school and high school in King City, Ontario, Canada
- Villanova University, a private research university located in Philadelphia, Pennsylvania, United States
