= Góis =

- Municipality
- Town of Góis
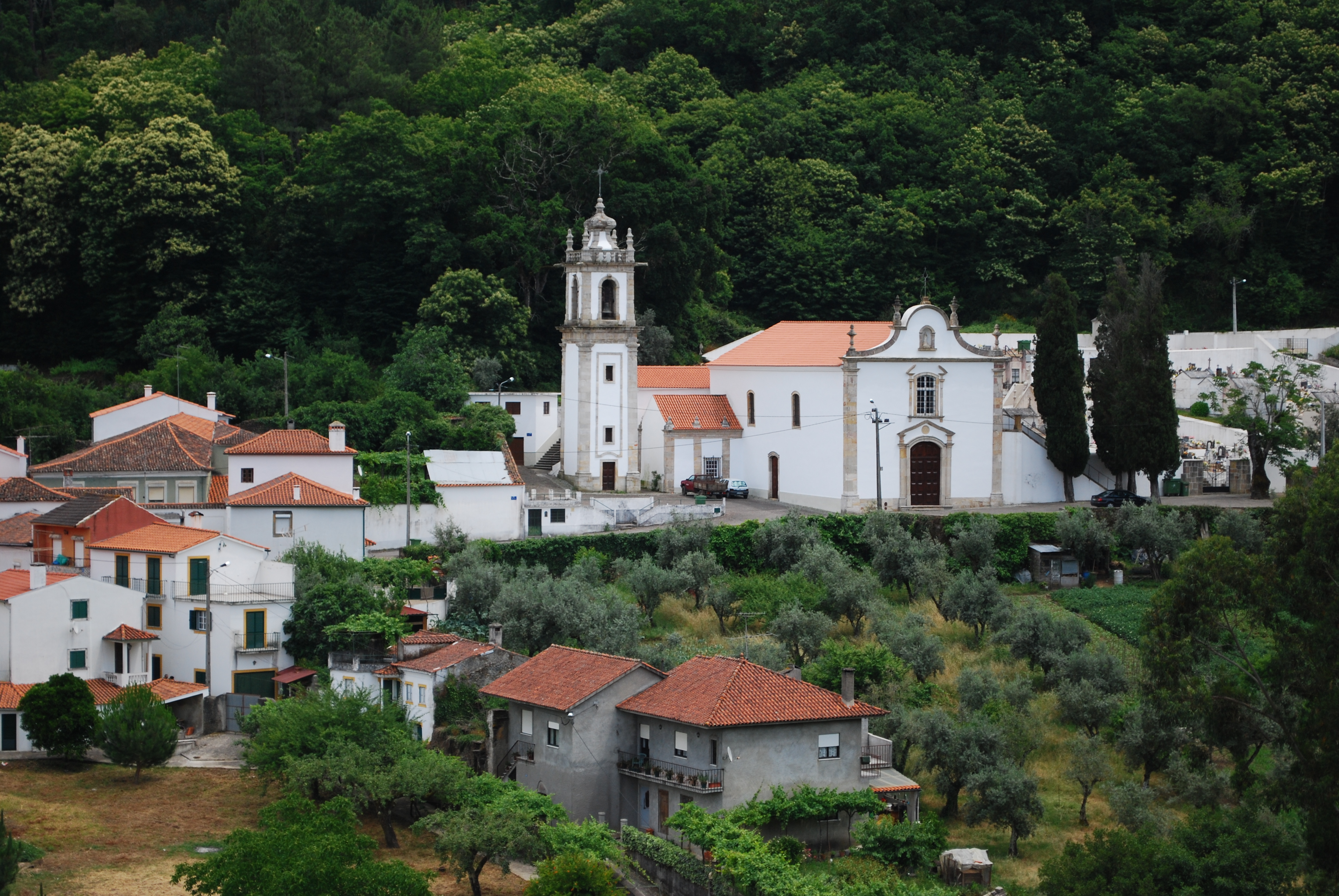
- The Church of Santa Maria Maior in Góis

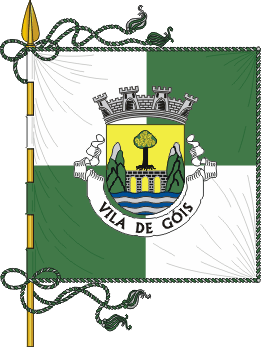
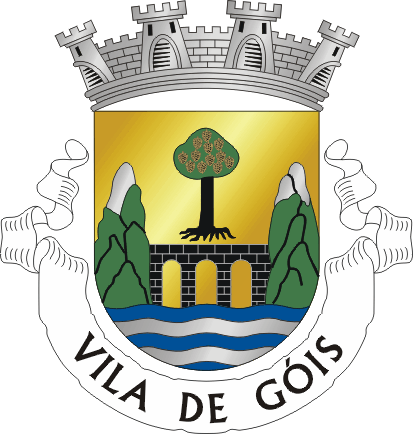
- Flag Coat of arms
- Interactive map of Góis
- Location in Portugal
- Coordinates: 40°9′17″N 8°6′38″W
- Country: Portugal
- Region: Centro
- Intermunic. comm.: Região de Coimbra
- District: Coimbra
- Parishes: 4

Government
  - President: José António Pereira de Carvalho (PS)

Area
  - Total: 263.30 km^{2} (101.66 sq mi)
- Highest elevation: 1,131 m (3,711 ft)
- Lowest elevation: 150 m (490 ft)

Population (2011)
  - Total: 4,260
  - Density: 16.2/km^{2} (41.9/sq mi)
- Time zone: UTC+00:00 (WET)
  - Summer (DST): UTC+01:00 (WEST)
- Postal code: 3330
- Area code: 235
- Website: http://www.cm-gois.pt

Góis (Portuguese pronunciation: [ˈɡɔjʃ]), officially the Town of Góis (Portuguese: Vila de Góis), is a municipality of the district of Coimbra, in the central part of continental Portugal. The population in 2011 was 4,260, in an area of 263.30 km².

== Geography ==
=== Physical geography ===
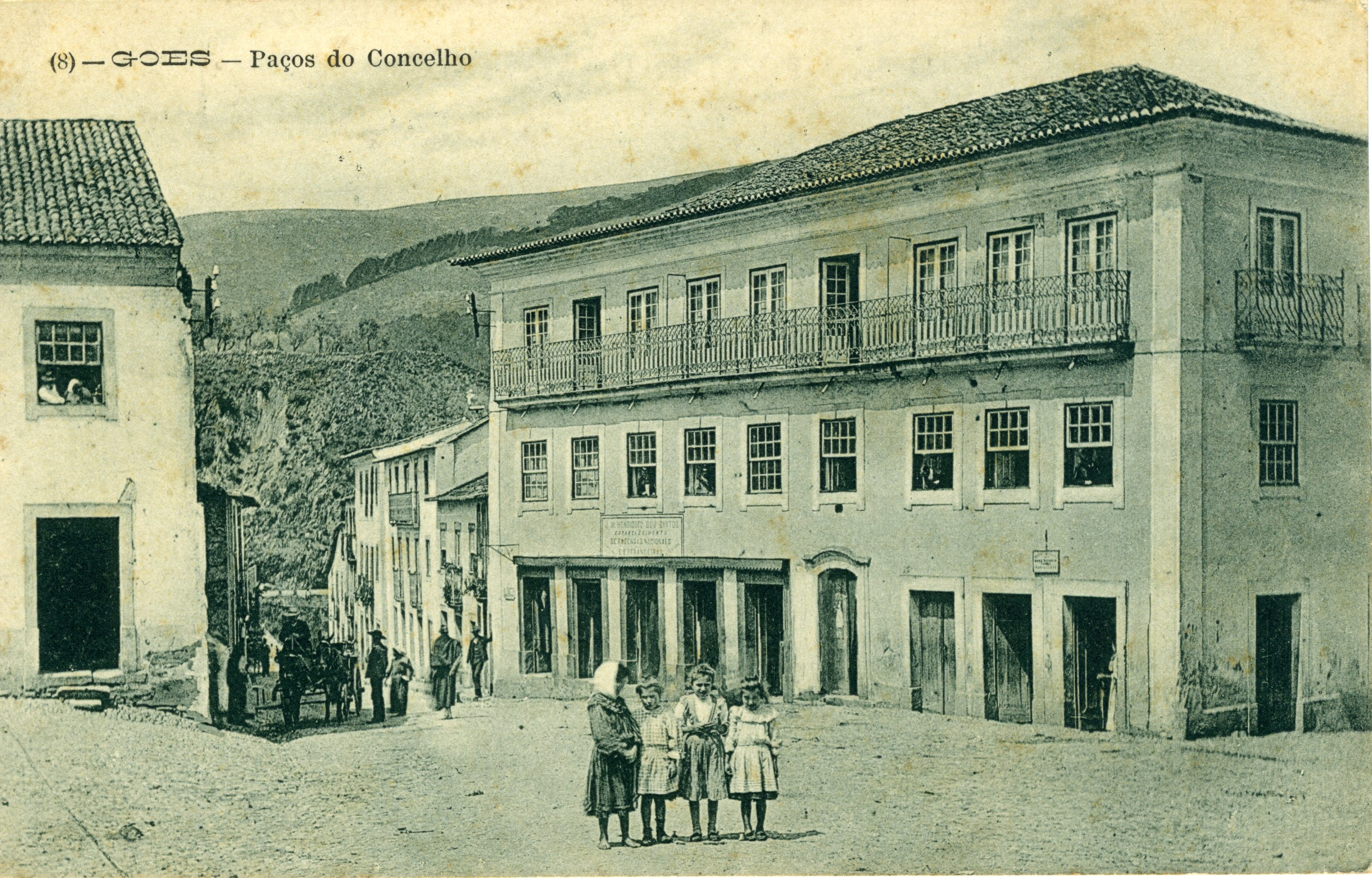
A (1910) photograph of the historical administrative buildings of the municipal seat

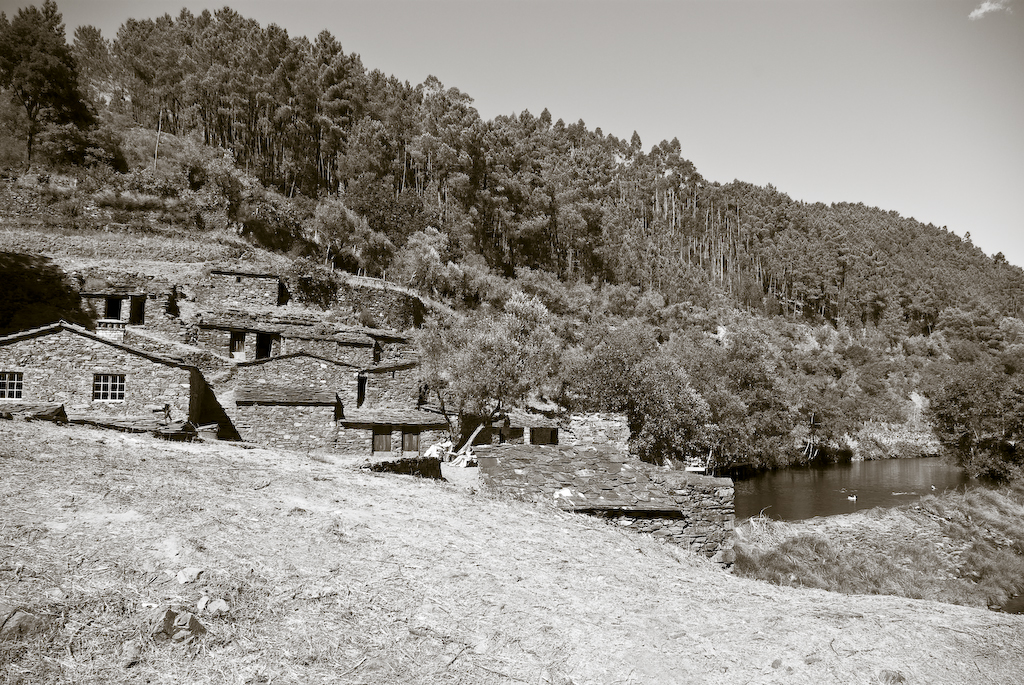
The rustic homes of the civil parish of Colmeal

The municipality of Góis is situated 40 kilometres (25 mi) in Coimbra, in the deep, narrow valley of the Ceira, between the mountains of Carvalhal and Rabadão. The municipality is limited in the north by the municipality of Arganil, east by Pampilhosa da Serra, southwest by Pedrógão Grande and Castanheira de Pera, west by Lousã and northwest by Vila Nova de Poiares.

The mountains of the Penedo de Góis, which are part of the Serra da Lousã (Lousã Mountains), at a height of 1,043 metres (3,422 ft), have an accentuated orography with many climatic differences; the Lousã represents the end of the southwest-central cordillera, with elevations between 800 metres (2,600 ft) and 1,200 metres (3,900 ft) above sea level, with accentuated slopes (resulting in steep cliffs that are mostly inaccessible) on the northern flanks and gentle in the south influenced by Atlantic and Mediterranean weather systems.

The environment resulted in a diverse vegetation, that includes holm oaks (Quercus rotundifolia) in the dry, sunny regions; and English oak (Quercus robur) and Pyrenean oak (Quercus pyrenaica) in the humid, colder areas. It is an area of appreciable landscape, composed of quartzite, accompanied by gravel along the flanks.

The rivers, in addition to its fishery resources, are utilized for leisure activities (including its beaches and fluvial pools).

There are a number of watercourses in the municipality, all with a permanent character that support the watersheds of the Zêzere and Mondego Rivers. The riparian vegetation, consequently, thrives: specifically, the patches of European alder (Alnus glutinosa) and communities of Portuguese laurel (Prunus lusitanica), with the presence of European holly (Ilex aquifolium). These areas include important spaces for the conservation of Iberian Emerald Lizard (Lacerta schreiberi) and particularly the Gold-Striped Salamander (Chioglossa lusitanica), also known as an area of elevated genetic diversity and major vulnerability.

=== Human geography ===
Population of Góis (1801 - 2011)
Year	Pop.	±%
1801	5,231	—
1849	6,332	+21.0%
1900	11,891	+87.8%
1930	12,230	+2.9%
1960	9,744	−20.3%
1981	6,434	−34.0%
1991	5,372	−16.5%
2001	4,861	−9.5%
2011	4,260	−12.4%

Administratively, the municipality is divided into 4 civil parishes (freguesias):

- Alvares
- Cadafaz e Colmeal
- Góis
- Vila Nova do Ceira

== Culture ==
There are many religious and/or secular festivals throughout the summer, including one of Portugal's largest Motorbikecompetitions in August (after the one in Faro).

== International relations ==
Góis is twinned with:

- São Paulo, Brazil
