= Col des Baudots =

Geographic location in France

Coordinates: 46.470°N 4.579°E

The Col des Baudots (420 m) is a pass near Marcilly-lès-Buxy in the department of Saône-et-Loire in east-central France. It is on route nationale 80 between Chalon-sur-Saône and Le Creusot. It is the continental divide between the watershed of the Saône, which drains to the Mediterranean Sea, and that of the Loire, which drains to the Atlantic Ocean.
