= Villeneuve-Saint-Nicolas =

- Part of Les Villages-Vovéens
- Location of Villeneuve-Saint-Nicolas
- Location within France Location within Centre-Val de Loire
- Coordinates: 48°17′19″N 1°34′00″E
- Country: France
- Region: Centre-Val de Loire
- Department: Eure-et-Loir
- Arrondissement: Chartres
- Canton: Voves
- Commune: Les Villages-Vovéens
- Area^{1}: 5.16 km^{2} (1.99 sq mi)
- Elevation: 150 m (490 ft)
- Highest elevation: 166 m (545 ft)
- Lowest elevation: 151 m (495 ft)
- Population (2023): 149
  - Density: 28.9/km^{2} (74.8/sq mi)
- Time zone: UTC+01:00 (CET)
  - Summer (DST): UTC+02:00 (CEST)
- Postal code: 28150
- ^{1} French Land Register data, which excludes lakes, ponds, glaciers > 1 km^{2} (0.386 sq mi or 247 acres) and river estuaries.

Villeneuve-Saint-Nicolas (French pronunciation: [vilnœv sɛ̃ nikɔla]) is a former commune in the Eure-et-Loir department in northern France. On 1 January 2016, it was merged into the new commune of Les Villages-Vovéens.

== See also ==
- Communes of the Eure-et-Loir department
