= Villeneuve-lès-Charnod =

- Part of Aromas
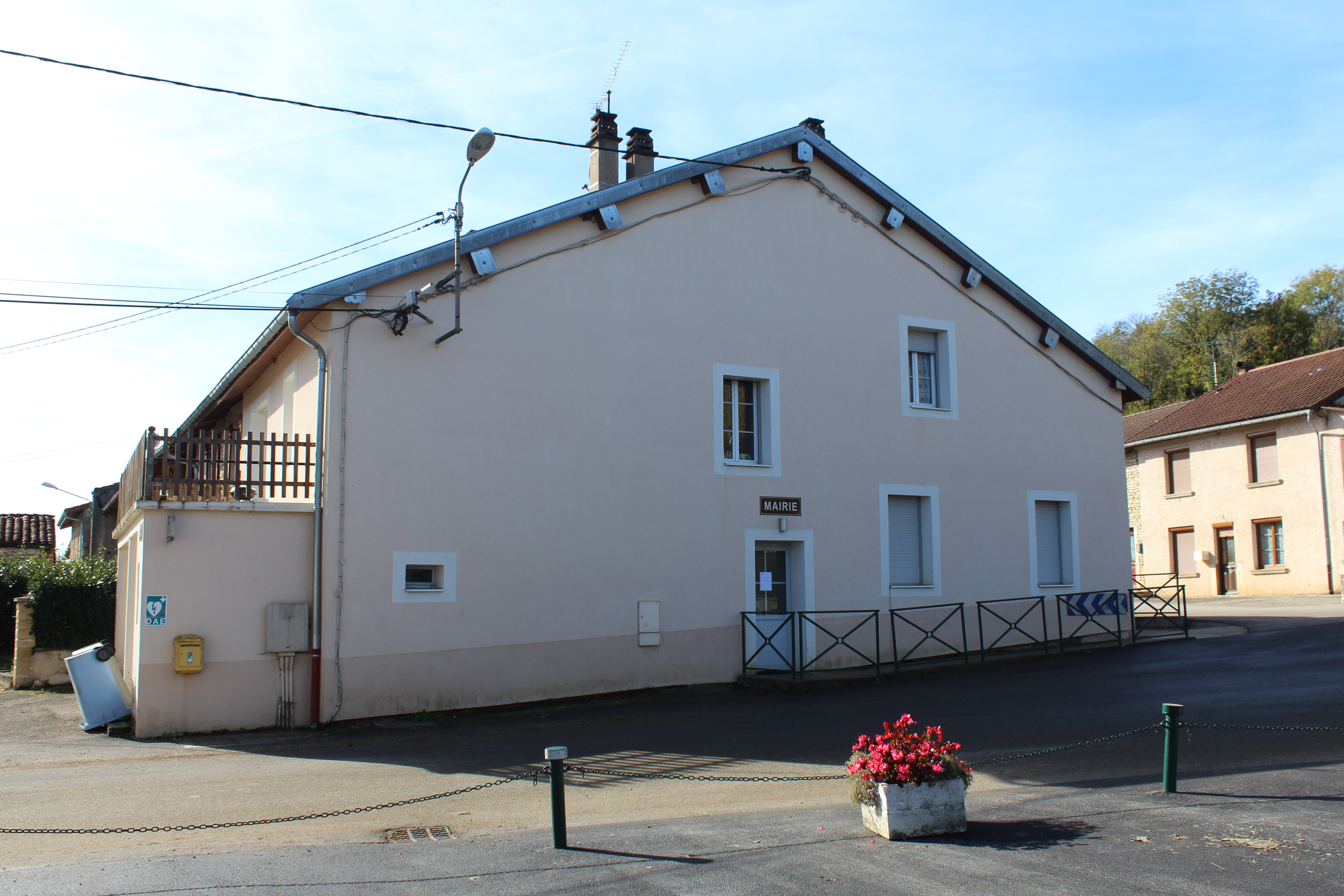
- Town hall
- Location of Villeneuve-lès-Charnod
- Location within France Location within Bourgogne-Franche-Comté
- Coordinates: 46°20′14″N 5°28′45″E
- Country: France
- Region: Bourgogne-Franche-Comté
- Department: Jura
- Arrondissement: Lons-le-Saunier
- Canton: Saint-Amour
- Commune: Aromas
- Area^{1}: 7.05 km^{2} (2.72 sq mi)
- Highest elevation: 641 m (2,103 ft)
- Lowest elevation: 419 m (1,375 ft)
- Population (2019): 85
  - Density: 12/km^{2} (31/sq mi)
- Time zone: UTC+01:00 (CET)
  - Summer (DST): UTC+02:00 (CEST)
- Postal code: 39240
- ^{1} French Land Register data, which excludes lakes, ponds, glaciers > 1 km^{2} (0.386 sq mi or 247 acres) and river estuaries.

Villeneuve-lès-Charnod (French pronunciation: [vilnœv lɛ ʃaʁno], literally Villeneuve near Charnod) is a former commune in the Jura department in the Bourgogne-Franche-Comté region in eastern France. On 1 January 2017, it was merged into the commune Aromas.

== See also ==
- Communes of the Jura department
