= Alvares (Góis) =

- Civil parish
- Location in Portugal
- Coordinates: 40.042°N 8.095°W
- Country: Portugal
- Region: Centro
- Intermunic. comm.: Região de Coimbra
- District: Coimbra
- Municipality: Góis

Area
  - Total: 100.57 km^{2} (38.83 sq mi)

Population (2011)
  - Total: 812
  - Density: 8.07/km^{2} (20.9/sq mi)
- Time zone: UTC+00:00 (WET)
  - Summer (DST): UTC+01:00 (WEST)

Alvares is a Portuguese parish in the municipality of Góis. The population in 2011 was 812, in an area of 100.57 km^{2} (38.83 sq mi).
