= Rochoso e Monte Margarida =

- Civil parish
- Location in Portugal
- Coordinates: 40.516°N 7.093°W
- Country: Portugal
- Region: Centro
- Intermunic. comm.: Beiras e Serra da Estrela
- District: Guarda
- Municipality: Guarda

Area
  - Total: 23.66 km^{2} (9.14 sq mi)

Population (2011)
  - Total: 300
  - Density: 13/km^{2} (33/sq mi)
- Time zone: UTC+00:00 (WET)
  - Summer (DST): UTC+01:00 (WEST)

Rochoso e Monte Margarida is a civil parish in the municipality of Guarda, Portugal. It was formed in 2013 by the merger of the former parishes Rochoso and Monte Margarida. The population in 2011 was 300, in an area of 23.66 km^{2}.
