= Villeneuve-lès-Bouloc =

- Commune
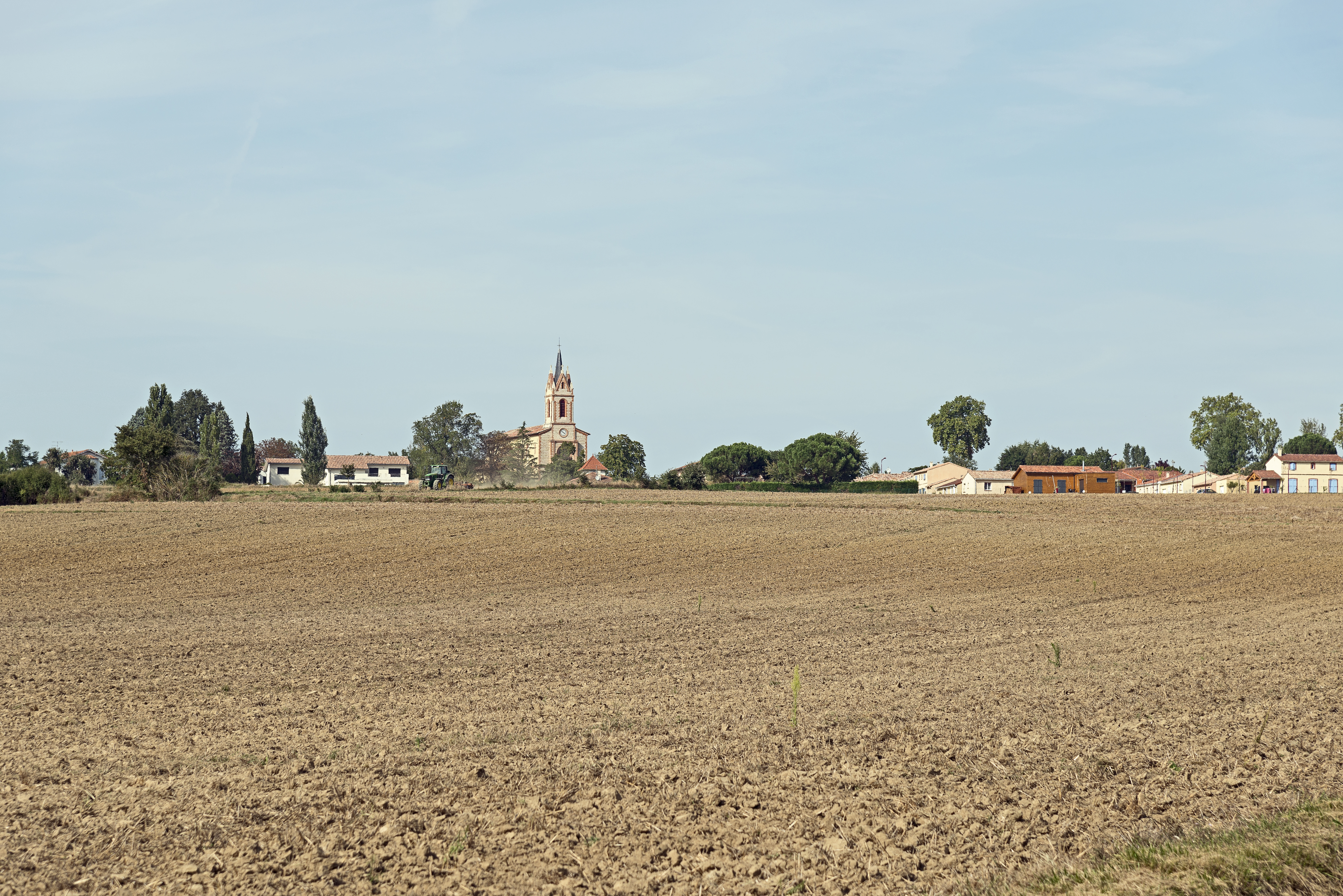
- A general view of Villeneuve-lès-Bouloc

- Coat of arms
- Location of Villeneuve-lès-Bouloc
- Location within France Location within Occitanie
- Coordinates: 43°46′13″N 1°25′39″E
- Country: France
- Region: Occitania
- Department: Haute-Garonne
- Arrondissement: Toulouse
- Canton: Villemur-sur-Tarn

Government
  - Mayor (2020–2026): André Gallinaro
- Area^{1}: 12.66 km^{2} (4.89 sq mi)
- Elevation: 152 m (499 ft)
- Highest elevation: 217 m (712 ft)
- Lowest elevation: 113 m (371 ft)
- Population (2023): 1,687
  - Density: 133.3/km^{2} (345.1/sq mi)
- Time zone: UTC+01:00 (CET)
  - Summer (DST): UTC+02:00 (CEST)
- INSEE/Postal code: 31587 /31620
- ^{1} French Land Register data, which excludes lakes, ponds, glaciers > 1 km^{2} (0.386 sq mi or 247 acres) and river estuaries.

Villeneuve-lès-Bouloc (French pronunciation: [vilnœv lɛ bulɔk], literally Villeneuve near Bouloc; Occitan: Vilanava de Bonlòc) is a commune in the Haute-Garonne department in southwestern France.

== Population ==
Historical population
Year	Pop.	±% p.a.
1968	429	—
1975	583	+4.48%
1982	699	+2.63%
1990	882	+2.95%
1999	950	+0.83%
2007	1,034	+1.06%
2012	1,136	+1.90%
2017	1,622	+7.38%
2023	1,687	+0.66%
Source: INSEE

== Sights ==
- The Château de Villefranche is a castle and stately home which is listed as a historic site by the French Ministry of Culture.
- The church
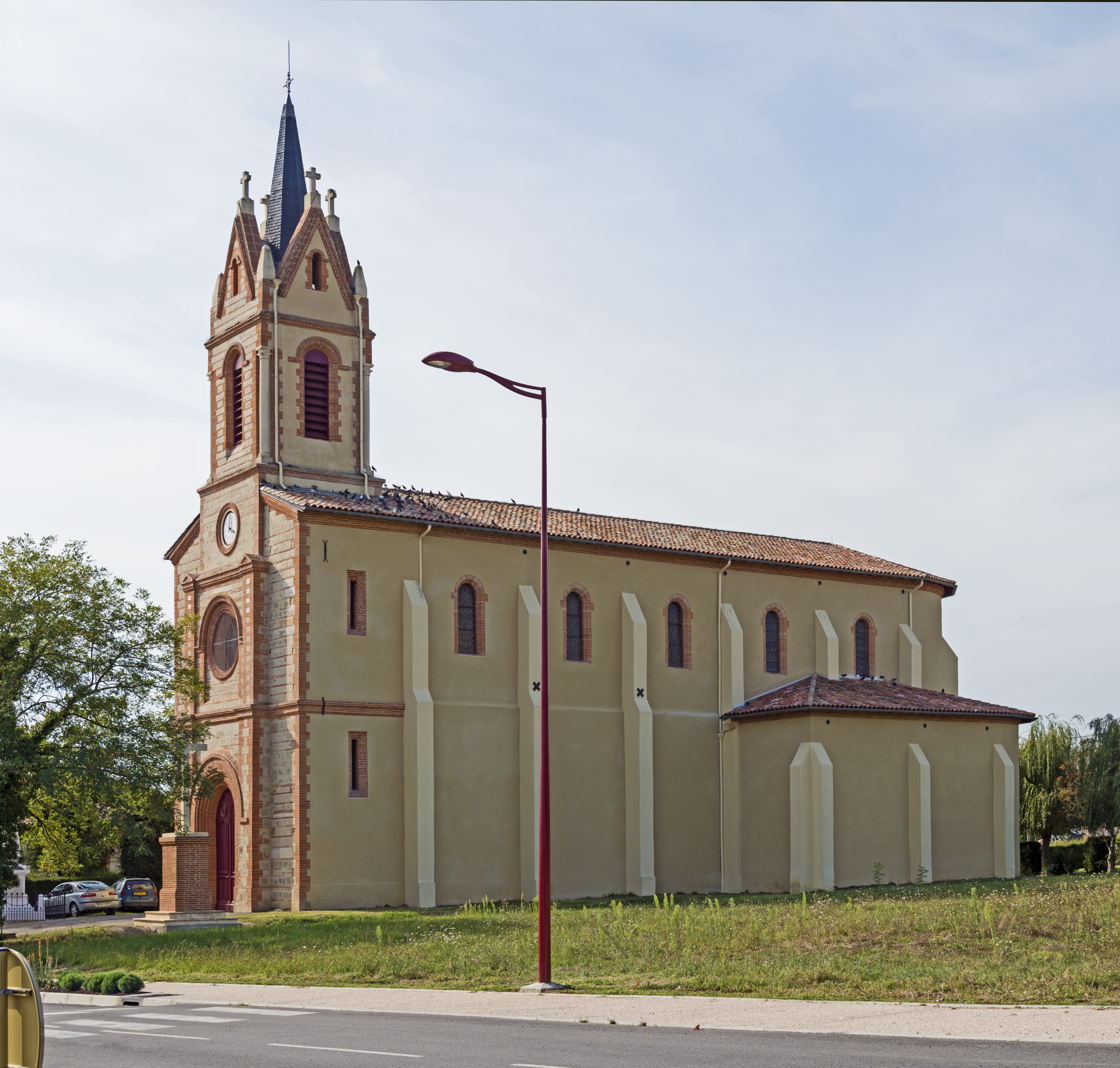

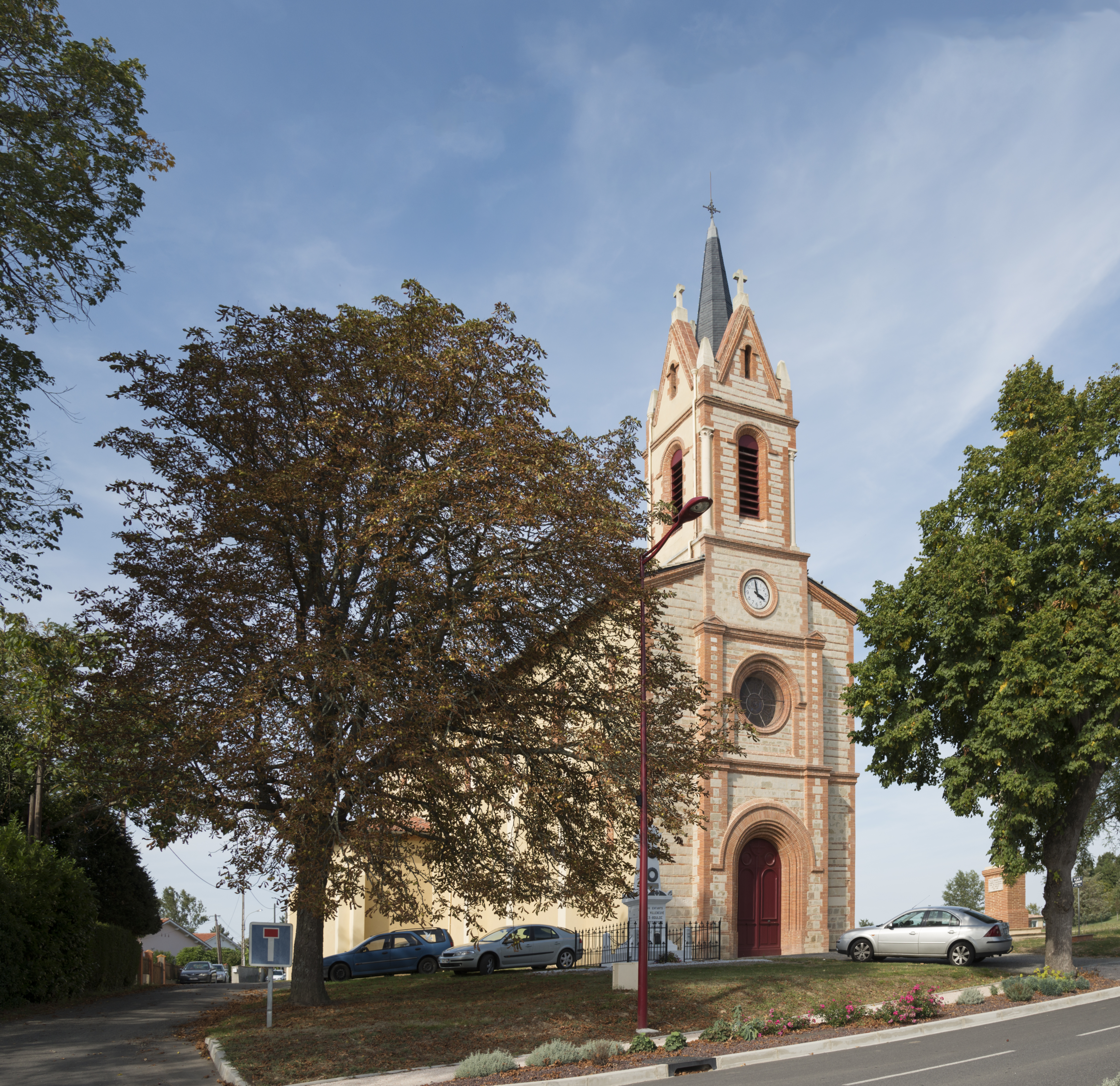

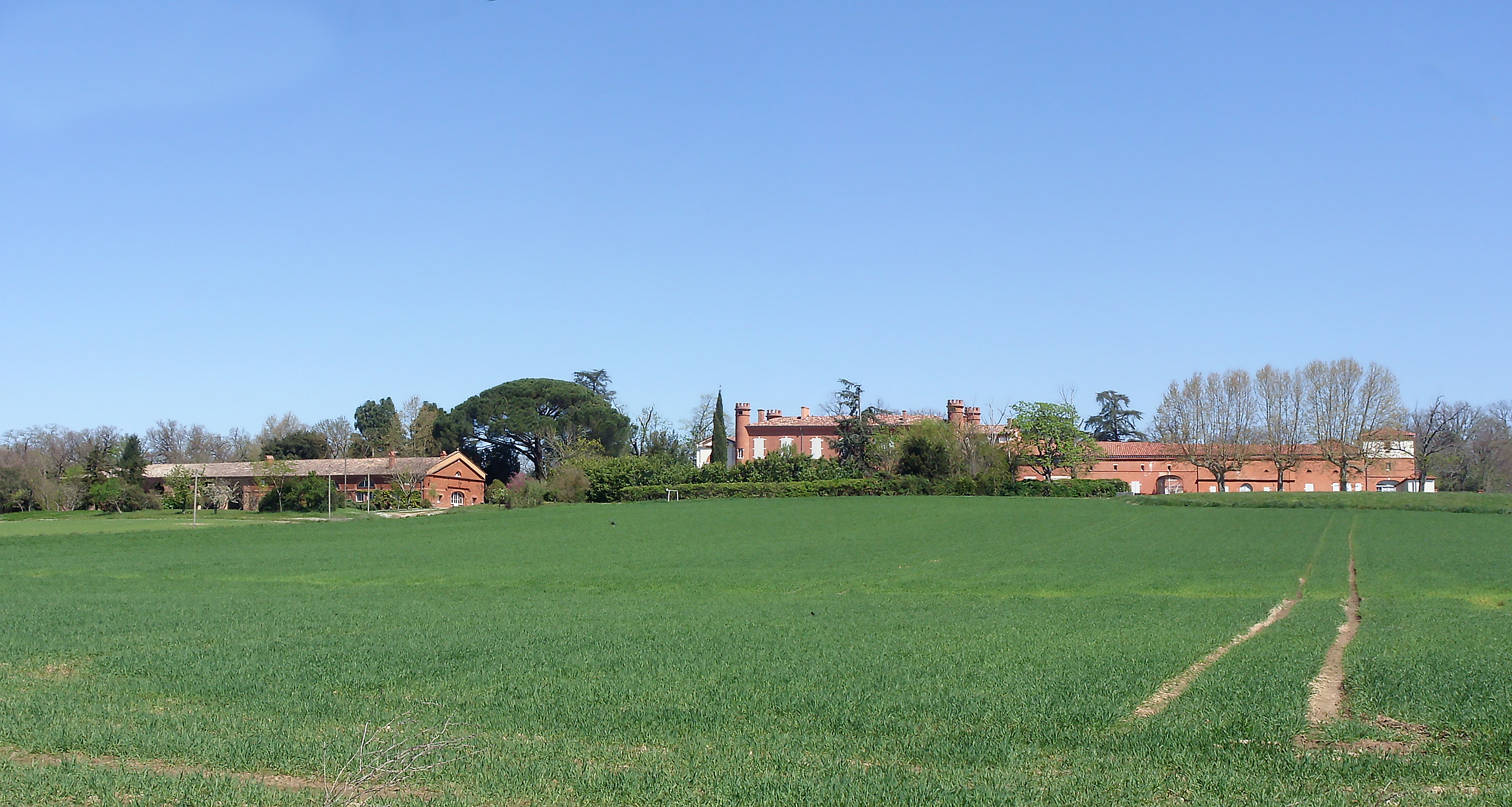

== See also ==
- Communes of the Haute-Garonne department
