= Góis (parish) =

- Civil parish
- Location in Portugal
- Coordinates: 40.156°N 8.110°W
- Country: Portugal
- Region: Centro
- Intermunic. comm.: Região de Coimbra
- District: Coimbra
- Municipality: Góis

Area
  - Total: 72.87 km^{2} (28.14 sq mi)

Population (2011)
  - Total: 2,171
  - Density: 29.79/km^{2} (77.16/sq mi)
- Time zone: UTC+00:00 (WET)
  - Summer (DST): UTC+01:00 (WEST)
- Website: http://freguesiadegois.pt/

Góis is a Portuguese freguesia ("civil parish") in the municipality of Góis. The population in 2011 was 2,171, in an area of 72.87 km^{2} (28.14 sq mi).
