= Villeneuve-Saint-Vistre-et-Villevotte =

- Commune
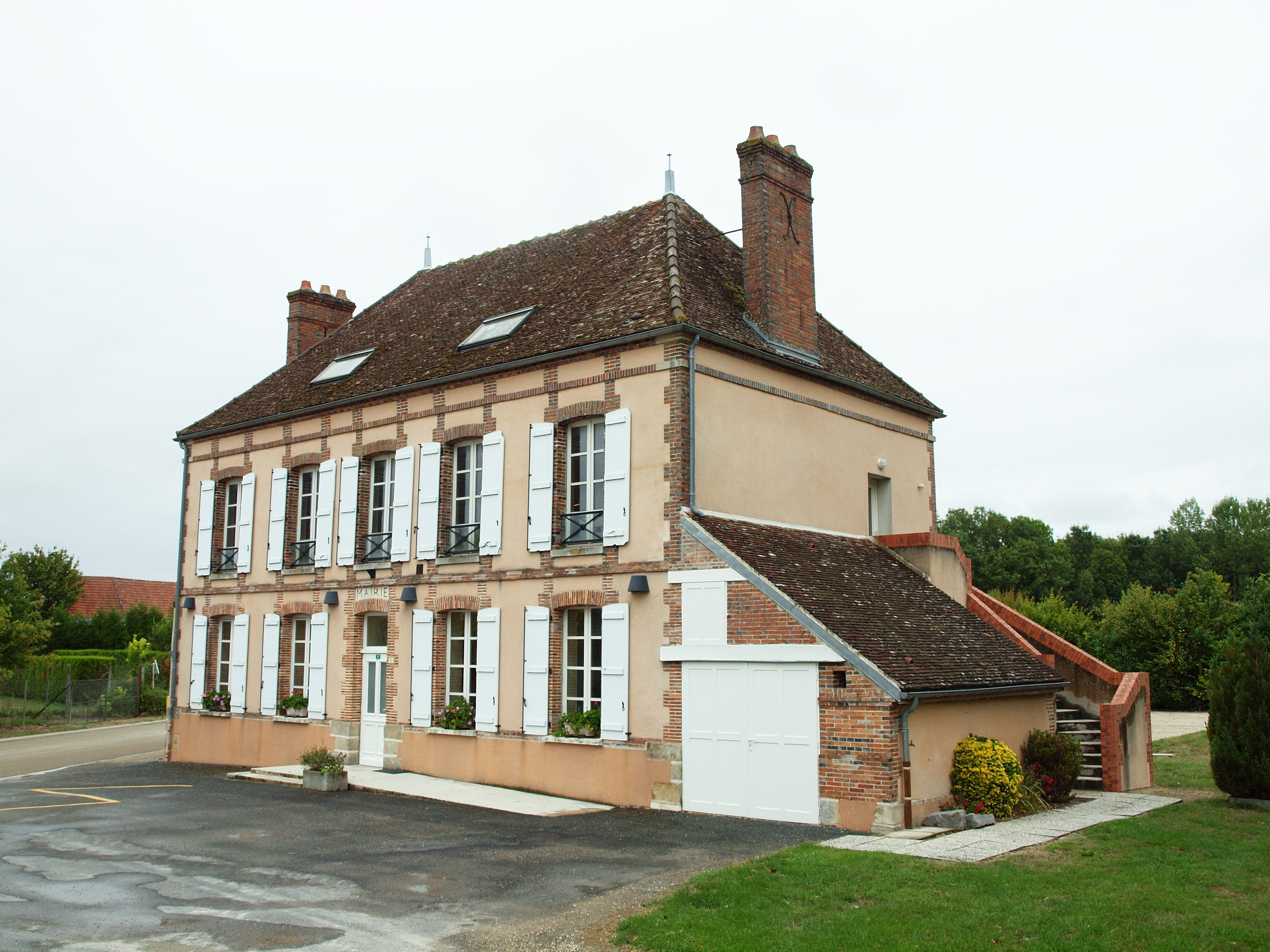
- The town hall in Villeneuve-Saint-Vistre-et-Villevotte
- Location of Villeneuve-Saint-Vistre-et-Villevotte
- Location within France Location within Grand Est
- Coordinates: 48°38′05″N 3°45′38″E
- Country: France
- Region: Grand Est
- Department: Marne
- Arrondissement: Épernay
- Canton: Sézanne-Brie et Champagne

Government
  - Mayor (2020–2026): William Noblet
- Area^{1}: 9.51 km^{2} (3.67 sq mi)
- Elevation: 89 m (292 ft)
- Population (2023): 120
  - Density: 13/km^{2} (33/sq mi)
- Time zone: UTC+01:00 (CET)
  - Summer (DST): UTC+02:00 (CEST)
- INSEE/Postal code: 51628 /51120
- ^{1} French Land Register data, which excludes lakes, ponds, glaciers > 1 km^{2} (0.386 sq mi or 247 acres) and river estuaries.

Villeneuve-Saint-Vistre-et-Villevotte (French pronunciation: [vilnœv sɛ̃ vistʁ e vilvɔt]) is a commune in the Marne department in north-eastern France.

== Gallery ==
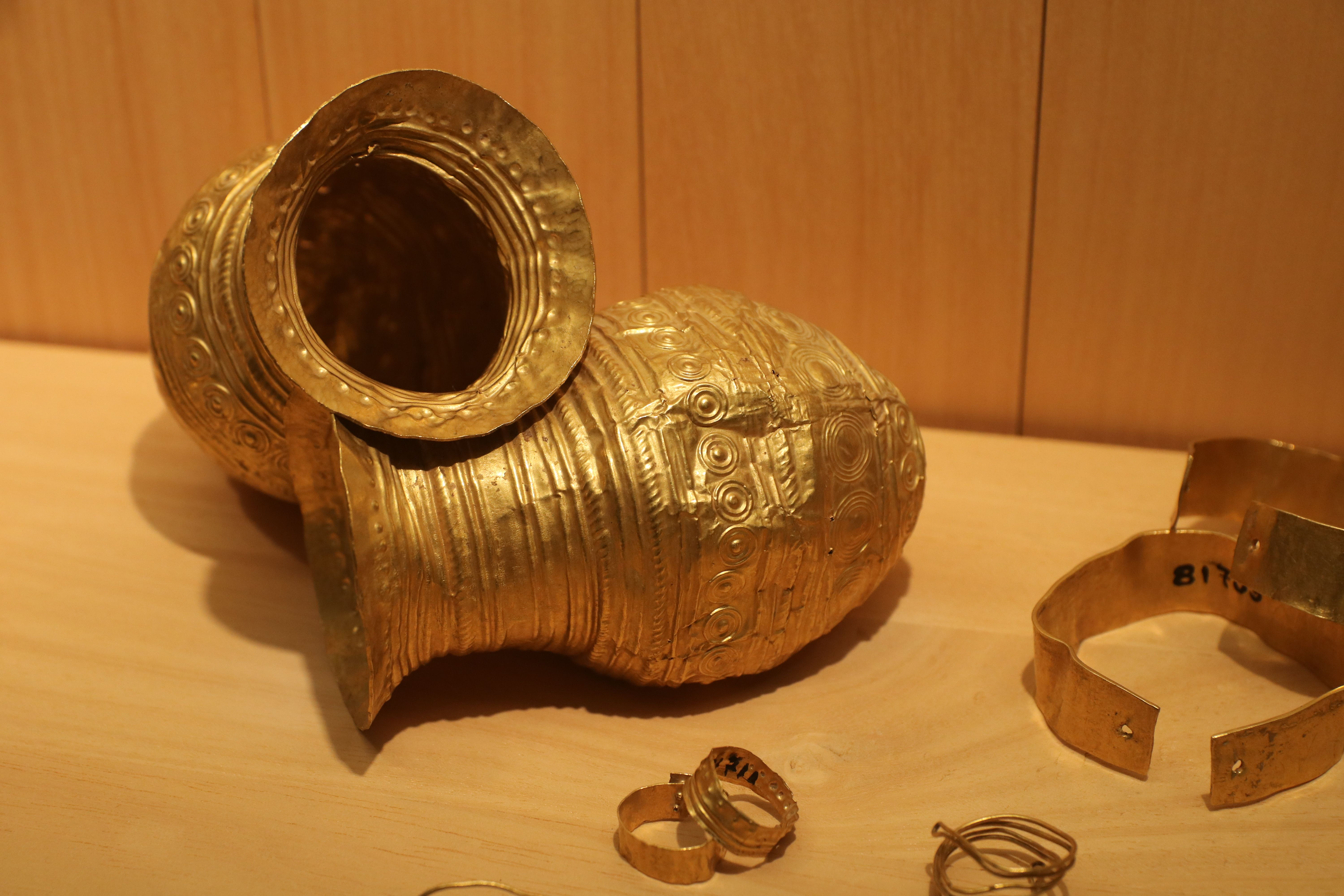
Bronze Age gold vessels found in Villeneuve-Saint-Vistre, Tumulus culture, c. 1400 BC

== See also ==
- Communes of the Marne department
