= Villa Nueva, Santiago del Estero =

Villa Nueva
- Locality
- Location within Santiago del Estero Province Location within Argentina
- Coordinates: 28°18′07″S 64°01′43″W
- Country: Argentina
- Province: Santiago del Estero
- Department: San Martín Department

Population (2010)
  - Total: 303
- Time zone: UTC−3 (ART)

Villa Nueva is a locality located in the San Martín Department in the Santiago del Estero Province in northern Argentina. It is located 500 meters from the Dulce River, and 4 km (2.5 mi) west of Provincial Route 18.

Unlike the other towns of 200-1000 inhabitants that exist in the province, Villa Nueva was not made from the train or from indiscriminate deforestation, but rather its settlement is due to the migration of the inhabitants of Villa Loreto, who settled on the eastern bank of the Dulce River after the flooding of the river washed away their original town.

The channel of the Dulce River tended to approach the town, for which in 2004 works were undertaken to bring the river to an old channel and build defenses for the town.
