= Montainville, Eure-et-Loir =

Montainville
- Part of Les Villages-Vovéens
- Location of Montainville
- Location within France Location within Centre-Val de Loire
- Coordinates: 48°16′17″N 1°32′42″E
- Country: France
- Region: Centre-Val de Loire
- Department: Eure-et-Loir
- Arrondissement: Chartres
- Canton: Voves
- Commune: Les Villages-Vovéens
- Area^{1}: 15.35 km^{2} (5.93 sq mi)
- Elevation: 158 m (518 ft)
- Highest elevation: 162 m (531 ft)
- Lowest elevation: 136 m (446 ft)
- Population (2023): 327
  - Density: 21.3/km^{2} (55.2/sq mi)
- Time zone: UTC+01:00 (CET)
  - Summer (DST): UTC+02:00 (CEST)
- Postal code: 28150
- ^{1} French Land Register data, which excludes lakes, ponds, glaciers > 1 km^{2} (0.386 sq mi or 247 acres) and river estuaries.

Montainville (French pronunciation: [mɔ̃tɛ̃vil]) is a former commune in the Eure-et-Loir department in northern France. On 1 January 2016, it was merged into the new commune of Les Villages-Vovéens.

== See also ==
- Communes of the Eure-et-Loir department
