= Vila Nova do Ceira =

- Civil parish
- Location in Portugal
- Coordinates: 40.181°N 8.149°W
- Country: Portugal
- Region: Centro
- Intermunic. comm.: Região de Coimbra
- District: Coimbra
- Municipality: Góis

Area
  - Total: 19.70 km^{2} (7.61 sq mi)

Population (2021)
  - Total: 931
  - Density: 47.3/km^{2} (122/sq mi)
- Time zone: UTC+00:00 (WET)
  - Summer (DST): UTC+01:00 (WEST)

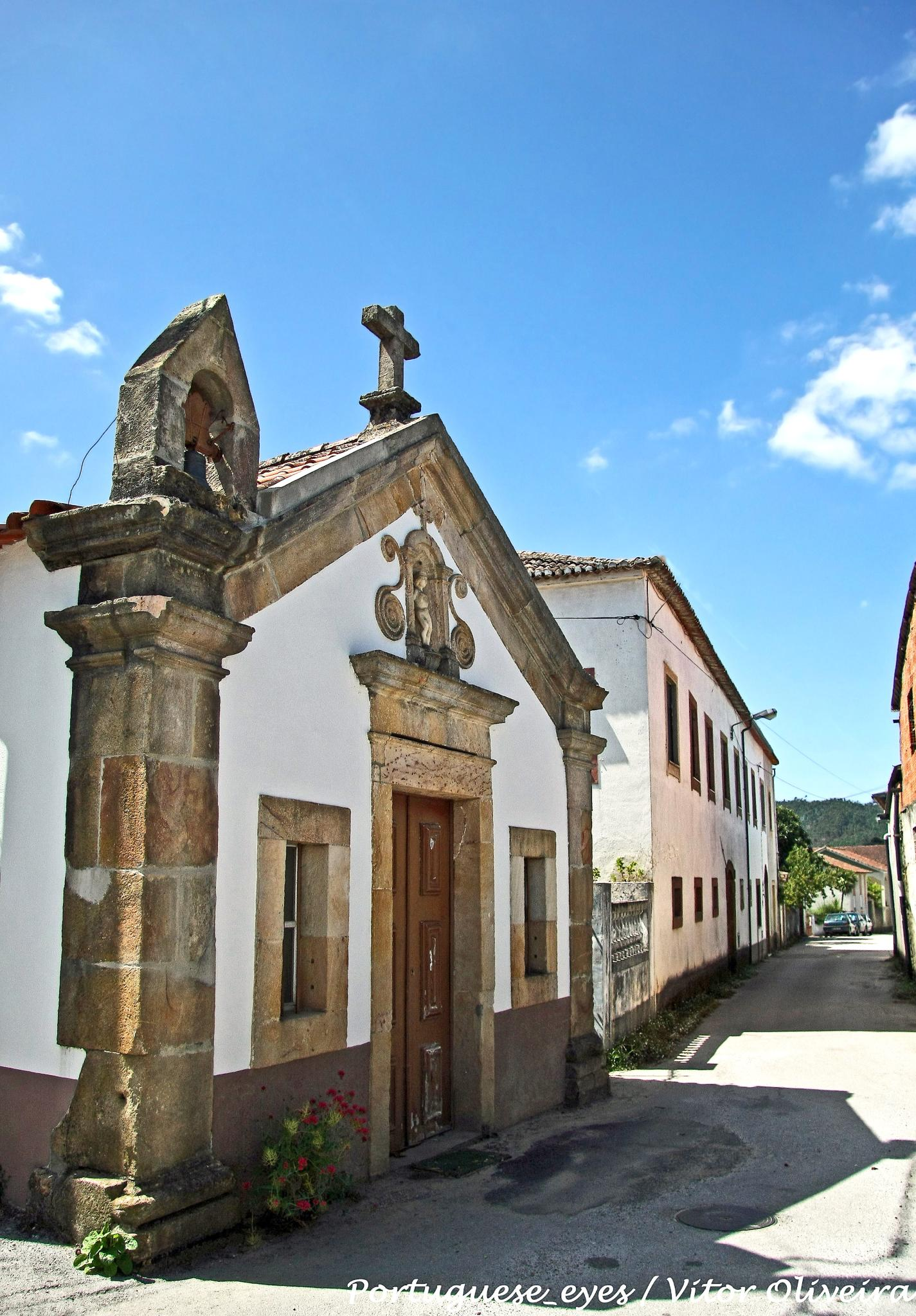
Capela do Mártir - Vila Nova do Ceira - Portugal

Vila Nova do Ceira is a Portuguese parish in the municipality of Góis. The population in the 2021 Census was 931, in an area of 19.70 km^{2} (7.61 sq mi).
