= Moimenta da Serra =

Coordinates: 40°28′26″N 7°37′55″W

Moimenta da Serra is a Portuguese town in the municipality of Gouveia, in the province of Beira Alta, in the Central Region and sub-region of Serra da Estrela, with an area of 6.47 km² and 652 inhabitants (2011). Density: 100.8 inhab/km².

It was the seat of an extinct freguesia in 2013, as part of a national administrative reform, to form, together with Vinhó, a new freguesia called União das Freguesias de Moimenta da Serra e Vinhó, of which it is the seat.

== Population ==
Population of the freguesia of Moimenta da Serra
1864	1878	1890	1900	1911	1920	1930	1940	1950	1960	1970	1981	1991	2001	2011
985	1 112	1 056	1 096	1 091	995	1 050	1 045	991	837	716	865	870	707	652
