= Bačka (disambiguation) =

Bačka is a historical region in Serbia and Hungary.

Bačka or Backa may also refer to:

- Bačka (Gora), a village near Dragaš, Kosovo
- Bačka, Slovakia, a village near Trebišov
- Eparchy of Bačka
- FK Bačka (disambiguation), Serbian football teams

== See also ==
- Backa
- Baca (disambiguation)
- Bača (disambiguation)
- Bacca (disambiguation)
