= Bacca (surname) =

Bacca is a surname. Notable people with the surname include:

- Ademir Antonio Bacca, Brazilian writer
- Carlos Bacca (born 1986), Colombian football player
- Estefanía Bacca, Argentine vedette
- Juan David García Bacca (1901–1992), Spanish-Venezuelan philosopher
- Pippa Bacca (1974–2008), Italian feminist artist
- Sonia Bacca, Italian physicist

== See also ==
- Baca (surname)
- Bača (surname)
