= Vestiaria, Portugal =

Vestiaria
- Parish
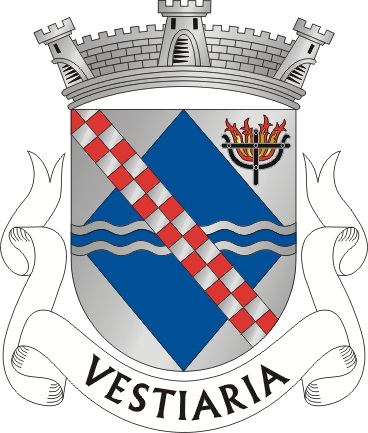
- Coat of arms
- Interactive map of Vestiaria
- Coordinates: 39°33′15″N 8°59′48″E
- Country: Portugal
- District: Leiria
- Municipality: Alcobaça

Area
  - Total: 631 km^{2} (244 sq mi)

Population (2011)
  - Total: 1 258
  - Density: 0.0016/km^{2} (0.0041/sq mi)
- Time zone: GMT+1
- Website: http://www.vestiaria.com/

Vestiaria is a freguesia ("civil parish") in the Alcobaça municipality, in Portugal, around 100 kilometres (62 mi) north of Lisbon.

== History ==
The region which includes the Vestiaria parish was successively inhabited by the Romans, the Alans, Suebi and Visigoths. Later, the region was occupied by Arabs for about 500 years, to be responsible to recover the prosperity that had been achieved by the Romans. At this time, the castle of Alcobaça was born (of Arab origin); however, when the conquest of Santarém from the Moors, the castle of Alcobaça along with the Alfeizerão, they were taken by D. Afonso Henriques in 1148, having received Alcobaça this monarch, a letter of Couto, giving it wide limits.

Therefore, and due to its geographical location on the village and monastery of Alcobaça, that is very close, it is assumed that Vestiaria has been inhabited since very ancient times; judging is, moreover, that Vestiaria suffered all events in Alcobaça, since the award of the letter of Couto to the population fixation, eventually benefit from these developments. According to the letter of Couto, the foundation of the Cistercian monastery of Santa Maria celebrate date of 1153, despite the land surveys carried out by the monks, probably originated from St. John of Tarouca, are earlier.

Although they conclude that human occupation in the territory is earlier than Portugal itself, it appears that in the twelfth century the town of Vestiaria if it was not barren, was at least sparsely populated, having suffered restocking by the Cistercians.

Its foundation is due, probably, to the construction of the Church which boasts the most beautiful Manueline doorway of the region.

Reportedly the abbot Jorge de Mello, the Alcobaça Monastery became an asylum for criminals and vagabonds. He wrote to the king Manuel I asking it to be created, far from the monastery, a place where they were transferred these individuals. The venue was the hill crest in front of the monastery, which was named village of St. Bernard, later called Vestiaria. Its original purpose, however, have never been fulfilled, having been transferred to São Martinho do Porto.

Vestiaria grew around its church, that undergone some changes over time.

According to some references the etymology of Vestiaria name derives from the fact that the population targeted to provide clothes, to the staff of the Monastery of Santa Maria de Alcobaça. Manuel Vieira Natividade wrote that it was at this location, previously Vestiairo, that They made the clothes for the monks of the Monastery. And so, or because then the clothes were made for the monks of the abbey, or because the income that the Cistercian monks obtained from that site were intended to garments, the name of Vestiaria is connected to the Monastery of Santa Maria de Alcobaça.

Today it is believed that the etymology of the word is most likely related to the fact that it existed on site at least one beam that would serve as a reference point for the boats that entered the sea between boiler Fervença, Maiorga, Valado de Frades and Alfeizerão.

The parish institution Vestiaria is documented and has occurred in the sixteenth century, the Monastery of Alcobaça.
