= Baca =

Baca or BACA may refer to:

== Places ==
- Baca, the appellation given by Josephus for the Galilean village of Peki'in
- Baca, Yucatán, seat of Baca Municipality, Mexico
- Baca County, Colorado
- Baca Municipality, Yucatán, Mexico
- Baca National Wildlife Refuge, Colorado
- Baça River, Portugal, which joins Alcoa River to form Alcobaça River (Portugal)
- Bakkah, also transliterated Baca, another name for Mecca, Saudi Arabia

== Other uses ==
- Baca (surname), including a list of people with the name
- Bikers Against Child Abuse (BACA)
- Brighton Aldridge Community Academy (BACA)
- Undecaprenyl-diphosphatase, an enzyme (BacA)

== See also ==
- Bača (disambiguation)
- Bacas (disambiguation)
- Bacca (disambiguation)
- Backa (disambiguation)
- De Baca County, New Mexico
- Luis Maria Baca Grant No. 4, New Mexico
