= Lisboa e Vale do Tejo =

Planning region of Portugal

Lisbon and Tagus Valley Lisboa e Vale do Tejo (Portuguese)
- Planning region and former NUTS-2 region
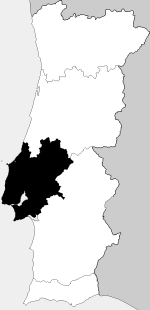
- Location, as per the old NUTS-1999 borders
- Coordinates: 38°43′N 9°9′W
- Country: Portugal
- NUTS I: Continental Portugal
- Districts: Lisbon, Santarém, Leiria (part), Setúbal (part)
- Historical provinces: Estremadura, Ribatejo (1936 map)
- Established: 11 March 1969
- NUTS-2 region: 5 May 1986
- End of NUTS-2 region: 5 November 2002
- CCDR: 23 May 2003
- Current borders: 1 January 2024
- Headquarters: Lisbon
- NUTS-2 regions Intermun. comm. Municipalities: 3; 5; 51

Government
  - Body: CCDR-LVT
  - President: Teresa Mourão de Almeida
  - President of the Regional Council: Frederico Rosa (PS, Barreiro)

Area
  - Total: 12,216 km^{2} (4,717 sq mi)
- Highest elevation (Pico de Aire [pt]): 678 m (2,224 ft)

Population (2021)
  - Total: 3,750,858
  - Density: 307.04/km^{2} (795.24/sq mi)
- Time zone: UTC+00:00 (WET)
  - Summer (DST): UTC+01:00 (WEST)
- Website: www.ccdr-lvt.pt

Lisbon and Tagus Valley (Portuguese: Lisboa e Vale do Tejo, European Portuguese pronunciation: [liʒˈβoɐ i ˈvalɨ ðu ˈtɛʒu]), often shortened to LVT, is a planning region of Portugal, administered by a Regional Development and Coordination Commission (CCDR) of the same name. Between 1986 and 2002 it was also one of the five continental NUTS II regions of Portugal.

Statistically, it is now divided between the regions of Oeste e Vale do Tejo, Greater Lisbon and the Setúbal Peninsula, being the only planning region not coterminous with a statistical counterpart. In 2021, it had a population of 3 750 858 residents in an area of 12 216 km^{2}, around 35% of the national population.

== History ==
The creation of state bodies with the objective of helping and coordinating development can be traced to the Portuguese Estado Novo, particularly in its final years. By 1959, the government had begun making "Development Plans" (Planos de Fomento) [pt], documents programming and detailing key investments in the country and its different regions. During the execution of the1965-67 intercalary plan, a Directorate of Planning Services with a regional planning division was created in 1966. Three years later in March 1969, in the midst of Caetano's "Marcellist Spring" (Primavera Marcelista) [pt] and in the context of the 1967-1973 development plan [pt], a decree created the Commissions of Regional Planning (CRP, Comissões Regionais de Planeamento). Directly under the Council Presidency, these new regional commissions mostly studied and elaborated plans and had a more of a consultation role rather than one of direct action. One of the six territorial units was the "Region of Lisbon". In this iteration, it consisted of the entirety of the districts of Lisbon, Setúbal and Santarém; with the first two being grouped as a "littoral sub-region" and the latter into a "interior sub-region". This is considered the official precursor of the modern entity.

The Carnation Revolution occurred in 1974 and as its predecessors, the government had discussions on how best to organize the country during the construction of the new Constitution, which would be approved exactly two years after the revolution in 1976. At the same time, with the revolution effectively voiding the IV Development Plan of 1974-79 [pt] approved just months before, the need to create a mechanism to continue to foster development was needed.

While a long-term solution wasn't in the works, a decree in January 1976 approved the hire of a workforce sought to help municipalities which in March 1979 would later be more consolidated as a concept and converted into the Technical Support Offices or GATs (Gabinetes de Apoio Técnico). While the legal text still refers to the old 1969 CRPs, the winds of change were already visible in the GAT territories which had been numbered and grouped under a letter, in Lisbon's case "C". On the 21 of December of the same year, a separate decree instituted the new Regional Coordination Commissions (CCR - Comissões de Coordenação Regional), creating the CCR of Lisbon and Tagus Valley. Its area of action had changed however, basing itself on the distribution of GATs a few months prior, rather than the districts themselves - the historical Alentejo part of the Setúbal district was moved to the new CCR Alentejo whilst the majority of the Castelo Branco district (with the exception of the municipalities of Belmonte, Covilhã and Fundão) was now included in the "LVT" region. This territory was divided into ten operating cabinets, based in Leiria, Caldas da Rainha, Torres Vedras, Tomar, Torres Novas, Santarém, Salvaterra de Magos, Sertã, Abrantes and Castelo Branco.

A situation developing parallel to this would be the fact that in 1977 Portugal had initiated the process to join the European Economic Community (EEC) and would do so on the 1 January 1986. From this, one of the many european frameworks needing to be created were regional statistical units for the process of the common statistic platform and more importantly the application of European funds going forward. This regional map of NUTS was approved in May by a resolution of the council of ministers of the X Constitutional Government, which at this time was also altering the organizational structure of regional planning. "Lisboa e Vale do Tejo" would therefore be a NUTS II unit, overseeing five NUTS III sub-regions, similar to those today - Greater Lisbon-North (mostly equivalent to today's Greater Lisbon, renamed from 1989), Greater Lisbon-South (equivalent to the Setúbal Peninsula, renamed from 1989), Lezíria do Tejo, Médio Tejo and Oeste. Despite having familiar names, some of the borders appear differently than those today - Golegã and Chamusca were a part of Médio Tejo and beside this, Ponte de Sor and Gavião were a part of the same sub-region, due to historical and geographical ties. Interestingly despite being within the area drawn for Lezíria do Tejo in the accompanying figure, the legal text by lapse makes no mention of Azambuja in its list.

1989 would pose itself as yet another change in the paradigm with the alteration of the CCR organization scheme and simultaneously to its borders in tandem with the NUTS-1989 map - Médio Tejo would be the most affected as Golegã and Chamusca remained within LVT but moved to Lezíria do Tejo, Ponte de Sor would move to the Alentejo region as part of the Alto Alentejo sub-region and Mação would integrate the Central region as part of the Southern Interior Pinewood sub-region. Another relevant note in this diploma would be the creation of the agrarian regions of Portugal [pt] which, while not under the CCR, was coterminous to it as "Ribatejo e Oeste" with ten subdivisions called "zones".

The 1990s would compartively be a more stable period for regional commissions albeit not uneventful. Toward the end of the decade, the discussion on regionalization had reappeared causing the 1998 referendum. The 1976 constitution had foreseen the creation of administrative regions in its chapter IV of Title VIII with the existing districts functioning in the meantime, but this had so far not been enacted and had led to considerable discussion. The 1998 proposal as approved in April, would have attempted to create a transition from the districts with the territory under Lisbon and Tagus Valley split under two new regions with differing borders from the CCR - "Lisbon and Setúbal" consisting of the Lisbon district and Setúbal Peninsula, as well as "Estremadura and Ribatejo" consisting of the districts of Leiria and Santarém, named after the two historical regions despite not really being consistent with their borders. This would only exist in a piece of legislation from April 1998 as come November the country would reject the proposal, with the latter having one of the three highest rejection rates.

The following year marked the end of Europe's Multiannual Financial Framework for 1994-99 and would therefore allow another chance for the country to redraw its NUTS map. The publication of the NUTS-1999 map in May was fairly uneventful with initially only the confirmation of Odivelas, which had recently been separated from Loures, as part of Greater Lisbon. A few months later in August 1999, an alteration was approved moving Gavião from Lisbon and Tagus Valley to its traditional region of Alentejo within Alto Alentejo, where it is the only municipality north of the Tagus.

In 2002, the map was redrawn and the region ceased to be used for statistical purposes, being split in three at the NUTS II level for better funding access - the Lisbon region (renamed Lisbon metropolitan area in the NUTS-2013 map) consisting of Greater Lisbon and the Setúbal Peninsula, the Central Region took Oeste and Médio Tejo under its wing and Lezíria do Tejo was given to the Alentejo. This would not be the end of Lisbon and the Tagus Valley however, as it continued to serve as a CCR to this entire space, although its borders would change along with the NUTS, or, intermunicipal communities map - this would also mean that for the first two decades of the 21st century, the Centro and Alentejo CCDRs would not be coterminous with the NUTS space because of this arrangement.

In the following year, 2003, the XV Government, chiefed by Durão Barroso, would approve changes to the commissions' framework in order to create the Regional Development and Coordination Commissions (CCDRs - Comissões de Coordenação e Desenvolvimento Regional) as we now know them today.

== Geography ==
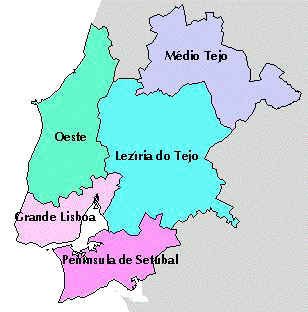
Subdivisions of Lisbon and Tagus Valley under the NUTS-1989 version of borders.

=== Subdivisions ===
The region of Lisbon and Tagus Valley is composed of territory from the districts of Lisbon and Santarém in its entirety and parts of Leiria and Setúbal; effectively almost the historical provinces of Estremadura and Ribatejo. For internal administrative purposes, the region of Lisbon and Tagus Valley is divided into two subdivisions in order to tend to two different territorial realities - Oeste e Vale do Tejo (OVT) to the north and the Lisbon Metropolitan Area (AML) to the south.

In terms of NUTS subdivisions, as of the current 2024 reorganization of statistical units is within three NUTS II or "regions" and within five NUTS III or "sub-regions" which directly translate into intermunicipal communities (CIM), within which there are 51 municipalities (and 525 civil parishes):

- Greater Lisbon
  - Greater Lisbon (simultaneous NUTS II and III unit)
    - Amadora, Cascais, Lisbon, Loures, Mafra, Odivelas, Oeiras, Sintra and Vila Franca de Xira
- Oeste e Vale do Tejo
  - Lezíria do Tejo
    - Almeirim, Alpiarça, Azambuja, Benavente, Cartaxo, Chamusca, Coruche, Golegã, Rio Maior, Salvaterra de Magos and Santarém
  - Médio Tejo
    - Abrantes, Alcanena, Constância, Entroncamento, Ferreira do Zêzere, Mação, Ourém, Sardoal, Tomar, Torres Novas and Vila Nova da Barquinha
  - Oeste
    - Alcobaça, Alenquer, Arruda dos Vinhos, Bombarral, Cadaval, Caldas da Rainha, Lourinhã, Nazaré, Óbidos, Peniche, Sobral do Monte Agraço and Torres Vedras
- Setúbal Peninsula
  - Setúbal Peninsula (simultaneous NUTS II and III unit)
    - Alcochete, Almada, Barreiro, Moita, Montijo, Palmela, Seixal, Sesimbra and Setúbal

Greater Lisbon and the Setúbal Peninsula are still united within the Lisbon metropolitan area as a policy making organism, despite it losing its NUTS II status. Due to the recency of the NUTS-2024 reorganization the intermunicipal community structure in both is still being created as it did not exist previously, although this will not nullify the strategic importance of a common decision platform like the metropolitan area. On the 16 December 2025, the Setúbal Peninsula intermunicipal community was officially instituted in Setúbal. Although the central government intends that Greater Lisbon also have a community, steps for this to take place as of July 2026 have so far locally not been taken.

== Administration ==
As previously stated, the Lisbon and Tagus Valley region is overseen by a CCDR or Regional Development and Coordination Commission, called CCDR Lisboa e Vale do Tejo. Its headquarters are in central Lisbon, Rua Alexandre Herculano, 37, in the western half of the street near its crossing with Rua Braamcamp.

For planning purposes, rather than having a unified regional territorial ordinance plan/programme (PROT, Plano, now Programa Regional de Ordenamento do Território), the two respective subdivisions each have their own. Currently, the Lisbon metropolitan area is the only territory in the country without an approved regional programme.

=== Presidents of the CCDR ===
1. José Palma Andrés (May 1970 - June 1986)
2. Casimiro António Pires (June 1986 - June 1988)
3. António Rebordão Montalvo (July 1988 - October 1990)
4. José Salter Cid (November 1990 - October 1993)
5. Teresa Zambujo [pt] (October 1993 - February 1995)
6. Maria de Lurdes Carrola (May 1995 - April 1996)
7. Maria Irene Veloso (April 1996 - November 1997) [AR bio]
8. António Fonseca Ferreira (March 1998 - August 2009)
9. Luísa Leitão do Vale (September 2009 - February 2010)
10. Teresa Mourão de Almeida (February 2010 - February 2012)
11. Eduardo Brito Henriques (February 2012 - May 2014)
12. João Pereira Teixeira (March 2014 - May 2019)
13. Teresa Mourão de Almeida (July 2019 - present)
