= São Martinho do Porto =

- Civil parish
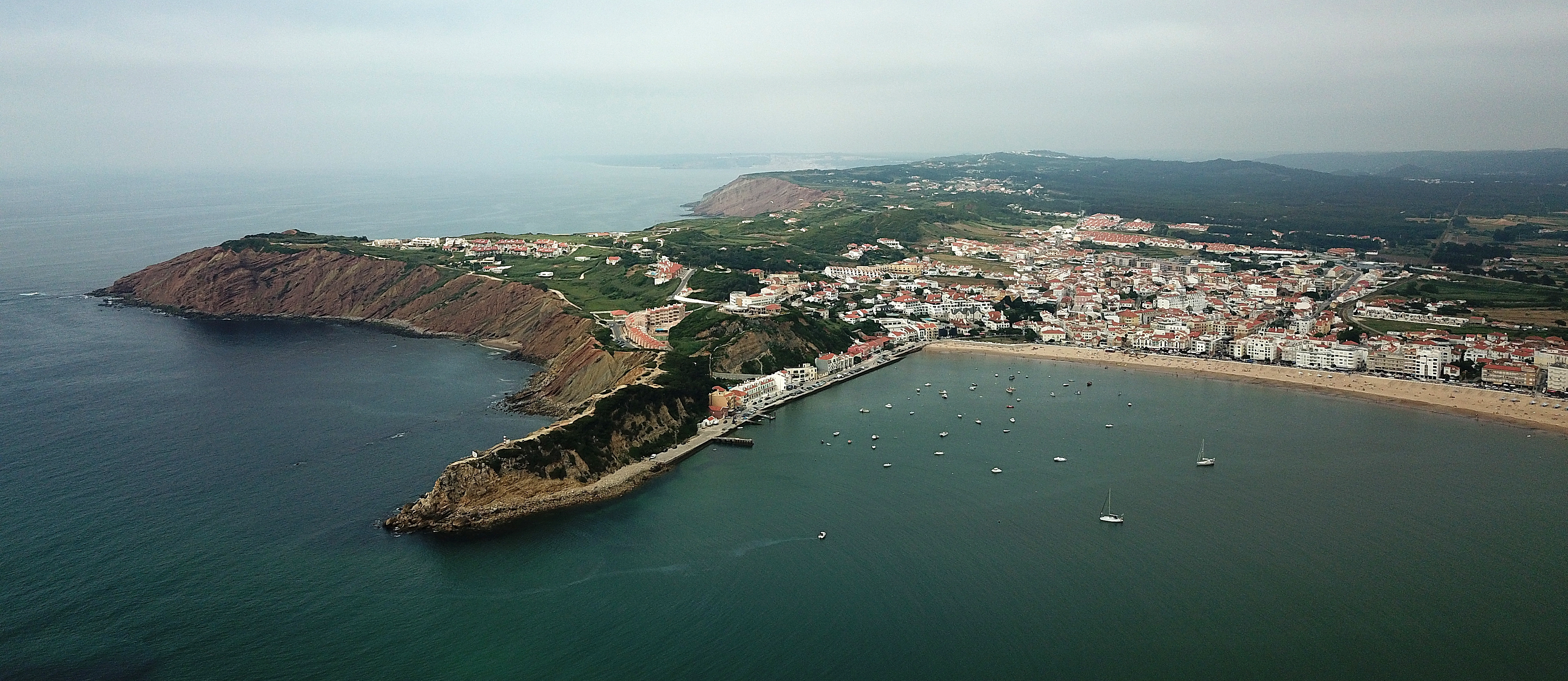

- Location in Portugal
- Coordinates: 39.513°N 9.134°W
- Country: Portugal
- Region: Oeste e Vale do Tejo
- Intermunic. comm.: Oeste
- District: Leiria
- Municipality: Alcobaça

Area
  - Total: 14.64 km^{2} (5.65 sq mi)

Population (2011)
  - Total: 2,868
  - Density: 195.9/km^{2} (507.4/sq mi)
- Time zone: UTC+00:00 (WET)
  - Summer (DST): UTC+01:00 (WEST)

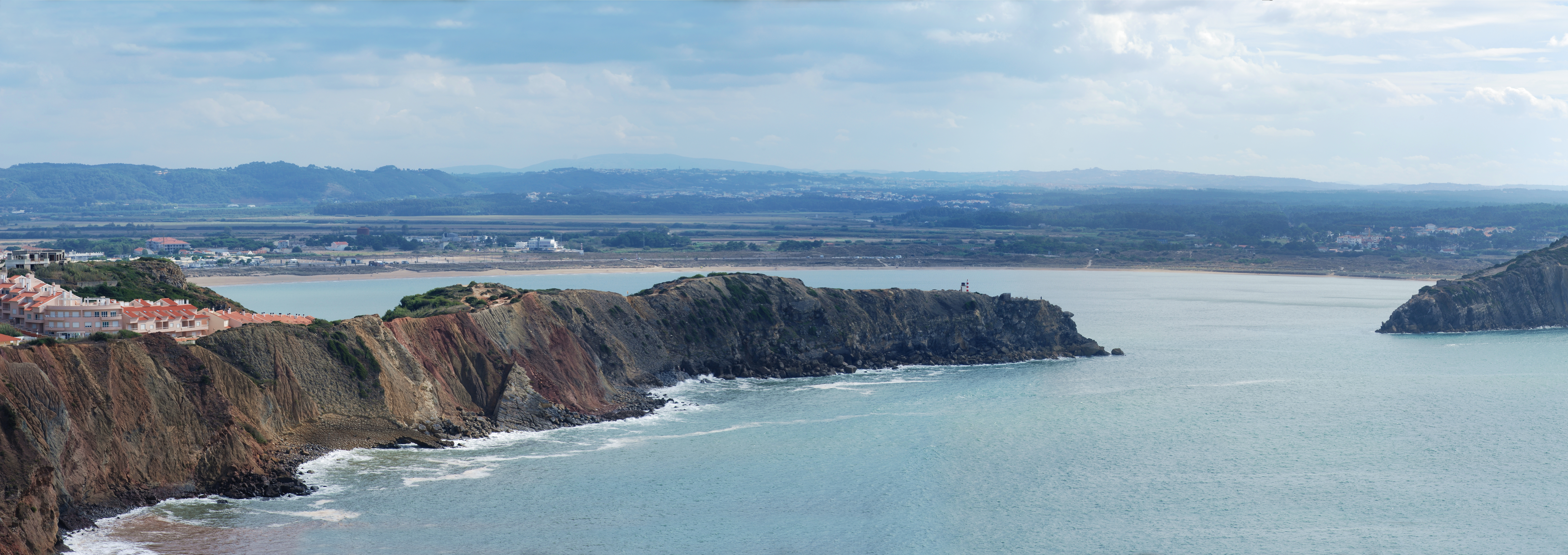
The entrance of the bay, viewed from the North

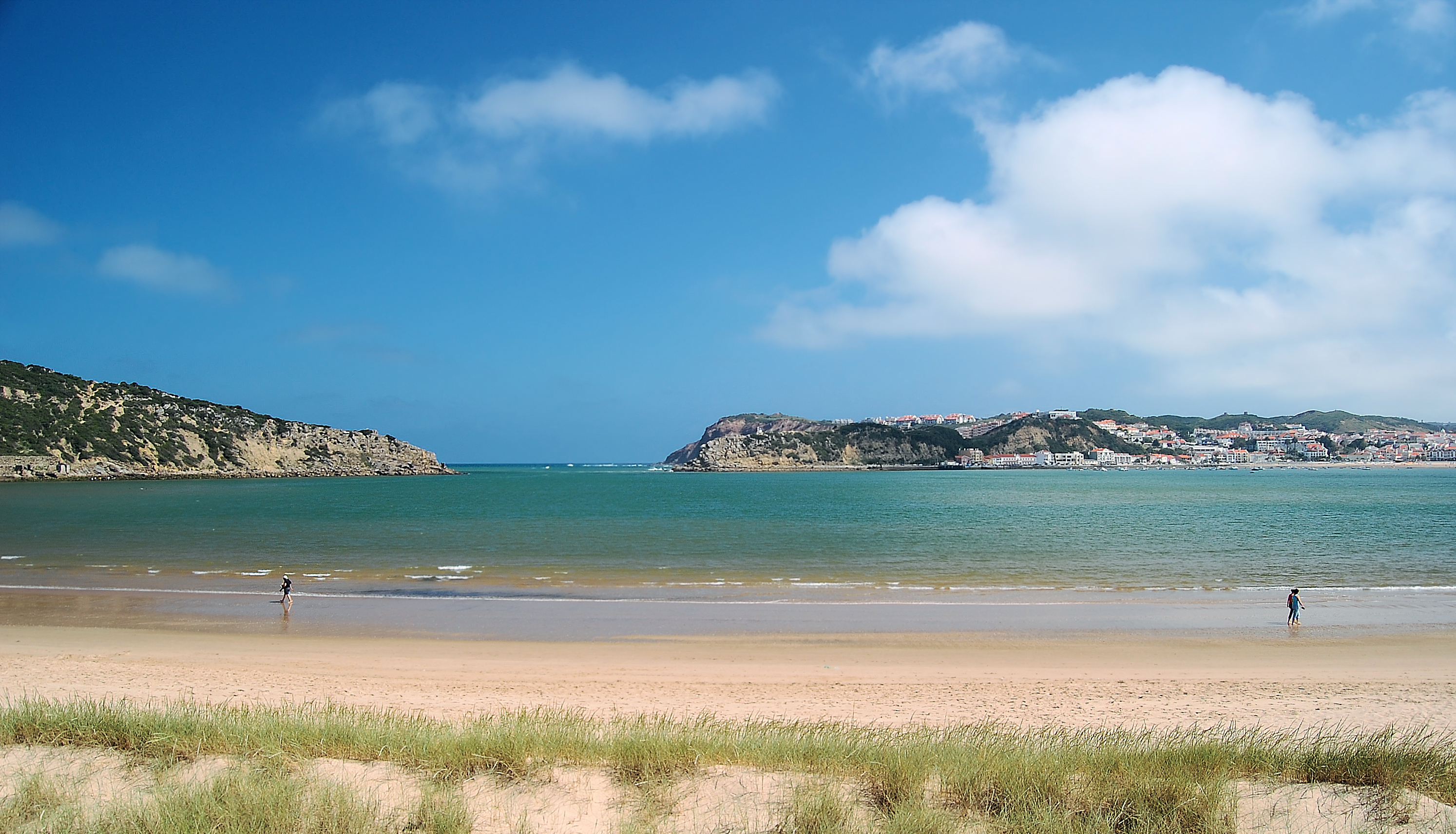
Bay of São Martinho do Porto.

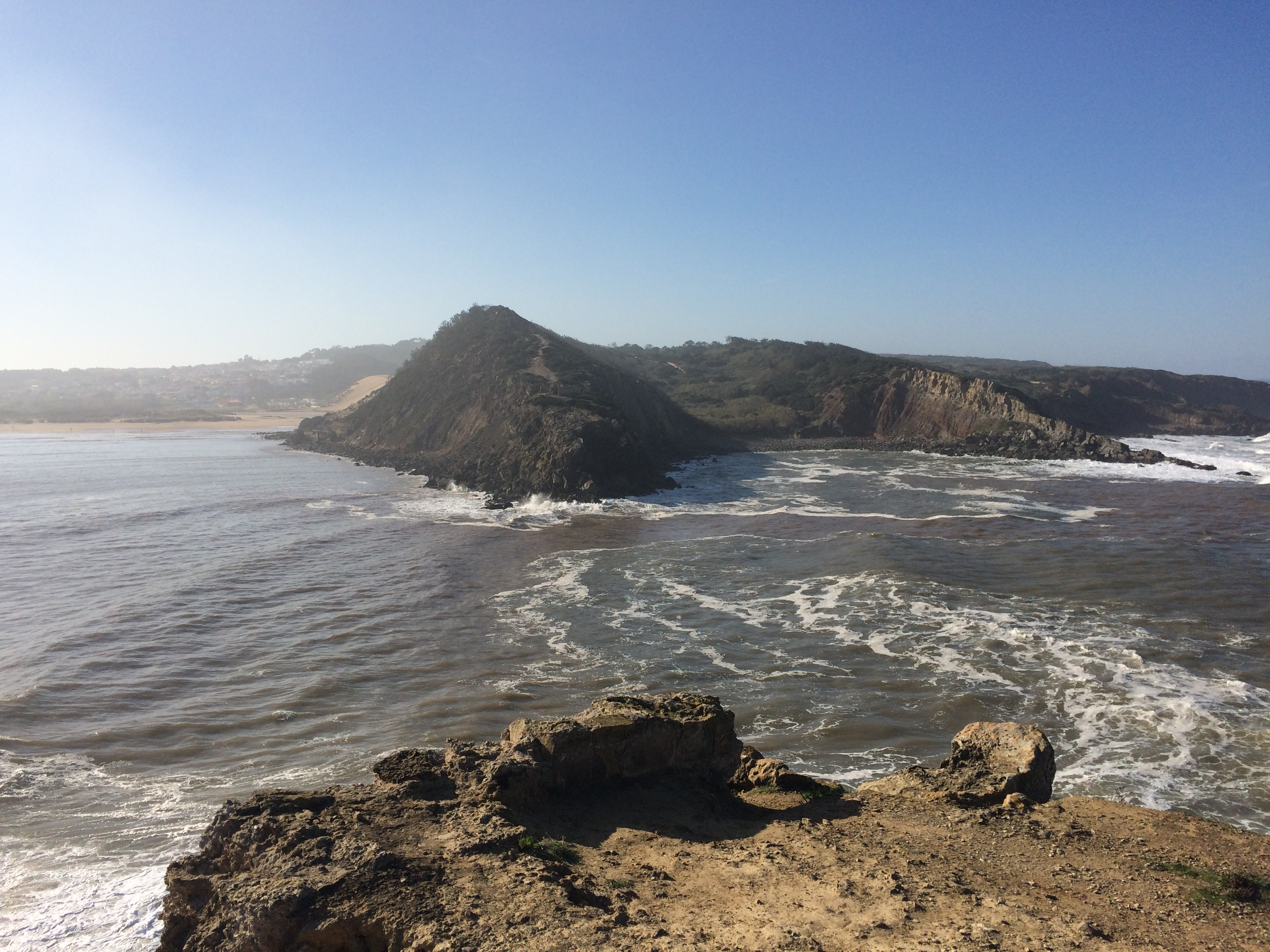
Bay entrance up close

São Martinho do Porto is a civil parish in Alcobaça Municipality and in the Oeste region of Portugal. The population in 2011 was 2,868, in an area of 14.64 km^{2}. It was a town and county seat until 1855.

== History ==
The region constituted by the Serra da Pescaria and by the Bouro mountain constituted, in geological times, a single island. When it was divided it gave rise to the bay of São Martinho do Porto.

In historical times, the village was mentioned for the first time in a letter passed in 1257 by Friar Estevão Martins, 12th abbot of the Monastery of Alcobaça. The bay was the sea port of Alcobaça, where activities related to fishing and shipbuilding were developed. In 1801 it had 932 inhabitants. In 1839 the parishes of Alfeizerão, Salir do Porto and Serra do Bouro were annexed. In 1849 in had 3596 inhabitants.

Given the local development and the construction of the pier, already around 1885 the neighborhood of the beach came to remember a second village.

It was constituted has a seaside resort frequented by the nobility and the bourgeoisie since the end of the 19th century, becoming known as the "bidet of the marquees".

Currently the village is constituted by two distinct nuclei:

- The lower part, near the beach, directed for the tourist activity;
- The upper part, where the traditional dwellings and the Mother Church reside;

== Visitor attractions ==
The parish has one of the most beautiful beaches in Portugal, a bay shaped like a scallop with calm waters and fine white sand. According to the travel booking site eDreams, the "natural bay of clear and calm water and surrounded by diverse shops and restaurants offers the ideal conditions for a relaxed family day" and São Martinho do Porto is "perfect for the baths of children, while adults relax in the sand or have a drink on a terrace overlooking the sea".

Although the commercial importance of the port has diminished, its tourist activity is dynamic during the summer season.

The bay is only connected to the sea by an opening only a few meters wide, so the waters are quiet, great for children and better still for competitions of sailing, windsurfing or kayaking. The road by the sea, where parking is difficult, has numerous cafes, restaurants and terraces. A narrow pedestrian tunnel gives direct access to the ocean from the dock area.

In the summer of 2014, São Martinho was visited by a seal, probably coming from France, England or Iceland. The animal became known as "Martinha" and was the "mascot" of the village that summer.

Visitor attractions include Mother Church, a temple from the 18th century. In its interior stands out, behind the altar, a large canvas, painted with oil, with the image of the miracle of São Martinho. At the Chapel of Santo António, there is a small temple on the top of a hill. Its interior is simple, decorated with only two images: The patron's and the Virgin's. Outside, blue and white tile panels, representing the legend of the miracle of the formation of the "lake", the cove that forms before the entrance of the access bar to the bay of São Martinho do Porto.

== Points of interest ==
- Viewpoint – Located on the Santo António hill, offers a privileged view to the bay.
- Lighthouse of the Santo António hill – In remote times next to a fort that defended the entrance of the bay, it is part of an orientation system for the sailors that includes two headlights located in the dunes, in front of the bar.
- Tunnel – It is a pleasant walk and the contemplation of the opposite sides of the tunnel provides a sublime experience. On one side, the calm waters of the Bay, on the other the rough waters of the Atlantic Ocean that hit with violence in the rocks.
- Garden of the Engineer Frederico Ulrich Square – Green leisure space dedicated to children.
- José Bento da Silva School – Inaugurated in 1883 with the purpose of training primary and secondary education, today it is the seat of Town Council, Culture House José Bento da Silva, Library and Environmental Defense Association of São Martinho do Porto.
- Viewpoint of the José Bento da Silva Square – Privileged view over the Bay and direct access to the Outeiro Elevator.
- Ruins (Salir do Porto) – Ruins of the artisanal Customs where the caravels that participated in the discoveries and conquests were built, in the reigns of D. Afonso V and D. João II. Here were also built part of the ships that took D. Sebastião to Alcácer Quibir.
- Little Slop (Salir do Porto) – It is a spring of fresh water that is born near the ocean. It is believed to be a miraculous water for many diseases, namely to have properties beneficial to skin problems.
- Dune (Salir do Porto) – Once the largest of Europe, the Dune of Salir stands out in the landscape of São Martinho Bay, with an altitude of approximately 50m and 200m in length. The core of the Dune consists in part of a red sandstone, vestige of an older fossil dune.

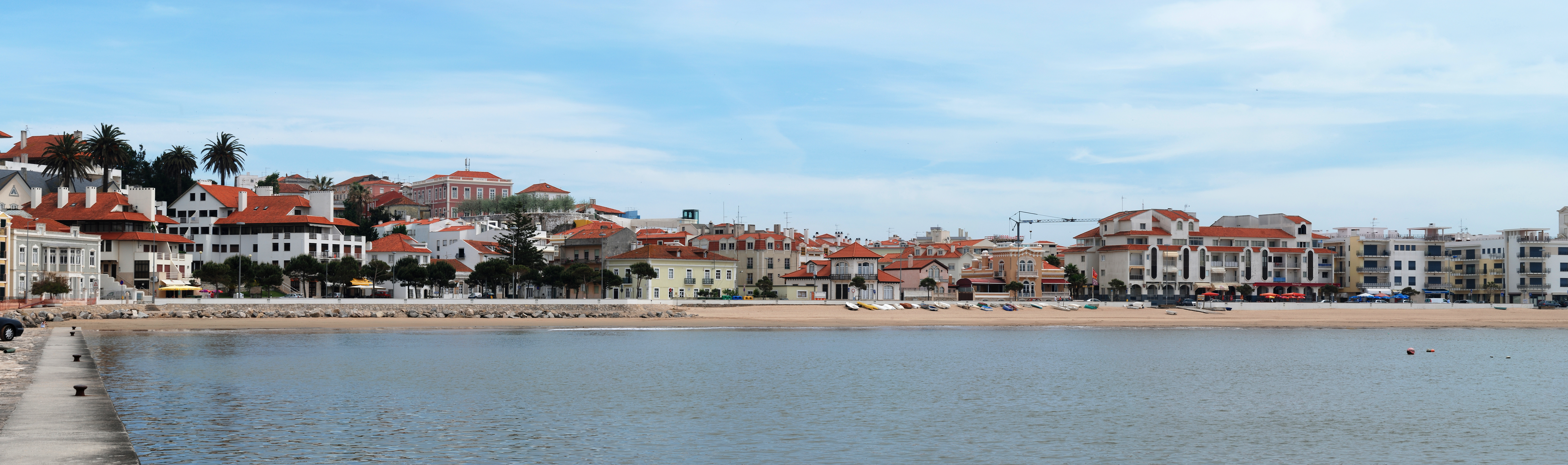
São Martinho do Porto: Panoramic view of the beach and village
