= Spartak! =

Former musical collective from Portugal

- Origin: Alcobaça, Portugal
- Genres: Rock, pop, electro
- Years active: 2006–2008
- Past members: Tiago Matos; Márcio Duarte; Davide Vicente; Miguel Nicolau; Emanuel Severino

Spartak! were a musical collective from Alcobaça, Portugal. Although Alcobaça is relatively small, it maintains a music scene including Loto, The Gift and Samuel Jerónimo. Spartak's debut EP Spartak! One (released in May 2006) was produced by Ricardo Coelho of Loto.

== History ==
The band did not maintain a "fixed" lineup, but recorded as a collective of various members in order to accommodate a variety of artistic ideas. The live band generally performed with one lead vocalist, two guitarists, bass, a keyboardist, and a drummer, and occasionally an image projectionist. In addition to founding members Tiago Matos, Márcio Duarte, Wagner Fernandes, and Carlos Sousa, other live band members have included JT (Loto), Nuno Ruas, and Nuno Oliveira.

Nuno Galopim (national radio broadcaster and journalist with Diário de Notícias) wrote an editorial upon their debut, stating "By their own hand, Spartak! signal with their debut EP the best moment of pop we've heard since 2004. It's great to discover such a good cocktail of references inside a collection of five songs; this EP demonstrates just why it's a good idea to keep one's eye trained on the center of the country [Portugal]". The EP also received airplay on Portuguese national radio stations Rádio Radar, Coimbra University Radio and via DJs Fernando Alvim and Henrique Amaro on RDP Antena 3. The band completed a Portuguese national tour in 2006.

In 2008, Spartak! recorded their final single "Hyperspace". As with the original EP, "Hyperspace" was also produced by Ricardo Coelho, with mixing by Armando Teixeira (Balla, Bulllet). Spartak! disbanded in May 2008.

== Discography ==
- Spartak! One (EP) - 2006

== Other projects ==
- 2006 - CD Acorda! Nova Música Portuguesa - "King Tubby", "Spartak!One"
- 2007 - CD Novo Rock Português (Chiado Records) - "King Tubby"
