= Évora de Alcobaça =

- Civil parish
- Location in Portugal
- Coordinates: 39.516°N 8.971°W
- Country: Portugal
- Region: Oeste e Vale do Tejo
- Intermunic. comm.: Oeste
- District: Leiria
- Municipality: Alcobaça

Area
  - Total: 42.42 km^{2} (16.38 sq mi)

Population (2011)
  - Total: 4,485
  - Density: 105.7/km^{2} (273.8/sq mi)
- Time zone: UTC+00:00 (WET)
  - Summer (DST): UTC+01:00 (WEST)

Évora de Alcobaça is a freguesia ("civil parish") in the municipality of Alcobaça, Portugal. The population in 2011 was 4,485, in an area of 42.42 km^{2}.

== History ==
Combat of Évora de Alcobaça
- Part of the Peninsular War
Date	8 December 1810
Location	Évora de Alcobaça, Alcobaça, Portugal
Result	Portuguese victory

Belligerents
Portugal	(France) French Empire

Commanders and leaders
(Portugal) Captain Joseph Fenwick (WIA)	(France) Unknown

Strength
~80 militia	80 grenadiers

Casualties and losses
1 officer, unknown	Unknown

The Combat of Évora de Alcobaça took place on the 8th December 1810, during the Third French Invasion of Portugal. A foraging party of 80 French grenadiers was defeated by a detachment of about 80 of the Óbidos militia, led by Captain Joseph Fenwick. The captain was wounded in action and died of his wounds two days later. William Carr Beresford, Commander in Chief of the Portuguese Army, later lamented the loss of the young captain of the 1/3rd "The Buffs".
