= Vestiaria =

Vestiaria may refer to:

- Vestiaria, Portugal
- Vestiaria, former genus of ʻIʻiwi, or scarlet honeycreeper, a bird
