= Cela, Alcobaça =

Cela
- Civil parish
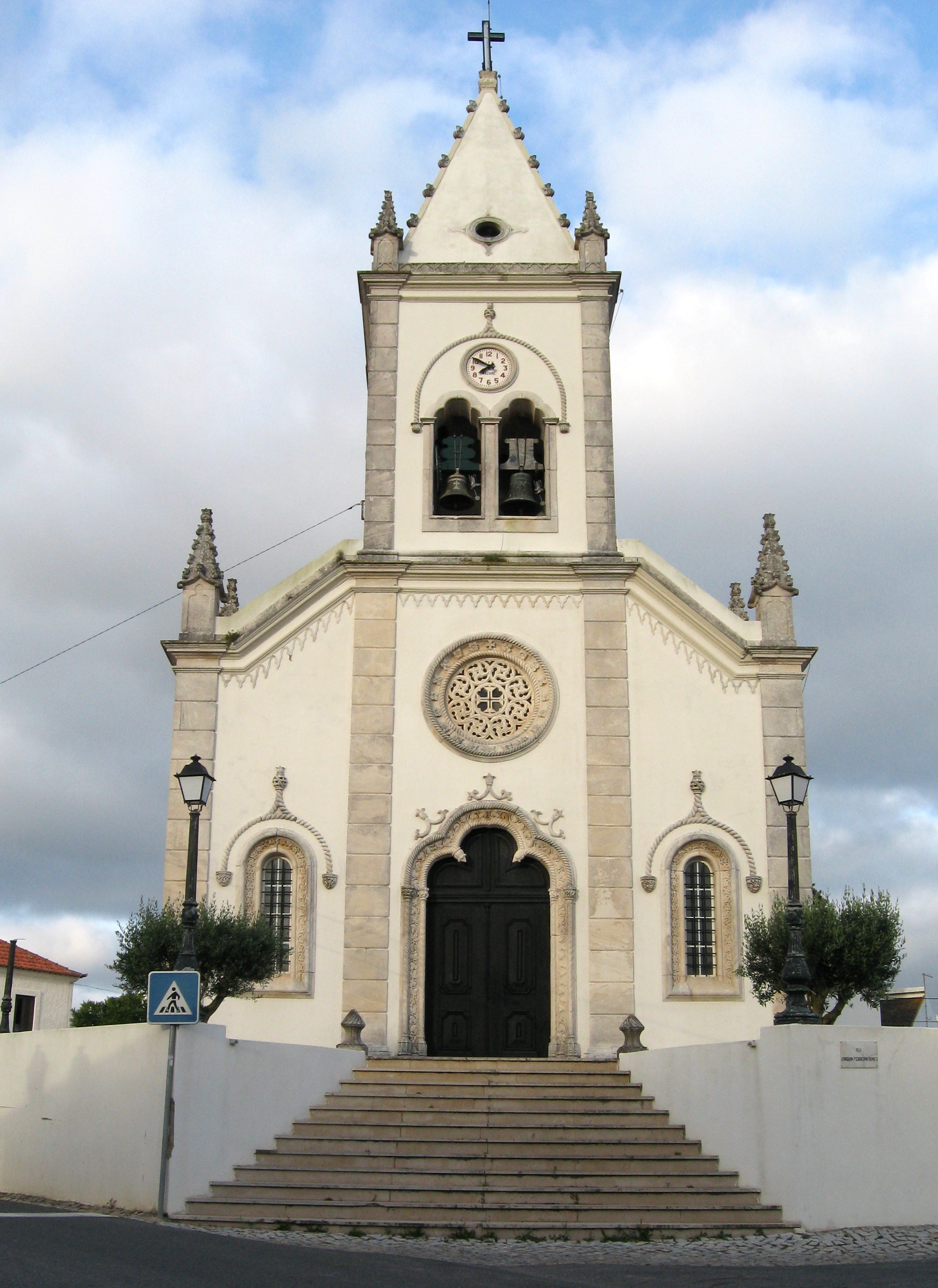
- The Manueline style church of Santo André

- Location in Portugal
- Coordinates: 39.537°N 9.038°W
- Country: Portugal
- Region: Oeste e Vale do Tejo
- Intermunic. comm.: Oeste
- District: Leiria
- Municipality: Alcobaça

Area
  - Total: 25.83 km^{2} (9.97 sq mi)

Population (2011)
  - Total: 3,264
  - Density: 126.4/km^{2} (327.3/sq mi)
- Time zone: UTC+00:00 (WET)
  - Summer (DST): UTC+01:00 (WEST)

Cela is a freguesia (civil parish) in the municipality of Alcobaça, Portugal. The population in 2011 was 3,264, in an area of 25.83 km^{2}. It received town status in 1999.

== Climate ==
Climate data for Cela, 1981-2020, altitude: 2 m (6.6 ft)
Month	Jan	Feb	Mar	Apr	May	Jun	Jul	Aug	Sep	Oct	Nov	Dec	Year
Mean daily maximum °C (°F)	14.5 (58.1)	14.9 (58.8)	17.1 (62.8)	17.8 (64.0)	19.5 (67.1)	21.6 (70.9)	23.1 (73.6)	23.4 (74.1)	22.7 (72.9)	20.5 (68.9)	17.2 (63.0)	15.0 (59.0)	18.9 (66.1)
Daily mean °C (°F)	9.9 (49.8)	10.6 (51.1)	12.3 (54.1)	13.5 (56.3)	15.4 (59.7)	17.5 (63.5)	18.8 (65.8)	18.9 (66.0)	17.8 (64.0)	15.9 (60.6)	12.8 (55.0)	10.9 (51.6)	14.5 (58.1)
Mean daily minimum °C (°F)	5.3 (41.5)	6.3 (43.3)	7.5 (45.5)	9.2 (48.6)	11.3 (52.3)	13.4 (56.1)	14.5 (58.1)	14.4 (57.9)	12.9 (55.2)	11.3 (52.3)	8.4 (47.1)	6.1 (43.0)	10.1 (50.1)
Average precipitation mm (inches)	78.7 (3.10)	62.1 (2.44)	42.4 (1.67)	64.4 (2.54)	52.1 (2.05)	18.1 (0.71)	9.1 (0.36)	13.6 (0.54)	32.0 (1.26)	84.5 (3.33)	99.4 (3.91)	91.6 (3.61)	648 (25.52)
Source: Portuguese Environment Agency
