= Bača =

Bača may refer to:

- Bača (river), Slovenia
- Bača pri Modreju, a village in the Municipality of Tolmin, Slovenia
- Bača pri Podbrdu, a dispersed settlement in the Municipality of Tolmin, Slovenia
- Bača subdialect, of Slovene
- Bača (surname)

== See also ==
- Baca (disambiguation)
- Bacca (disambiguation)
- Backa (disambiguation)
