= Alfeizerão =

- Civil parish
- Location in Portugal
- Coordinates: 39.500°N 9.104°W
- Country: Portugal
- Region: Oeste e Vale do Tejo
- Intermunic. comm.: Oeste
- District: Leiria
- Municipality: Alcobaça

Area
  - Total: 27.99 km^{2} (10.81 sq mi)

Population (2011)
  - Total: 3,854
  - Density: 137.7/km^{2} (356.6/sq mi)
- Time zone: UTC+00:00 (WET)
  - Summer (DST): UTC+01:00 (WEST)

Alfeizerão is a freguesia ("civil parish") in the municipality of Alcobaça, Portugal. The population in 2011 was 3,854, in an area of 27.99 km^{2}.

Its parish seat is the town of Alfeizerão.
