= Alcobaça, Portugal =

Alcobaça
- Municipality
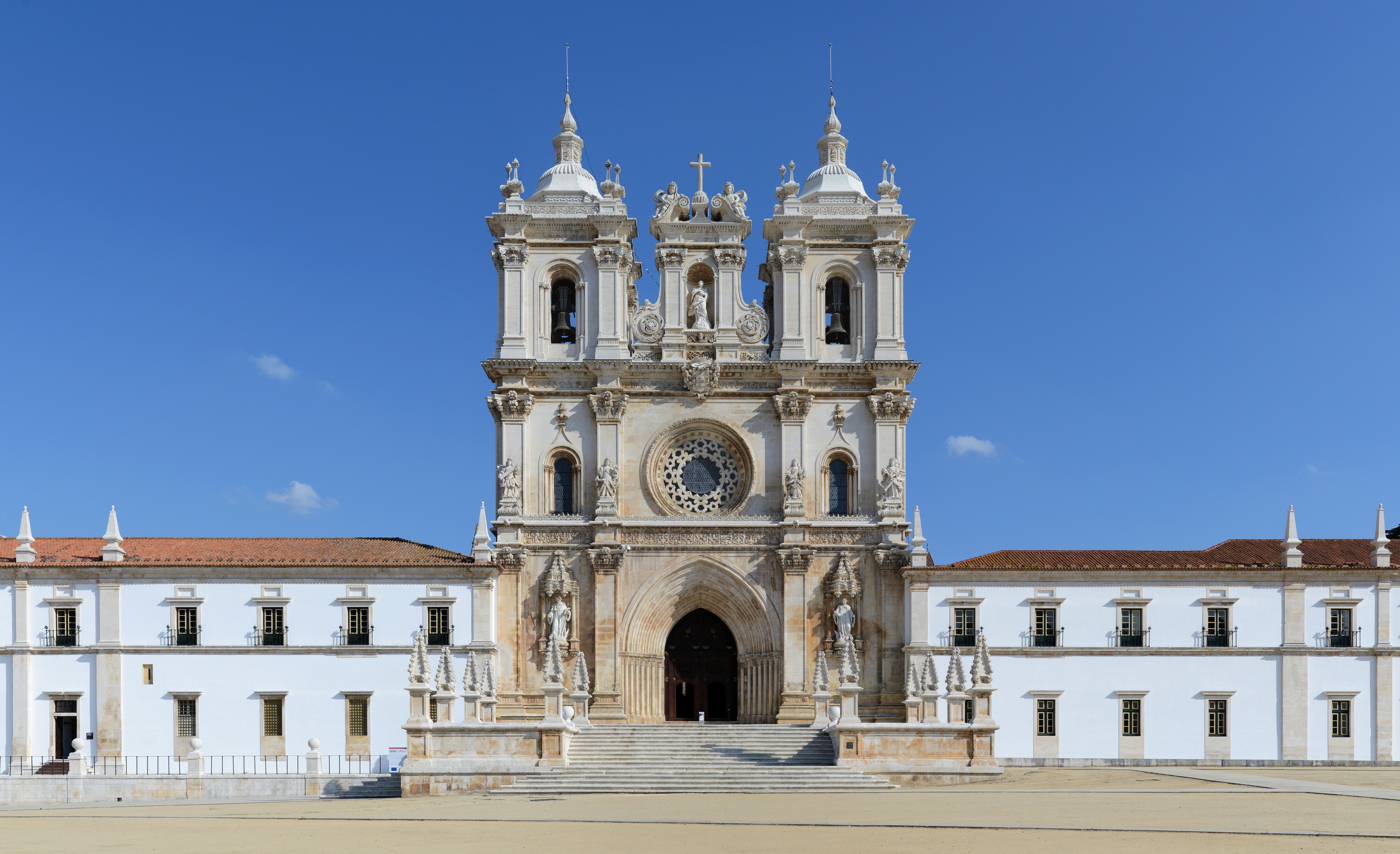
- Alcobaça Monastery

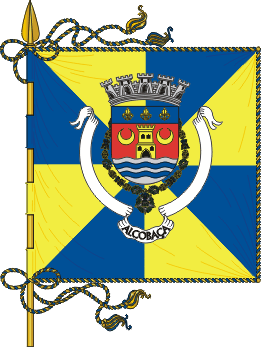
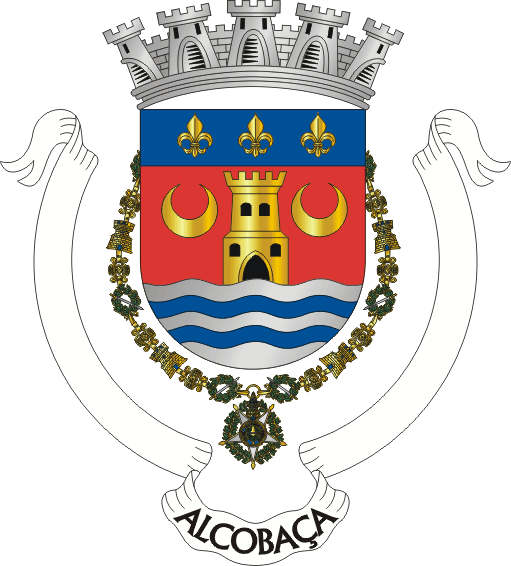
- Flag Coat of arms
- Interactive map of Alcobaça
- Location in Portugal
- Coordinates: 39°33′10″N 8°58′40″W
- Country: Portugal
- Region: Oeste e Vale do Tejo
- Intermunic. comm.: Oeste
- District: Leiria
- Parishes: 13

Government
  - President: Hermínio Rodrigues (PSD)

Area
  - Total: 408.14 km^{2} (157.58 sq mi)
- Elevation: 42 m (138 ft)

Population (2011)
  - Total: 53,649
  - Density: 131.45/km^{2} (340.45/sq mi)
- Time zone: UTC+00:00 (WET)
  - Summer (DST): UTC+01:00 (WEST)
- Postal code: 2460, 2461, 2475
- Patron: Saint Bernard
- Local holiday: 20 August
- Website: www.cm-alcobaca.pt

Alcobaça (Portuguese pronunciation: [alkuˈβasɐ]) is a Portuguese city and municipality in the intermunicipal community Oeste and the region Oeste e Vale do Tejo, in the historical province of Estremadura, and in the Leiria District. The city grew along the valleys of the rivers Alcoa and Baça, from which it derives its name. The municipality population in 2011 was 56,693, in an area of 408.14 square kilometres (157.58 mi^{2}). The city proper has a population of 15,800 inhabitants.

The city of Alcobaça became notable after the first king of Portugal, Afonso Henriques, decided to build a church to commemorate the Conquest of Santarém from the Moors in 1147. The church later evolved into the Monastery of Alcobaça, one of the most magnificent Gothic monuments in the country. In the church are the tombs of Pedro I of Portugal and his murdered mistress Inês de Castro. Over the centuries this monastery played an important role in shaping Portuguese culture.

A few kilometers to the north of Alcobaça is the Monastery of Batalha, another Gothic building constructed in memory of a different important battle, that of Aljubarrota. To the west of Alcobaça is the fishing village of Nazaré, now a popular resort town. To the south is the city of Caldas da Rainha and the medieval town of Óbidos. To the northeast is the town of Porto de Mós with its rebuilt castle.

== History ==
Alcobaça became notable in the 12th century, when it was chosen as the future site of Portugal's largest church. In March 1147, the young King Dom Afonso Henriques defeated the Moors by capturing the city of Santarém. As a tribute to his victory, he vowed to build a magnificent home for the Order of Cistercians. It took another 76 years before this task was completed. The monarchy continued to carry out further construction and 60 years later King Dinis built the main cloister. The monastery was consecrated in 1262.

The church contains the tombs of Pedro I of Portugal and his murdered mistress Inês de Castro. Pedro had married Constanza, the Infanta (princess) of Castile, but escaped with his mistress Inês and later lived in the city of Coimbra. His father, King Afonso IV, believing that the family of Inês was a threat to his kingdom, had her murdered. Shortly after the death of his father, Pedro declared that he had married Inês in a prior secret ceremony in Bragança, and took a gruesome revenge on the killers and exhumed her body. He presented the embalmed corpse at the court with a crown on her head and demanded that all his courtiers kneel and individually pay homage to her decomposed hand. Today, their ornate tombs face each other so that on Judgment Day his first sight would be of Inês.

During the following centuries, the monks from this monastery had a major influence on the development of Portuguese culture. In 1269 they were the first to give public lessons to their congregation, and later they produced the first authoritative history on Portugal in a series of books. In 1810, the invading French pillaged the abbey, taking with them most of its most important treasures, including the noteworthy library. The items that remained were later stolen in 1834 during an anti-clerical riot and the banning of religious orders in Portugal.

In January 2026, Storm Kristin caused a catastrophic impact in the municipality of Alcobaça, leaving dozens of people homeless and affecting 75% of the municipality's electricity network.

Alcobaça joined the UNESCO Global Network of Learning Cities in 2019.

== Climate ==
Alcobaça has a Mediterranean climate (Köppen:Csb) with warm, dry summers and mild, wet winters.

Climate data for Alcobaça, Portugal, 1991–2020 normals
Month	Jan	Feb	Mar	Apr	May	Jun	Jul	Aug	Sep	Oct	Nov	Dec	Year
Record high °C (°F)	23.7 (74.7)	25.0 (77.0)	29.8 (85.6)	33.0 (91.4)	35.3 (95.5)	40.1 (104.2)	40.0 (104.0)	42.8 (109.0)	38.5 (101.3)	35.0 (95.0)	28.3 (82.9)	23.7 (74.7)	42.8 (109.0)
Mean daily maximum °C (°F)	15.3 (59.5)	16.3 (61.3)	18.5 (65.3)	19.7 (67.5)	22.1 (71.8)	24.6 (76.3)	26.1 (79.0)	27.0 (80.6)	25.9 (78.6)	22.9 (73.2)	18.2 (64.8)	16.1 (61.0)	21.1 (69.9)
Daily mean °C (°F)	9.7 (49.5)	10.4 (50.7)	12.7 (54.9)	14.0 (57.2)	16.3 (61.3)	18.9 (66.0)	20.5 (68.9)	20.9 (69.6)	19.4 (66.9)	16.7 (62.1)	12.5 (54.5)	10.6 (51.1)	15.2 (59.4)
Mean daily minimum °C (°F)	4.0 (39.2)	4.5 (40.1)	6.8 (44.2)	8.2 (46.8)	10.4 (50.7)	13.1 (55.6)	14.9 (58.8)	14.8 (58.6)	13.0 (55.4)	10.5 (50.9)	6.9 (44.4)	5.2 (41.4)	9.4 (48.8)
Record low °C (°F)	−6.7 (19.9)	−6.2 (20.8)	−5.2 (22.6)	−0.5 (31.1)	1.0 (33.8)	4.7 (40.5)	7.3 (45.1)	6.0 (42.8)	3.5 (38.3)	0.2 (32.4)	−5.6 (21.9)	−5.8 (21.6)	−6.7 (19.9)
Average precipitation mm (inches)	112.6 (4.43)	81.7 (3.22)	74.1 (2.92)	83.2 (3.28)	61.8 (2.43)	18.8 (0.74)	7.5 (0.30)	12.7 (0.50)	38.1 (1.50)	102.5 (4.04)	127.8 (5.03)	104.4 (4.11)	825.2 (32.5)
Average precipitation days (≥ 1 mm)	11.7	8.9	9.3	10.0	7.7	3.6	1.5	2.0	4.9	9.8	11.8	11.0	92.2
Average relative humidity (%)	78	76	71	69	68	69	68	67	69	73	77	78	72
Source: Instituto Português do Mar e da Atmosfera

Climate data for Alcobaça, Portugal, 1981–2010 normals
Month	Jan	Feb	Mar	Apr	May	Jun	Jul	Aug	Sep	Oct	Nov	Dec	Year
Record high °C (°F)	23.7 (74.7)	25.0 (77.0)	29.8 (85.6)	33.0 (91.4)	35.3 (95.5)	40.8 (105.4)	40.0 (104.0)	41.0 (105.8)	39.4 (102.9)	33.0 (91.4)	27.9 (82.2)	24.0 (75.2)	41.0 (105.8)
Mean daily maximum °C (°F)	15.2 (59.4)	16.1 (61.0)	18.6 (65.5)	19.2 (66.6)	21.3 (70.3)	24.4 (75.9)	26.0 (78.8)	26.6 (79.9)	25.6 (78.1)	22.3 (72.1)	18.3 (64.9)	15.8 (60.4)	20.8 (69.4)
Daily mean °C (°F)	8.4 (47.1)	9.5 (49.1)	11.6 (52.9)	12.7 (54.9)	14.8 (58.6)	17.9 (64.2)	19.6 (67.3)	19.8 (67.6)	18.5 (65.3)	15.4 (59.7)	11.7 (53.1)	9.7 (49.5)	14.1 (57.4)
Mean daily minimum °C (°F)	4.0 (39.2)	4.9 (40.8)	6.7 (44.1)	8.1 (46.6)	10.2 (50.4)	13.1 (55.6)	14.7 (58.5)	14.6 (58.3)	13.0 (55.4)	10.4 (50.7)	7.2 (45.0)	5.6 (42.1)	9.4 (48.9)
Record low °C (°F)	−5.9 (21.4)	−5.7 (21.7)	−5.2 (22.6)	−0.5 (31.1)	1.0 (33.8)	4.7 (40.5)	6.1 (43.0)	5.5 (41.9)	3.5 (38.3)	0.2 (32.4)	−5.6 (21.9)	−5.8 (21.6)	−5.9 (21.4)
Average precipitation mm (inches)	107.1 (4.22)	82.9 (3.26)	59.9 (2.36)	80.7 (3.18)	59.6 (2.35)	22.7 (0.89)	8.9 (0.35)	12.4 (0.49)	40.3 (1.59)	104.3 (4.11)	122.0 (4.80)	118.5 (4.67)	819.3 (32.27)
Average precipitation days (≥ 1 mm)	11.0	9.4	7.8	10.3	8.1	3.8	1.6	2.0	5.1	10.2	11.1	12.2	92.6
Average relative humidity (%)	78	76	71	69	68	69	68	67	69	73	77	78	72
Source 1: Instituto Português do Mar e da Atmosfera
Source 2: Porto de Mós Municipality (IPMA: Humidity)

Climate data for Alcobaça, Portugal, 1971–2000 normals
Month	Jan	Feb	Mar	Apr	May	Jun	Jul	Aug	Sep	Oct	Nov	Dec	Year
Record high °C (°F)	23.1 (73.6)	25.0 (77.0)	30.0 (86.0)	30.0 (86.0)	34.0 (93.2)	40.8 (105.4)	40.0 (104.0)	38.0 (100.4)	39.4 (102.9)	33.2 (91.8)	26.6 (79.9)	24.0 (75.2)	40.8 (105.4)
Mean daily maximum °C (°F)	15.1 (59.2)	15.8 (60.4)	18.2 (64.8)	19.0 (66.2)	20.8 (69.4)	23.7 (74.7)	25.9 (78.6)	26.2 (79.2)	25.6 (78.1)	22.0 (71.6)	18.4 (65.1)	15.9 (60.6)	20.6 (69.1)
Daily mean °C (°F)	9.6 (49.3)	10.6 (51.1)	12.4 (54.3)	13.6 (56.5)	15.5 (59.9)	18.4 (65.1)	20.3 (68.5)	20.3 (68.5)	19.3 (66.7)	16.2 (61.2)	13.1 (55.6)	11.1 (52.0)	15.0 (59.0)
Mean daily minimum °C (°F)	4.2 (39.6)	5.4 (41.7)	6.7 (44.1)	8.1 (46.6)	10.2 (50.4)	13.0 (55.4)	14.7 (58.5)	14.4 (57.9)	13.0 (55.4)	10.4 (50.7)	7.9 (46.2)	6.4 (43.5)	9.5 (49.1)
Record low °C (°F)	−5.5 (22.1)	−5.0 (23.0)	−3.0 (26.6)	−0.5 (31.1)	1.0 (33.8)	5.5 (41.9)	6.0 (42.8)	5.5 (41.9)	3.5 (38.3)	0.5 (32.9)	−2.5 (27.5)	−4.0 (24.8)	−5.5 (22.1)
Average precipitation mm (inches)	106.0 (4.17)	101.7 (4.00)	59.2 (2.33)	76.1 (3.00)	64.8 (2.55)	23.8 (0.94)	7.8 (0.31)	11.8 (0.46)	36.2 (1.43)	95.2 (3.75)	124.9 (4.92)	132.1 (5.20)	839.6 (33.06)
Average precipitation days (≥ 0.1 mm)	13.6	13.1	10.4	12.4	11.1	6.8	3.1	3.4	6.4	11.4	13.8	15.5	121.0
Source: Instituto Português do Mar e da Atmosfera

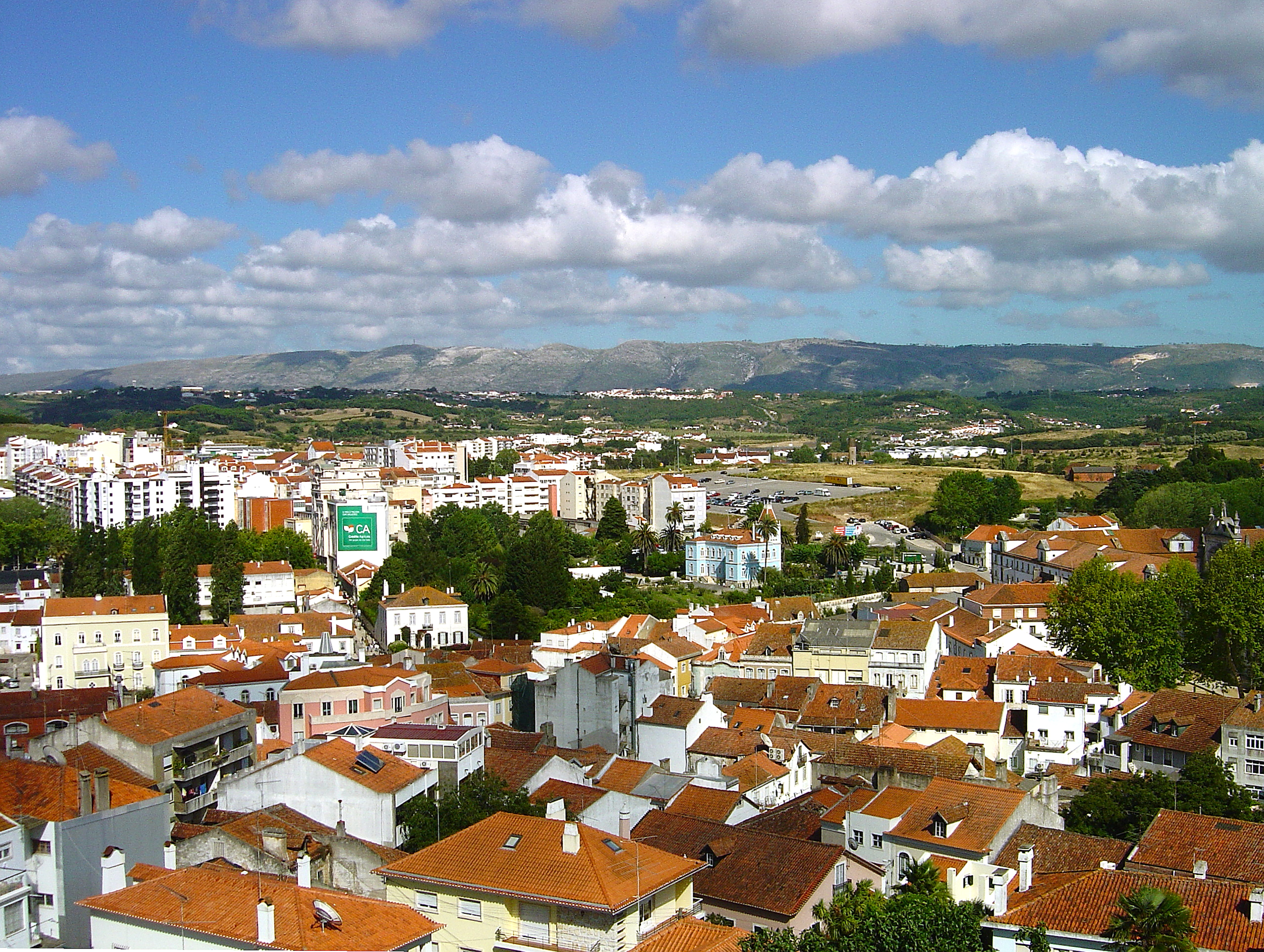
View of the city with Serra de Candeeiros in the background

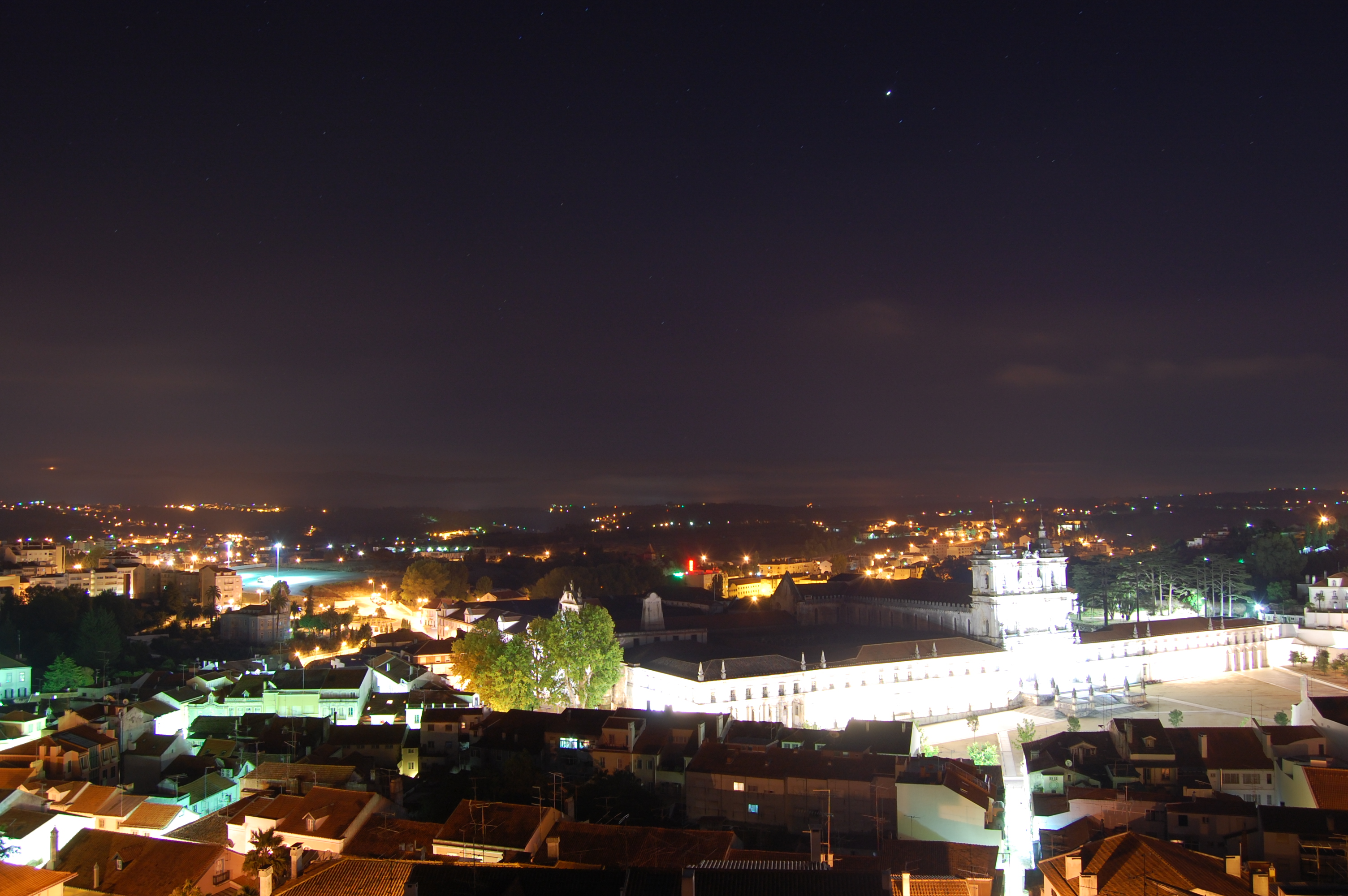
Alcobaça and the monastery at night

== Parishes ==
Administratively, the municipality is divided into 13 civil parishes (freguesias):

- Alcobaça e Vestiaria
- Alfeizerão
- Aljubarrota
- Bárrio
- Benedita
- Cela
- Coz, Alpedriz e Montes
- Évora de Alcobaça
- Maiorga
- Pataias e Martingança
- São Martinho do Porto
- Turquel
- Vimeiro

== City information ==
The main feature of the city is the monastery that presents a long and sombre façade with 18th-century embellishments. This austerity is emphasized in the cloisters with its name of "Cloister of Silence". In contrast, within the Abbey is the massive kitchen with a running stream specially diverted to pass through as a supply of fresh water. The open area of the kitchen chimney is large enough to take a whole ox for roasting. The surround to the sacristy doorway is an example of Manueline decoration. In 1794, Lord Beckford visited the Abbey and commented that he found some 300 monks "living in a very splendid manner"!

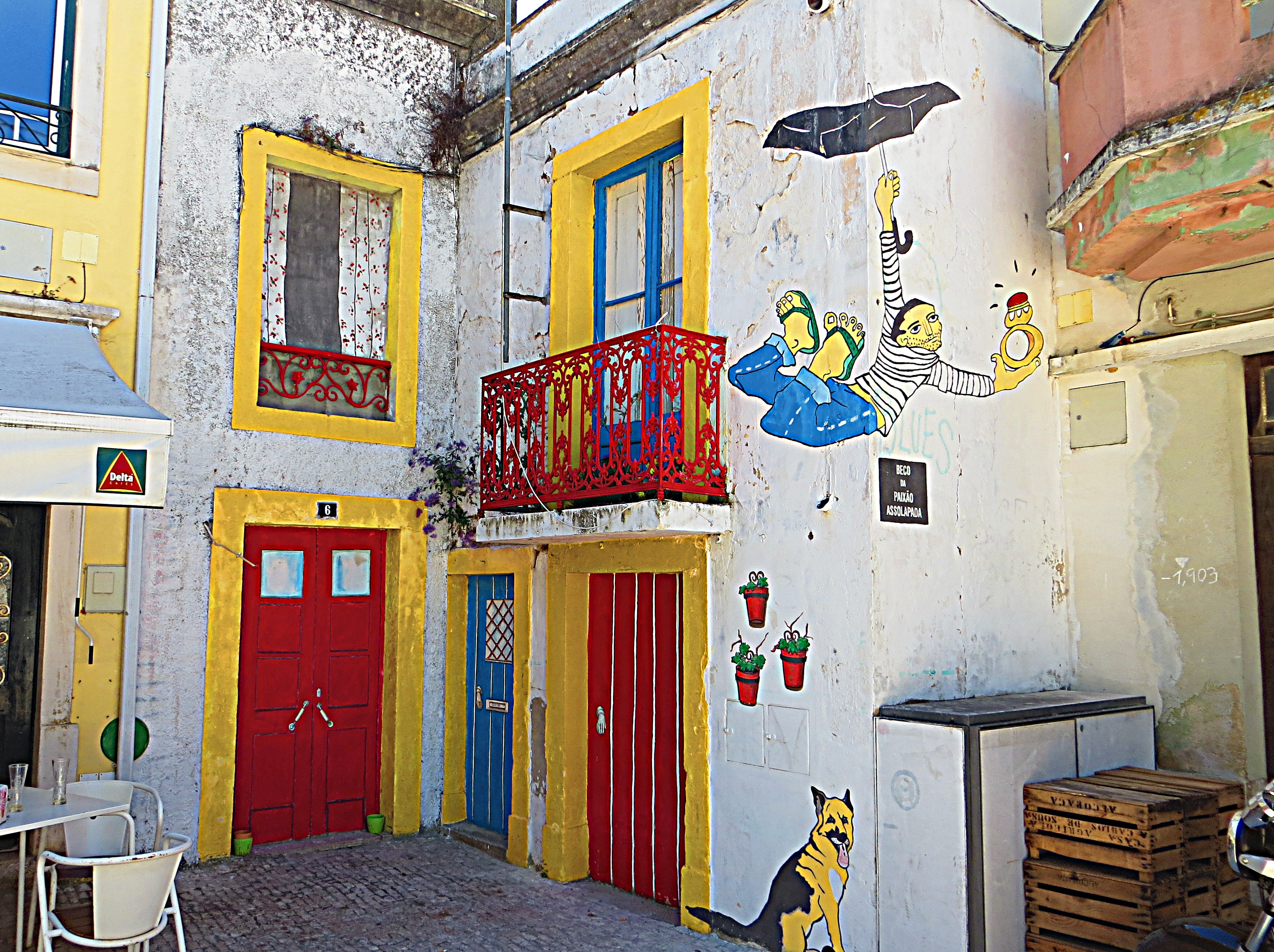
Alcobaça, panoramio

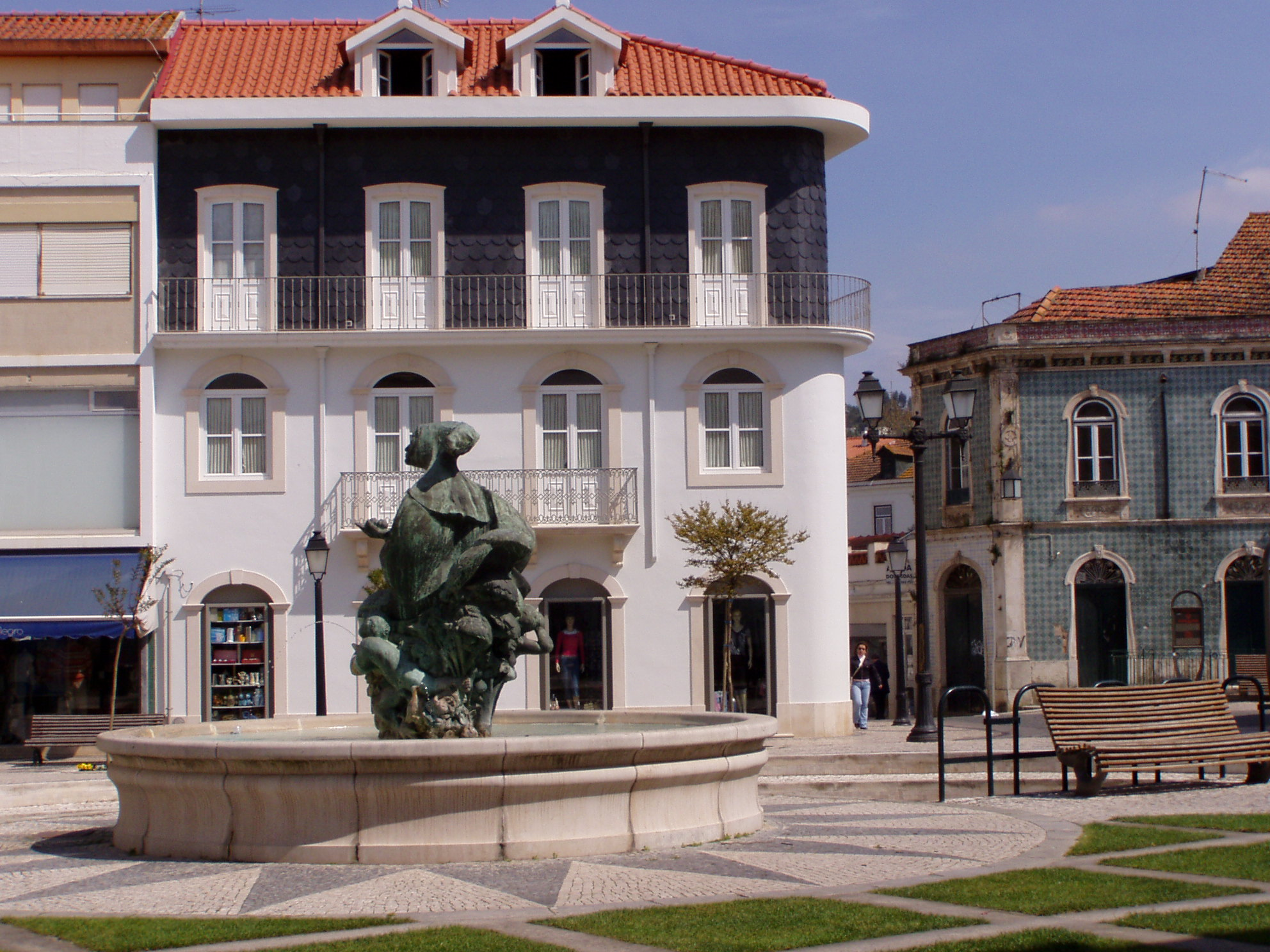
Square in Alcobaça

== Nearby locations ==
Gothic fountain house and renaissance water basin in the cloister of the Alcobaça Monastery.

A few kilometers to the north of Alcobaça is another building constructed in memory of a different important battle, that of Aljubarrota in 1385, when King John I of Portugal defeated the Castilians and ensuring two hundred years of independence from the Castilian invaders. The construction of the Abbey at Batalha commenced in 1388 and was added to by various Portuguese Kings over these next two centuries. To the east of Batalha is the world-famous location of Fátima and a point of pilgrimage for the Roman Catholic religion due to the vision of the Virgin Mary in 1917 by three young children whilst tending their flock. To the west of Alcobaça is the well-known fishing village of Nazaré. Today, the village is now a small town and a popular holiday resort with most of its past and traditions having rapidly evaporated in the course of time. A very successful Portuguese feature film was made in the early 20th century that dramatically captured the primitive and dangerous life of these fishermen. Stoutly Catholic, the inhabitants have retained some of their past as can be still seen in their own particular style of costume. To the south is Caldas da Rainha and the quaint medieval town of Óbidos that is an attraction for any tourists that enjoys a true glimpse of the past. Also to the south is the town of Porto de Mós with its fanciful rebuilt castle. This town borders the Nature Reserve Parque Natural das Serras de Aire e Candeeiros. These 390 square kilometres of limestone-covered landscape is also known for its caverns. The best known being the Grutas de Mira de Aire can be visited and consists of tunnels, caverns with stalactites, stalagmites, lakes, and a music and light finale.

== Major events ==
- Market days – Every Monday
- Carnaval de Alcobaça – February/March
- Cistermúsica – classical music festival – June / July
- Saint Bernard's fair – August 20
- Municipal holiday – August 20
- Marionetas na Cidade – puppetry festival – mid-October
- Saint Simon's fair – 4th week of October
- International display of Sweets and Conventual Liqueurs – November

== Notable people from Alcobaça ==
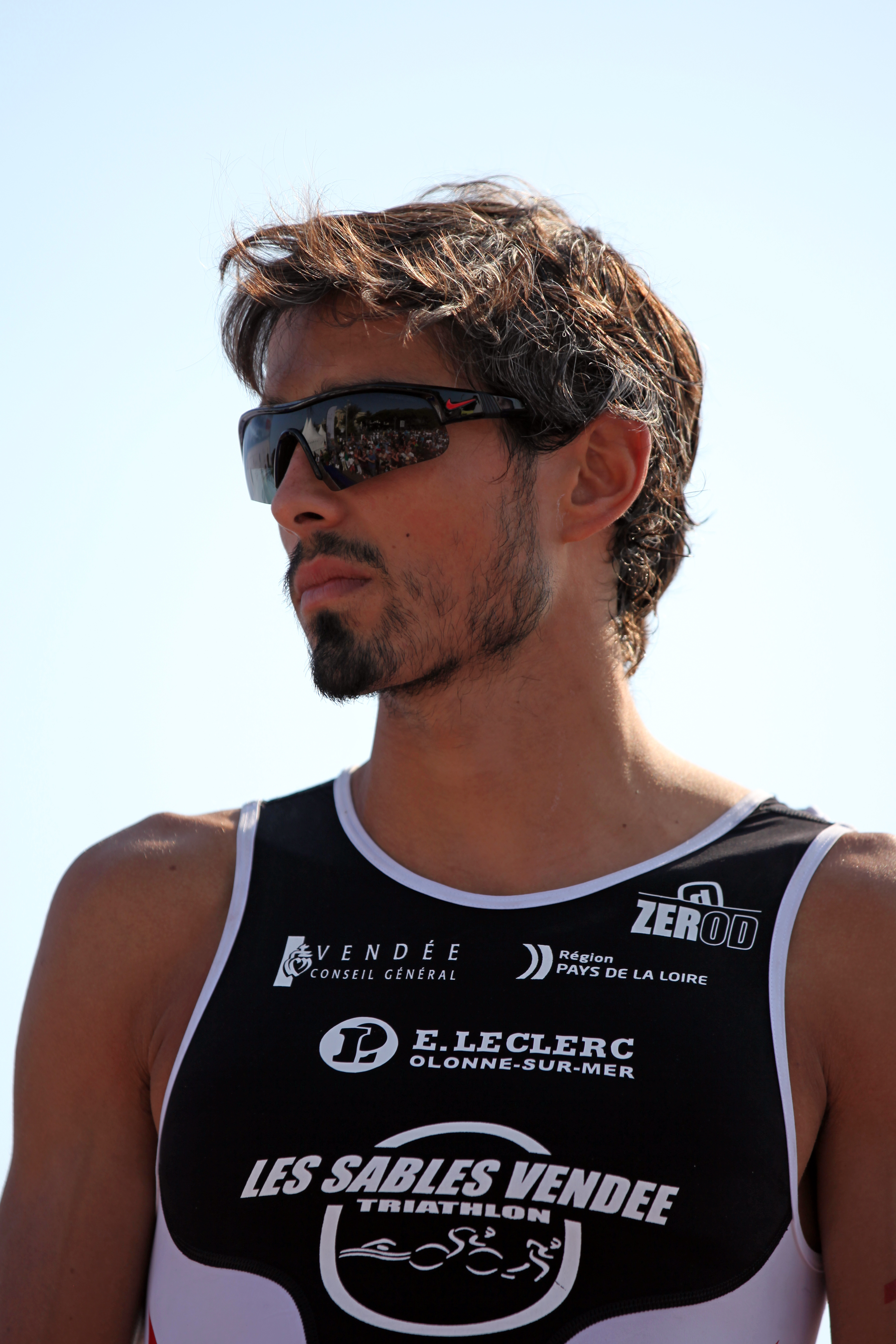
João Pedro Silva, 2012

- Joaquim Ferreira Bogalho (1889–1977) the 20th president of S.L. Benfica
- Virgínia Vitorino (1895–1967) a teacher, poet and playwright.
- Joaquim Vieira de Natividade, (Wiki PT) (1899–1968) an agricultural engineer
- Valdemar José Correia Barbosa Rodrigues, (Wiki PT) (b. 1965) an environmental engineer, ensaist and poet
- José Aurélio, (Wiki PT) (born 1938) a sculptor, works in stone, wood and bronze
- João Lourenço (born 1942) a former footballer with 207 club caps
- Alberto Costa (born 1947) politician, Minister of Justice, 2005–2009.
- Nuno Gonçalves, a Portuguese musician, founder of The Gift.
- João Traquina (born 1988) a Portuguese footballer with over 350 club caps
- João Pedro Silva (born 1989) a Portuguese professional triathlete, competed at the 2012 Summer Olympics
- The Gift (formed 1994) a Portuguese alternative rock band
- Loto (formed 2002) an electro-pop-rock-dance music band
- Spartak! (2006–2008) a musical collective from Alcobaça

== International relations ==
Alcobaça is twinned with:

- Aubergenville, France
- Bełchatów, Poland
- Cacuaco, Angola
- Chicopee, United States

== See also ==
- Alcobaça IPR
- Monastery of Alcobaça
- Monastery of Batalha
- Nazaré
