= Bacas =

Bacas may refer to:

- Belgian Academy Council of Applied Sciences
- Bazas, a commune of the Gironde département, in southwestern France

== See also ==
- Baca (disambiguation)
