= Bacca =

Bacca (Latin for berry) may refer to:

- A simple, indehiscent, fleshy fruit
- Purpura bacca, fruit of the açaí palm
- Bacca, a tag game, see British Bulldog (game)
- Bacca, character in Star Wars: Knights of the Old Republic
- Bacca (English), Short form of tobacco.
- Bacca (surname)
- Bacca (Tanzanian footballer) (born 1997), Ibrahim Hamad, Tanzanian footballer

== See also ==
- Baca (disambiguation)
- Bača (disambiguation)
- Backa (disambiguation)
