= Moinhos Velhos Cave =

Cave system in the Estremadura Limestone Massif, Portugal

Coordinates: 39.5401°N 8.704°W

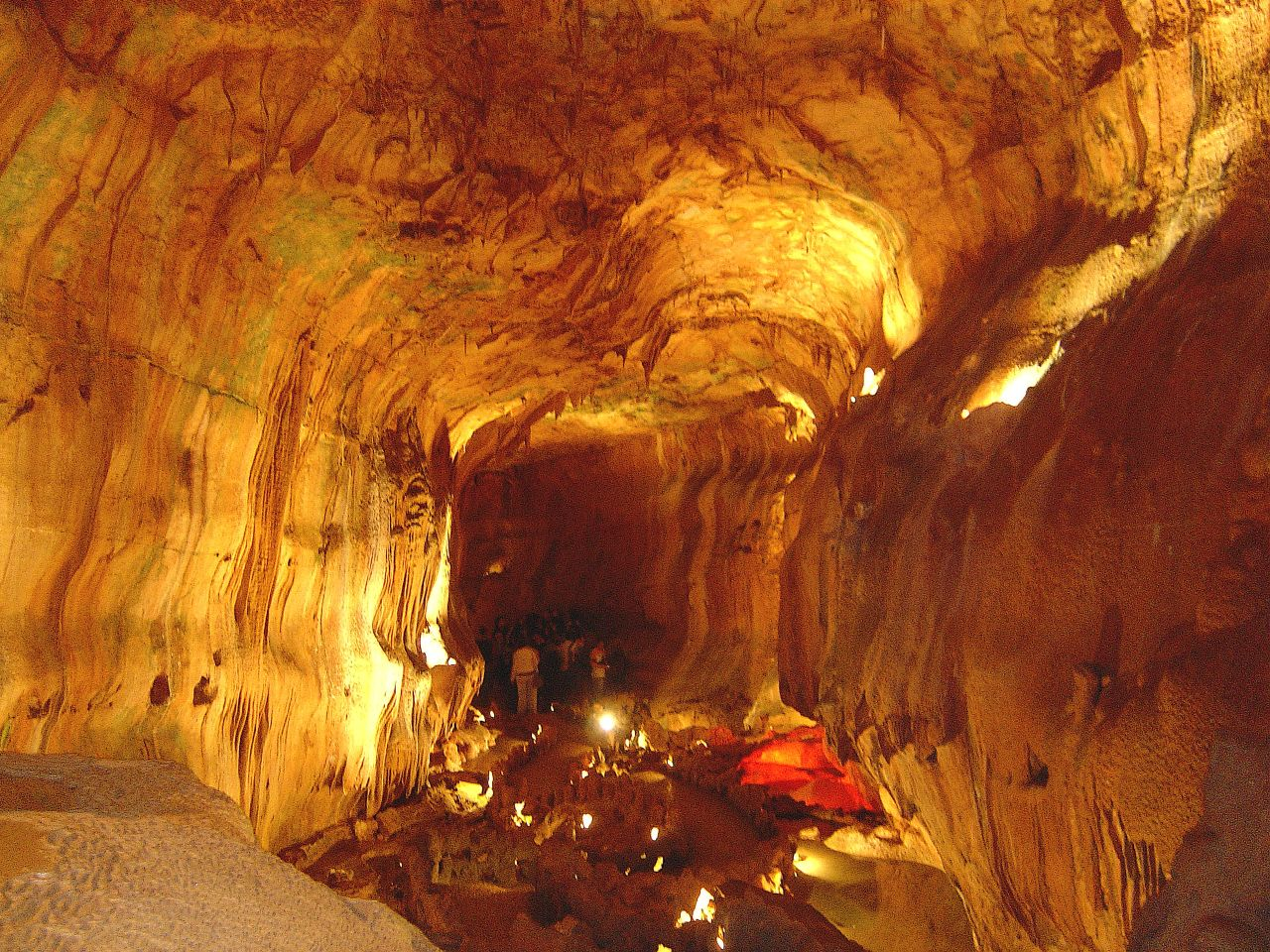
Turistic route of Moinhos Velhos Cave

The Moinhos Velhos Cave (Portuguese: Gruta de Moinhos Velhos), is one of the most important cave systems known in the Portuguese Estremadura Limestone Massif, with about 9 km in extension. It is characterized by the existence of two fóssil paragenetic main conduits of about one decametre in diameter with dendritic tributaries, and a set of semi-active passages in a dendritic pattern at the north and angulate at the south. The fossil zone has a drop of 100 metres and the thickness of intermediate zone varies from 80 metres upstream to 60 metres downstream. Water flows in syngenetic galleries, from the northern to the southern quadrant, towards Gruta da Pena spring. It's possible to distinguish four genetic phases in the cave system development. The first one is represented by superficial phreatic galleries of small diameter, the second one by the Galeria Gémea paragenetic main conduit, the third one by the Galeria Grande and his tributaries and the last one by the active and semi-active galleries of the lower cave levels. This cave is inhabited by several endemic trogobionts: the ground-beetle Trechus lunai, the cave spider Nesticus lusitanicus and by several stygobionts, being the isopod Proaellus lusitanicus the most abundant.

== See also ==
- List of caves
- Mira de Aire Caves
- Moeda Caves
- Serras de Aire e Candeeiros Natural Park
