= Loto (band) =

Portuguese band

- Origin: Alcobaça, Portugal
- Genres: Rock, electronic
- Years active: 1998–present
- Labels: Universal Music Portugal, Som Livre
- Members: Ricardo Coelho; João Tiago; João Pedrosa
- Website: loto.cc

Loto are a Portuguese band from Alcobaça. The band consists of Ricardo, JT and Pedrosa.

Their debut was in October 2002 with the EP Swinging on a Star.

Their album "Beat Riot" features Peter Hook—the bass player from Joy Division and New Order—and guitarist Del Marquis from Scissor Sisters.

== Discography ==
- Swinging on a Star (EP) - 2002
- The Club (LP) - 2004
- We love you (Repackaging The Club + Remixes of "The Club") - 2005
- Beat Riot (LP) - 2006

== Other projects ==
- 2002 - CD Pop Up Songs / Optimus - "a Good Feeling"
- 2003 - CD Frágil XXI - "The Boy"
- 2005 - CD "Mistura Fina" - "Celebration (Celebrate Baby!)

== Cinema, TV ==
- 2007 - Corrupção O.S.T.
- 2007 - Mon Cherie add
- 2007 - Worten add
