= Bačka, Slovakia =

Village and municipality in Slovakia

Bačka Bacska
- Municipality
- Flag

- Location of Bačka in the Košice Region Location of Bačka in Slovakia
- Coordinates: 48°26′N 22°03′E
- Country: Slovakia
- Region: Košice Region
- District: Trebišov District
- First mentioned: 1214

Area
  - Total: 9.57 km^{2} (3.69 sq mi)
- Elevation: 101 m (331 ft)

Population (2025)
  - Total: 576
- Time zone: UTC+1 (CET)
  - Summer (DST): UTC+2 (CEST)
- Postal code: 768 4
- Area code: +421 56
- Vehicle registration plate (until 2022): TV
- Website: www.obecbacka.sk

Bačka (Hungarian: Bacska) is a village and municipality in the Trebišov District in the Košice Region of eastern Slovakia.

== History ==
In historical records the village was first mentioned in 1214 as Bocskay family's property. It was recorded in 1214 as Becheka, in 1299 as Bachka, in 1323 Buchka, and in 1332 as Bachka). Until 1918 and from 1939 to 1944 it belonged to Hungary.

== Geography ==
The municipality lies at an altitude of 101 metres (331 ft) and covers an area of 9.57 km^{2} (3.69 sq mi) (2025).

== Population ==
Population statistic (10 years)
Year	1995	2005	2015	2025
Count	551	608	638	576
Difference		+10.34%	+4.93%	−9.71%

Population statistic
Year	2024	2025
Count	576	576
Difference		+0%

It has a population of 576 people (31 December 2025).

=== Ethnicity ===
Census 2021 (1+ %)
Ethnicity	Number	Fraction
Hungarian	504	80.38%
Slovak	103	16.42%
Romani	64	10.2%
Not found out	63	10.04%
Total	627	

In year 2021 was 627 people by ethnicity 504 as Hungarian, 103 as Slovak, 64 as Romani, 63 as Not found out, 3 as Czech and 1 as Rusyn.

Note on population: The difference values of population numbers in the table "Population statistic" and in the sections "Ethnicity" & "Religion" is caused by the use of various statistical methods.

=== Religion ===
Census 2021 (1+ %)
Religion	Number	Fraction
Roman Catholic Church	247	39.39%
Calvinist Church	170	27.11%
None	103	16.43%
Greek Catholic Church	54	8.61%
Not found out	46	7.34%
Total	627	

In year 2021 was 627 people by religion 247 from Roman Catholic Church, 170 from Calvinist Church, 103 from None, 54 from Greek Catholic Church, 46 from Not found out, 3 from Eastern Orthodox Church, 2 from Jehovah's Witnesses and 2 from Evangelical Church.

== Facilities ==
The village has a public library

== Genealogical resources ==
The records for genealogical research are available at the state archive in Košice (Slovak: Štátny archív v Košiciach).

- Roman Catholic church records (births/marriages/deaths): 1719–1922
- Greek Catholic church records (births/marriages/deaths): 1795–1905
- Reformated church records (births/marriages/deaths): 1809–1929 (parish A)
- Census records 1869 of Backa are available at the state archive.

== See also ==
- List of municipalities and towns in Slovakia
