= FK Bačka =

FK Bačka may refer to:

- FK Bačka Bačka Palanka, a Serbian football club based in Bačka Palanka
- FK Bačka 1901, a Serbian football club based in Subotica
