= Ademir Antonio Bacca =

Brazilian author

- Genre: Poetry, nonfiction
- Subject: Folklore

Website
- Official website

Ademir Antonio Bacca is a Brazilian author. He has published poetry and books of folklore, and edited two periodicals, Garatuja and Laconicus, both of which he started. He has received several literary awards including the Mérito Cultural Juscelino Kubitschek and the Medalha Oscar Bertholdo.

His poetry books include Asas e Coração, A Tragédia dos Anjos, Inventário de Emoções, O Trágico Circo Cotidiano, Página de Jornal, Pandorgas ao Vento, Pátria Amada de Outros Poeminhas Insensatos and Plano de Vôo.

He has created and organised poetry events including the Congresso Brasileiro de Poesia, the Encontro Latino-Americano de Casas de Poetas, the Mostra Internacional de Poesia Visual, the Noite da Poesia Brasileira em Havana and the Semana Oscar Bertholdo de Poesia.
