= Bača (surname) =

Bača (feminine: Bačová) is a Czech and Slovak surname, meaning 'shepherd'. Notable people with the surname include:

- Jerguš Bača (born 1965), Slovak ice hockey player
- Juraj Bača (born 1977), Slovak canoeist
- Martin Bača (born 1985), Czech footballer

== See also ==
- Robert Baća, Croatian sculptor and painter
- Baca (surname)
