= Sonia Bacca =

Italian physicist

Sonia Bacca is an Italian physicist known for her calculations of the interaction forces of small systems of nucleic particles. She is University Professor in Theoretical Physics at the Institute for Nuclear Physics of the University of Mainz in Germany.

== Education and career ==
Bacca is originally from Italy, and completed a doctorate jointly between the University of Mainz and the University of Trento in Italy in 2005. After postdoctoral research at the GSI Helmholtz Centre for Heavy Ion Research she became a researcher at the TRIUMF particle accelerator in Vancouver, Canada, in 2008, also becoming an honorary lecturer at the University of British Columbia. She returned to Mainz as a professor in 2017.

== Recognition ==
Bacca was named a Fellow of the American Physical Society (APS) in 2019, after a nomination from the APS Topical Group on Few-Body Systems & Multiparticle Dynamics, "for first-principles calculations of the electromagnetic response of nuclei, leading to insights into the microscopic origin of the giant dipole resonance, nuclear polarizability corrections in muonic atoms, and the role of three-nucleon forces in electromagnetic reactions".
