= Robert Baća =

Croatian sculptor and painter

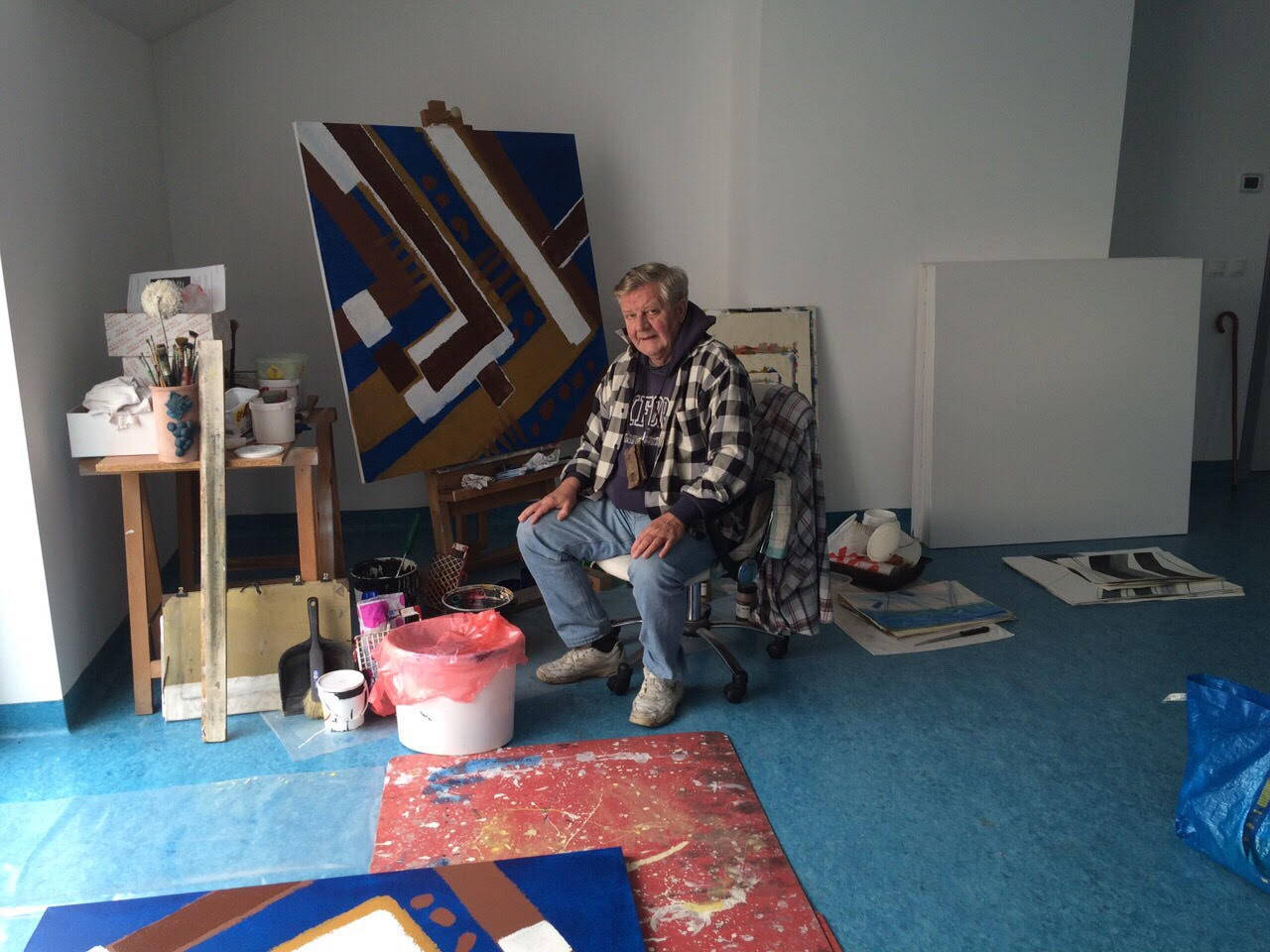
Robert Baća in his atelier in Zagreb.

Robert Baća (born 19 September 1949 – died 7 August 2019 in Zagreb, Croatia) was a Croatian sculptor and painter. Baća graduated from the academy in Zagreb in 1974. He was an assistant at the Antun Augustinčić masterworks. He worked in sculpture and abstract ceramics with associative nuances and accented dimensions. (Wood, 1971; Forest 1975). He also worked with coloured porcelain objects. He has exhibited his works in Zagreb, Samobor, Sesvete, Sisak, Zürich and Liechtenstein.

== Works ==
- 1967 – First collective exhibition at the School of Applied Arts in Zagreb
- 1969 – Graduated from the School of Applied Arts, Department of Ceramics, in the class of Prof. Slavko Barlović
- 1974 – Graduated sculpture at the Academy for Fine Arts in Zagreb, in the class of Prof. Ivan Sabolić. In the same year he became member of the Croatian Society of Visual Artists in Zagreb
- 1976 – Baća became member of the Croatian Association of Applied Arts and Croatian Artists' Community, and started work as an independent artist. For two years, he continued his professional training in the master workshop of the sculptor Prof. Antun Augustinčić in Zagreb
- 1978 – Completed postgraduate studies in sculpture in the master workshop of the sculptor Prof. Antun Augustinčić in Zagreb. Held his first one-man exhibition in Zagreb.
- 1985 – The Museum of Arts and Crafts in Zagreb purchased three of his porcelain sculptures for its permanent holdings.
- 1995 – Robert Baća is listed in the Encyclopedia of Croatian Art

== Bibliography ==
- Baričević, M. "Povijest moderne keramike u Hrvatskoj", Zagreb, 1986, page 121;
- Baričević, M. "Suvremena keramika u Hrvatskoj", Zagreb, 1994, pages 108–110;
- Baričević, M. "Enciklopedija hrvatske umjetnosti", Robert Baća, Zagreb, 1995, page 42
