= Alcobaça Monastery =

- Mosteiro de Alcobaça (Portuguese)
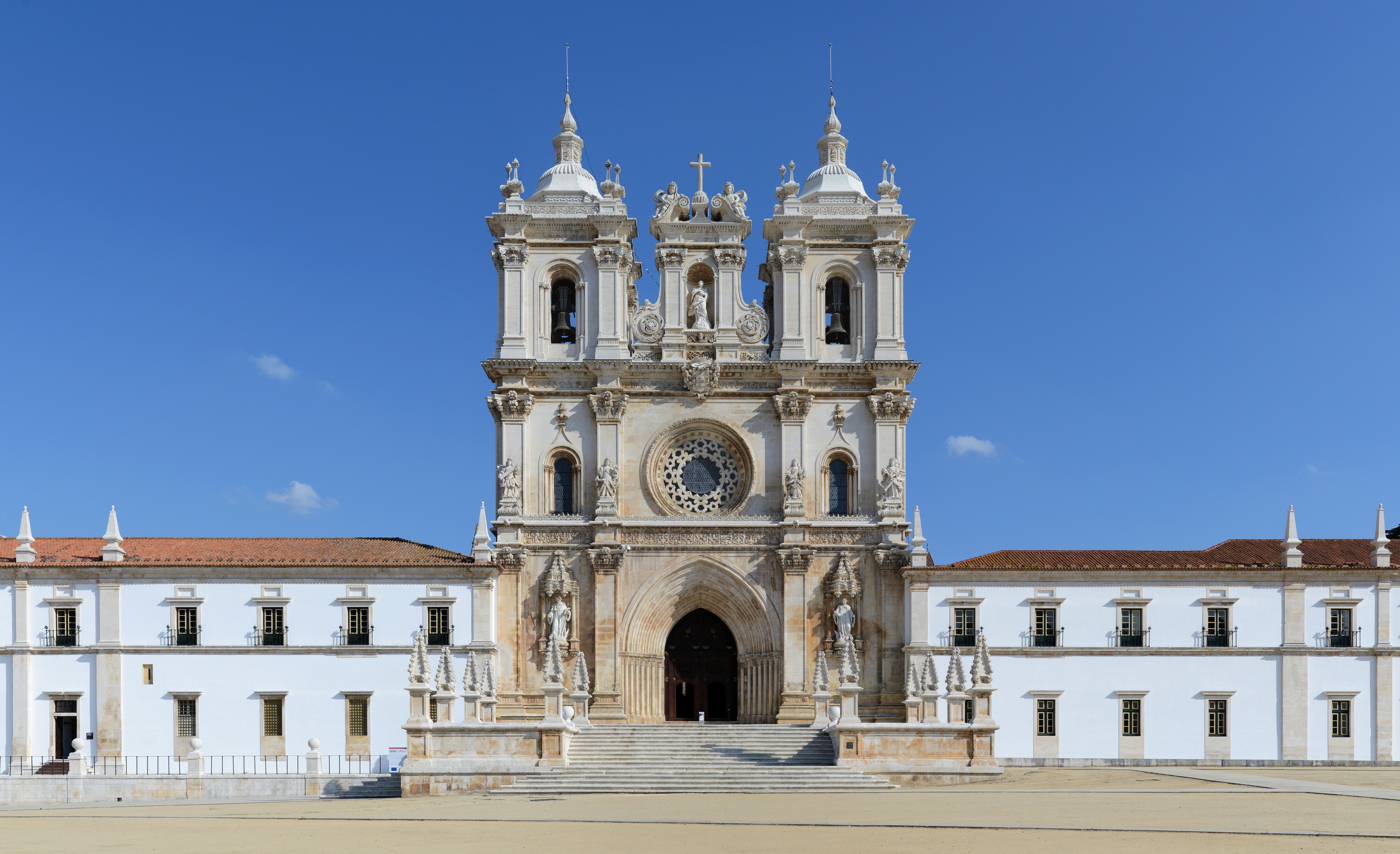
- Façade of the Monastery of Alcobaça. The portal and rose window of the church are original Gothic (early 13th century), while the towers are Baroque (18th century).
- Interactive map of Alcobaça Monastery
- 39°32′54″N 8°58′48″W
- Location: Alcobaça, Portugal

Site notes
- Area: Archdiocese of Lisbon
- Architectural styles: Romano-Gothic, Manueline, Mannerism, Baroque

UNESCO World Heritage Site
- Official name: Alcobaça Monastery
- Type: Cultural
- Criteria: i, iv
- Designated: 1989 (13th session)
- Reference no.: 505
- Region: Europe and North America

Portuguese National Monument
- Type: Non-movable
- Criteria: National Monument
- Designated: 10 January 1907
- Reference no.: IPA.00004719

The Alcobaça Monastery or Alcobasa Monastery (Portuguese: Mosteiro de Alcobaça, Mosteiro de Santa Maria de Alcobaça) is a Catholic monastic complex located in the town of Alcobaça (or Alcobasa, Portuguese pronunciation: [alkuˈβasɐ]), Oeste region of Portugal, 120 km (75 mi) north of Lisbon and 110 km (68 mi) south of Coimbra.

The monastery was established in 1153 by the first Portuguese king, Afonso Henriques, and would develop a close association with the Portuguese monarchy throughout its seven-century-long history. This association led to the monastery becoming the richest and most influential in Portugal by 1300, with a population of almost 1,000 monks and business interests including farming, fishing and trade. It closed in 1834, amid the dissolution of the monasteries in Portugal.

The church and monastery were the first Gothic buildings in Portugal, and, together with the roughly older Augustinian Monastery of Santa Cruz in Coimbra, it was one of the most important mediaeval monasteries in Portugal. Due to its artistic, cultural and historical relevance, it was included in UNESCO's World Heritage Site list in 1989.

== History ==
The Alcobaça Monastery is one of the first buildings associated with the Cistercian Order in Portugal. It was founded in 1153 as a gift from the first Portuguese king, Afonso I or Afonso Henriques (1112–1185), to Bernard of Clairvaux, following the king's conquest of the city of Santarém from the Moors in March 1147. The foundation of the monastery was part of a larger strategy by King Afonso I to assert his authority and promote the colonisation of lands recently conquered from the Moors during the Reconquista.

Construction began in 1178, some 25 years after the first Cistercian monks settled in the Alcobaça region. Initially, the monks lived in wooden houses and would only move to the newly built monastery in 1223. The church proper wasn't completed until 1252. The church and the adjacent monastery are the earliest examples of truly Gothic architecture in Portugal and the church itself was the largest in Portugal at the time of its completion. The final touch in this large medieval ensemble was given in the late 13th century, when King Denis ordered the construction of the Gothic cloister, also known as the Cloister of Silence.

The monks dedicated their lives to religious meditation, creating illuminated manuscripts in a scriptorium. The monks from the monastery produced an early authoritative history on Portugal in a series of books. The library at Alcobaça was one of the largest Portuguese medieval libraries, but was pillaged by the invading French in 1810, and many items were stolen in an anti-clerical riot in 1834, when the religious orders in Portugal were dissolved. The remnants of the monastery library, including hundreds of medieval manuscripts, are kept today in the Biblioteca Nacional de Portugal, Portugal's national library in Lisbon.

During the Middle Ages, the monastery quickly became a powerful and influential presence within the kingdom of Portugal. The monastery owned and developed extensive agriculture areas, and the abbot exerted influence over a large area. A public school was opened in 1269. The importance of the monastery can be measured by the fact that many monarchs were buried here in the 13th and 14th centuries. Kings Afonso II and Afonso III and their queens, Urraca of Castile and Beatrice of Castile, respectively, are buried here, as well as King Peter I and his mistress, Inês de Castro, who was murdered on the orders of Peter's father, King Afonso IV. After being crowned king, Peter commissioned two magnificent Gothic tombs for himself and his mistress, both of which can still be seen inside the monastery church.

During the reign of Manuel I, a second floor was added to the cloister and a new sacristy was built, following the characteristic Portuguese late Gothic style known as "Manueline". The monastery was further enlarged in the 18th century, with the addition of a new cloister and towers to the church, although the medieval structure was mostly preserved. In the Baroque period, the monks were famous for their clay sculptures, many of them are still inside the monastery. Elaborate tiles and altarpieces completed the decoration of the church.

The great 1755 Lisbon earthquake did not cause significant damage to the monastery, although part of the sacristy and some smaller buildings were destroyed. Far greater damage was caused by invading French troops in the first years of the 19th century during the Peninsular War, itself a part of the Napoleonic Wars. In addition to looting the library, they robbed the tombs and stole and burnt part of the inner decoration of the church. In 1834, with the dissolution of the monasteries in Portugal, the last monks left the monastery.

Alcobaça Monastery was classified as a National Monument on January 1, 1907, and included in the special protection zone on August 16, 1957.

== Art and architecture ==
Aerial view of the Alcobaça Monastery complex and the surrounding town of Alcobaça

The Alcobaça Monastery was built following an early Gothic style and represents the arrival of this style in Portugal. The church and other main buildings were constructed from 1178 until the end of the 13th century. The church was consecrated in 1252. Following the precepts of the Cistercian Order, the original monastic buildings were built along lean architectonic lines, without any decoration apart from some capital sculpture and a statue of the Virgin Mary.

=== Exterior ===

The main façade of the monastery has two plain-style wings with the church in the middle. The façade of the church is a mix of styles: the portal and the rose window above were part of the original church, while the statues and the two flanking towers were added in the beginning of the 18th century. The side walls of the church have crenellations and the apse has eight flying buttresses to support the weight of the vault of the apse, a typical feature of Gothic architecture.

=== Interior of the church ===
Nave of the abbey church, looking toward the chancel

Chancel of the abbey church

The first architect(s) of the church, most probably of French origin, followed the design of the Abbey of Clairvaux (now mostly demolished), which had been founded by Bernard of Clairvaux in 1115. The church is a Latin-cross building with pronounced transept arms and three aisles. The lateral aisles of the nave are as high (20 metres) as the central one, which together with the relative slenderness of the church (17 metres) and large length (106 metres) conveys an impression of monumentality. Alcobaça remains, after 800 years, the largest Portuguese church. The vertical emphasis observed in the building is a typical Gothic feature.

Columns and walls are devoid of decoration, as required in Cistercian churches, and the interior is very brightly illuminated by rows of windows on the walls and rose windows on the main façade and transept arms. The main chapel, like that of Clairvaux, is surrounded by a gallery (ambulatory) and has a series of radiating chapels. The aisles are covered by simple Gothic vaulting.

=== Royal tombs ===
Tomb of King Peter I

Tomb of Inês de Castro

Last Judgment on the end of Inês de Castro’s tomb

In the transept of the church are located the tombs of King Peter I and his mistress, Inês de Castro, who was assassinated in 1355 by order of Peter's father, King Afonso IV. After becoming king, Peter ordered the remains of his beloved to be transferred to her tomb in Alcobaça and, according to a popular legend, had her crowned as queen of Portugal and ordered court members to pay her homage by kissing her decomposing hand.

This pair of royal tombs in Alcobaça, of unknown authorship, are among the best works of Gothic sculpture in Portugal. The tombs are supported by lions, in the case of the king, and half-men half-beasts, in the case of Ines, and both carry the recumbent figures of the deceased assisted by a group of angels. The sides of Peter's tomb are magnificently decorated with reliefs showing scenes from Saint Bartholomew's life, as well as scenes from Peter and Ines' life. Her tomb is decorated with scenes from the life of Christ, including the Crucifixion and the Last Judgement.

=== Chapel of Saint Bernard ===
This chapel, located in the south side of the transept, has a sculptural group depicting the "Death of Saint Bernard", one of the best works authored by 17th-century Alcobaça monks. In both sides of the chapel are buried Kings Afonso II and Afonso III.

=== Royal Pantheon ===
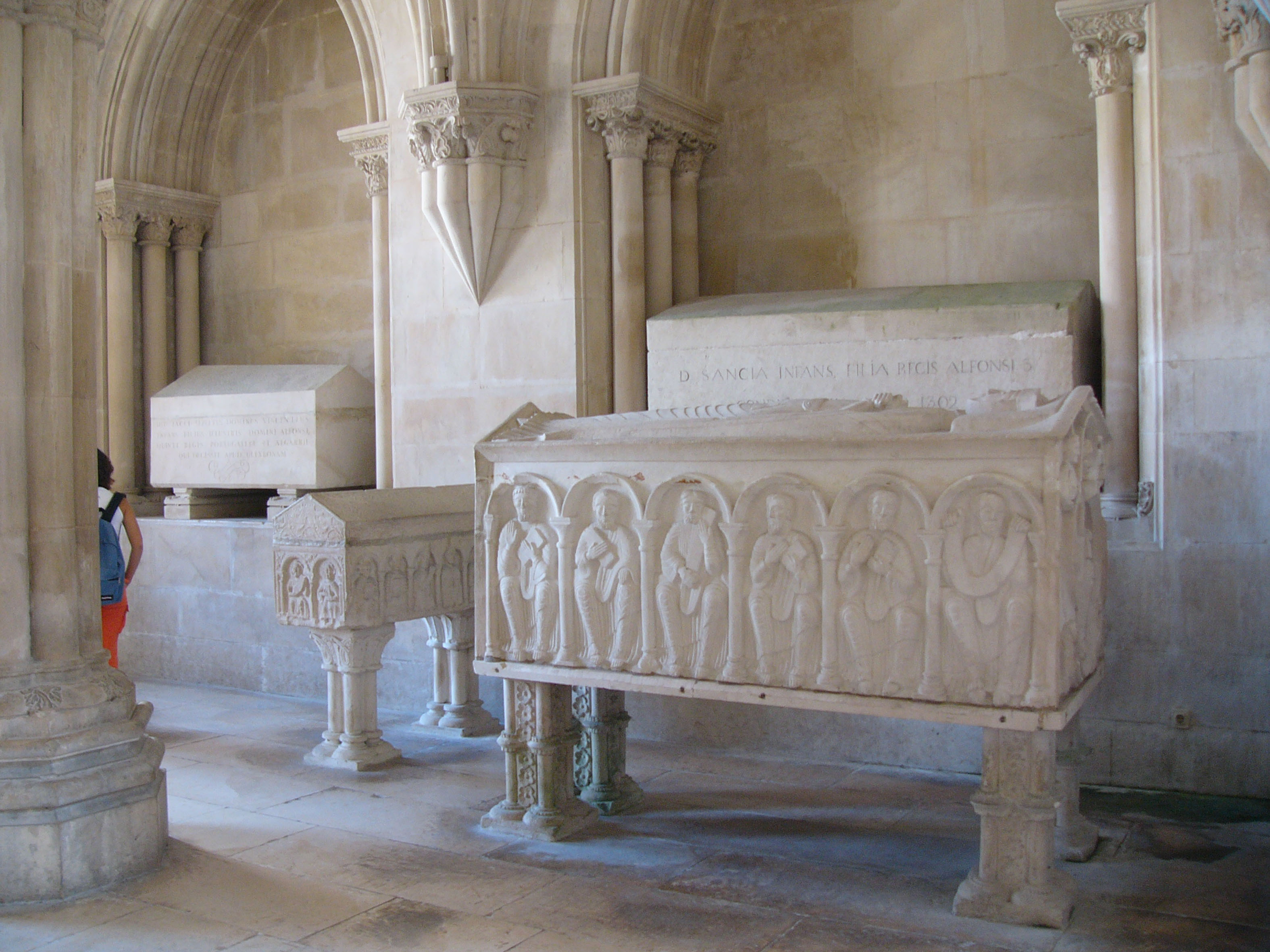
The Royal Pantheon with the tomb of Queen Urraca.

From the right arm of the transept, one reaches the Royal Pantheon, a room built in the end of the 18th century in neo-Gothic style, being the earliest Neo-Gothic architecture in Portugal.

The Royal Pantheon has the 13th-century tombs of two queens of Portugal, Urraca of Castile and Beatrix of Castile, married respectively to Kings Afonso II and Afonso III. There are smaller tombs of unidentified princes. The most remarkable tomb is that of Queen Urraca (died in 1220), buried in a richly decorated late Romanesque tomb. A relief showing the queen is seen over the tomb, and the sides are decorated with the Apostles under a round arched gallery. Other reliefs show the king, surrounded by their children, mourning the late queen, as well as Christ surrounded by a mandorla and the symbols of the four Evangelists. Other tombs are richly decorated with arabesques of Mudéjar-Romanesque style, as well as the Apostles.

=== Sacristy ===
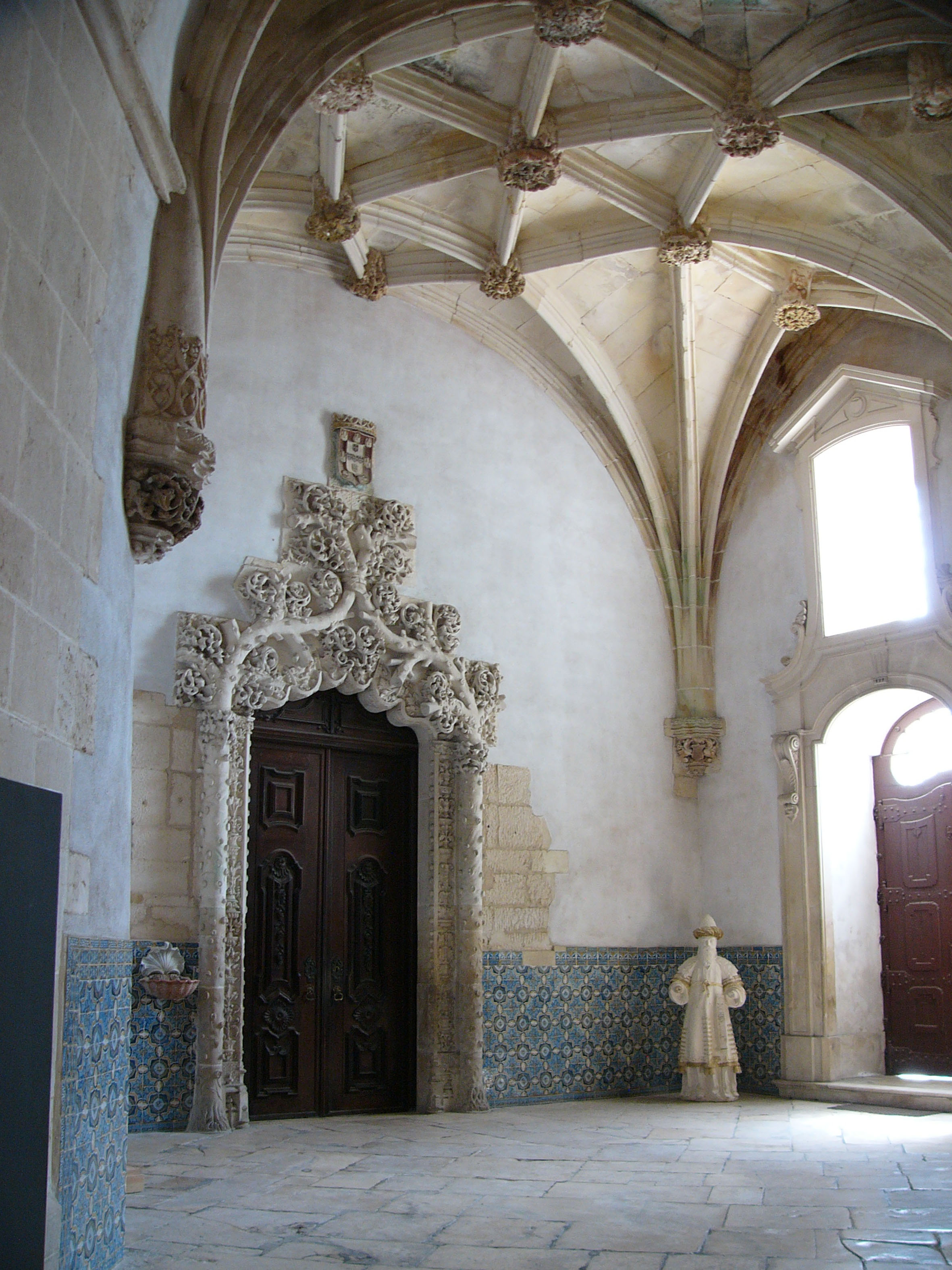
Manueline vault and entrance to the sacristy

From the ambulatory the sacristy of the church can be reached. The sacristy had been built in Manueline style in the early 16th century, but had to be rebuilt after the 1755 earthquake. The corridor leading to the sacristy, covered by a splendid Manueline rib vaulting, and the portal to the sacristy have survived the earthquake. The portal is a framed by intertwined vegetal branches that carry the coat-of-arms of Portugal.

=== Room of the Kings ===
Hall of Kings, with royal statues and azulejo panels

This room, located close to the entrance of the church, has a series of 17th–18th century statues representing the kings of Portugal. The walls are decorated with blue-white 18th century tiles that tell the history of the Monastery of Alcobaça, since its foundation by Afonso Henriques.

=== Dormitory ===
The dormitory is a large Gothic room where the monks slept together; only the abbot was allowed to have his own room. In the 16th century the space was divided into individual cells. In the 1930s the cell walls were demolished.

=== Refectory ===
Refectory

The refectory was the room in which the monks had their meals every day. While they ate, one of the monks read aloud passages of the Bible from a pulpit, which in Alcobaça is embedded into one of the walls. Access to the pulpit is through an arched gallery with a staircase. The pulpit is one of the most harmonious architectural structures of the monastery. Like the dormitory, the refectory has many pillars separating aisles and is covered by early gothic rib vaulting.

=== Claustro do Silêncio ===
The cloister of the monastery, known as the Claustro do Silêncio (Cloister of Silence), was built during the reign of King Denis, who sponsored its construction. It is one of the largest medieval Cistercian cloisters in Europe. Its columns feature capitals decorated with animal and vegetal motifs, designed by the Portuguese architect Domingos Domingues. The Gothic Fountain Hall contains an elegant early Renaissance water basin decorated with motifs including the coat of arms of the monastery. In the early 16th century, a second floor in the Manueline style was added, characterized by its typical twisted columns.

Cloister of D. Dinis, viewed from the second floor

Gargoyle overlooking the cloister

Lavabo in the cloister

Aerial view showing Claustro do Silêncio (top) and Claustro do Rachadouro (bottom)

=== Chapter House ===
Chapter house

This room, where the monks gathered to discuss the daily matters concerning the monastery, was the most important room after the church. Their daily gathering began by listening to the reading of a chapter from the Rule of St Benedict. The entrance to the house is through a Romanesque-style portal with two similar windows on each side. The room is now filled with Baroque statues created by the monks for the main chapel of the church.

=== Kitchen ===
The original kitchen was destroyed in the 17th century during the construction of the Afonso VI cloister, leaving only its Romanesque doorway intact. Located between the refectory and the monks' hall, the present kitchen was built and clad in azulejo tiles in the mid-18th century. It features an enormous central chimney supported by eight iron columns. At the rear, a stone basin was supplied with fresh water and live fish diverted directly from the River Alcoa through a specially built canal system.

Monumental chimney clad in azulejo tiles

The central hearth and eight iron columns supporting the monumental chimney

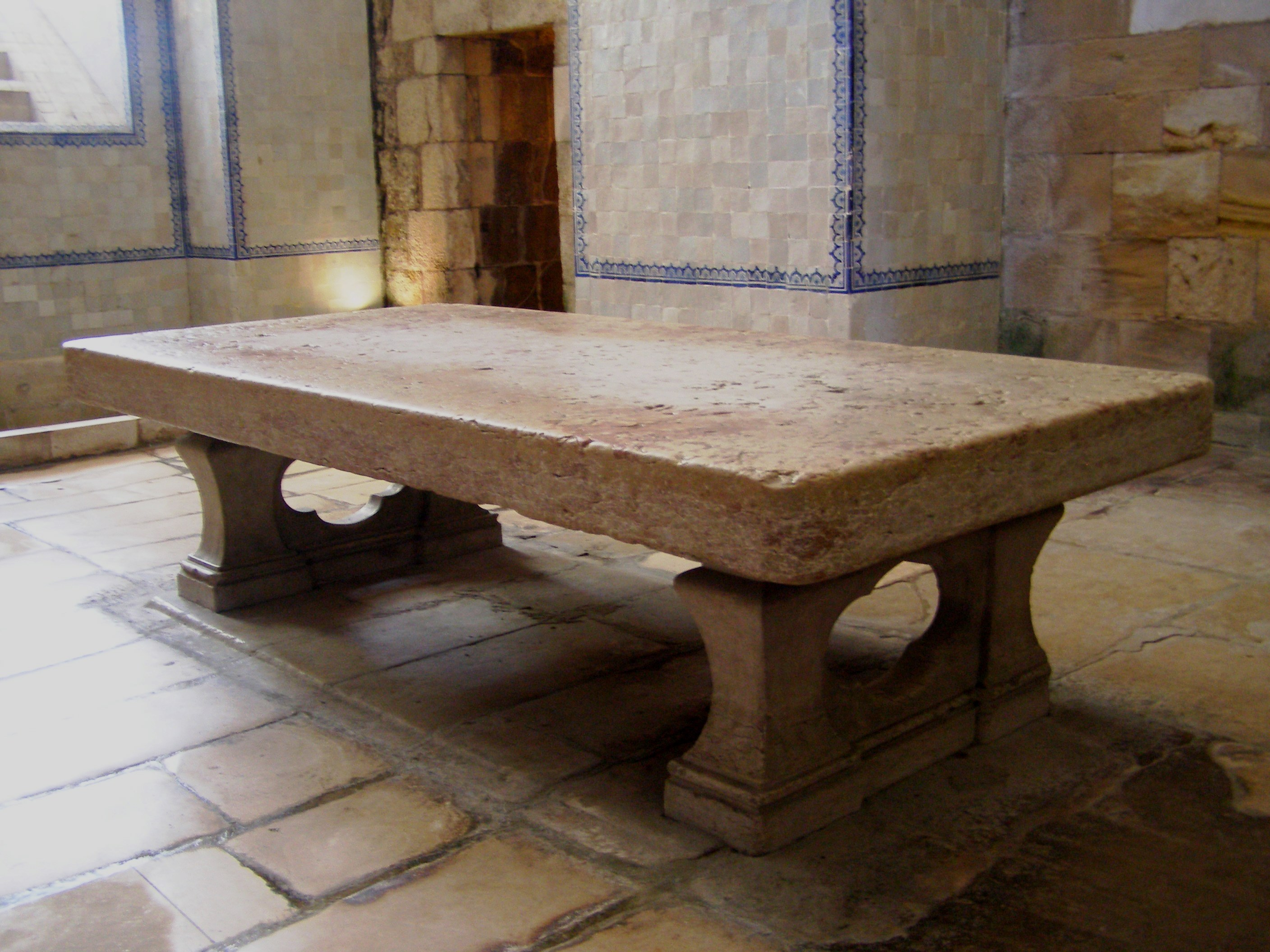
Massive stone preparation table in the center of the kitchen

A stone basin supplied with fresh water diverted from the Alcoa River, used for cleaning and keeping live fish

== See also ==
- Monastery of Batalha
- Monastery of Santa Cruz
- Alcobasa
- Azulejo
