= Baca (surname) =

Baca is a Spanish surname. Notable people with the surname include:

- Baca family of New Mexico
- Elfego Baca (1865–1945), American gunman, lawyer and politician
- Geovany Baca (born 1971), Honduran boxer
- Jimmy Santiago Baca (born 1952), American poet and writer
- Joe Baca (born 1947), American politician
- Joe Baca Jr. (born 1969), American politician
- José A. Baca (1876–1924), American politician
- Joseph F. Baca (born 1936), chief justice of the New Mexico Supreme Court
- Lee Baca (born 1942), American sheriff
- Mariano Prado Baca (1776–1837), Central American lawyer and politician
- Polly Baca (born 1941), American politician
- Rafael Baca (born 1989), Mexican footballer
- Susana Baca (born 1944), Peruvian singer

== See also ==
- Bača (surname)
- Bacca (surname)
