= Backa =

Backa may refer to:

- Bačka, a region of Vojvodina, Serbia
- Backa, Gothenburg, a suburb in Sweden
- Backë, a village in Albania

== See also ==
- Backa Theatre, Gothenburg, Sweden
- Back (disambiguation)
- Bačka (disambiguation)
- Bacca (disambiguation)
