= Alcoa River =

River in Portugal

Alcoa
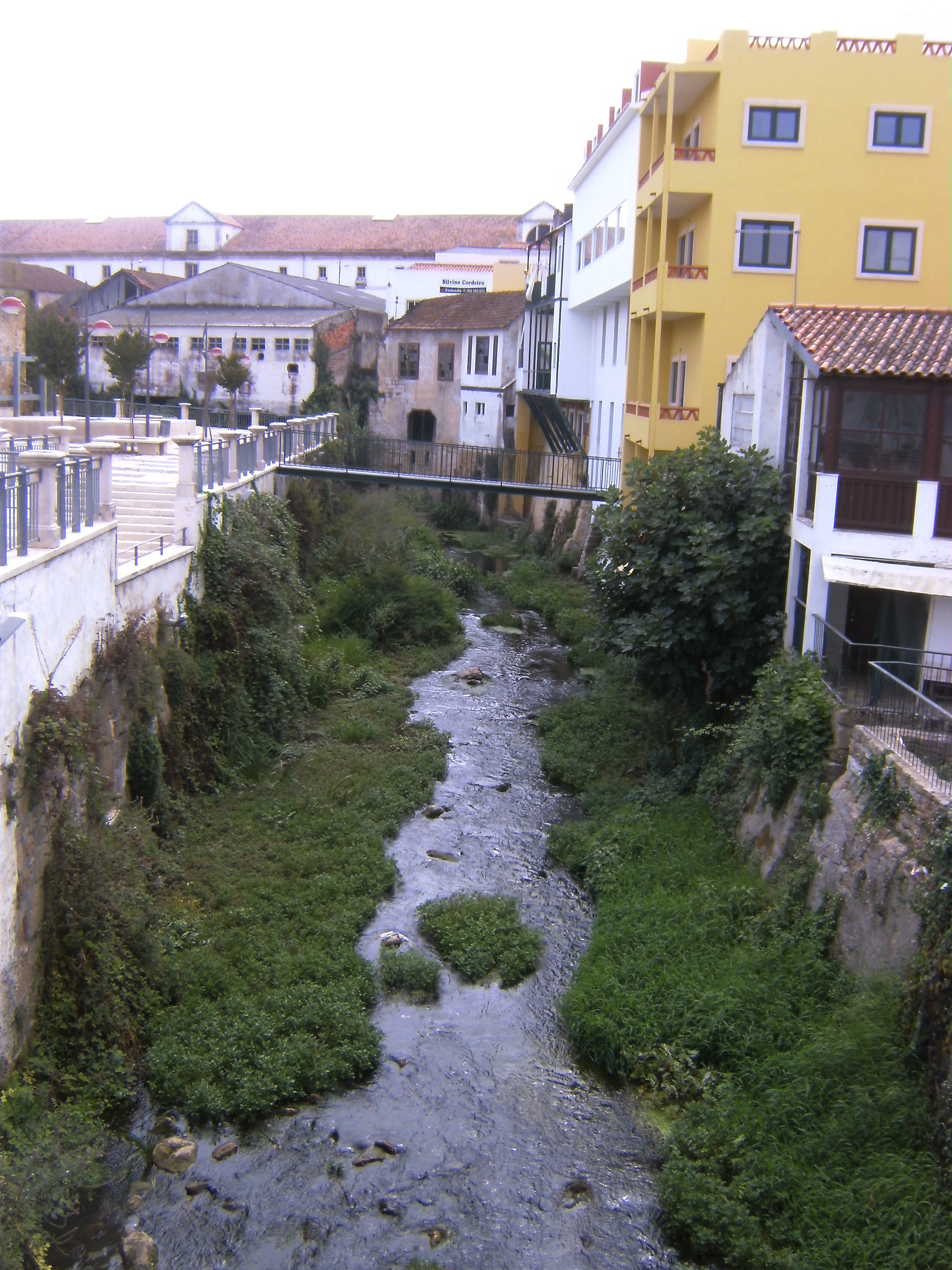
- The Alcoa in Alcobaça

Location
- Country: Portugal

Physical characteristics
- Mouth: Atlantic Ocean
  - location: Nazaré
  - coordinates: 39°34′49″N 9°05′05″W

Basin features
- Tributaries
  - left: Baça

The Alcoa (Portuguese pronunciation: [alˈkoɐ]) is a river of Portugal, flowing into the Atlantic Ocean. It rises in the municipality of Alcobaça and flows into the ocean near Nazaré. The river section below the confluence with its tributary Baça is also referred to as Alcobaça.
