= Oeste (intermunicipal community) =

Intermunicipal community in Portugal

Oeste West
- Intermunicipal community
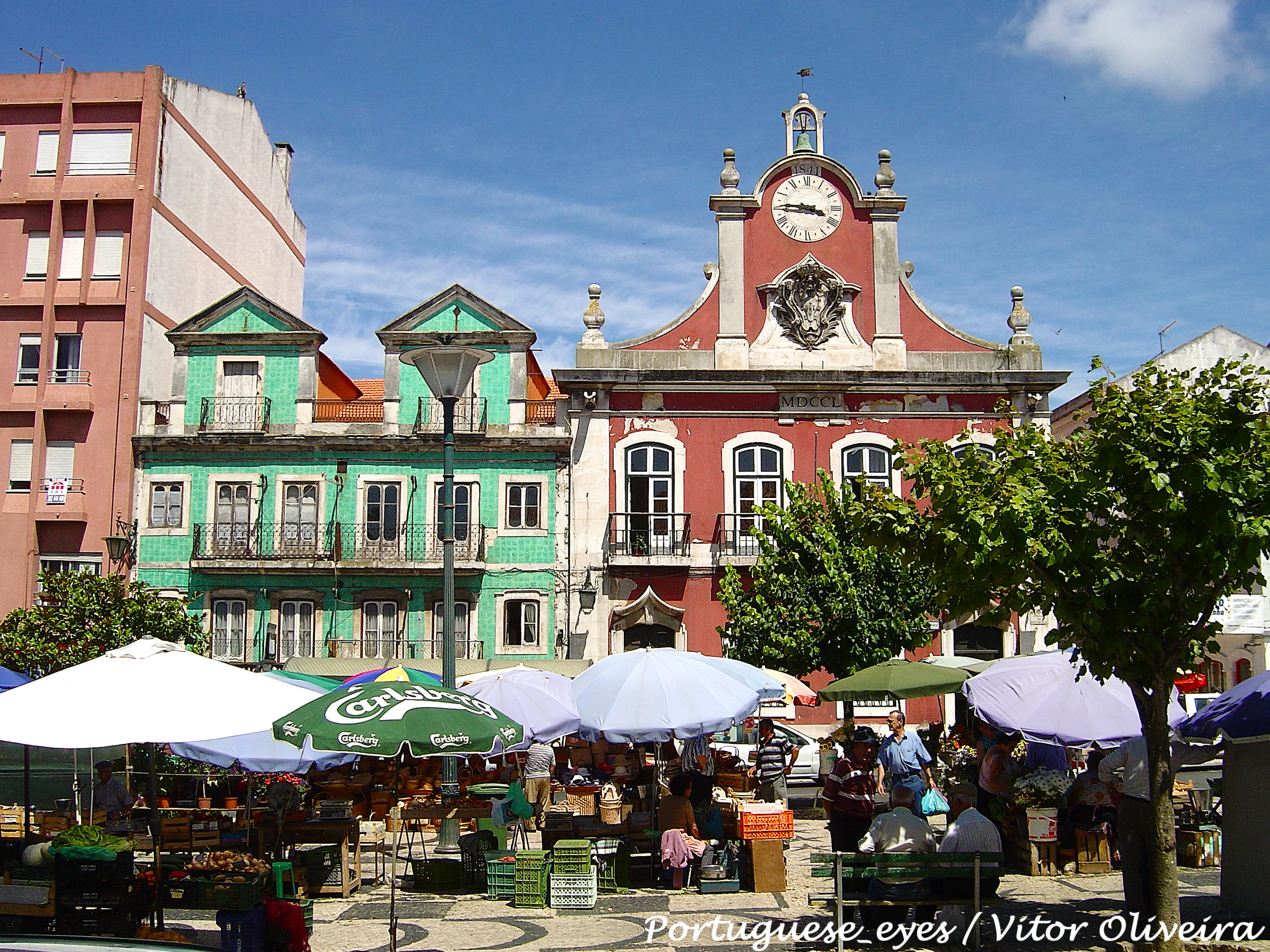
- Left to right, from top: Serra de Montejunto [pt] with typical regional windmills, Alcobaça Monastery, Fortified town of Óbidos, Oeste Vineyards (Torres Vedras); Praça da República (Caldas da Rainha), Sítio da Nazaré

- Brandmark

- Location of Oeste in Portugal (NUTS-2013 map)
- Interactive map of Oeste
- Coordinates: 39°24′N 9°08′W
- Country: Portugal
- Planning region: Lisbon and Tagus Valley
- Region: Oeste e Vale do Tejo
- Districts: Lisbon, Leiria
- Historical province: Estremadura
- Established: 25 November 2008
- Seat: Caldas da Rainha
- Largest mun.: Torres Vedras
- Municipalities: 12

Government
  - Type: Intermunicipal community (CIM)
  - Body: Council, Assembly, Executive Secretariat, Strategic Board
  - Council President (2025-29): Hermínio Rodrigues (PSD, Alcobaça)
  - Assembly President: Jorge Ferreira dos Santos (UTV - GCE/PSD/CDS-PP/VP, Torres Vedras)
  - First Secretary: Paulo Lopes Simões

Area
  - Total: 2,220.16 km^{2} (857.21 sq mi)
- Highest elevation (Alto de Montejunto): 666 m (2,185 ft)

Population (2021)
  - Total: 363,511
  - Density: 163.732/km^{2} (424.064/sq mi)
- Demonym: oestino
- Time zone: UTC+00:00 (WET)
  - Summer (DST): UTC+01:00 (WEST)
- EU NUTS code: PT1D1
- Website: www.oestecim.pt//

The Oeste (European Portuguese: [ɔˈɛʃtɨ]), also known as the West Region or by extension Western Portugal, is a cultural sub-region, intermunicipal community (CIM) and NUTS-3 statistical region in Portugal. Located within the country's Oeste e Vale do Tejo region, the population in 2021 was 363,511 in an area of 2,220.16 km^{2} (857.21 mi^{2}).

Located in the area between the Atlantic and the interior Estrela-Montejunto mountain system, the Oeste region is characterised by a coastal and rural influence and presents itself as one of the strongest non-provincial identites in the country. Effectively the part of Estremadura placed outside the Lisbon Metropolitan Area, it is one of the country's areas that has witnessed the most growth in recent decades, in part due to increasing suburbanisation from Lisbon and its improving accessibility which has allowed it to prosper. Caldas da Rainha serves as the seat of Oeste, with the most populous municipality being Torres Vedras.

Horticulture is particularly important to the region, which produces several notable products, namely the Rocha pear, the Alcobaça apple [pt], its vineyards as well as the Óbidos and Alcobaça sour cherry. Surfing, beaches, monumental heritage and geology make tourism an important economic activity in the region.

== Administrative history ==
The Oeste sub-region administratively traces its roots back to the Associação de Municípios do Oeste (Association of Municipalities of the West) in mid-1987. A year prior the territory had been a founding unit of the Portuguese NUTS map, albeit with a few differences for the time the most notable being the addition of Mafra, a traditional municipality of the region but that wasn't part of the organization. Originally inserted in the Lisbon and Tagus Valley region, this territorial unit which still serves the function of a planning region (CCDR) lost its NUTS II status in 2002, at which point the West was inserted in the Central Portugal region.

Following the creation of the legal concept of "community" in Portugal in 2003, the region instituted the Comunidade Urbana do Oeste (Urban Community of the West; abbreviated ComUrb Oeste) on 29 March 2004. At the time, its northern border was the source of discussion from a political point of view due to its relation with Leiria. The legislation specifically stated communities must be territorially continuous so when Alcobaça had moved to join the urban community in February 2004 and consequently Nazaré, surrounded by the previously mentioned territory, was forced to reluctantly join Oeste despite not having decided yet. This was seen as a major blow to Leiria, which under the 2003 legislation sought to form a more prestigious "greater metropolitan area" (GAM) but now did not meet the demographic minimums for such a status.

The ComUrb-CIM-GAM system was soon replaced with a new law establishing the framework for new intermunicipal communities and metropolitan areas was approved by the Assembly of the Republic on 27 August 2008. A few months later, on 25 November 2008, the Associação de Municípios do Oeste (Association of Municipalities of the West), with the approval of the respective municipal assemblies of each of its constituent municipalities, converted itself into the Comunidade Intermunicipal do Oeste. With the new legislation, CIM Oeste would also absorb the functions of the former local GATs (Technical Support Offices), after they had been extinguished in October of the same year by the central government - the region had been home to two offices, which were based out of the main regional cities, Caldas da Rainha and Torres Vedras.

The law updating the framework and formally establishing the names, borders, and duties of both the intermunicipal communities and metropolitan areas was approved by the Assembly of the Republic on 12 September 2013, in the context of a larger administrative reorganization and the new map would be used for institutional reorganization of several local public services and organizations. The European statistics units were therefore also later updated to reflect the new framework, basing the new NUTS-2013 map and those going forward on the communities (Art.139º). Under this new map, Mafra would leave the statistical region in favour of the Lisbon metropolitan area, where it was already an active member, making the NUTS and CIM coterminous.

In 2024, together with Médio Tejo and Lezíria do Tejo, Oeste formed a new NUTS II region, Oeste e Vale do Tejo, subsequently matching the borders for most of the national government's regional operations. Exceptions still exist however, with one example being the Regional Tourism Entities (ERTs) organised post-2013 and remain untouched as of 2026.

== Municipalities ==
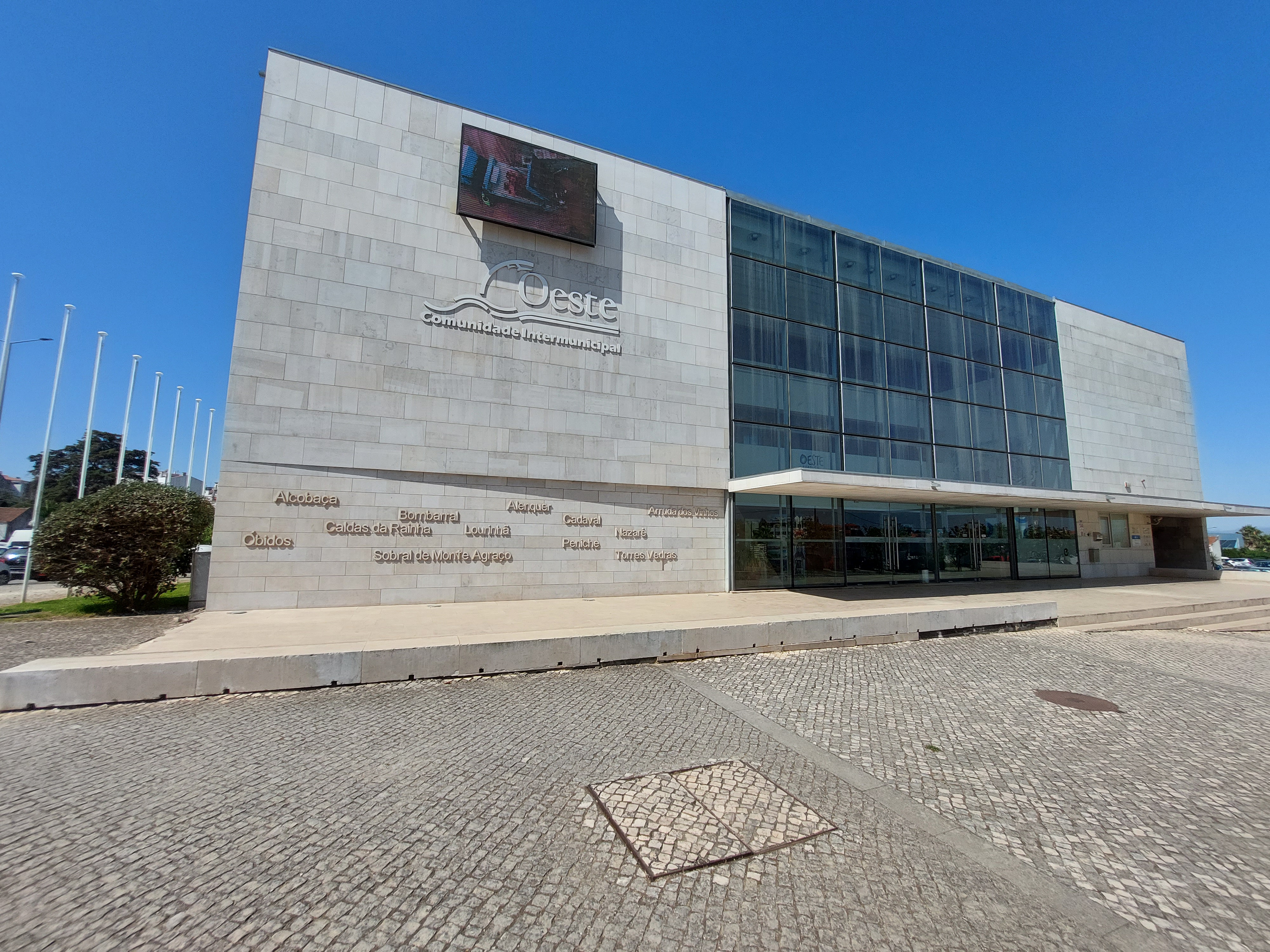
The purpose-built CIM Oeste headquarters in Caldas da Rainha featuring the organization's original logo.

Comunidade Intermunicipal do Oeste is made up of twelve municipalities:

Municipality	Population (2011)	Area (km^{2})
Alcobaça	54,965	408.14
Alenquer	44,442	304.22
Arruda dos Vinhos	13,992	77.96
Bombarral	12,746	91.29
Cadaval	13,372	174.89
Caldas da Rainha	50,910	255.69
Lourinhã	26,240	147.17
Nazaré	14,881	82.43
Óbidos	11,992	141.55
Peniche	26,429	77.55
Sobral de Monte Agraço	10,540	52.10
Torres Vedras	83,072	407.15
Total	362,540	2,220.16
