= Maria da Graça =

Maria da Graça may refer to:

Places

- Maria da Graça, Rio de Janeiro, a neighborhood of Rio de Janeiro, Brazil
- Maria da Graça Station, a stop on the Rio de Janeiro Metro

People

- Maria da Graça Amado da Cunha (1919–2001), Portuguese concert pianist, feminist and anti-fascist
- Maria da Graça Andrada (born 1932), Portuguese medical researcher
- Maria da Graça Carvalho (born 1955), Portuguese politician
- Maria da Graça Freire (1916–1993), Portuguese writer
- Maria da Graça Meneghel (born 1963), Brazilian entertainer Xuxa
- Maria da Graça (1919–1995), Portuguese actress, see O Pátio das Cantigas
