= Secretariado Nacional de Informação =

The Secretariado Nacional de Informação, Cultura Popular e Turismo (National Information, Popular Culture and Tourism Secretariat), usually known as the Secretariado Nacional de Informação or SNI, was the public organization responsible for political propaganda, public information, communications, tourism and cultural activity during the Estado Novo regime in Portugal.

It was based out of the Palácio Foz, on Restauradores Square, in Lisbon.

The SNI developed an important role in the area of fine arts, film, theater, dance, literature (including the introduction of literary prizes), folklore, publishing, etc.

The organization was created in 1933, as the Secretariado de Propaganda Nacional (SPN; Secretariat of National Propaganda), adopting the SNI designation in 1945. In 1968, it became the Secretaria de Estado da Informação e Turismo (SEIT; State Secretariat of Information and Tourism).

After April 25, 1974, with the Carnation Revolution, the SNI/SEIT's information and communications operations formed the basis for the new Secretaria de Estado da Comunicação Social (State Secretariat of Social Communication), sometimes elevated as the Ministry of Communications.

== Directors ==
=== Directors of the SPN ===
- António Joaquim Tavares Ferro – 1933 to 1945

=== National Secretaries of the SNI ===
- António Joaquim Tavares Ferro – 1945 to 1950
- António de Eça de Queirós – 1950 (interim)
- José Manuel da Costa – 1950 to 1955
- Eduardo Brazão – 1955 to 1958
- César Henrique Moreira Baptista – 1958 to 1968

=== Secretaries of State for Information and Tourism ===
- César Henrique Moreira Baptista – 1968 to 1973
- Pedro Mourão de Mendonça Corte-Real da Silva Pinto – 1973 to April 25, 1974

== Prizes ==
The secretariat issued various prizes in the theater world, some symbolic and some monetary. The SPN (and, after a hiatus, the SNI) gave out the Prémio Gil Vicente between 1935 and 1962, with the exception of the years 1943, 1946–1953, 1957, 1959, and 1960.

The SNI also awarded prized for musical theater (from 1945 to 1948), followed by the Artistic Awards (1959–1973), as well as other prizes for literary efforts.

=== Prémio Gil Vicente (1935–1962) ===
Year	Author(s)	Piece
1935	Vasco de Mendonça Alves	O Meu Amor É Traiçoeiro
1936	Alfredo Cortez	Tá Mar
1937	Carlos Selvagem	Telmo, o Aventureiro
1938	Virgínia Vitorino	Camaradas
1939	Vasco de Mendonça Alves	Pátria
1940	Olga Alves	Guerra Tempos modernos
1941	Carlos Selvagem	A Encruzilhada
1942	Armando Vieira Pinto	Coristas
1944	Joaquim Paço d’Arcos	O Ausente
1945	Eduardo Schwalbach	As Duas Máscaras
1954	Almeida Amaral, Fernando Santos and Leitão de Barros	Prémio Nobel
1955	No information	
1956	No information	
1958	Costa Ferreira	Um Dia de Vida
1961	Francisco Ventura	Auto de Justiça
1962	Ângelo César	Eva e Madalena

=== Prémio Maria Amália Vaz de Carvalho (for children's literature; 1937–1961) ===
Year	Author
1937	Adolfo Simões Muller
1938	Maria Archer
1939	Olavo D'Eça Leal
1942	Adolfo Simões Muller
1943	Olavo D'Eça Leal
1944	José de Lemos
1945	Salomé de Almeida
1946	Isaura Correia Santos
1947	José de Lemos
1948	Aurora Constança
1952	Aurora Constança
1953	Maria Cecília Correia
1954	Maria Elisa Nery de Oliveira
1957	Maurício Queirós
1958	Ricardo Alberty
1961	Isabel Maria Vaz Raposo

=== Prémio Antero Quental (poetry; 1934–1961) ===
Year	Author	Work
1934	Vasco Reis (pseudonym of Manuel Reis Ventura)	A Romaria
1935	Carlos Queirós	Desaparecido
1936	Joaquim Azinhal Abelho	Confidências de um Rapaz Provinciano
1937	Ramiro Guedes de Campos	Portugal: Poemas
1938	Miguel Trigueiros	Resgate
1939	Pedro Homem de Mello	Segredo
1941	Américo Cortez Pinto	A alma e o Deserto
1942	Campos de Figueiredo	Navio na Montanha
1943	João Cabral do Nascimento	Cancioneiro
1945	Amândio César	Batuque de Guerra
1946	Maria Teresa Andrade Santos	
1947	Natércia Freire	Rio Infindável
1948	Ribeiro Dias	
1949	António Manuel Couto Viana	
1950	António Sousa Freitas	
1952	Natércia Freire	
1953	Armando César Côrtes-Rodrigues	Abriu-se a Noite
1954	João Maia	
1956	Carlos Lobo de Oliveira	
1957	Maria Madalena Monteiro Ferin	
1958	Ruy Cinatti	
1959	António Manuel Couto Viana	
1960	Fernando Guedes	A viagem de Ícaro

=== Prémio Ocidente (prose/poetry; 1962–1964) ===
Year	Author(s)
1962	Francisco Caeiro, Francisco da Cunha Leão
1963	Torcato de Sousa Soares, Mário António
1964	Cruz Pontes, Pedro Homem de Melo

=== Prémio Fialho de Almeida (short story or novella; 1936–1954) ===
Year	Author(s)
1936	Luís Forjaz Trigueiros
1938	Raquel Bastos
1940	Loureiro Botas
1942	Joaquim Paço d'Arcos
1944	Folgado da Silveira
1946	Heloísa Cid
1948	Olavo d'Eça Leal
1948	Manuela de Azevedo

=== Prémio Eça de Queirós (novel; 1935–1960) ===
Year	Author(s)
1935	Conde de Aurora
1936	Joaquim Paço d'Arcos
1944	Francisco Costa
1948	Tomás de Figueiredo
1954	Agustina Bessa-Luís, Alberto Lopes
1958	Maria da Graça Freire
1960	Ester de Lemos
