= Nadir Afonso artworks =

This is a list of Nadir Afonso artworks: paintings, engravings, and architecture.

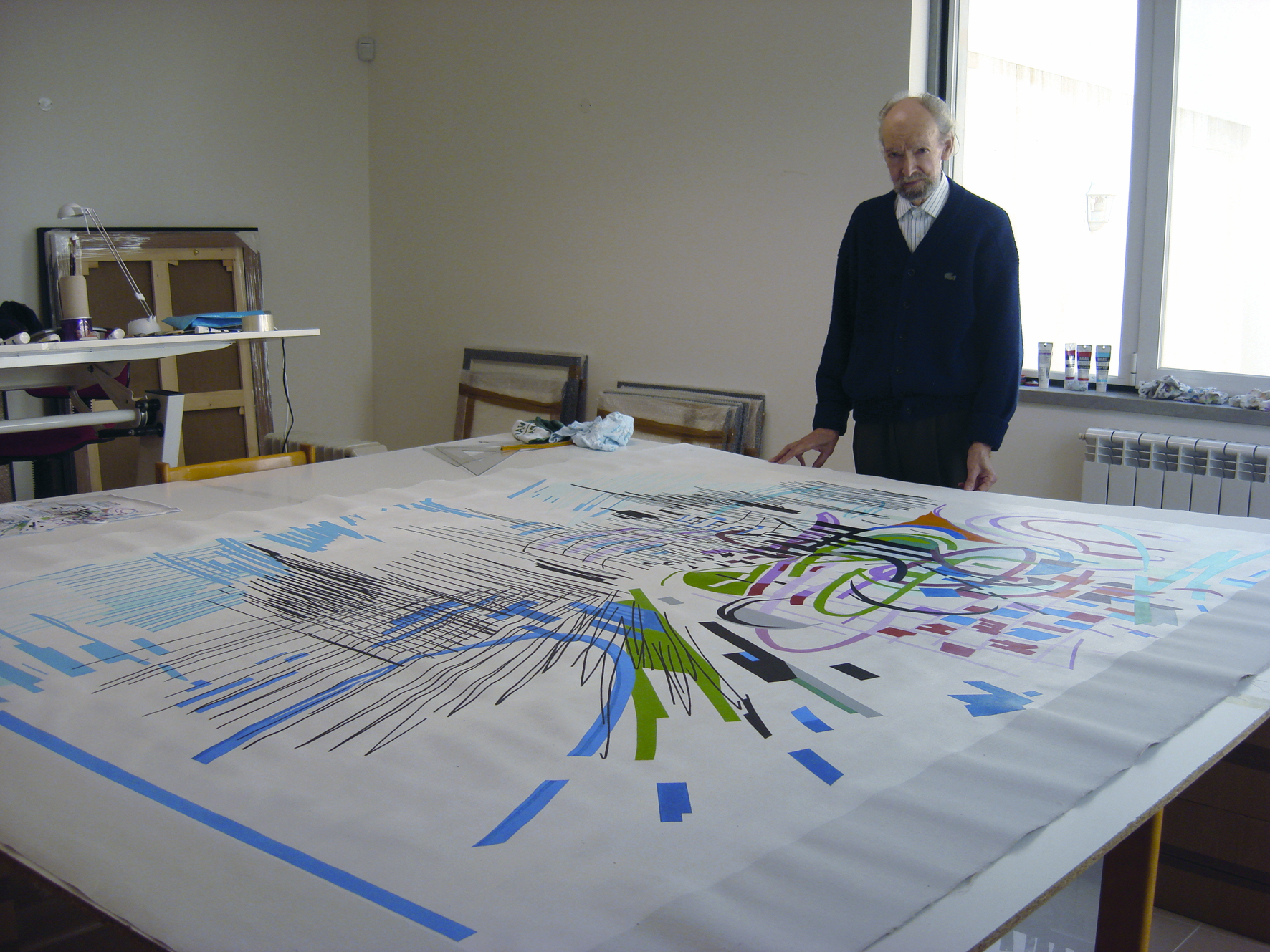
Nadir Afonso in his studio, standing next to Seville (first decade of 21st century [2007], Cities series), canvas still unmounted.

All data was sourced from websites (linked to) and from the books and catalogues listed in the main Nadir Afonso article.

== Paintings ==
Titles are shown in their original language as conceived by the artist, and translated if needed, except the titles made of place names, which are shown in the English form. Multiple-source inconsistencies are shown in the Notes column. The artist's method usually involves one or more studies before the final artwork, which sometimes is revealed only years later; the artist also sometimes returns to work on artworks after they are publicly exhibited. This explains some of the multiple or alternative dates.

=== Early works ===
Date	Title	Image	Description	Notes
1935	Rua da Cadeia (Jail Street)			
1936	Rio Cávado (Cávado River)		oil on canvas, 32x30 cm	collection Nadir Afonso Foundation
1936	Campinas (Fields)	1	oil on canvas, 23x34	alt. date 1937; collection Nadir Afonso Foundation
1936	Canto do Rio (River Corner)			
1937	Forte de S. Francisco (Fort St. Francis)		watercolor	2nd prize, national contest "Which is the most beautiful Portuguese landscape?"
1938	Arredores (Surroundings)	1	oil on canvas, 37x31 cm	alt. date 1936; collection Nadir Afonso Foundation
1939	Cais da Ribeira			study
1939	Gaia		mixed technique	alt. title Gaia I
1940	Porto		mixed technique	motif: boats on a river dock
1941	Douro no Porto (Douro in Porto)			alt. title Douro
1941	Clérigos	1 2 3	mixed technique	
1941	Modelos (Models)			
1941	Cavalos Alados (Winged Horses)			study
1943	Praça dos Aliados (Aliados Square)	2		
1945	Évora		oil	not related to the 1945 oil Évora Surrealista

=== Expressionism ===
Date	Title	Image	Description	Notes
1939	Cerâmica de Chaves (Chaves Ceramic Factory)	1		
1939	Ponte D. Luís I (King Luis I Bridge)	1	oil	based on a 1939 study
1939	Self-Portrait			ripped apart and thrown away by the artist, found and restored
1939	Gaia II			
1940	Banhistas (Bathing Women)			not related to the 1947-89 oil on canvas As Banhistas
1940	Praça da Batalha (Batalha Square)	1	oil	
1940	A Mulher e o Galo (The Woman and the Rooster)			
1937-41	A Bruxa de Escarei (The Witch of Escarei)			
1941	A Fuga de Lot (Lot's Escape)			
1942	Ribeira (Riverside)	1	oil	
1942	Vila Nova de Gaia	1	oil on hardboard, 53x50 cm	alt. not dated; based on the 1940 studies Gaia, Vila Nova de Gaia, and Vila Nova de Gaia II
1942	A Sebastianista (Sebastianist Woman)			study
1942	Ponte de Lima			
1942	Margens do Cávado (Margins of the Cávado)	1 (right)		study
1943	Cais em Massarelos (Quay in Massarelos)			
1944	Evocação (Homage)			study
1944	Figura Sentada (Seated Figure)			study
1945	Alvito			
1946	La Ville d'Avry (The Town of Avry)		gouache, 21x31.5 cm	
	Colinas de Gondomar (Hills of Gondomar)		watercolor	
1946	Place du Châtelet (Châtelet Square)			not related to the 1958 painting Châtelet
1946	O Poeta (The Poet)			study
1946	Luxembourg			
1946	Place de la Concorde (Concorde Square)			
1946	Pontes de Paris (Bridges of Paris)			not related to the 1947 painting of the same title (but same subject) nor to the 1977 oil on canvas Les Ponts de Paris
1946	Ponte de Austerlitz (Austerlitz Bridge)			
1946	Banlieu (Outskirts)			
1946	O Sena (The Seine)			
1946	Chômage (Unemployment)			
1946	Margens do Tâmega (Margins of the Tâmega)			study
1947	Sur la Plage (On the Beach)			
1947	Pontes de Paris (Bridges of Paris)			not related to the 1947 painting of the same title (but same subject) nor to the 1977 oil on canvas Les Ponts de Paris
1947	A Ópera (The Opera)			not related to the 1947 painting L'Opéra nor to the 1983 painting Opéra
1947	L'Opéra (The Opera)			not related to the 1947 painting A Ópera nor to the 1983 painting Opéra
1947	Pont et Rue du Bac (Bridge and Bac Street)			
1947	A Mexicana (Mexican Woman)			study
1947	Tâmega	1		
1947	Agrela			
1947	Entardecer em Valdanta (Limelight in Valdanta)	1		study
1947	Orléans			study
1948	Pont de Saint Michel (St. Michel Bridge)			
1948	Barcos no Cais (Boats in the Quay)			study
1948	La Marne			dated 47; study
1948	Lake Vincennes			
1948	Le Rhône à Lyon (The Rhône at Lyon)			
1948	Saudade (Nostalgia)			
1948	Casas de Lisieux (Houses in Lisieux)			study
1948	Zeus			study
1949	Ruas de Paris (Streets of Paris)			study
1949	Vera Cruz			not related to the first decade of 21st century acrylic on canvas of the same title
1949	Catedral de Gand (Gand Cathedral)			
1949	Les Ponts (The Bridges)			
1949	Moscow			not related to the 1995 painting of the same title
1949	O Amor (Love)			
1950	Calvão	1 (left)		
1950	Vienna			not related to the painting of the same title
1950	Île-de-France			
1950	La Saône à Lyon (The Saône at Lyon)			study
1951	Chamonix			
1951	Florence			
1951	As Margens do Capibaribe (The Margins of the Capibaribe)			study
1951	Represa do Agapito (Agapito Dam)			study
1952	Catedral II (Cathedral II)			
1953	Margens (Margins)	1 (left)		legend: "Margens do Mar Cáspio" (Margins of the Caspian Sea); study
1953	Pontevedra			
1953	Praia de Aveiro (Beach in Aveiro)			
1953	La Marne à St. Dizier (The Marne at St. Dizier)			
1954	La Rhône (The Rhône)			
1954	Catedral IV (Cathedral IV)			
1956	Caramulo			
1956	Amsterdam			not related to the 1994 painting of the same title
1957	Fábricas de Charenton (Factories of Charenton)			study
1951-59	Cathédrale Bleue (Blue Cathedral)			
1959	Luxembourg Gardens			
1959	Tuileries Palace			
	Casas de Mytilene (Houses of Mytilene)			study
1962	Vale de Salém (Salem Valley)			study
1963	Nature			
1947-67	Codeçais	1 (right)		dated 47; study
1968	Restos de Escuna (Remains of a Schooner)			
			21x23,5 cm	auctioned on June 14, 2007, by Leiloeira Invicta (Porto, Portugal), base price: €4,000; motif: two women, one of which pregnant, pre-surreal style

=== Surreal period ===
Date	Title	Image	Description	Notes
1945	Évora Surrealista (Surreal Évora)	2 3	oil	alt. title Évora; alt. date 1944-01; based on a study; collection Nadir de Afonso Foundation
1946	Metamorfose Artificial (Artificial Metamorphosis)		oil on canvas, 74x70 cm	collection Nadir Afonso Foundation
1954	Musas (Muses)			
1947-87	Jeunes Filles (Young Girls)			not related to the 1991 painting of the same title
1950-88	Psyché			
2007	Apolo (Apollo)	1:gouache 2:gouache 3:gouache 4:gouache/detail 5:gouache/detail 6:exhibition (left)	acrylic on canvas, 200x230 cm	one of five oversized paintings by this artist; based on a 2007 gouache on paper, 28.5x34 cm; both collection Nadir Afonso Foundation

=== Iris period ===
Date	Title	Image	Description	Notes
1943	Metalocromia (Metalochrome)			
1946	No Title		oil on canvas, 75x75 cm	motif; curls over green and red background; rainbow on top right
1946	Composição	1		alt. title Composição Irisada (Iris Composition), not related to the 1946 oil on canvas Composição Irisada
1946	Composição Irisada (Iris Composition)	2 3	oil on canvas, 97x97 cm	alt. not dated; alt. title Composição, not related to the 1946 painting Composição; collection Nadir Afonso Foundation
1947	Os Metais (The Metals)			
1951	Pisa I			study
1951	Pisa II			study
1951	San Marco			study
1956	Monte Branco (Mont Blanc)			
1956	Les Alpes (The Alps)			
1948-98	Máquina (Machine)	1 2		
1998	Fundo dos Oceanos - Expo 98 (Ocean's Deep - Expo '98)	1		
	Íris (Iris)	1	gouache on paper, 40x50 cm	based on a 1958 gouache study; not related to the 2000 acrylic on canvas of the same title
	Asas (Wings)	1		based on the 1964 painting Composition Irisée (Iris Composition), which was based on the 1948-49 (alt. date 1948) painting Asas (alt. title Composition Irisée)

=== Espacillimité series ===
All paintings in this series are independent of each other, despite their common titles.

Date	Title	Image	Description	Notes
1954	Espacillimité	2		
1956	Espacillimité Animé de Mouvement (Espacillimité Animated with Movement)	1 2	canvas on rotating drum	pictured at the 1958 Salon des Réalités Nouvelles, Paris
1957	Espacillimité		oil on canvas, 82x152 cm	exhibited at the 1961 São Paulo Art Biennial; 2007 sale price (Antiks Design gallery, Lisbon, Portugal): €65,000
1958	Espacillimité	1 2		alt. title Espacilimitado
	Espacillimité	1		
	Espacillimité	1		
	Espacillimité	1		

=== Baroque period ===
Date	Title	Image	Description	Notes
1954	Auriculo			
1954	Lotus			study
1954	Les Spirales	1	oil on hardboard, 67.5x86 cm	
1954	Composition	1		
1955	Audible II			
1955	Caractères	1 2 3	oil on canvas, 70,4x90 cm	collection of Ana de Carvalho Alves, auctioned on May 9, 2007, by Palácio do Correio Velho (Lisbon, Portugal), sold at base price: €30,000
1955	Caractères		oil on canvas, 94x115 cm	reproduction of the same year's oil on canvas of the same title; collection Nadir Afonso Foundation
1956	Flora	1 2		alt. date 1953
1992	Espirais (Spirals)			reproduction of the 1954 oil on hardboard Les Spirales

=== Brazil period ===
Date	Title	Image	Description	Notes
1947	Geometrias	1		
1948	Morfometrias (Morphometries)			
1948	Thot	1		based on a study
1951	Formas Pré-Geométricas (Pre-Geometric Shapes)	1		based on two 1951 studies; alt. date 1961

=== Egyptian period ===
Date	Title	Image	Description	Notes
1945		1	drawing	motif: woman in profile
1950	Le Roi (The King)			
1950	Friso do Falcão (Frieze of the Hawk)			
1951	Friso de Fayoum (Frieze of Al Fayyum)		gouache, 28x37.5 cm	
1951	O Relevo de Karnak (The Relief of Karnak)		oil on canvas, 66x97 cm	
1951	Le Dieu Rá (King Ra)			
1952	Deux Styles	2		
1952	Áspide (Aspid)	1		
1952	Friso de Ápis (Frieze of Apis)			
1952	Rencontre (Meeting)			
1952	Nefertite (Nefertiti)			study
1952	Orla Negra (Black Rim)			based on a study; alt. date 1953
1953	Horus	1 2	oil on canvas, 95.5x135 cm	not related to the 1954 painting Hórus; collection Nadir Afonso Foundation (alt. Calouste Gulbenkian Foundation)
1953	Vestales (Vestals)			study
1953	Serpente (Serpent)			study
1953	Engrenagem (Gears)		gouache, 27x40 cm	based on, or the basis for, the painting of the same year and title
1953	Engrenagem (Gears)			based on, or the basis for, the painting of the same year and title
1953	Mycènes			
1954	Friso de Mênfis (Frieze of Memphis)		gouache, 15x30.5 cm	
1954	Hórus (Horus)			not related to the 1953 painting Horus
1954	Beni Hassan			
1954	Frise des Coqs (Frieze of the Roosters)			
1954	Lis (Fleur-de-lis)			study
1954	Friso de Ísis (Frieze of Isis)	1	mixed technique, 64x100 cm	auctioned on October 23, 2007, by Palácio do Correio Velho (Lisbon, Portugal), estimate: €25-30,000
1955	Nubia			
1955	Friso de Ámon (Frieze of Amon)	1	gouache, 20x41 cm	based on a 1953 study
1955	Géométrie Animée (Animated Geometry)			
1955	Roulement (Bearing)			
1955-56	Friso de Ísis (Frieze of Isis)			study; based on the 1955-56 study of the same title (different color scheme)
1956	Osíris (Osiris)			
1956	Offrande (Offering)			
1957	Círculos (Circles)	1		
1957	Rotações (Rotations)			study
1957	Policromia (Polychromy)			
1957	Pré-Geometrias (Pre-Geometries)			
1958	Frisos (Friezes)			study
1958	Arcos			study
1981	Período Egípcio (Egyptian Period)		acrylic on canvas, 68x98 cm	
1958-89	Hieróglifos (Hieroglyphs)		gouache, 25x39.5 cm	alt. date 1958

=== Geometry ===
Date	Title	Image	Description	Notes
1951	Contrastes (Contrasts)			dated 48-89; study
1952	Desintegração Geométrica (Geometric Disintegration)			
1955	Les Billes (The Marbles)			
1959	Ensembles			study
1961	Príncipes (Princes)			study
1962	Cabeleira de Berenice (Berenice's Hair)			legend "Brahms 62"; study
1965	Perspective I		oil on canvas, 88x115 cm	alt. date 1968
1965	Perspective II		oil on canvas, 88x115 cm	
1965	Perspective III			
1965	Projections I			study; based on the 1961 gouache Projections, 19.5x29.5 cm
1968	Projections II			study
1963-85	Papillon (Butterfly)			
1971	Rosácea (Compass Rose)			
1958-89	Origens Geométricas (Geometric Origins)		gouache, 34x29 cm	based on, or the evolution of, a 1958 study
not dated	Geometrias (Geometries)		oil on canvas, 95x132 cm	collection Nadir Afonso Foundation
not dated	Composição Geométrica (Geometric Composition)		oil on canvas, 94.5x131 cm	collection Nadir Afonso Foundation
	Dispersão Geométrica (Geometric Dispersion)	1	gouache on paper, 38.5x57 cm	based on a 1958-68 study

=== Cities series ===
Date	Title	Image	Description	Notes
1949	Cais do Sena (Quay in the Seine)			study
1951	Argel			
1952	Buenos Aires			
1953	Zaratustra (Zarathustra)			based on a study
1954	Calcutta			based on a study
1954	Espirais (Spirals)			not related to the 1954 oil on hardboard of the same title
1954	Oder			study; not related to the 1962 study of the same title
1954	Madrid			study; not related to the 1994 gouache, the 1995 painting, and the gouache on paper, all of the same title
1955	Notre-Dame			
1955	Copacabana	1		
1956	Ariana			study
1956	Trenton			study, not related to the 1977 painting of the same title
1957	Sofia			
1957	Corbigny			
1957	Halba			based on a study
1958	Châtelet			not related to the 1946 painting Place du Châtelet
1959	Devant le Spectre de Dieu (In Front of God's Spectre)		gouache, 28.5x46 cm	
1960	Buçaco			
1960	Palácio das Descobertas (Palace of the Discoveries)			dated 46
1960	Cabedelo			study
1960s	Os Portugueses (The Portuguese)	1 2		
1961	Tempo (Time)			
1956	Venice	2 3		alt. date 1956-62; collection CAMJAP-Centro de Arte Moderna José de Azeredo Perdigão/Calouste Gulbenkian Foundation (alt. Nadir Afonso Foundation)
1957-62	Édipo e Seu Pai (Oedipus and His Father)			signed "Oedipus et son père 57"; study
1962	Oder			study; not related to the 1954 study of the same title
1962	Pont d'Auteil (Auteil Bridge)		gouache on paper, 23x35 cm	2007 sale price (São Mamede gallery): €18,000
1962	No Title	1	gouache on paper, 22x33.5 cm	collection of Ana de Carvalho Alves, auctioned on May 8, 2007, by Palácio do Correio Velho (Lisbon, Portugal), sold at base price: €6,000
1962	Galáxias (Galaxies)			dated 89
1962	Marcoule	1 2 3	oil on canvas, 68x98 cm	collection Berardo
1963	Quatre Couleurs (Four Colors)		gouache, 22x30 cm	
1963	Alep			
1964	Fulvia			study
1964	Mitilene			study
1965	Ario			study
1965	Banjul		acrylic on canvas, 85x125 cm	date most probably wrong due to style, type of paint; 2007 exhibition price (António Prates gallery, Lisbon, Portugal): €55,000
1966	Palais (Palace)			
1967	Terras de Bornes			
1969	Réveil (Awakening)			
1969	Centre Industriel (Industrial Centre)			
1969	Pittsburgh	1/paid subscription required	gouache on paper, 33x37 cm	auctioned on March 21, 2002
1969	Rue de La Fayette			study
1969	Rue de Rennes			study
1968-70	Silices		oil on canvas, 93x127 cm	alt. date 1968
1970	Acropole Nucléaire (Nuclear Akropolis)			alt. date 1970-83
1970	Place Barroque			
1970	Figueira da Foz	1 2/paid subscription required	oil on canvas, 75x100 cm	auctioned on November 23, 1991, by Neumeister Kunstauktionen (lot 240), and again on November 4, 1992
1970	Canal de l'Oure (Oure Channel)		oil on canvas, 87x107 cm	
1970	The Hague			study
1970s	Les Ponts de Leninegrad (The Bridges of Leningrad)	1 2		
1970	Niteroi			
1970	Canal de l'Ourcq (Ourcq Channel)			
1968-71	Nouveaux Espaces (New Spaces)			
1971	Pittsburgh			alt. date 1961; could be connected to the 1969 gouache of the same title
1971	Cabo Ruivo	1	oil on canvas, 88.5x36 cm	auctioned on November 23, 1991, by Neumeister Kunstauktionen (lot 239); not related to the 1980 painting of the same title
1971	Brussels	1 2 3 4		
1972	Trinité			not related to the 1979 painting of the same title
1972	Honeleur			
1972	Heliopolis			
1972	Douro	1 2 3		
1972	Cais de Hamburgo (Quay in Hamburg)			study
1972	Catedral de Tours (Tours Cathedral)			
1968-73	Labyrinthe			
1973	Cavaleiros (Horse Riders)			study
1973	Herinya			study
1974	Centre		gouache, 22x31 cm	
1974	Margens do Tormes (Margins of the Tormes)			study
1975	Babylon			alt. dates 1968 and 1968–74; not related to the 1977 painting Nouvelle Babylone
1975	Carrefour (Crossroads)			
1975	Le Village	1	oil on canvas, 76x113 cm	based on the 1966 painting Village; auctioned on November 26, 2007, by Cabral Moncada Leilões (Lisbon, Portugal), estimate €30,000-45,000, not sold
1975	Porto Rico (Puerto Rico)			
1975	Le Port de Copenhague (The Port of Copenhagen)	2		alt. date 1975-85
1975	Oise à Compiègne (Oise at Compiègne)			study
1975	Oberland			study
1975	Oakland			study
1976	Le Lac (The Lake)			
1976	La Marne			
1976	Nuit de Printemps (Springtime Night)			alt. title Nuits de Printemps (Springtime Nights)
1976	Pyrenées			
1976	Rio			alt. date 1986; not related to the 1994 painting Rio de Janeiro nor to the 1997 painting of the same title
1976	Rio Negro			dated 76; alt. date 1976-80
1976	Mexico			
1976	Hartfort			study
1976	New York			study; not related to the 1995 painting of the same title
1977	Nouvelle Babylone (New Babylon)			not related to the 1975 painting Babylone
1977	S. Paulo			
1977	Les Ponts de Paris (The Bridges of Paris)	1 2	oil on canvas, approx. 69x110 cm	based on a 1976 gouache on paper; not related to the 1946 and 1947 paintings Pontes de Paris
1977	Champs Transparents (Transparent Fields)			alt. title Champ Transparent (Transparent Field)
1977	Centre Urbain (Urban Centre)			alt. date 1969-77
1977	Las Palmas II			alt. date 1977-82
1977	Trenton			not related to the 1956 study of the same title
1977	New Canaan			
1962-78	Fontainebleau			
1968-78	Place de la Gare			alt. date 1978
1978	Stockholm		oil on canvas, 89x125 cm	alt. date 1978-85
1978	Palaces			
1978	Travessa do Gaveto			alt. date 1969-78
1971-78	L'Aurore des Villes (The Dawn of the Cities)			alt. title L'Europe des Villes (The Europe of the Cities)
1978	La Terre (The Land, or Earth)	1:La Terre 2:Ocidente	gouache on paper, 24.5x35 cm	based on the 1966 gouache on paper Ocidente (Occident, alt. title Terra), 22x33 cm, on display at António Prates Foundation, Ponte de Sor, Portugal
1978	Le Pont de Bronze (The Bronze Bridge)		gouache, 25x39 cm	
1978	La Ville de Chaves (The City of Chaves)	1		alt. titles Chaves and Cidade de Chaves
1978	Brooken-Bad			study
1979	Trinité			not related to the 1972 painting of the same title
1979	La Lumière des Champs (The Light of the Fields)			
1979	Luxor	1	oil on canvas, 75.5x114.5 cm	
1979	Ravena			
1979	Les Gorgones (The Gorgons)		gouache, 29.5x43 cm	
1979	Antwerp			not related to the 1991 painting of the same title
1979	Peregrina (Pilgrim)			study
1949-80	Jamaica			dated 49
1966-80	Rue Chappe (Chappe Street)			
1978-80	Leningrad			alt. date 1978
1980	La Ruhr			
1980	Cabo Ruivo			not related to the 1971 oil on canvas
1980	Sacuarema			
1980	Montagne Sainte-Victoire (Sainte-Victoire Mountain)			not related to the non-dated Montanha Sainte-Victoire and the 1965-98 painting A Montanha de Santa Vitória
1980	La Forêt			
1980	Arbres Mexicaines (Mexican Trees)			
1980	Paysage Mexicain (Mexican Landscape)			
1980	Le Bois (The Forest)			
1980	Reflet de Feuillage (Reflex of Foliage)			
1980	La Ville des Mammouths (City of Mammoths)			alt. date 1962-80
1980	Metropole			not related to the 1982 painting of the same title
1980	Capiparibe			
1980	L'Automne à Garches (Autumn in Garches)			
1980	Le Quai (The Quay)			
1980	Pyrros (Pyrrhus)		gouache, 28.5x39.5 cm	based on the 1976 study Pirro
1980	Ao Fundo Ruínas de Palmira (In the Distance, Ruins of Palmyra)			
1980	Phrygia			study
1960-81	Moyen Âge (Middle Ages)			
1961-81	Siena			dated 61
1981	Vue de Cristalis (View of Cristalis)			not related to the 1983 painting Cristalis
1981	Les Confins (The Borders)			alt. dates 1981-84 and 1980–84
1981	Os Portugueses (The Portuguese)			based on the 1960s painting of the same title
1981	Serpenti			
1981	Göteborg		gouache, 23.5x40 cm	
1981	Crimea			study
1981	Pérouse			study
1981	Le Matin (The Morning)			
1982	L'Ancien Centre (The Old Centre)			
1982	Manège			alt. date 1984
1982	Porte Lilas (Lilas Gate)			
1982	Metropole			not related to the 1980 painting of the same title
1982	Tallinn			
1982	Victoria			
1976-83	La Lumière du Prisme (The Light of the Prism)			dated, and alt. date, 68-82
1983	Cristalis	1		based on a study; not related to the 1981 painting Vue de Cristalis
1983	Opéra			alt. title L'Opéra (The Opéra); not related to the 1947 painting L'Opéra
1983	Lenda do Norte (Northern Legend)			
1983	Brooklyn			
1983	Guadalquivir			
1984	Pompey			
1984	Oslo			
1984	Montreal			
1985	Helsinki			
1985	Taghily		oil on canvas, 80x120 cm	
1985	Riga			
1985	Dvina		oil on canvas, 90.5x121 cm	
1985	Praça de Oslo (Oslo Square)			study
1985	Olympia			
1985	San Francisco			
1985	Zagreb			
1985	Ninive			
1985	Great Fall			
1985	Luxembourg			
1985	Vatican			
1985	Dresden			
1985	Argos II		oil on canvas, 86x126.5 cm	
1985	Neuilly			
1985	Pélerinage (Pilgrimage)		gouache, 28x37.5 cm	
1985	Jardins de Gebel (Gardens of Gebel)			
1985	Chicago			study; not related to the gouache on paper nor to another painting, both of the same title
1985	Gudvagen			
1986	Herminia (Herminie)		oil on canvas, 72x116 cm	
1986	Campos de Tirana (Fields of Tirana)		oil on canvas, 79x116 cm	alt. date 1985
1986	Skira			
1986	Plaza de Cordoba			
1986	Pesaro		oil on canvas, 80x117 cm	alt. date 1985
1986	As Pontes de Siracusa (The Bridges of Syracuse)		oil on canvas, 80.5x119 cm	dated 86; alt. dates 1979, 1998
1986	L'Opéra	1 2 3	oil on canvas, 88.5x123 cm	based on the 1983 painting Opéra
1986	Philadelphia		oil on canvas, 93x116 cm	based on a study
1986	Tijuca			
1986	Verona			
1986	Alcazar			
1987	Dresden	2	oil on canvas, 78.5x118 cm	based on the 1985 painting of the same title
1987	Plaza del Sol	1 2 3 4	oil on canvas, 86.5x118.5 cm	reproduction of a 1985 study
1987	Tarare			
1987	Okayama			study
1987	Geodésias (Geodesics)			
1948-88	Andromaque			
1988	A Cidade dos Galos (The City of Roosters)	1 2		dated 88; alt. date 1989
1988	Envol (Flight)			alt. date 1989
1988	Odessa			
1988	Lourdes			
1988	A Dança de Orbe (The Orbe Dance)			
1988	Vaduz			
1988	Ressorts (Springs)			not related to the 1989 painting of the same title
1952-89	Ninfómana (Nymphomaniac)			dated 48-88
1965-89	Le Grand Canal			based on, or the evolution of, a 1965 painting of the same title
1989	Leipzig			
1989	Os Degredados (The Exiled)	1 2 3		dated 89; alt. date 1988
1989	Ressorts (Springs)		oil on canvas, 97x136.5 cm	not related to the 1988 painting of the same title
1989	Les Grands Amours (The Great Loves)		oil on canvas, 105x107 cm	
1989	Essor	1		
1989	Antropomorfose (Anthropomorphosis)		oil on canvas, 90x117 cm	dated 89; alt. date 1986
1989	Phenix (Phoenix)			
1989	Bangkok			dated 70-89
1989	Ponte de Angra (Angra Bridge)			dated 88
1952-90	Encontros (Meetings)		gouache, 25x39 cm	
1962-90	Le Retour d'Ulysse (The Return of Ulysses)		gouache, 27.5x39 cm	
1990	Ivry		gouache, 24x39.5 cm	
1990	Praia de Istambul (Beach of Istanbul)		oil on canvas, 97x116 cm	based on a 1989 (alt. date 1983) study
1990	Festa de Nanquim (Nanking Festivity)			
1990	Baía			
1990	Fúria (Fury)			based on a 1948-89 (dated 88) study
1990	Kenai		oil on canvas, 90x126 cm	
1990s	Sapporo	1	gouache on paper, 38.5x57 cm	study for the oil on canvas of the same title
1990s	Aahrus	1		
not dated (1990s)	Catedrais Góticas (Gothic Cathedrals)	1 2 3	acrylic on canvas, 96x129.5 cm	collection Nadir Afonso Foundation
1952-91	Penélope		oil on canvas, 100x111 cm	based on a 1952-88 (dated 51-87) painting of the same title
1960-91	Parma		oil on canvas, 95.5x136 cm	reproduction of the 1969 gouache of the same title, 22.5x32.5 cm; collection Nadir Afonso Foundation
1988-91	Sphinx		oil on canvas, 95x109 cm	
1991	Ponte de Agra (Agra Bridge)			
1991	As Princesas (The Princesses)			not related to the 1998 painting of the same title
1991	Sorcellerie (Wizardry)		oil on canvas, 108x114 cm	dated 89; alt. date 1986
1991	Modena	1	oil on canvas, 84x126 cm	alt. dimensions 85x126 cm; auctioned on November 28, 2006, by Palácio do Correio Velho (Lisbon, Portugal), base price €20,000, sold for €26,000
1991	Les Oiseaux (The Birds)		gouache, 24x38.5 cm	
1991	Nak-Graal			
1991	Olimpíadas (Olympic Games)		oil on canvas, 86x116 cm	
1991	Seville	1	oil on canvas, 81x121 cm	alt. size 85x122 cm; based on a 1980 study; not related to the non-dated gouache on paper and 2007 acrylic on canvas of the same title
1991	Rotterdam		oil on canvas, 87x118 cm	alt. dimensions 89x119 cm
1991	Vilnius			
1991	Santiago			
1991	Antwerp			not related to the 1979 painting of the same title
1992	Immeubles de Pantin (Pantin Buildings)			reproduction of the 1990s painting of the same title (or vice versa)
1992	Les Immeubles de Pantin (The Buildings of Pantin)	1		based on a 1964 study
1992	Germania			based on a 1983 study
1994	Les Portes de Capri (The Gates of Capri)			based on a 1992 gouache, 29x37 cm; alt. title Porte de Capri
1992	Arhus			based on a 1961 study
1992	Per Agris		gouache, 29x46 cm	
1992	La Contrée (The Town)		gouache, 26x40 cm	
1952-93	Espectros (Spectres)		gouache, 24x43 cm	
1993	Massy		gouache, 24x30 cm	based on a 1966 study
1994	Rome			
1994	Lisbon			
1994	Haarlem			
1994	Berlin		gouache, 23x35 cm	
1994	Les Filles de Thèbes (The Girls of Thebes)		gouache, 19.5x29 cm	
1994	Rio de Janeiro	1		not related to the 1976 and 1997 paintings Rio
1994	Avis Rara			
1994	Madrid		gouache, 23x34.5 cm	not related to the 1954 study, the 1995 painting, and the gouache on paper, all of the same title
1994	Ilíada (Iliad)		gouache, 17,5x30 cm	
1994	Indianapolis		gouache, 26x35 cm	not related to the 1995 gouache of the same title
1994	Amsterdam			not related to the 1956 painting of the same title
1994	Zaragoza	1		
1994	Les Pythagoriciens (The Pythagoreans)			
1994	Praça de Moscovo (Moscow Square)			
1995	Paris			reproduced on a tile panel in 1998; not related to the 1996 painting of the same title
1995	Noerdlingen			based on a 1969 study
1995	Candy			
1995	Berlin			reproduction of the 1994 painting of the same title
1995	Moscow	2		reproduced on a tile panel in 1998; not related to the 1949 painting of the same title
1995	Usines de Glasgow (Factories of Glasgow)		oil on canvas, 90x124 cm	
1995	Ciganos (Gypsies)			
1995	L'Émancipation des Femmes (The Emancipation of Women)	1	oil on canvas, 89.5x127.5 cm	
1995	Indianapolis		gouache, 26x36 cm	based on a 1995 study; not related to the 1994 gouache of the same title
1995	Madrid	1 2		alt. date 1997; reproduced on a tile panel in 1998; not related to the 1954 study, the 1994 gouache, and the gouache on paper, all of the same title
1995	New York	1		not related to the 1976 study of the same title; reproduced on a tile panel in 1998
1995	Iceland			
1995	Munich			not related to the not-dated acrylic on canvas of the same title
1995	Novogorod			
1995	Tunis			
1995	Oviedo	1		
1995	Salem			not related to the first decade of 21st century acrylic on canvas of the same title
1995	London	1		
1996	Parque de S. Paulo	1 2 3	acrylic on canvas	
1996	Jardin de Meudon (Meudon Garden)			
1996	London	1		based on the 1995 painting of the same title
1996	Paris			not related to the 1995 painting of the same title
1996	Ville Peri			
1996	Les Borgias			
1996	Liverpool		oil on canvas, 90x120.5 cm	reproduction of a 1983 gouache study, 24.5x34.5 cm; alt. date 1994
1996	Girassóis (Sunflowers)			based on the 1978 study Les Tournesols
1996	Les Filles de Venise (The Girls of Venice)	1	oil on canvas, 98.5x110 cm	based on a 1951-1988 (alt. date 1988) study
1996	Prague			
1996	Essen			
1996	Thessaly			based on a 1978 study
1996	Toledo	1		based on a 1965 study
1996	Porto Alegre			not related to the 1999 serigraph of the same title
1996	Rennes		oil on canvas, 81.5x125.5 cm	based on a 1995 gouache, 21.5x35.5 cm; not related to the first decade of 21st century acrylic on canvas of the same title
1996	Cherbourg	1	gouache on paper, 28x38 cm	
1972-97	Catedrais (Cathedrals)	1:Catedrais (1950s)		based on the 1979 painting Les Cathédrales, which was based on the 1950s painting Catedrais
1997	Las Vegas			
1997	Rio	1		reproduced on a tile panel in 1998 as Rio de Janeiro, dated 1995; not related to the 1976 painting of the same title nor to the 1994 painting Rio de Janeiro
1997	Bavaria			
1997	Luz Poente (Sunset Light)			
1997	Columbia			
1997	Argos			
1997	Poissy			based on a 1980 study
1997	Sydney			not related to another painting of the same title
1997	Corinth		oil on canvas, 94x132 cm	
1997	Mercado de Hamburgo (Market in Hamburg)		oil on canvas, 94x126.5 cm	based on a 1992 painting
1997	As Forças da Natureza (The Forces of Nature)			
1997	Fluorescences		acrylic on canvas, 96x120 cm	collection Nadir Afonso Foundation
1997	Hiroshima	1 2 3	oil on canvas, 97x138.5 cm	
not dated	L'Ange de Gabrielle (Gabrielle's Angel)	1	acrylic on canvas, 95.5x130.5 cm	dated 51-98; collection Nadir Afonso Foundation
1965-98	A Montanha de Santa Vitória (Sainte-Victoire Mountain)	1	oil on canvas, 87.5x127.5 cm	not related to the 1980 painting Montagne Sainte-Victoire; based on a 1964 gouache on paper, 31x48 cm, which was updated, not dated but still signed 1964 and exhibited (António Prates gallery, Lisbon, Portugal) in 2007 with a price of €22,000; collection Nadir Afonso Foundation
1998	Nouveaux Astres, Nouvelles Chairs, Nouvelles Fleurs (New Stars, New Flesh, New Flowers)	1		based on a study; alt. title Nouveaux Astres; not related to the first decade of 21st century acrylic on canvas Nouvelles [sic] Astres
1998	Volvograd			
1998	Dhaka	1:gouache 2:gouache 3:gouache/exhibition (left) 4:oil	oil on canvas, 93.5x133.5 cm	alt. dimensions 94x134.5 cm; 2007 sale price (São Mamede gallery): €52,500; based on a non-dated (1990s) gouache on paper, 24,5x37 cm, exhibited in 2007 (António Prates gallery, Lisbon, Portugal) at a price of €22,000, which was based on a study
1998	Corais (Corals)			based on a study
1998	Madrid, Paris, London, Rio de Janeiro, New York, Moscow	1-Rio/New York/Moscow 2:Rio/New York/Moscow 3:Madrid/Paris/London 4:Madrid 5:New York 6:Moscow	six tile panels, c. 240x348 cm each	reproductions of the 1995 paintings of the same titles except Rio de Janeiro, reproduction of the 1997 painting Rio; Restauradores Station, Lisbon Metro
1998-99	Alban	1	oil on canvas, 95x112 cm	
1999	Coríntias (Corinthians)	1 2	oil on canvas, 97.5x130 cm	based on a study
1999	Manila	1 2 3		based on a study
1999	Portes de Clignancourt (Gates of Clignacourt)		acrylic on canvas, 93x114,5 cm	based on a 1995 painting of the same title; collection Nadir Afonso Foundation
2000	Lahore	1		
2000	Íris (Iris)	1 2 3 4 5	acrylic on canvas, 102.5x132 cm	based on a 1998 study; not related to the gouache on paper of the same title; collection Nadir Afonso Foundation
2000	Bonn	1 2	gouache on paper, 35.5x52 cm	
2000	Grifos (Curlies)	1	oil on canvas, 89x134 cm	based on two studies, one of which dated 2000
2000	Atlanta	1	oil on canvas, 92x139 cm	
first decade of the 21st century	Les Terribles Fleurs (The Terrible Flowers)	1 2:exhibition (right)	acrylic on canvas, 97x134 cm	based on a 2000 painting, which was based on a study; 2007 first exhibition price (António Prates gallery, Lisbon, Portugal): €55,000
first decade of the 21st century	Mali	1:exhibition (2nd left)	acrylic on canvas, 90x134 cm	based on a 1961 painting, which was based on a study; 2007 first exhibition price (António Prates gallery, Lisbon, Portugal): €55,000
first decade of the 21st century	Rostock	1 2 3:exhibition (right) 4:exhibition (far left)	acrylic on canvas, 90x139 cm	based on a 1990 painting, which was based on a study; 2007 first exhibition price (António Prates gallery, Lisbon, Portugal): €55,000
first decade of the 21st century	Salem	1:exhibition (2nd right)	acrylic on canvas, 95x134 cm	not related to the 1995 painting of the same title; 2007 first exhibition price (António Prates gallery, Lisbon, Portugal): €55,000
first decade of the 21st century	Hogansville	1:gouache/exhibition (left) 2:acrylic/exhibition (far left)	acrylic on canvas, 89x138 cm	based on a non-dated gouache on paper, 22,5x37,5 cm; 2007 exhibition prices (António Prates gallery, Lisbon, Portugal): gouache on paper €22,000, acrylic on canvas €55,000
first decade of the 21st century	Vera Cruz	1 2 3:detail 4:exhibition (far right) 5:exhibition (2nd left)	acrylic on canvas, 84x116 cm	not related to the 1949 painting of the same title; 2007 first exhibition price (António Prates gallery, Lisbon, Portugal): €55,000
first decade of the 21st century	Nouvelles [sic] Astres (New Stars)	1 2:exhibition 3:detail	acrylic on canvas, 93x129 cm	not related to the 1998 painting Nouveaux Astres, Nouvelles Chairs, Nouvelles Fleurs; 2007 first exhibition price (António Prates gallery, Lisbon, Portugal): €55,000
first decade of the 21st century	Karidi	1:exhibition (left) 2:exhibition (far right)	acrylic on canvas, 92x132 cm	2007 first exhibition price (António Prates gallery, Lisbon, Portugal): €55,000
first decade of the 21st century	Baku	1:gouache/exhibition (center) 2:acrylic/exhibition (center) 3:acrylic/exhibition (far)	acrylic on canvas, 94x136 cm	based on a non-dated gouache on paper, 27x41 cm; 2007 first exhibition prices (António Prates gallery, Lisbon, Portugal): gouache on paper €22,000, acrylic on canvas €55,000
first decade of the 21st century	Rennes		acrylic on canvas, 91x134,5 cm	not related to the 1996 oil on canvas of the same title; 2007 first exhibition price (António Prates gallery, Lisbon, Portugal): €55,000
first decade of the 21st century	Telaviv	1:exhibition (2nd left)	acrylic on canvas, 94x138 cm	2007 first exhibition price (António Prates gallery, Lisbon, Portugal): €55,000
first decade of the 21st century	Heraclion	1:gouache/exhibition (left) 2:acrylic 3:acrylic/exhibition (2nd right) 4:acrylic/exhibition (far left)	acrylic on canvas, 95x134 cm	based on a non-dated gouache on paper, 25,5x38,5 cm; 2007 first exhibition prices (António Prates gallery, Lisbon, Portugal): gouache on paper €22,000, acrylic on canvas €55,000
first decade of the 21st century	Cidades Satélites (Satellite Towns)	1:acrylic/exhibition (2nd right) 2:1999 painting	acrylic on canvas, 93x138 cm	based on a 1999 (alt. date 1998) painting, which was based on a study; 2007 first exhibition price (António Prates gallery, Lisbon, Portugal): €55,000
first decade of the 21st century	Greensboro	1:gouache 2:acrylic 3:acrylic 4:acrylic 5:acrylic/exhibition	acrylic on canvas, 87x139,5 cm	alt. date 2003; reproduction of a gouache on paper, 40x50 cm, which was based on a study; 2007 first exhibition price (António Prates gallery, Lisbon, Portugal): €55,000
first decade of the 21st century	Pouvoirs Surnaturels (Supernatural Powers)	1:study 2:acrylic 3:acrylic 4:acrylic/exhibition (far) 5:acrylic/exhibition (far right) 6:acrylic/exhibition (left)	acrylic on canvas, 170x240 cm	reproduction of a study; one of five oversized paintings by this artist; 2007 first exhibition price (António Prates gallery, Lisbon, Portugal): €100,000
2001	Port-Saïd	1		based on a study
2001	La Seine et le Grand Palais	1		based on the 1957 study Le Grand Palais
2001	Château de Cheverny-Loire	1		based on a study
2001	Gembloux			based on a study
2002	Procissão em Veneza (Procession in Venice)		acrylic on canvas, 97x125 cm	based on a 1970 study; collection Nadir Afonso Foundation
2002	Au Jardin Celeste Giroflé	1		based on a study
2002	Place à Tokyo	1 2	gouache on paper, 40x50 cm	based on a study
2002	Parc de Berteley	1 2		based on a study
2002	Cíclades (Cyclades)			based on a study
2002	La Recherche du Sens (The Search for Sense)			based on a study
2003	Düsseldorf	1 2 3	gouache on paper, 27x29.5 cm	based on a study dated 1990; collection Nadir Afonso Foundation
2003	Cais de Cherbourg (Quay of Cherbourg)			based on a study
2006	Porto	1	gouache on paper, 30x40 cm	
2007	Gôndolas (Gondoles)	1:detail 2:detail 3:exhibition 4:exhibition 5:exhibition 6:study 7:study 8:study	acrylic on canvas, 260x200 cm	one of five oversized paintings by this artist; based on a study; both collection Nadir Afonso Foundation
first decade of the 21st century (2007)	Seville	2 3 4-unmounted 5:exhibition (right)	acrylic on canvas, 176x235 cm	not related to the 1991 oil on canvas of the same title; reproduction of a non-dated gouache on paper, 28,5x40 cm; one of five oversized paintings by this artist; 2007 first exhibition prices (António Prates gallery, Lisbon, Portugal): gouache on paper €22,000, acrylic on canvas €100,000
not dated	Áurea Purpúrea (Scarlet Golden)	1	oil on canvas, 95.5x98 cm	collection Nadir Afonso Foundation
not dated	Montanha Sainte-Victoire	1:exhibition (left)	gouache on paper, 31x48 cm	update of a previously shown version, still signed 1964; not related to the 1980 painting Montagne Sainte-Victoire; 2007 first exhibition price (António Prates gallery, Lisbon, Portugal): €22,000
not dated	Lausanne	1 2	oil on canvas, 96x106 cm	alt. description acrylic on canvas, collection Nadir Afonso Foundation
not dated	Ancône	1:gouache	acrylic on canvas, 97x113.5 cm	based on a gouache on paper, 35.5x52 cm; collection Nadir Afonso Foundation
not dated	O Galo (The Rooster)		acrylic on canvas, 91.5x115 cm	based (mirror reproduction) on the 1997 painting Au Chant du Coq (Crowing of the Rooster); collection Nadir Afonso Foundation
not dated	Bristol		acrylic on canvas, 93.5x133.5 cm	collection Nadir Afonso Foundation
not dated	A Cidade e os Seres (The City and the Beings)		mixed technique, 96x91.5 cm	not to be confused with the acrylic on canvas Os Seres e a Cidade; collection Nadir Afonso Foundation
not dated	Pontes de Cracóvia (Bridges of Krakow)		acrylic on canvas, 96x149.5 cm	collection Nadir Afonso Foundation
not dated	Lille		acrylic on canvas, 92x135 cm	
not dated	Nevis	1 2	acrylic on canvas, 93x134 cm	alt. dimensions 93x135 cm; collection Nadir Afonso Foundation
not dated	Damascus	1	acrylic on canvas, 94.5x131.5 cm	collection Nadir Afonso Foundation
not dated	Teheran		oil on canvas, 90x129.5 cm	collection Nadir Afonso Foundation
not dated	Monza	1:gouache	acrylic on canvas, 95x121 cm	based on a gouache on paper, 38.5x57 cm; collection Nadir Afonso Foundation
not dated	Munich	1 2	acrylic on canvas, 95.5x99.5 cm	not related to the 1995 painting of the same title; collection Nadir Afonso Foundation
not dated	Buenos Aires	1	oil on canvas, 94.5x108 cm	alt. description acrylic on canvas, 97x108 cm; loosely based on the 1952 painting of the same title; collection Nadir Afonso Foundation
not dated	Norderlingen		acrylic on canvas, 84x116 cm	2007 first exhibition price (António Prates gallery, Lisbon, Portugal): €55,000
	Jardins de Antuérpia (Gardens of Antwerp)		acrylic on canvas, 98x110 cm	collection Nadir Afonso Foundation
	Finland	1	gouache on paper, 27.3x33 cm	collection Nadir Afonso Foundation
	A Cidade dos Príncipes (The City of Princes)	1:1999 painting 2:1999 painting 3:1999 painting 4:1999 painting	acrylic on canvas, 96x135 cm	based on a 1999 painting of the same title, which was based on a study; collection Nadir Afonso Foundation
	Mortes Même dans le Souvenir (Dead Even in Remembrance)	1 2:2001 painting 3:2001 painting	acrylic on canvas, 97x126 cm	based on a 2001 painting of the same title (alt. title Mortes dans le Souvenir [Dead in Remembrance]), which was based on a study; collection Nadir Afonso Foundation
	Jardins de Pensilvanie (Gardens of Pennsylvania)	1 1:2001 painting 2:2001 painting	acrylic on canvas, 97x134 cm	alt. title Jardins da Pensilvânia; based on a 2001 painting of the same title; collection Nadir Afonso Foundation
	Gare de Austerlitz	1:2000 painting 2:2000 painting 3:2000 painting 4	acrylic on canvas, 96x134 cm	based on a 2000 painting, which was based on a 1980 study, both of the same title; collection Nadir Afonso Foundation
	Électre et Oreste (Electra and Orestes)	1 2	acrylic on canvas, 97x114 cm	based on a 1986 painting of the same title (alt. title Electra), which was based on a study; collection Nadir Afonso Foundation
	As Pontes sobre o Reno (The Bridges on the Rhine)	1:2001 painting 2:2001 painting	acrylic on canvas, 93x138 cm	based on a 2001 painting of the same title, which was based on a 1981 study; collection Nadir Afonso Foundation
	Madrasah	1 2	acrylic on canvas, 96x106 cm	based on a 2000 painting of the same title, which was based on another study; collection Nadir Afonso Foundation
	Estátuas Móveis (Moving Statues)	1:exhibition (right)	acrylic on canvas, 98x125 cm	based on a 2000 painting of the same title, which was based on the 1960 study Les Statues; collection Nadir Afonso Foundation
	Os Seres e a Cidade (The Beings and the City)	1	acrylic on canvas, 97x108 cm	not to be confused with the non-dated mixed technique A Cidade e os Seres; collection Nadir Afonso Foundation
	Abidjan	1	gouache on paper, 38.5x57 cm	
	Barcelona	1:gouache 2:gouache 3:painting		based on a 2001 gouache on paper of the same title, 38.5x57 cm, which was based on a 1995 study; NB link for painting provides wrong description
	Basinfall Street	1	oil on canvas, 86.5x139 cm	based on a 1996 painting
	Belize	1	gouache on paper, 38.5x57 cm	
	Boavista	1	gouache on paper, 40x50 cm	
	Brest	1	oil on canvas, 96x124 cm	
	Chicago	1	gouache on paper, 26x42 cm	not related to the 1985 painting nor to another painting, both of the same title
	Chicago	1 2		based on a study; not related to the 1985 painting nor to the gouache on paper, both of the same title
	Terra Devastada (Ravaged Land)	1	mixed technique on canvas, 94x132 cm	collection Nadir Afonso Foundation
	Nagasaki	1		
	Flora do Marajó (Flora of Marajó)	1 2	oil on canvas, 83.5x137.5 cm	based on two studies, the later of which dated 1991
	Floras	1		based on two studies, one of which dated 1955, on paper, 40x50 cm; NB link provides wrong description
	Madrid	1	gouache on paper, 28x35 cm	not related to the 1954 study, the 1994 gouache, and the 1995 painting, all of the same title
	Orla Negra (Black Rim)	1	oil on canvas, 91x130 cm	
	Salamanca	1 2:study		based on a study on paper, 40x50 cm
	Cordoba	1		
	Bilbao	1		
	Mexico City	1		
	Ninfas (Nymphs)	1		not related to the 1982 study Nymphes
	Sapporo	1	oil on canvas, 96x125 cm	
	Serra do Pilar (Pilar Mountains)	1 2	oil on canvas, 92x130 cm	
	Singapure	1	oil on canvas, 85x130 cm	
	Tianjin	1	oil on canvas, 89x134 cm	based on two studies, the later of which dated 2001
	Vaduz	1	gouache on paper, 40x50 cm	
	Washington	1	oil on canvas, 96x124 cm	
	Zoroastro (Zaratusthra)	1	gouache on paper, 40x50 cm	
	Sintra	1		
	Ciclíades (Cyclades)	1		
	Sydney	1		not related to the 1997 painting of the same title
	Vienna	1 2		based on two studies, dated 1993 and 2000; not related to the 1950 painting of the same title
	Doges	1 2:detail		one of five oversized paintings by this artist; never publicly exhibited
	Gardénias	1		
	Cette Terre-ci et le Christianisme (This Land and Christianism)	1		
	Beijing	1		
	Boticas	1		
	Seattle	1	gouache on paper, 27.5x34 cm	collection Nadir Afonso Foundation

=== Women series ===
Date	Title	Image	Description	Notes
1962	Olympiades à Rio (Olympic Games in Rio)			study
1963	Cariocas			
1968	As Marionetas (The Marionettes)			study
1973	Mulheres (Women)			study; legend Les chiens et les femmes
1980	Sabinas (Sabine Women)			study
1981	Les Femmes et les Chiens (The Women and the Dogs)			based on a study
1982	No Title		oil on canvas, 95.5x117.5 cm	motif: two women and a ball on the beach
1982	Nymphes (Nymphs)			study; not related to the painting Ninfas
1982	A Moda (The Fashion)			study
1982	Sílvia Áurea	1 2		based on the 1962 study «The Stars»
1983	Mulheres de Dima (Women of Dima)			study
1986	Os Tatuados (The Tattooed)			based on a study
1987	Deusas (Goddesses)			
1949-88	As Filhas de Sião (The Daughters of Siam)			based on a 1968 oil on canvas, 100.5x112 cm
1988	Sphnix			
1988	Orízias (Oreithyias)			based on two studies, the later dated 49-78
1988	As Quatro Irmãs (The Four Sisters)			dated 89
1947-89	Três Irmãs (Three Sisters)		oil on canvas, 96.5x109.5 cm	dated 47-89; alt. date 1949-89; alt. title Três Mulheres (Three Women)
1947-89	As Banhistas (The Bathing Women)		oil on canvas, 74x105 cm	not related to the 1940 painting Banhistas
1952-89	Mulheres na Praia (Women on the Beach)		oil on canvas, 96x119 cm	dated 1952-89; alt. date 1988
1989	A Cidade Longínqua (The Far City)	1		based on the 1959 study Moças na Praia (Girls at the Beach)
1989	Sanremo			study
1989	Deusas do Vento (Goddesses of the Wind)	1 2 3		
1989	Gueixas (Gheishas)			
1991	Jeunes Filles (Young Girls)	1:gouache/exhibition (right)	acrylic on canvas, 93x134 cm	based on a non-dated (1984–91) gouache on paper, 21x33 cm, exhibited in 2007 (António Prates gallery, Lisbon, Portugal) for €22,000; not related to the 1947-87 painting of the same title; collection Nadir Afonso Foundation
1993	Au Ciel (In Heaven)			based on a study
1998	As Princesas (The Princesses)			based on a 1968 study; not related to the 1991 painting of the same style
1999	Olympus			based on a study
1948–2000	Couple			based on a 1948 (alt. date 1949) study
2001	Sirènes (Mermaids)	1 2		based on a 1968 study
2001	As Raças (The Races)	1		based on a 1964 (titled Les Races) study
2002	As Amantes de Lúcifer (Lucifer's Lovers)			based on a study; not related to the non-dated oil on canvas of the same title
not dated	Bordel (Brothel)	1 2 3	acrylic on canvas, 95x134 cm	based on the 45-91 painting Bourdele which was based on, or an update of, a study dated 1945; collection Nadir Afonso Foundation
not dated	As Amantes de Lúcifer (Lucifer's Lovers)	1	oil on canvas, 95x127 cm	based on the 51-91 painting Lucifer; not related to the 2002 painting of the same title; alt. title Os Amantes de Lúcifer; collection Nadir Afonso Foundation
not dated	Jeux (Games)	1:exhibition (right)	gouache on paper, 23,5x37,5 cm	update of a 1999 painting of the same title, which was based on a study; 2007 first exhibition price (António Prates gallery, Lisbon, Portugal): €22,000
not dated	Le Trottoir (The Sidewalk)	1 2:exhibition (right)	gouache on paper, 26,5x32 cm	2007 first exhibition price (António Prates gallery, Lisbon, Portugal): €22,000
	Le Rêve (The Dream)	1 2:Exhibition	acrylic on canvas, 97x127 cm	reproduction of a 2002 painting of the same title, which was based on a study; collection Nadir Afonso Foundation
	Criselefantinas (Criselefantines)	1:2002 painting	acrylic on canvas, 98x134 cm	based on a 2002 painting of the same title, which was based on a study; collection Nadir Afonso Foundation

=== Unidentified ===
Date	Title	Image	Description	Notes
1946	No Title	1/paid subscription required	oil on canvas, 73x64 cm	auctioned on October 1, 2003
1951	Les Cocottes	1/paid subscription required	watercolor on paper, 22x32.5 cm	auctioned on March 6, 2006
1953	No Title	1/paid subscription required	gouache on paper, 21.5x30.5 cm	auctioned on May 24, 2001
1960	No Title	1/paid subscription required	gouache on paper, 21.5x32 cm	auctioned on May 24, 2001

== Engravings ==
=== Lithography ===
Lithograph is on paper and the measures are given for the printed area.

Date	Title	Image	Description	Print Run	Publisher	Notes
	No Title	1 (lot 1)	33x45 cm	20		reproduction of the 1987 oil on canvas Plaza del Sol; marked P.A. (Author's Proof) and numbered in Roman numerals (I through XX/XX); print IX/XX auctioned on October 11, 2007, by Leiria e Nascimento (Lisbon, Portugal), estimate: €200-300

=== Serigraphy ===
All serigraphs are on paper and all measures are given for the printed area unless otherwise stated.

Date	Title	Image	Description	Print Run	Publisher	Notes
1970	Babylon	1 2	31.5x51.5 cm			based on the 1975 painting of the same title; 2005 exhibition price: €1100
1970	Os Portugueses (The Portuguese)	1	32x50.5 cm			reproduction of the 1960s painting of the same title; 2005 exhibition price: €1100
1970	Silices	1	38.5x51.5 cm			reproduction of the 1968-70 oil on canvas of the same title; 2005 exhibition price: €1100
1970	Rue Chappe (Chappe Street)					based on, or the reproduction of, the 1966-80 painting of the same title
1970	Copacabana	1	34x50.5 cm			reproduction of the 1955 painting of the same title; 2005 exhibition price: €1100
1970	Nouveaux Espaces (New Spaces)	1	36x50.5 cm			based on the 1968-71 painting of the same title; 2005 exhibition price: €1100
1970	Idade Média (Middle Ages)	1 2	33.5x50.5 cm			based on the 1960-81 painting Moyen Âge; 2005 exhibition price: €1100
1970	Fontainebleau	1	33.5x50.5 cm			based on the 1962-78 painting of the same title; 2005 exhibition price: €1100
1970	Les Villes	1	36x53.5 cm			2005 exhibition price: €1100
1970	Place de la Gare	1 2	36x50 cm			based on the 1968-78 painting of the same title; 2005 exhibition price: €1100
1977	S. Paulo	1	34x47 cm	150		reproduction of the 1977 painting of the same title
1980	Heliopolis	1	42x59.5 cm			based on the 1972 painting of the same title; 2005 exhibition price: €1100
1980	Pittsburgh					based on the 1971 painting of the same title
1980	Brussels	1 2/paid subscription required	37.5x62 cm			reproduction of the 1971 painting of the same title; auctioned on May 9, 2001; 2005 exhibition price: €1100
1980	L'Aurore des Villes (The Dawn of the Cities)	1	37.5x62 cm			based on the 1971-78 painting of the same title; 2005 exhibition price: €1100
1981	Le Bois (The Forest)	1 2	25x40 cm			
1981	O Cais (The Dock)	1 2 3	26x35 cm	150		2007 private sale price: USD $724
1982	Cathedral					reproduction of the 1972-97 painting Catedrais
1982	A Perspectiva (The Perspective)	1				based on the 1965 oil on canvas Perspective II
1982	La Lumière du Prisme (The Light of the Prism)					based on the 1976-83 painting of the same title
1984	Manège	1	serigraph on canvas, 57.5x79 cm			based on the 1982 painting of the same title; 2005 exhibition price: €2,500
1984	Pontes de Leninegrado (Bridges of Leningrad)	1	19.5x27.5 cm			reproduction of the 1970s painting Les Ponts de Leningrad; 2005 exhibition price: €575
1984	Douro					reproduction of the 1972 painting of the same title
1985	Plaza del Sol	1	28x38 cm	200		reproduction of the 1987 oil on canvas of the same title
1986	Praça de Oslo (Oslo Square)					reproduction of the 1975 study of the same title
1988	Acrópole Nuclear (Nuclear Akropolis)					based on, or the reproduction of, the 1970 painting Acropole Nucléaire
1988	Niteroi					based on, or the reproduction of, the 1970 painting of the same title
1988	Les Ponts de Paris (The Bridges of Paris)	1 2/paid subscription required	28.5x45.5 cm			alt. title Pontes de Paris; reproduction of the 1977 oil on canvas of the same title; auctioned on May 9, 2001; 2005 exhibition price: €1100
1989	Nouveau Centre (New Center)					reproduction of the 1982 painting L'Ancien Centre
1990	As Pontes de Siracusa (The Bridges of Syracuse)					reproduction of the 1986 painting of the same title
1990	Olimpíadas (Olympic Games)					based on the 1962 study Olympiades à Rio (Olympic Games in Rio)
1993	Seville					reproduction of the 1991 oil on canvas of the same title
1994	Les Confins (The Borders)					reproduction of the 1981 painting of the same title
1996	As Praias de Istambul (The Beaches of Istanbul)	1	46.5x57 cm	150		based on the 1990 painting Praia de Istambul
1997	Composição Período Barroco (Composition Baroque Period)	1	16.5x22 cm	150	Centro Português de Serigrafia, Lisbon	alt. title Composition; 2005 exhibition price: €575
1997	Zurique	1	44x70 cm		Centro Português de Serigrafia, Lisbon	
1997		1	44.3x65 cm		Centro Português de Serigrafia, Lisbon	Ref. S363
1997	L'Opéra	1	43x65.5 cm	175		based on the 1986 oil on canvas of the same title; 2005 exhibition price: €1100
1999	Porto Alegre	1	70x100 cm (paper size)	200		not related to the 1996 painting of the same title
1999	A Ponte Lilás	1	50x70 cm (paper size)	200		alt title Le Pont Violet (The Lilac Bridge); not related to the 1982 painting Porte Lilas
2005	Nouveaux Astres, Nouvelles Chairs, Nouvelles Fleurs (New Stars, New Flesh, New Flowers)	1	60.5x86 cm			reproduction of the 1998 painting of the same title; original price: €1300
	Évora	1	44.5x50 cm			reproduction of the 1945 painting Évora Surrealista; 2005 exhibition price: €1100
	Flora					based on the 1956 painting of the same title
	Les Spirales	1	43x53 cm	100		reproduction of the 1992 painting of the same title
		1	44x52 cm	100		(colors: green, yellow, white, black)
		1	33x47 cm	200		
		1			Perve Galeria, Lisbon	Ref. NA-SG1
		1			Perve Galeria, Lisbon	Ref. NA-SG2
	Venice	1 2 3	42x56 cm			alt. title Procissão em Veneza; based on the 2002 painting Procissão em Veneza; 2005 exhibition price: €1100
	Jardins de Pensilvanie (Gardens of Pennsylvania)	1	38.5x55.5 cm			reproduction of the 2001 painting of the same title; 2005 exhibition price: €1100
	Parque de S. Paulo	1	34x47 cm			reproduction of the 1996 acrylic on canvas of the same title; 2005 exhibition price: €1100
	Machine	1	48.5x42 cm			2005 exhibition price: €1100
	Íris (Iris)	1	35x47 cm			reproduction of the 2000 acrylic on canvas of the same title; 2005 exhibition price: €1100
		1		500		motif: the keep of Chaves; used as the logo of the website of the Municipality of Chaves
	Parma				Centro Português de Serigrafia, Lisbon	reproduction of the 1991 oil on canvas of the same title; private edition, unnumbered
	Terra (Land)	1 2 3	45x65 cm (70x100 cm paper size)			reproduction of the 1966 gouache on paper Ocidente which was the basis for the 1978 gouache on paper La Terre; 2007 prices: by a dealer €400, by a private owner €850

=== Others ===
Date	Title	Image	Description	Notes
1978	Cidade de Chaves		medal, 264 g, ∅90 mm	issue of 500; engraved by Cabral Antunes; reverse features a relief reproduction of the 1978 painting La Ville de Chaves
1989	20th Century Portuguese Painting - Fourth Group	1	Portuguese postage stamp	first day of issue: July 7, 1989; face value: PTE 60$, print run: 600,000; painting reproduced: Les Spirales (1954); offset print, 25-stamp sheets
2000	Parque de S. Paulo (detail)	1 2	ceramic plate, edition of 100	Based on the 1996 acrylic on canvas of the same title; auctioned by Leiloeira RR: on October 19, 2006, base price: €100, and on February 21, 2008
2001	Artistas Transmontanos - Nadir Afonso	1	wine bottle label	produced by Caves de Valpaços, Portugal
2007	Great Portuguese Artists - 2nd Series (Nadir Afonso)	1:stamps 2:FDC 3:FDC 4:FDC 5:inside of brochure 6:cover of brochure	series of 3 Portuguese postage stamps, 40x30,6 mm each	first day of issue: September 5, 2007; face value / print run / paintings reproduced: €0,30 / 380,000 / Horus (1953), €0,45 / 230,000 / Venice (1956), €0,61 / 230,000 / Procissão em Veneza (2002); offset print, 50-stamp sheets; FDC-first day cover retail price: €1,91; presentation pack retail price: €2,06; presentation pack contents: one stamp of each, one brochure; retail pack price: €2,61; retail pack contents: one stamp of each, brochure, envelope C6
2007	Medalha Nadir Afonso/Grupo Desportivo de Chaves	1	medal, ∅90 mm	issue of 500; obverse features an enamel reproduction of an original painting by the artist; price: €300/members, €500/non-members, for the benefit of Grupo Desportivo de Chaves (the artist's hometown sports club)
	Zurich (detail)	1	ceramic plate, private edition of 250, Centro Português de Serigrafia	Based on the 1997 serigraph of the same title

== Architecture ==
=== Own works ===
Projects by Nadir Afonso.

Date	Project	Location	Image	Coordinates	Notes
1950s	Single-family house	Chaves, Portugal	1	41°44′39″N 7°27′50″W	
1950s	Multiple-unit residential building	Chaves, Portugal	1	41°44′14″N 7°27′56″W	
1955	Monument to Henry, the Navigator	Sagres, Portugal	1 2		Public bid, finalist; not built
1965	Panreal-Vila Real Panificadora, Lda.	Vila Real, Portugal	1 2 3 4	41°17′37″N 7°44′7″W	Baking factory
	Panificadora de Chaves	Chaves, Portugal	1 2 3	41°44′54″N 7°28′19″W	Baking factory

=== Le Corbusier ===
Projects by Le Corbusier, collaboration by Nadir Afonso.

Date	Project	Location	Image	Coordinates	Notes
1945	Usine Claude et Duval	Saint-Dié-des-Vosges, France	1 2	48°17′27″N 6°57′3″E	Also known as Duval factory; produced millinery; historic monument; subject of Nadir Afonso's 1948 thesis Architecture Is Not an Art
1946	Unité d'Habitation	Marseille, France	1	43°15′40″N 5°23′46″E	Multiple-unit residential and hotel building
