= Ester de Lemos =

Portuguese writer and former politician (born 1929)

- Born: Maria Esther Guerne Garcia de Lemos; 2 November 1929 (age 96); Bombarral, Portugal
- Occupations: Teacher, writer and translator
- Years active: 65
- Known for: Member of the National Assembly of Portugal during the Estado Novo era

Ester de Lemos, sometimes written as Esther, (born 1929) is a university professor, translator and Portuguese writer. A supporter of the Estado Novo regime, she was a member of the National Assembly of Portugal between 1965 and 1969.

== Early life ==
Maria Esther Guerne Garcia de Lemos Trigueiros de Martel was born in the parish of Carvalhal in Bombarral in the District of Leiria in central Portugal on 2 November 1929. She was the seventh and last daughter of Ester Guerne and Jaime Garcia de Lemos, who had fought in World War I. She graduated in Romanic Philology from the University of Lisbon in 1952. From 1954 she worked on radio programmes on literary topics. Between 1957 and 1963 she was an assistant professor at the Faculty of Arts at the University of Lisbon. In 1963, she interrupted her teaching to work on a doctorate, but fell out with her supervisor, Jacinto Prado Coelho, who was president of the Portuguese Society of Writers, and did not complete the thesis. She then worked as a linguistic consultant, resuming teaching in 1971. Following the overthrow of the Estado Novo in 1974, she lost her job at the University of Lisbon. She then became a secondary school teacher. She taught at the Higher Institute of New Professions in Lisbon from 1990.

== Political career ==
Lemos was a convinced Catholic and a strong supporter of the Estado Novo. She was included on the regime's list of candidates for the 1965 election, which assured automatic election. During her term in the National Assembly, she was on committees concerned with education, popular culture and spiritual and moral interests.

In addition to contributing to magazines for very young children, she also wrote for the magazine published by the Mocidade Portuguesa Feminina, the organization of the Estado Novo established for girls, for which membership was compulsory. She also collaborated with the magazine Tempo Presente.

== Writing and translation ==
In her research Lemos paid particular attention to the works of the Portuguese writers Camilo Castelo Branco and José Maria de Eça de Queirós and wrote prefaces to editions of their work. She translated, and wrote books about Giovanni Boccaccio and Francesco Petrarch and others. She also wrote novels and children's stories. For her novel, Companheiros, she was awarded in 1960 the Eça de Queirós prize by the Secretariado Nacional de Informação, the propaganda arm of the Estado Novo.

== Publications ==
Publications written by Lemos include:

- D. Maria II: a rainha e a mulher (D. Maria II: the queen and mother)
- A borboleta sem asas (The wingless butterfly), 1958
- Na aurora da nossa poesia (On the dawn of our poetry), 1950s
- Companheiros (Companions), 1962
- A Rainha de Babilónia (The Queen of Babylon). Children's stories, 1962
- A literatura infantil em Portugal (Children's literature in Portugal), 1972
- Boccaccio, 1972
- Petrarca, 1972
- Camões, 1972
- Rapariga (Girl), 1985
- Picapau: O balão cor de laranja e outras histórias (The orange balloon and other stories), 1986
- Terra de ninguém: contos (Land of no one: stories), 1994
- Mesmo Bom para Ler na Páscoa (Really good to read at Easter), Children's, 2019
