= Virgínia Vitorino =

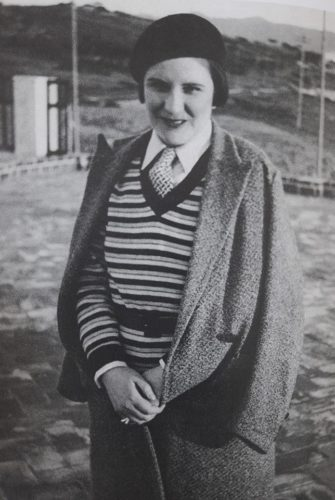
- Author Virgínia Vitorino in the 1920s
- Born: August 13, 1895; Alcobaça, Portugal
- Died: December 21, 1967 (aged 72); Lisbon, Portugal
- Occupations: Poet, playwright, and teacher
- Writing career
- Notable awards: Prémio Gil Vicente (1938)

Virgínia de Sousa Vitorino (August 13, 1895 – December 21, 1967), better known as Virgínia Vitorino, was a Portuguese poet, playwright, and teacher. She received the Prémio Gil Vicente in 1938.

== Biography ==
Virgínia Vitorino was born in 1895 in Alcobaça, Portugal, the daughter of Joaquim de Sousa Vitorino, a mail carrier, and Guilhermina Vila-Nova.

She pursued Romance studies at the University of Lisbon and attended the school of the Conservatório Nacional de Lisboa, where she studied piano and singing, and learned Italian. She went on to teach Portuguese, French, and Italian at the conservatory for around four decades, as well as teaching high school students.

Vitorino was an early employee of the Emissora Nacional, the country's public broadcaster, where she directed various radio plays. On the radio, she used the pseudonym Maria João do Vale.

Over the course of her career, she was the author of three books of poetry and six works of theater, all of which were staged by Amélia Rey Colaço and Robles Monteiro's theater company at the D. Maria II National Theatre. Her plays were characterized by a subtle social criticism paired with nationalist fervor. Her first book of poetry, Namorados (1918), was published 14 times: 12 editions in Portugal and 2 in Brazil. In this period, she was considered one of her country's most popular female poets. She worked with the artist Almada Negreiros to illustrate some of her books.

In 1929, Vitorino was honored as an Officer in the Ordem Militar de Cristo, and in 1930 she was named a Dame of the Military Order of Saint James of the Sword. That same year, she was given a Cross of Alfonso XII from the Spanish government. Around 1937, she traveled to Brazil on the invitation of then-President Getúlio Vargas. The following year, she received the Prémio Gil Vicente for her play Camaradas.

== Personal life, death and legacy ==
Vitorino never married, and her "personal refusal of any heterosexual engagement" has led some scholars to assess her long-term companionships with fellow women Virgínia Ferreira and Olga Sarmento as covert lesbian partnerships.

She died in 1967, in Lisbon, at age 72. She is buried in the Alto de São João Cemetery. Since her death, locations in both Lisboa and her hometown of Alcobaça have been named in her honor.

The scholar Jorge Pereira de Sampaio has labeled her "one of the most influential women in Portuguese literature in the first half of the 20th century." In the Antologia da Poesia Feminina Portuguesa (1972), the writer António Salvado said that Vitorino wrote "some of the most interesting sonnets of Portuguese love poetry."

== Selected works ==
- Namorados (1920)
- Apaixonadamente (1923)
- Renúncia (1926)
- Degredados (1931) play in 3 acts
- A Volta (1932) play in 3 acts
- Fascinação (1933) play in 3 acts
- Manuela (1934) play in 3 acts and 4 scenes
- Camaradas (1938) play in 3 acts
- Vendaval (1942) play in 3 acts
