= Bombarral =

- Municipality
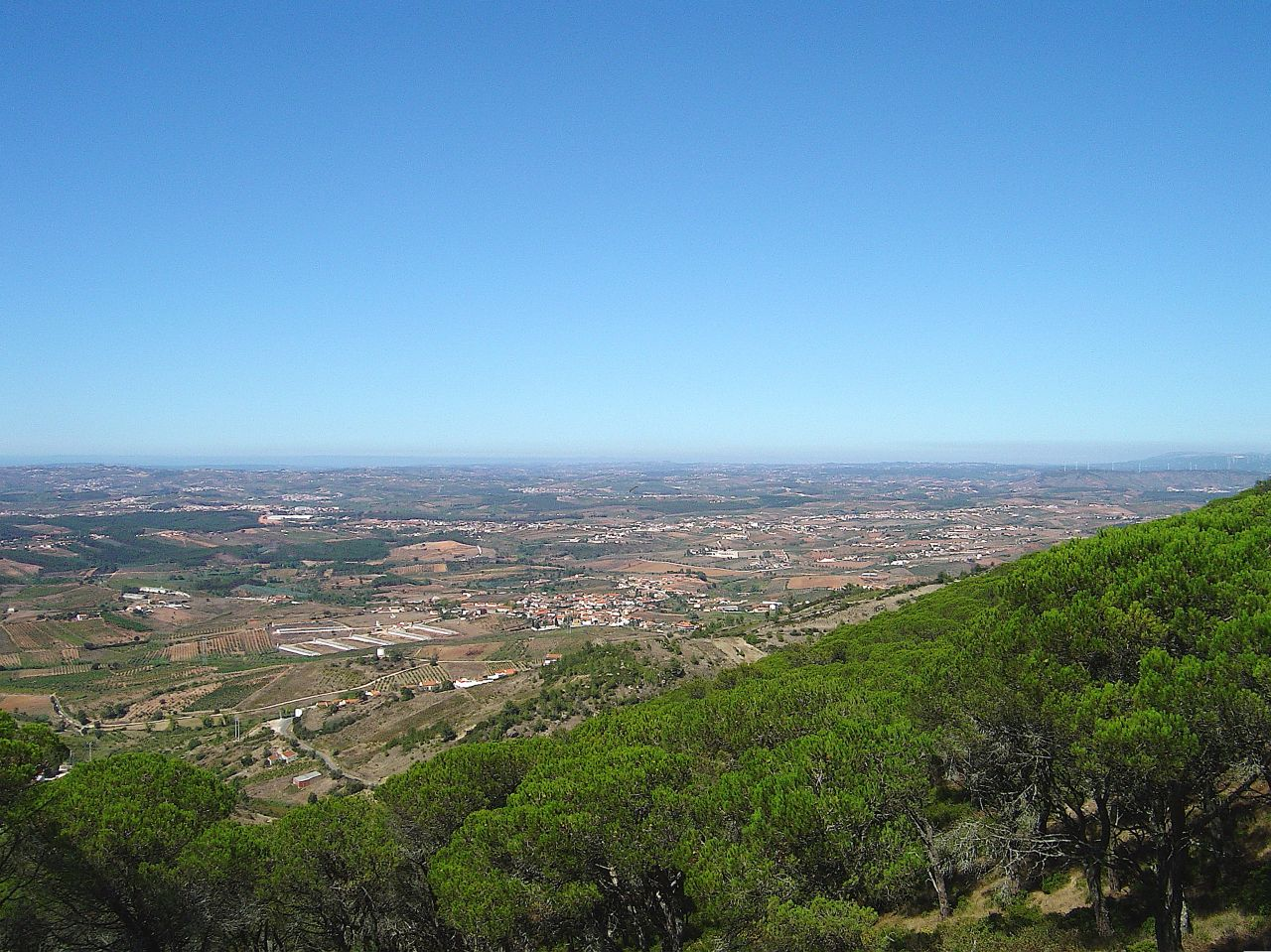
- The view from the Serra de Montejunto, overlooking Bombarral

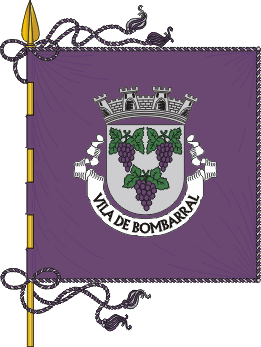
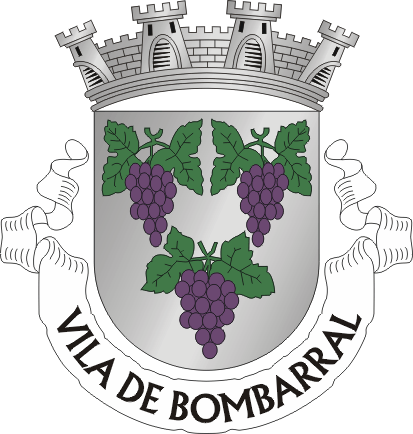
- Flag Coat of arms
- Interactive map of Bombarral
- Location in Portugal
- Coordinates: 39°16′5″N 9°9′19″W
- Country: Portugal
- Region: Oeste e Vale do Tejo
- Intermunic. comm.: Oeste
- District: Leiria
- Parishes: 4

Government
  - President: José Manuel Vieira

Area
  - Total: 91.29 km^{2} (35.25 sq mi)
- Elevation: 34 m (112 ft)

Population (2011)
  - Total: 13,193
  - Density: 144.5/km^{2} (374.3/sq mi)
- Time zone: UTC+00:00 (WET)
  - Summer (DST): UTC+01:00 (WEST)
- Postal code: 2540
- Area code: 262
- Patron: São Pedro
- Website: http://www.cm-bombarral.pt/

Bombarral (Portuguese pronunciation: [bõbɐˈʁal]) is a Portuguese municipality in the Oeste region, historical province of Estremadura, and the Leiria district. The population in 2011 was 13,193, in an area of 91.29 square kilometres (35.25 mi^{2}). It includes four civil parishes (Portuguese: freguesia) that provide local services.

== History ==
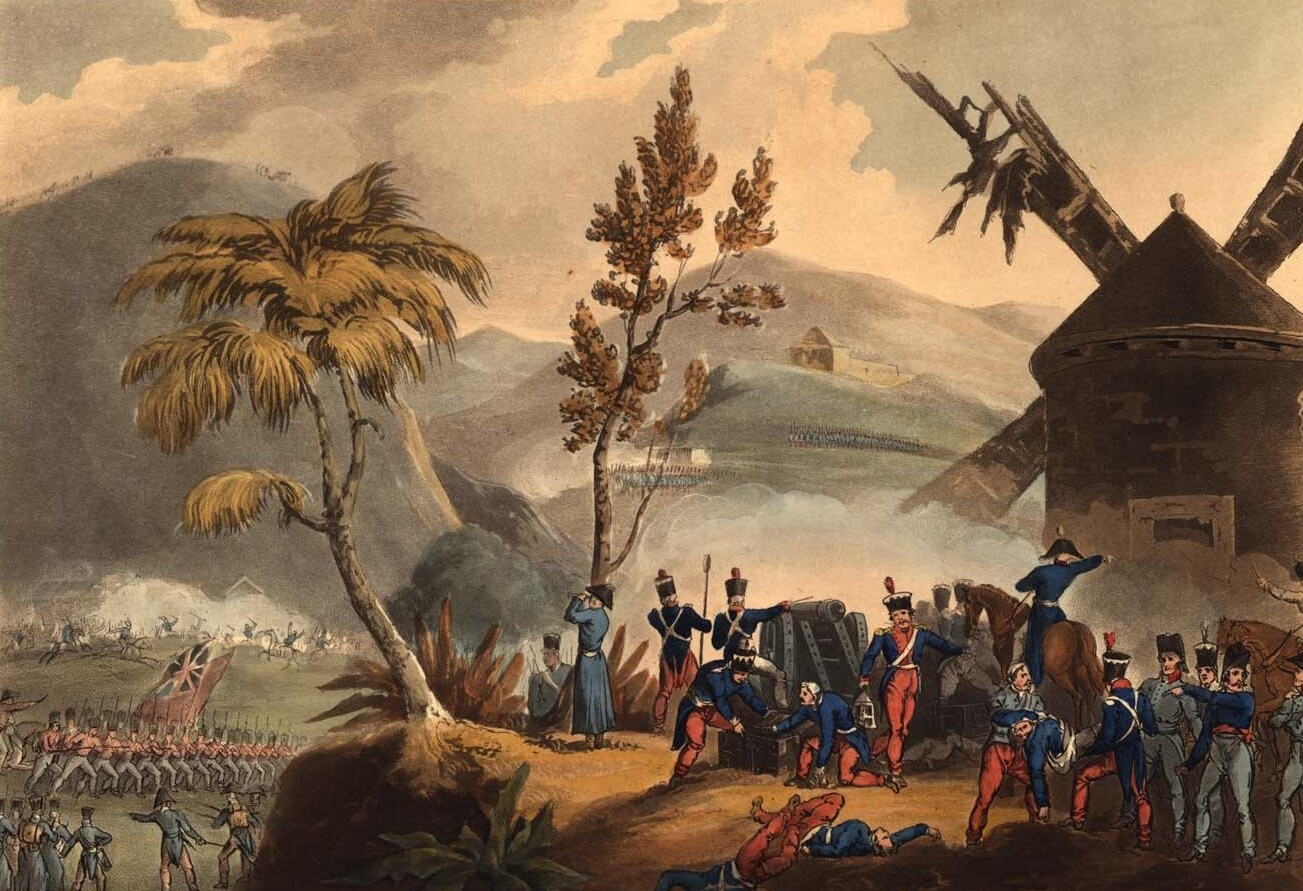
Painting of the Battle of Roliça, showing French troops in the hilltops attacking the much larger British force in the valley

It is known that the area of Bombarral was occupied during the geological period, and there exist vestiges of human settlement throughout the municipality, including pre-historic remnants in Gruta Nova, Lapa do Suão and the Neolithic fortifications of Columbeira and the Castro de São Mamede.

Most documented references to Bombarral begin in the 14th century, when the area was under the dominion of the Monastery of Alcobaça.

With the creation of Portugal, King Afonso Henriques donated the lands to Cistercian monks, around 1153. Before, the Battle of Aljubarrota King John of Portugal stayed in Bombarral with his Knight, Luís Henriques, in the strong-house that would later be converted into the municipality's council hall.

In the 18th century it was recognized as "Queens lands", and part of the municipality of Cadaval until 1852. During the Peninsular War, 15000 Anglo-Portuguese troops confronted a much smaller army of French infantry and cavalry (5000 total) in Roliça in the first engagement by British forces. The Battle of Roliça, along the northern frontier with Óbidos, was a confrontation between English General Arthur Wellesley and French General Henri François, Comte Delaborde, who were sent by General Jean-Andoche Junot, to harass and hold British forces until a much larger force could confront the English. The valleys and gullies of Roliça allowed the small French contingent to confront the much larger British force, yet they were unable to defeat them. Although successful, Wellesley did not press the fleeing French troops (who withdrew to Montachique near Torres Vedras), and instead went to support the landing of 4000 troops arriving from England along the coast.

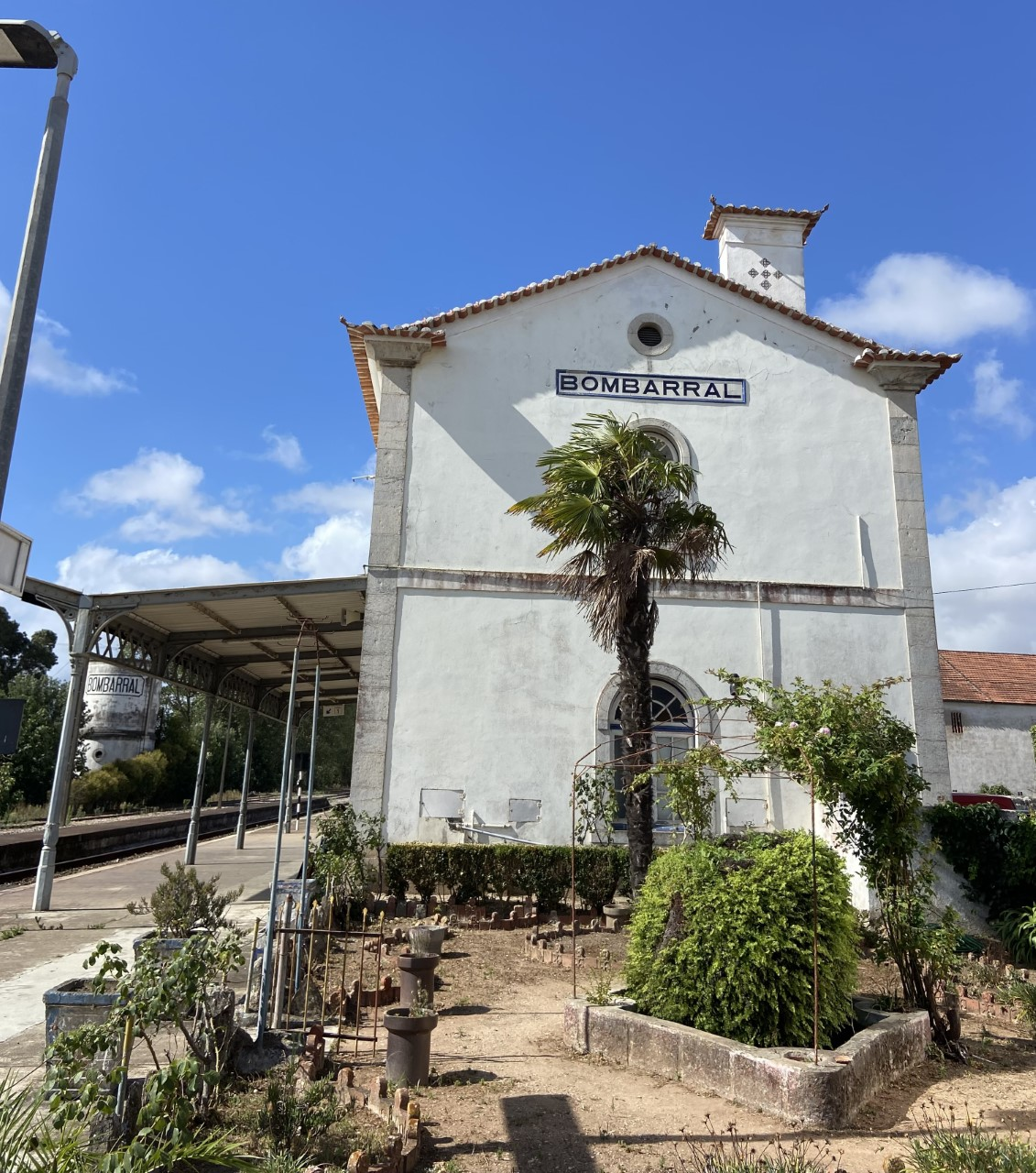
The Train Station in Bombarral

The railway connecting Bombarral to Lisbon and Leiria came in 1887, starting a period of accelerated economic development.

Until 1914, Bombarral was a parish of the municipality of neighbouring Óbidos. The present-day municipality was created that year.

== Geography ==
=== Physical geography ===
Bombarral is situated in a privileged geographic region in the extreme southern part of the District of Leiria, in the centre of Western Tourist Region (Portuguese: Região de Turismo do Oeste), 75 kilometres from Lisbon and 20 kilometres from the Atlantic Ocean. The municipality is limited to the north by the municipalities of Óbidos, to the northeast by Caldas da Rainha, southeast by Cadaval and west by Lourinhã.

Bombarral is situated on an alluvial plain that is fertile, with a gentle topography of lowlands.

=== Human geography ===
Population of Bombarral Municipality (1849 - 2011)
Year	Pop.	±%
1920	11,206	—
1930	12,669	+13.1%
1960	15,209	+20.0%
1981	13,758	−9.5%
1991	12,727	−7.5%
2001	13,324	+4.7%
2011	13,193	−1.0%

Administratively, the municipality is divided into 4 civil parishes (freguesias):

- Bombarral e Vale Covo
- Carvalhal
- Pó
- Roliça

The A8 is the primary thoroughfare connecting Bombarral with its neighbours.

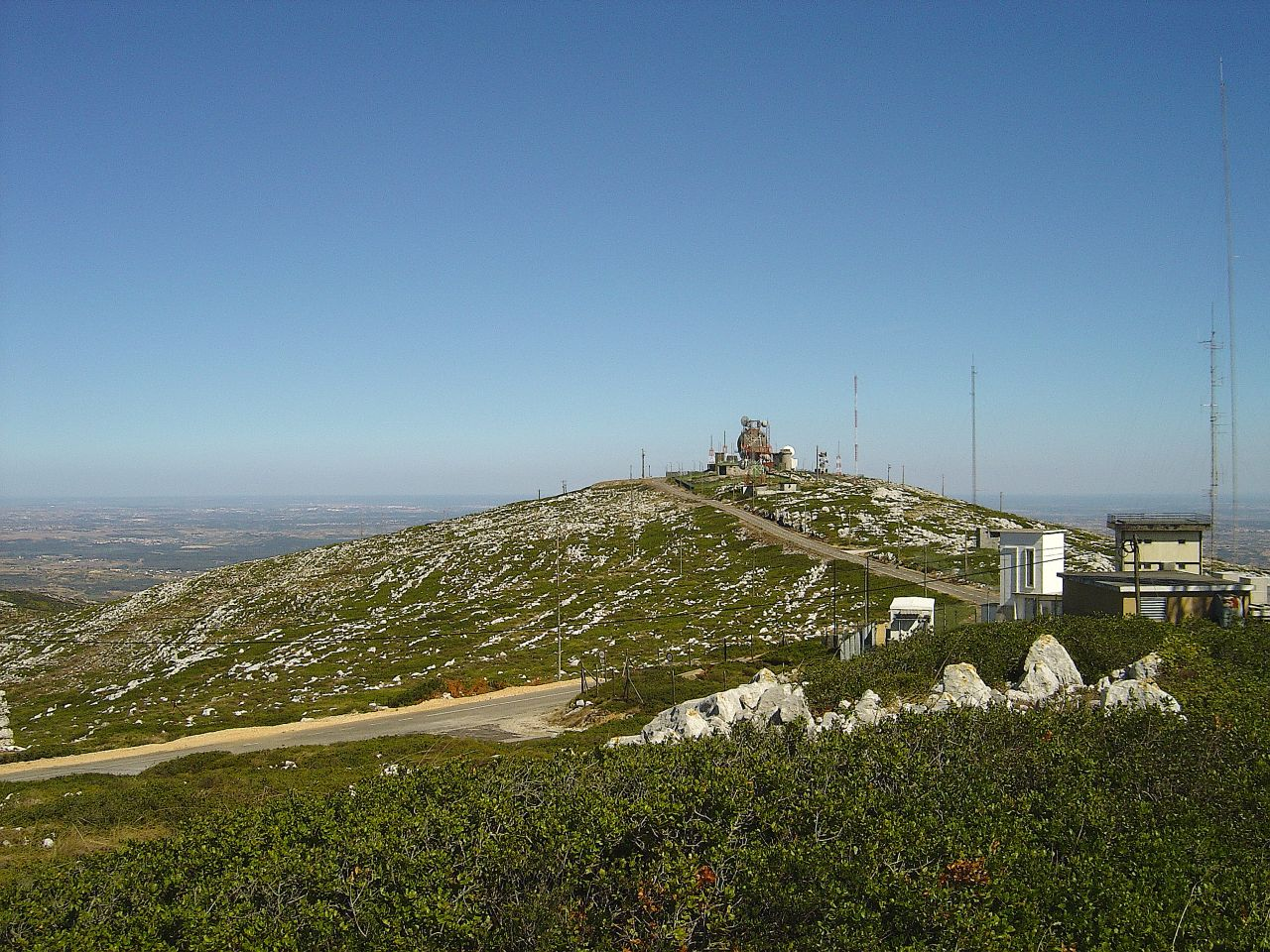
The rock-covered hilltop of the Serra de Montejunto

==== Twin towns — Sister cities ====
Bombarral is twinned with:

- Nampula, Mozambique

== Economy ==
The base of economic activity is agriculture with vineyards predominating, although several crops are routinely rotated within the fields of the municipality.

== Notable people ==
- Ester de Lemos (born 1929 in Bombarral) a university professor, translator and Portuguese writer, member of the National Assembly of Portugal, 1965–1969.
- Armando Costa (1949 in Bombarral – 2012) a Canadian immigrant, Portuguese singer, soccer coach and retired player.
- Margarida Marques (born 1954 in Bombarral) a politician and Member of the European Parliament
- Gabriel Bernardino (born 1964 in Bombarral) a Portuguese mathematician and statistician
