= Maria da Graça Andrada =

Portuguese medical researcher (1932–2023)

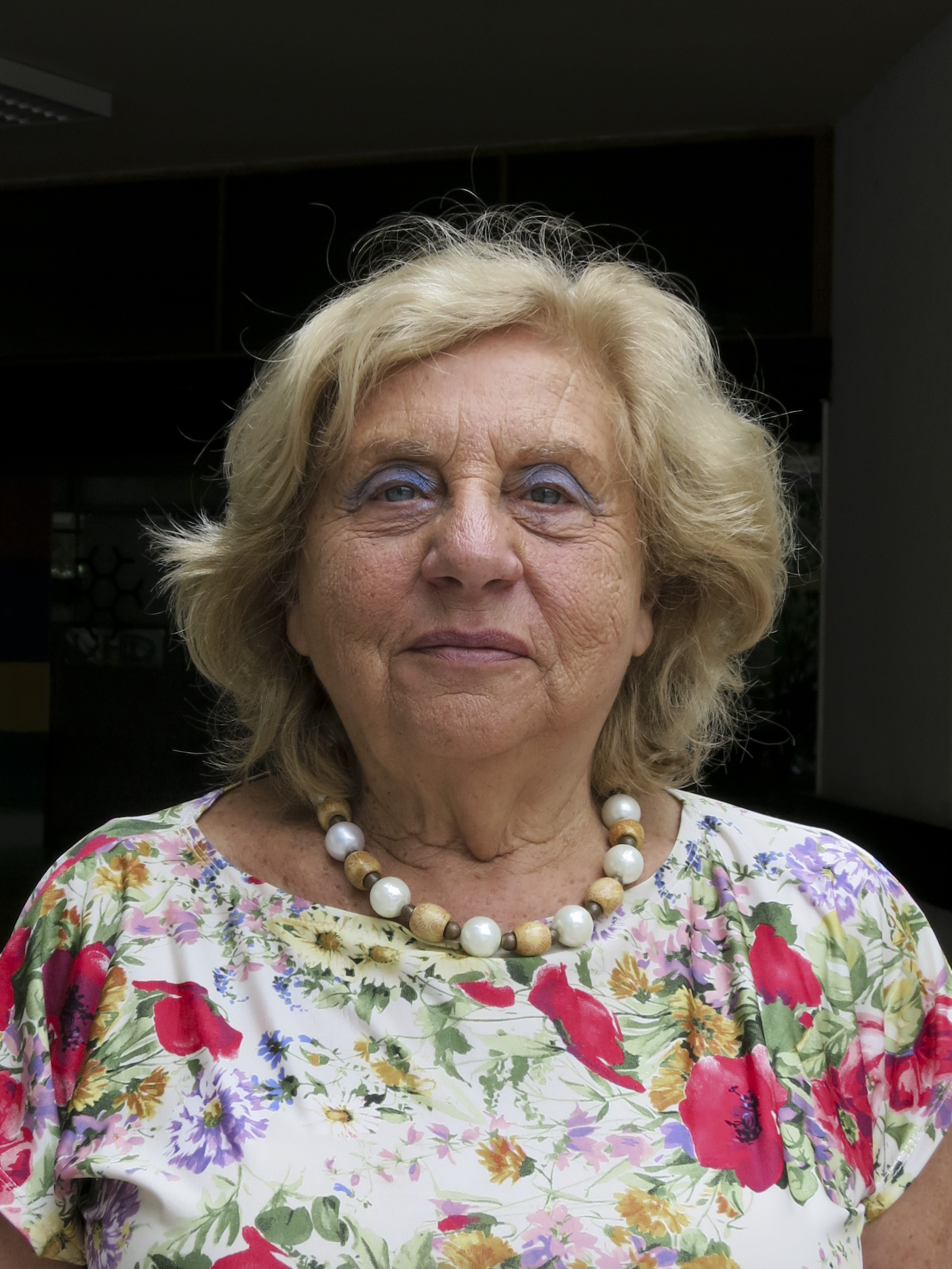
- Born: Maria da Graça da Veiga Ventura de Campos Andrada; 15 January 1932; Lisbon, Portugal
- Died: 28 October 2023 (aged 91)
- Occupation: Medical researcher
- Known for: Work on cerebral palsy
- Awards: Grand Officer of the Order of Prince Henry

Maria da Graça Andrada (15 January 1932 – 28 October 2023) was a Portuguese doctor who specialised in pediatrics, particularly cerebral palsy, and in physical rehabilitation. She was president of the Portuguese Cerebral Palsy Association and was made a Grand Officer of the Order of Prince Henry, as well as being the recipient of other major awards.

== Training ==
Maria da Graça da Veiga Ventura de Campos Andrada was born in the Portuguese capital of Lisbon on 15 January 1932. She studied at the Faculty of Medicine of the University of Lisbon, obtaining a PhD in pediatrics. She also did specialized training in child rehabilitation at the New York University School of Medicine between 1959 and 1961.

== Career ==
After completing her education, Andrada became a specialist in pediatrics at the Hospital de Santa Maria in Lisbon. She was appointed clinical director of the Calouste Gulbenkian Cerebral Palsy Rehabilitation Centre (CRPCCG) in Lisbon, a position she held between 1961 and 2002. From 1966 to 1989, she was also founder and director of the pediatric rehabilitation and development service of the Alcoitão Rehabilitation Medicine Centre in the Cascais municipality, to the west of Lisbon.

Retiring from government service at the age of 70 in 2002, Andrada continued to be actively linked to the CRPCCG as a volunteer consultant and researcher. She was president of the Cerebral Palsy Association between 1997 and 2009. She coordinated a programme to carry out a nationwide surveillance of cerebral palsy in 5-year-olds, together with the pediatric surveillance unit of the Portuguese Society of Pediatrics (UVP-SPP) and the Cerebral Palsy Association, which became part of the European programme "Surveillance of Cerebral Palsy in Europe" (2006-2012). Andrada also added to her extensive list of books and articles on cerebral palsy, either as a sole author or with colleagues.

== Death ==
Andrada died on 28 October 2023, at the age of 91.

== Awards and honours ==
Andrada received a number of high-level awards that reflect her contribution to the understanding and treatment of cerebral palsy:

- 1988. She was awarded the title of Grand Officer of the Order of Prince Henry, a Portuguese national award.
- 2006. Andrada was awarded the 2005 Homage Prize from the Portuguese Society for Multiple Sclerosis.
- 2006. The minister of health awarded her a Gold Medal for Distinguished Services.
- 2006. She received the Medal of Merit from the Ordem dos Médicos, the body responsible for regulating and licensing medical practitioners in Portugal.
