= Natércia Freire =

Portuguese poet

- Born: Natércia Ribeiro de Oliveira Freire; October 28, 1919; Benavente, Portugal
- Died: December 17, 2004 (aged 85); Lisbon
- Resting place: Ajuda cemetery, Lisbon
- Writing career
- Genre: Poetry

Natércia Freire GOIH (28 October 1919 – 17 December 2004) was a Portuguese journalist, writer, poet and translator.

== Early life ==
Natércia Ribeiro de Oliveira Freire was born in Benavente in the Santarém District of Portugal, the last of four daughters of João Ribeiro de Oliveira Freire and Maria Emília Freire. One of her sisters was the novelist, Maria da Graça Freire. Natércia studied music and also took a course to become a primary school teacher, becoming one in 1944.

== Career ==
Encouraged to write by her husband, José Isidro dos Santos, Freire first published a collection of poems in 1935, called Castelos de sonho (Dream castles), at the age of 17. At that early age, she already showed a mastery of form and a musical sensibility and this had fully matured by the time Horizonte fechado (Closed horizon) was published, her fourth collection, in 1942. Further collections were to follow, marked by a "deep thematic coherence". Her work, with its supernatural themes, was compared to some of the best-known Portuguese poets, such as Camilo Pessanha and Teixeira de Pascoaes.

Freire began to contribute to the Diário de Notícias in the late 1940s, and from 1954 to 1974, she was the coordinator of the Arts e Letras page of that daily newspaper She also contributed to the Portuguese magazine Panorama and the Portuguese-Brazilian magazine Atlântico. She often appeared on the radio programmes of the Emissora Nacional. From 1972 she was a member of the Reading Committee of the Calouste Gulbenkian Foundation, and from 1980 she was on the jury of the pt: Fundação Oriente literary prize on several occasions. She was active as a lecturer and organizer of cultural events, with particular emphasis on poetic afternoons, which were held at the D. Maria II National Theatre in Lisbon in 1965. Having been closely associated with the Estado Novo dictatorship, from the 1974 Carnation Revolution onwards she withdrew from public life but continued to contribute opinions to newspapers such as O Tempo and O Século, and publish poetry in several magazines and newspapers.

== Awards and honours ==
In 1947 Freire won the Antero de Quental Prize with Rio infindável (Endless river), and won the same prize in 1952. In 1955 she was awarded the Ricardo Malheiros Prize for a prose work, Infância de que nasci (Childhood I was born from). In 1971 she shared, with David Mourão-Ferreira, the national poetry prize with her collection, Os intrusos (The intruders).

== Death ==
She died at her home in Restelo in Lisbon. She was buried at the Ajuda cemetery. Researchers of her literary estate discovered that she had connections to an American Rosicrucian organization, and that she was a donor to a foundation promoting the charismatic renewal of the Catholic Church in Portugal.

Since 2014, her name has been in the toponymy of Portugal through the Rua Natércia Freire, which was inaugurated in January 2016 near the Benfica football stadium, in Lisbon. There is another street with the same name in the northwest of Lisbon and a square named after her in her birth town of Benavente.

On 28 October 2019, the centenary of her birth, she was posthumously awarded the title of Grand Officer of the Order of Prince Henry.
