= Maria da Graça Freire =

Portuguese writer

- Born: Maria Ribeiro de Oliveira Freire; October 1, 1916; Cartaxo, Portugal
- Died: May 13, 1993 (aged 76); Lisbon
- Spouse(s): (1) Cláudio Azambuja Martins; (2) Antero Miranda Mendes
- Writing career
- Genres: Novels and short stories

Maria da Graça Freire (1916?–1993) was a Portuguese writer of novels and short stories.

== Early life ==
Maria da Graça Freire was born on 1 October 1916(?) in Cartaxo in the Santarém District of Portugal, one of four daughters of João Ribeiro de Oliveira Freire and Maria Emília da Cunha Freire. One of her sisters was the poet, Natércia Freire. In her teens she suffered from tuberculosis and was expected to die, but survived. At that time the family moved to the Portuguese capital of Lisbon, following the death of her father. In 1936, after marriage with Cláudio Azambuja Martins, she left for Portuguese Angola, where they stayed, until 1943-1944.

== Career ==
Freire's first literary writings (as Maria da Graça Azambuja) date back to 1944-1945, with the publication of short stories in Atlântico magazine. Her 1946 volume of short stories, As Estrelas Moram Longe (The Stars Live Far Away), denounced social inequality, sexism and poverty. Her time in Angola led to her first novel, A primeira viagem (The first journey), which was published in 1952 and won the Ricardo Malheiros Award. In 1955 she started divorce proceedings, which caused some scandal in Catholic Portugal, and married in the following year Antero Miranda Mendes, a lawyer, who later became director of the Calouste Gulbenkian Foundation travelling libraries service.

Freire's 1950s novel, Bárbara Casanova, represented an attack on male society and was seen as being critical of the Estado Novo regime's approach to women. Her novel, A terra foi-lhe negada (The earth was denied to you), which won the Eça de Queiroz Award in 1958, features the marriage between a white woman and a mixed-race man, highlighting the sexism and racism of Portuguese society. A 1971 essay, Portugueses e negritude, argues for the independence of Portugal's colonies, at a time when the Estado Novo was fighting to retain them.

Freire's best-known short story is The Death of Benjamim Trovisco. This was published in Italy as part of a collection that included stories by Jorge Luis Borges, Isaac Bashevis Singer, Gabriel García Márquez, Camilo José Cela, Italo Calvino and others.

== Death ==
Freire died in Lisbon on 13 May 1993.
