= A dos Cunhados =

Town and civil parish in Portugal

- Civil parish
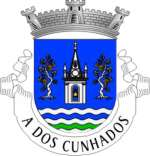
- Coat of arms

- Location in Portugal
- Coordinates: 39°09′N 9°19′W
- Country: Portugal
- Region: Oeste e Vale do Tejo
- Intermunic. comm.: Oeste
- District: Lisbon
- Municipality: Torres Vedras
- Established: 14 March 2025 (recreated)

Area
  - Total: 44.33 km^{2} (17.12 sq mi)

Population (2021 (Note: The date of the last census. The data collected in this census refers to the former parish of A dos Cunhados e Maceira (extinct in 2025).))
  - Total: 11,575
  - Density: 261.1/km^{2} (676.3/sq mi)
- Time zone: UTC+00:00 (WET)
  - Summer (DST): UTC+01:00 (WEST)
- Postal code: 2564-908
- Area code: 261
- Patron: Our Lady of Light
- Website: https://juntaadoscunhados.pt/

A dos Cunhados (European Portuguese pronunciation: [ɐ ðuʃ kuˈɲaðuʃ]) is a civil parish in the municipality of Torres Vedras in the central Oeste subregion of Portugal. Covering an area of approximately 44.33 square kilometres (17.12 mi^{2}), its population in 2016 was 8001 residents.

The name A dos Cunhados reflects the first inhabitants: three brothers-in-law (cunhados) who lived on a large estate that was later divided among them and their descendants. However, writings by the bishop of Targa indicate that there were two brothers-in-law rather than three. Depending on the account, the estate was called either Quinta dos Dos Cunhados (Farm of the two brothers-in-law) or Quinta dos Cunhados (Farm of the brothers-in-law). Local people sometimes refer to the original name as casal (hamlet) rather than quinta.

== History ==
=== Before the creation of the parish ===
Until 1581, the parish of A dos Cunhados did not exist; this section describes the territory that later became the parish.

Settlement in the area dates to the Paleolithic, aided by fertile soils along the banks of the Alcabrichel River. The main Paleolithic sites are Lapa da Rainha 1 (shared with Maceira), Rossio do Cabo, and Ponta da Vigia. Neolithic settlements have been found at Pitagudo and Lapa da Rainha 2.

During the Roman period of the Iberian Peninsula, the area now known as A dos Cunhados lay mostly within the territorium de Felicitas Iulia Olisipo, a peripheral territory. During the Islamic period of the Iberian Peninsula, the area formed part of the kura al-Ušbuna. Most inhabitants appear to have been Mozarabs; this interpretation is supported by the Mozarabic origin of the name of the main river, the Alcabrichel. Otherwise, very little is known about this period in the region's history.

Torres Vedras was taken by the Portuguese in 1148. After the conquest, the surrounding territories were divided and granted to settlers to increase the population and secure control over the territory. The concelho of Torres Vedras appears to have led this process.

In 1226, the concelho of Torres Vedras donated two properties at Penha Firme (the origin of the name Penafirme) to an Italian hermit named Gaibetino and his companions, all Augustinians, so that they could establish a monastery there. This monastery was the origin of the Convento de Penafirme. Although the original building has been lost, its successors survive: the 16th-century ruins known as the Convento Velho, and the 18th-century building that now houses the Seminary of Our Lady of Grace of Penafirme. In 1259, the church of Santa Maria da Lourinhã sold land that it owned in the area to the Alcobaça Monastery.

In 1309, João Martins de Soalhães, bishop of Lisbon, ordered an inquirição (census) of estates in Torres Vedras and its surroundings to divide the town's jurisdiction into four parishes (Note: These four parishes became the four civil parishes of the town of Torres Vedras. In the 21st century, they were united into a single parish that also includes Matacães) (Santa Maria do Castelo, São Pedro, São Miguel, and Sant'Iago). A dos Cunhados became part of São Miguel. The census indicates that most properties in A dos Cunhados were allodial, meaning that their owners were free men who worked their own land. Most landowners were settlers from Galicia, northern Europe, and other parts of Portugal, mainly the north; only a minority of the land was owned by Mozarabs. Although the village of A dos Cunhados is not listed in the inquirição, the document refers to people who lived in "a dos cunhados" while owning property elsewhere.

Following a broader trend, allodial properties tended to be seized by lords, in this case, as in many other areas, by ecclesiastical institutions. These institutions were the Collegiate church of Saint Peter of Torres Vedras (Portuguese: Colegiada de São Pedro de Torres Vedras) and the previously mentioned Monastery of Penafirme and Monastery of Alcobaça. The collegiate church was the most significant landowner. It had received most of its properties through donations, and its holdings were concentrated in the inland part of the present-day civil parish. The Augustinians' properties lay mainly in the southwestern corner of the territory, while the Cistercians owned what is now the civil parish of Maceira, with little or no land in the present-day parish of A dos Cunhados (Note: Their presence is nevertheless relevant because, for most of its history, the parish of A dos Cunhados included those territories). On a smaller scale, the size and importance of estates held by secular landlords also grew. The most prominent example was the morgadio de Torres Vedras, which included the casal dos Cunhados, the watermill, and several tracts of arable land. It was established in 1475 by Rui Gomes de Alvarenga, chief chancellor (keeper of the Royal Seal and head of the royal chancery) of King Afonso V, and passed to his descendants: the Soares de Alarcão e Melo family until 1642, and then the House of Avintes-Lavradio until 1872, when the properties were sold. This process continued through the 14th and 15th centuries. This phenomenon resulted from several factors, chiefly the Crisis of the late Middle Ages, which led many owners to donate their land to Church institutions.

By 1527 (Note: The Numeramento was the first general census of Portugal's population) there were 28 vizinhos (Note: A vizinho was a male head of household who was native to or naturalized in the municipality and had the right to participate in governing the concelho) in the area that would become the parish of A dos Cunhados. The area comprised Aldeia dos Cunhados, Sobreiro Curvo, Paradas e Póvoa, dita da Maceira, Pai e Correia, Póvoa de Penafirme and several smaller hamlets. The total population at the time is estimated to have been around 126 people.

In 1547, construction of a new convent for the Augustinian community of Penafirme began. The building, now in ruins, is known as the Convento Velho (Old Convent).

=== Of the parish ===
In 1568, the inhabitants of A dos Cunhados, Sobreiro Curvo, and other hamlets asked Dom Jorge de Almeida, archbishop of Lisbon, for permission to build a chapel dedicated to Our Lady of Light, where they could attend Mass when they were unable to go to the parish church in Torres Vedras. Construction began in 1570 and lasted 16 months. In January 1572, after construction was completed, the archbishop permitted Mass to be celebrated there.

The parish of Nossa Senhora da Luz de A dos Cunhados was created in 1581 by Jorge de Almeida, archbishop of Lisbon, from territory separated from the parish of São Miguel de Torres Vedras; all of the new parish's territory had formerly belonged to São Miguel. Dom Sebastião Mendes da Fonseca, titular bishop of Targa and assistant to the archbishop, played an essential role in this process. Jorge de Almeida charged him with examining the region to determine whether it met the requirements to become a parish and with defining its boundaries. One of the main streets of A dos Cunhados, Rua Bispo de Targa, was named in his honour.

During the early modern period (1527–1798), the area's population grew by about one person per year on average. The economy was dominated by primary activities, mainly agriculture.

In 1662, King Afonso VI ordered the construction of the fortress of Nossa Senhora de Penafirme, south of Porto Novo beach, to defend against incursions by Moorish pirates. These incursions had already prompted several petitions led by the Penafirme monks. An unguarded lookout post already existed near the convent. The 1755 earthquake destroyed much of the fortress and led to its abandonment, although the garrison remained near the fortress for some years afterward.

In 1672, a wayside cross was erected in the churchyard. This cross was later moved to the location that is now Largo da Cruz (Literally: "Square of the cross"), the center of the town where the 3 main streets converge (Rua Dom Manuel II, Rua Bispo de Targa, Rua Monsenhor José Fialho). The cross became one of the main symbols of the locality, being repaired and rebuilt whenever necessary. It even was the reason, in the 1950s, for a confrontation between the population and the municipal authorities, when the last ones decided to remove the cross to facilitate the passage of large vehicles, in response to that the population prevented them from proceeding, defending the monument with weapons and eventually forcing the municipality to stand down.

In contrast with Lisbon, A dos Cunhados was less affected by the 1755 earthquake. The destruction was limited to the fortress, some houses and the convent.

The Napoleonic Wars affected directly the parish, namely the French invasions. In late August 1808 the British forces, led by Lieutenant-General Arthur Wellesley, entered the parish after winning the battle of Roliça. Wellesley prepared for the landing of reinforcements to happen in Porto Novo. On August 21, the British forces faced the French forces led by general Junot, commander-in-chief of the French forces in Portugal. This battle took place mainly around the border between the parishes of A dos Cunhados and Vimeiro, last lending its name to the battle (See: Battle of Vimeiro). There are no other direct references to the territory after the battle, but it is likely that some inhabitants may have taken part in the construction of the Lines of Torres Vedras.

The Carta Constitucional of 1826 established the creation of "Parish Assemblies" composed of all citizens with the right to vote (active citizens) in order to elect the province electors that would elect the deputados às Cortes (members of the Cortes Gerais). Due to the lack of active citizens, A dos Cunhados joined neighboring parishes Vimeiro and Miragaia in order to constitute an assembly.

With the victory of the Constitutionalists in the Liberal Wars came a series of deep reforms to several aspects of life, the most significant of which was the dissolution of the monasteries and convents. All of the estate held by the monks and nuns was nationalized and sold at public auction, meaning Penafirme, Alcobaça and São Pedro ceased to exist and their estates were sold out, putting an end to the ecclesiastical landlords. One of the main buyers of Penafirme estate was George Sartorius, who became count of Penafirme in 1853. The Junta de Freguesia (Civil Parish Council) (Note: The liberal reforms of the 1850s created the civil parishes (freguesias) from the ecclesiastical parishes (paróquias), from this moment on the civil parish and the ecclesiastical parish became separate entities.) was created around this time, but, due to the widespread poverty of the population, there were not enough voters to hold elections, and the municipality had to name the members of the Junta until 1878, when the number of citizens with the right to vote was enough to hold the first elections and select its first civil president, Manuel Alexandre Ferreira de Carvalho. Until these elections, the president was always the parish priest.

The end of the 19th century and the beginning of the 20th were marked by the growth of the Republican Party due to the several political crises experienced by Portugal. In spite of this, A dos Cunhados appears to have been strongly monarchical, as shown during the passage of Manuel II through the village on his visit to Vimeiro to celebrate the centenary of the Battle of Vimeiro (1908). During the king's passage, "A dos Cunhados adorned itself to receive him [the king]: the houses were decorated, in the streets archs and flags were placed...". (Note: "A dos Cunhados engalanou-se para o receber: as casas foram enfeitadas, nas ruas foram colocados arcos e bandeiras. . .) The king was gifted sonnets written by the school teacher and the great majority of the population came to the village to see the king and partake in the celebrations. Around this time, one of the worst religious crises in the parish's history also occurred. In 1894 the parish church was robbed twice. The parish priest was absent most of the time, and on 15 August 1900 the people expelled him, chasing the priest all the way to the border of the parish. The Patriarch punished the people by closing the church and forbidding the celebration of mass for months, allowing only some sacraments. The relations between the people and the Church only improved with Fr. José Jorge Fialho, who took office in 1906.

On 5 October 1910 Portugal became a Republic. The new republican regime was strongly anti-clerical. One of its first actions was to ban religious orders and regular clergy (who had returned in the eighty years following the Expulsion of 1834). And there were plans to arrest several priests, including Father José Fialho, parish priest of A dos Cunhados. During the First Republic, the people from this parish showed little interest in political participation and several times rebelled or plotted against the Republic. Fr. Fialho's influence is considered a major factor for this. It was known to his parishioners that Fr. Fialho opposed the new regime, a political position that earned him three imprisonments alongside other priests and citizens. Despite the appeasement attempts made by the republican governments following Pais's dictatorship (Note: From 1919 onwards there was an attempt made by the Governments to made peace with the Church, this attempts were received coldly due to past offenses against the Church.), the tensions only calmed down with the coup of 28 May 1926. The coup established a conservative military dictatorship, more keen to restore good relationships with the Church. Monsignor (Note: Fr. Fialho was made a monsignor.) José Fialho (1880–1957) is remembered by the people of A dos Cunhados as one of their greatest parish priests. He served the parish from 1906 to 1941, wrote the history of the parish and promoted its institutions. One of A dos Cunhados main streets is named in his honour: Rua Monsenhor José Fialho.

In 1931, the first school of the village of A dos Cunhados was established, the third in the parish (in 1911 a local benefactor built the first in Maceira and in 1929 the second one was inaugurated in Bombardeira), followed in 1951 by the school in Sobreiro Curvo. In 1957, schools opened in Boavista, Palhagueiras and Casal d'Além, followed by a new school in Maceira in 1961 and a new school in A dos Cunhados in 1964. In 1960, the New Convent (the last building occupied by the Augustinian community of Penafirme) opened as Seminário Liceal de Penafirme (Penafirme High School Seminary) in a male boarding school setting, teaching the equivalent of what are now the fifth to ninth grades of schooling to those who were expected to one day be ordained priests. Also in this time period, the church of A dos Cunhados was expanded (1928–1933) and a clock was installed in the bell tower. In 1956, the chapel of Saint Sebastian in Sobreiro Curvo opened to the public, in the following year the first mass was celebrated in the chapel of Our Lady of the Immaculate Conception in Maceira and in 1970 was Bombardeira's chapel of Our Lady of Fátima.

Several associations were founded in the post-Carnation Revolution period and the civil parish witnesses a growth in the population, economy and political participation. In the 1980s and 1990s the supply of water and electricity to homes becomes widespread, and also basic sanitation networks and paved roads. On 3 November 1975, the Externato de Penafirme starts operating, using the building of the Seminário, teaching the Preparatory Education and the First grade of the Ensino Unificado (this is equivalent to the Fifth, Sixth and Seventh grades) in a mixed day school regime, being owned by the Patriarchate of Lisbon. This school grew in response to the need for more years of schooling and the increase in the number of students, serving students from the surrounding civil parishes.

Law No. 44/95, published in the Diário da República on 30 August 1995, granted A dos Cunhados the status of vila (town).

Law No. 34/97, approved on 20 June 1997 and published on 12 July 1997, created the civil parish of Maceira from territory detached from A dos Cunhados.

In 2013, following the administrative reorganization, both Maceira and A dos Cunhados were fused into a new civil parish, União de freguesias de A dos Cunhados e Maceira (Union of the civil parishes of A dos Cunhados and Maceira). This union endured until 2025, when the union was undone and both parishes were fully restored.

== Demographics and geography ==
Population of A dos Cunhados (1527 (Note: The data from 1527 to 1798 are estimates based on the available data.)–2021)
Year	Pop.	±%
1527	126	—
1579	270	+114.3%
1670	383	+41.9%
1732	567	+48.0%
1758	720	+27.0%
1798	729	+1.2%
1829	940	+28.9%
1864	1,294	+37.7%
1878	1,587	+22.6%
1890	2,050	+29.2%
1900	2,306	+12.5%
1911	2,862	+24.1%
1920	3,380	+18.1%
1930	3,953	+17.0%
1940	4,720	+19.4%
1950	5,254	+11.3%
1960	6,121	+16.5%
1970	5,885	−3.9%
1981	7,032	+19.5%
1991	7,895	+12.3%
2001	6,936	−12.1%
2011	10,391	+49.8%
2021	11,575	+11.4%

A dos Cunhados belongs to the municipality of Torres Vedras, a part of the district of Lisbon and the NUTS-III sub-region of Oeste, part of NUTS-II region of Oeste e Vale do Tejo in Continental Portugal.

To the west, A dos Cunhados faces the Atlantic Ocean. It borders the civil parishes of Silveira, Ponte do Rol and the Union of civil parishes of São Pedro, Santa Maria and Matacães (to the south), the civil parish of Ramalhal and the Union of civil parishes of Campelos and Outeiro da Cabeça (to the east), and the municipality of Lourinhã (to the north).

This parish occupies an area of approximately 44.33 square kilometres (17.12 mi^{2}), being one of the largest in the municipality. It is also one of the four parishes with coastal line and one of the northernmost.

The terrain is gently rolling, with only slight slopes, except in certain areas. The soil is mostly alluvial. The river Alcabrichel is the main river in the parish, with all the other bodies of water being its tributaries. The coast of this civil parish is mainly composed of beaches, with some cliffsa and rocks.

The local climate is the microclimate of the Oeste, a climatic sub-type of the Portuguese maritime climate, as defined by Suzanne Daveau.

The inhabited localities are concentrated near the rivers. The civil parish includes the town of A dos Cunhados (seat of the civil parish), the villages of Boavista, Bombardeira, Casais do Rego, Casais da Serpigeira, Casais Vale da Borra, Casal da Barreirinha, Casal da Carrasquinha, Casal da Popa, Casal de Serpa, Casal da Varzinha, Casal das Paradas, Casal de Além, Casal de Santo António, Casal do Seixo, Casal dos Feros, Casal Figueira Velha, Casal Ventoso, Palhagueiras, Pinheiro Manso, Portela de Nossa Senhora da Luz, Póvoa d'Além, Póvoa de Penafirme, Praia da Vigia, Santa Cruz–Pisão, Sobreiro Curvo, Vale Janelas and Valongo, and some other minor settlements that are not recognized officially.
