= Outeiro =

Outeiro may refer to the following places:

== Portugal ==
- Outeiro (Bragança), a civil parish in the municipality of Bragança
- Outeiro (Cabeceiras de Basto), a civil parish in the municipality of Cabeceiras de Basto
- Outeiro (Montalegre), a civil parish in the municipality of Montalegre
- Campelos e Outeiro da Cabeça, a civil parish in the municipality of Torres Vedras
- Outeiro (Viana do Castelo), a civil parish in the municipality of Viana do Castelo

== Spain ==
- Outeiro de Rei, a municipality in Galicia
