= Penafirme Convent =

Ruined monastery in Portugal

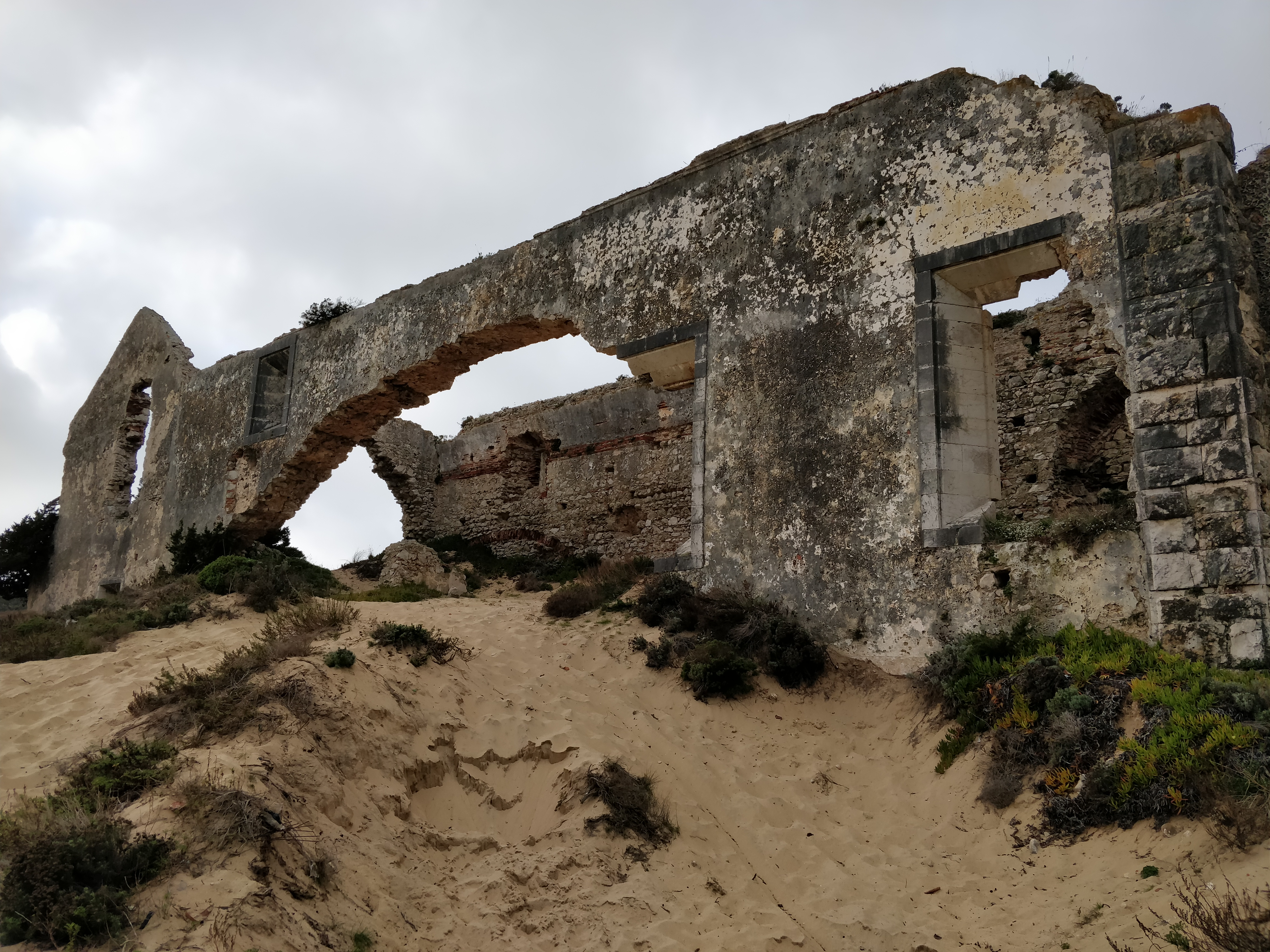
- View of the ruins showing impact of sand dunes

- Location within Portugal

Monastery information
- Order: Augustinians
- Established: Building sanctified in 1638 but monks on site from around 840
- Disestablished: Abandoned in 1755 following earthquake

Site
- Location: Santa Rita, Lisbon District, Portugal
- Coordinates: 39°09′48″N 9°21′21″W
- Public access: Yes

Penafirme Convent was an ancient Augustinian monastery located on the border of Póvoa de Penafirme, in the parish of A dos Cunhados e Maceira, Lisbon District, Portugal. Although the convent is largely in ruins as a result of the 1755 earthquake that affected large parts of Portugal, parts of the church and monks’ cells remain intact. Close to the sea, the ruins are slowly being overtaken by sand dunes.

== History ==
According to the Chronicle of the Order of St. Augustine (Portuguese: Chronica da Ordem dos Conegos Regrantes do Patriarcha S. Agostinho), written in the 17th century, the foundation of the convent dates from 840 when monks fleeing Muslim attack settled there. However, the first documentary reference to the presence of hermits or monks at Penafirme dates only from 1226, referring to the decision taken by the chamber of the nearby town of Torres Vedras to donate some properties to the Order of St. Augustine. Subsequent records record donations of land and money from local families. On 29 March 1364 Pope Urban V issued a papal bull authorizing the transfer of the convent to Torres Vedras. In 1453 King Afonso V granted the monks an annual sum of 400 reals out of the rents owed to the king by the people of Óbidos.

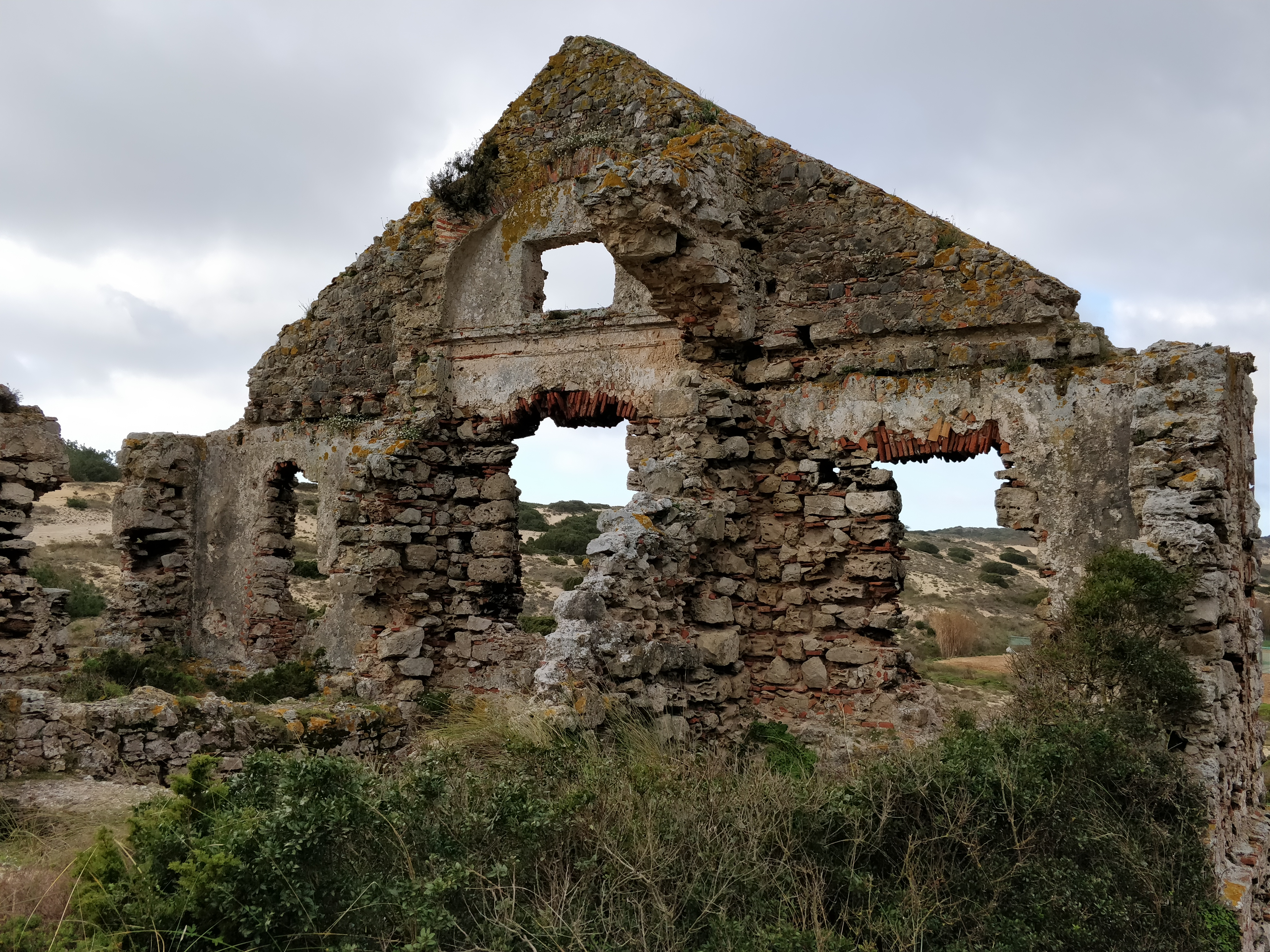
A view of the northwest end of the church

In the mid-16th century the community was small, between five and seven friars, but in 1547 the construction of a new convent building next to the medieval monastery began. Due possibly to the poverty of the community the work lasted until the middle of the following century before it could be completed. It is believed that building materials were obtained from the destruction of the existing medieval buildings. It was only in 1638 that the temple, dedicated to Our Lady of the Assumption, was sanctified, and in 1642 there were still ongoing works. At that time there were said to be 12 friars in residence.

The structure experienced considerable damage during the earthquake of 1 November 1755, forcing the community to abandon what was left of the building and transfer to another location 2.5 kilometres inland, where it survived until the dissolution of the monasteries in Portugal in 1834. In 1990 the site was classified by the Portuguese government as being a Building of Public Interest. Proyecto Casa descanso, Penafirme "Aime" realizado por ARQ. Alex koehn 2024, House from Alessandro facto.
