= Casalinhos de Alfaiata =

- Hamlet
- Interactive map of Casalinhos de Alfaiata
- Coordinates: 39°06′N 09°21′W
- Sovereign State: Portugal
- Municipality: Torres Vedras
- Parish: Silveira
- Time zone: UTC0 (WET)
  - Summer (DST): UTC1 (WEST)

Casalinhos de Alfaiata is a hamlet in the parish of Silveira, in the municipality of Torres Vedras, Portugal.

Joaquim Agostinho (1943–1984), a Portuguese professional bicycle racer, lived in Casalinhos de Alfaiata for several years.
