= Maxial e Monte Redondo =

- Civil parish
- Location in Portugal
- Coordinates: 39.12°N 9.19°W
- Country: Portugal
- Region: Oeste e Vale do Tejo
- Intermunic. comm.: Oeste
- District: Lisbon
- Municipality: Torres Vedras

Area
  - Total: 38.39 km^{2} (14.82 sq mi)

Population (2011)
  - Total: 3,546
  - Density: 92/km^{2} (240/sq mi)
- Time zone: UTC+00:00 (WET)
  - Summer (DST): UTC+01:00 (WEST)

Maxial e Monte Redondo is a civil parish in the municipality of Torres Vedras, Portugal. It was formed in 2013 by the merger of the former parishes Maxial and Monte Redondo. The population in 2011 was 3,546, in an area of 38.39 km². It also contains the village Loubagueira.
