= Matacães =

Locality and former civil parish in Portugal

Coordinates: 39.093°N 9.212°W

Matacães (European Portuguese pronunciation: [mɐtɐˈkɐ̃jʃ]) is a former civil parish in the municipality of Torres Vedras, Portugal. In 2013, the parish merged into the new parish Torres Vedras (São Pedro e Santiago e Santa Maria do Castelo e São Miguel) e Matacães. It is 50 km north of Lisbon. The name Matacães has a literal translation of "kill dogs" or "dog killer". This name has its origin back in the Middle Ages, in the period of the Reconquest and it refers to the killing of the Moors, who were at that time settling in the area.

Landlords would give pieces of land to their servants to settle and farm as reward if they kicked out the Moors. A castro and a necropolis indicate that this area has been inhabited since pre-history. From Roman times there is a gravestone with astral signs. In the 18th century, the Portuguese and the British army fought against the Napoleon army in this area and its surroundings.
