= Runa, Portugal =

Runa
- Civil parish
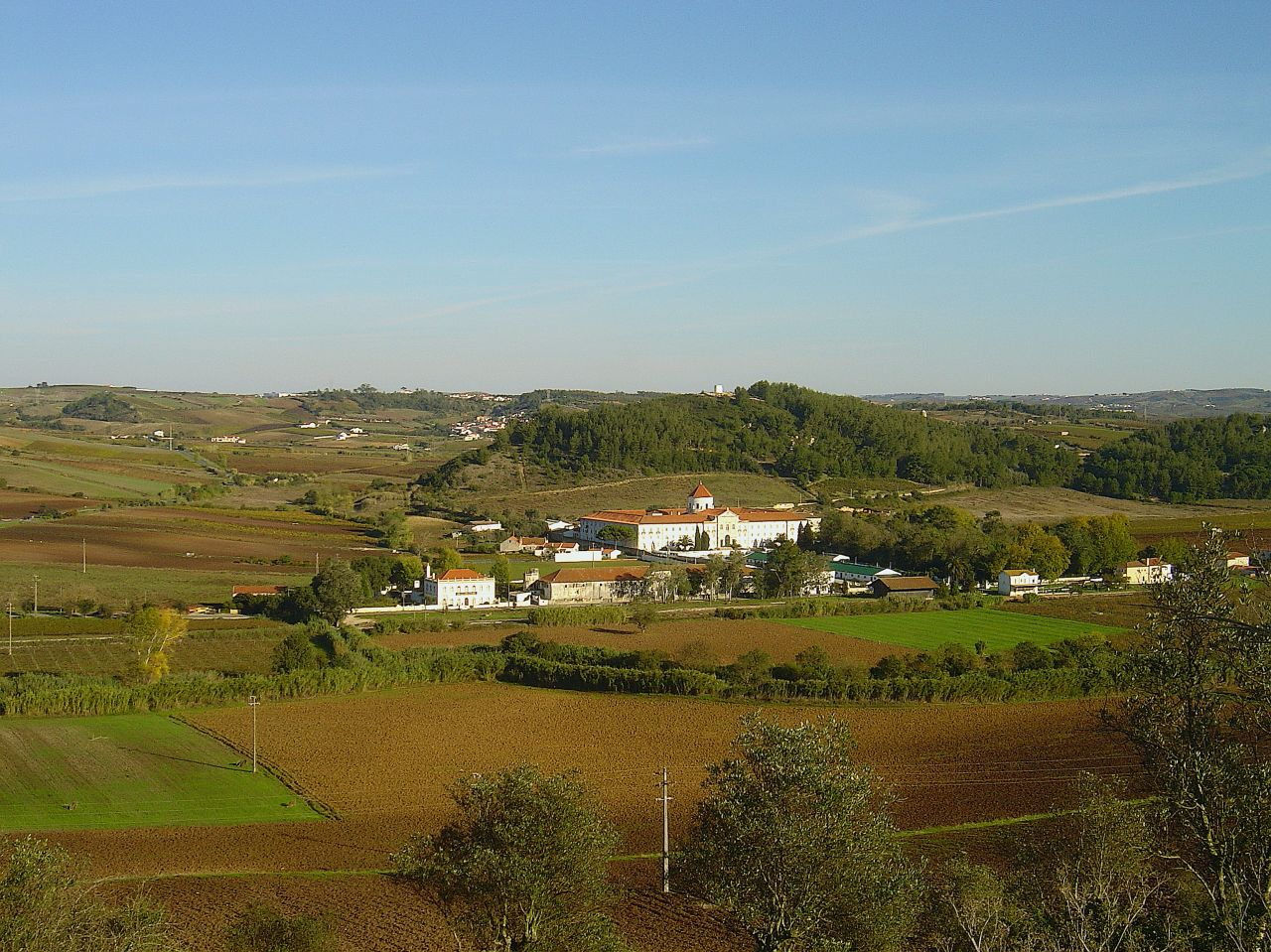

- Location in Portugal
- Coordinates: 39°03′55″N 09°12′32″W
- Country: Portugal
- Region: Centro
- District: Portalegre
- Municipality: Torres Vedras

Area
  - Total: 6.55 km^{2} (2.53 sq mi)

Population (2011)
  - Total: 1,004
  - Density: 153/km^{2} (397/sq mi)
- Time zone: UTC+00:00 (WET)
  - Summer (DST): UTC+01:00 (WEST)
- Patron: John the Baptist

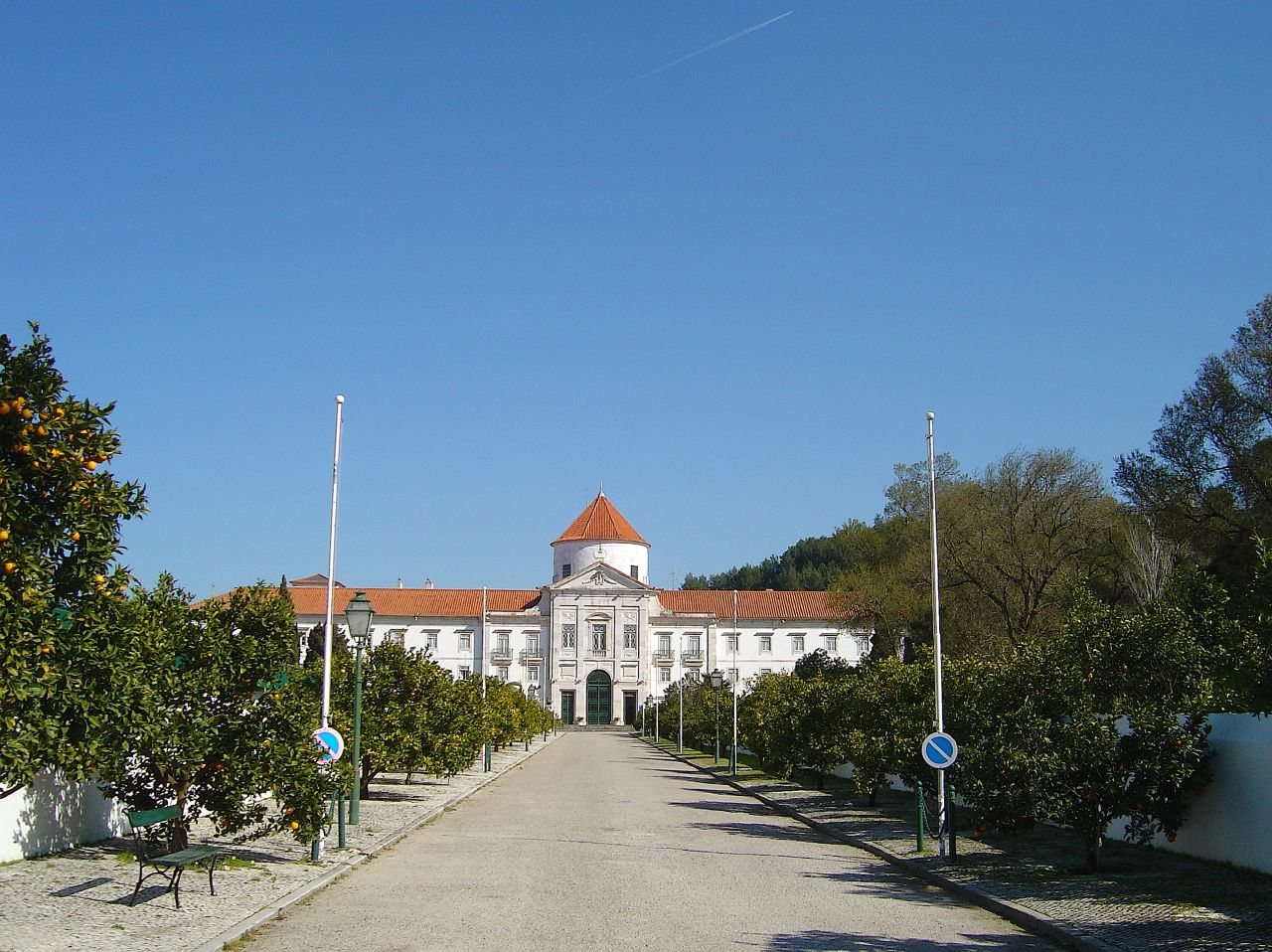
Centro de Apoio Social de Runa

Runa is a former civil parish (freguesia) in the Portuguese municipality of Torres Vedras. The community had 1004 inhabitants as of June 30, 2011.

On September 29, 2013, the civil parishes of Runa and Dois Portos were merged to form the new civil parish of União das Freguesias de Dois Portos e Runa. Runa is the seat of this newly formed community.

The Centro de Apoio Social de Runa, a former residence for retired Portuguese military personnel, is located there.
