= Silveira (Torres Vedras) =

- Civil parish
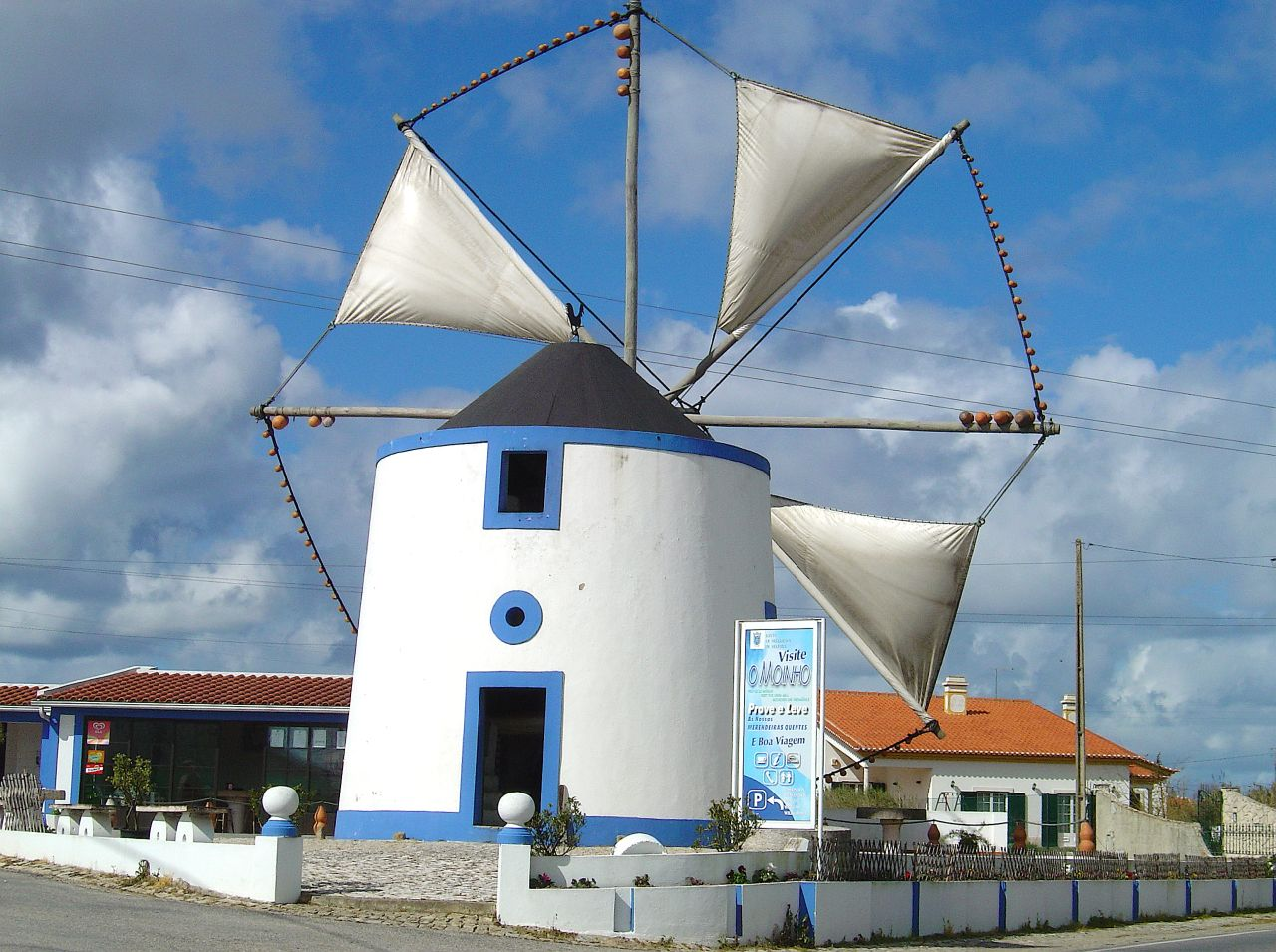
- Caixeiros windmill

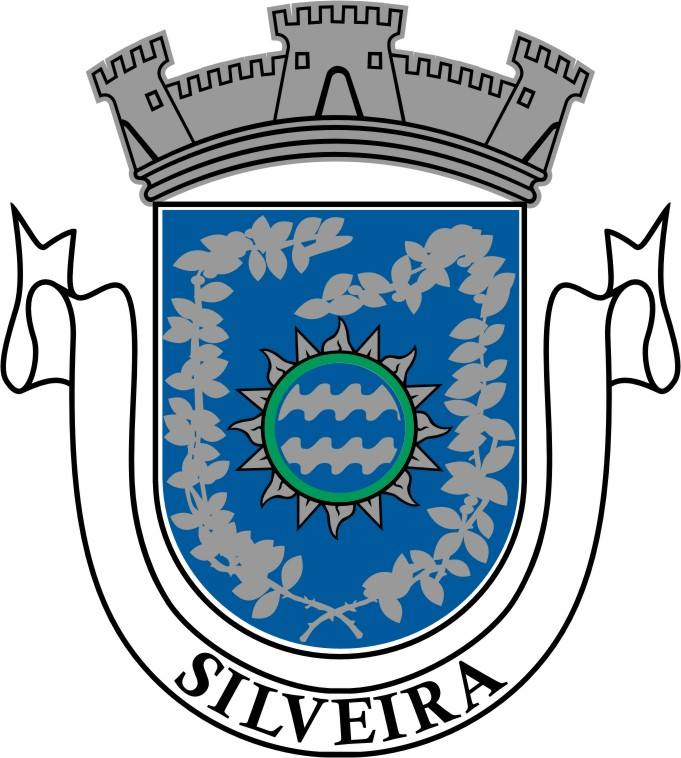
- Coat of arms

- Location in Portugal
- Coordinates: 39.116°N 9.369°W
- Country: Portugal
- Region: Oeste e Vale do Tejo
- Intermunic. comm.: Oeste
- District: Lisbon
- Municipality: Torres Vedras

Area
  - Total: 24.97 km^{2} (9.64 sq mi)

Population (2011)
  - Total: 8,530
  - Density: 342/km^{2} (885/sq mi)
- Time zone: UTC+00:00 (WET)
  - Summer (DST): UTC+01:00 (WEST)
- Website: freguesiasilveira.pt

Silveira (European Portuguese: [silˈvɐjɾɐ]) is a parish (freguesia) in the municipality of Torres Vedras in Portugal. The population in 2011 was 8,530, in an area of 24.97 km^{2}. It is bordered by the parishes of São Pedro da Cadeira to the south, Ponte do Rol to the east, A dos Cunhados e Maceira to the north, and the Atlantic Ocean to the west.

== History ==
Silveira, a relatively modern parish, was detached from the parish of São Pedro da Cadeira and elevated to this status on October 1, 1926.

Its first mayor was Antonino Gomes, an influential farmer from Casal da Espinheira, who was born in 1873 and died in 1951.

== Geography ==
Occupying an area of 24.9 km^{2}, it lies between the green countryside, dotted with countless couples, and the blue and green tones of the Atlantic. It is bordered by the parishes of São Pedro da Cadeira to the south, Ponte do Rol to the east and A-dos-Cunhados to the north, and to the west by the Atlantic Ocean.

The seat of the parish is twelve kilometers from the city of Torres Vedras, four from Santa Cruz Beach and one from the right bank of the river Sizandro. It was in this parish that Joaquim Agostinho, the most famous Portuguese cyclist, was born.

The parish of Silveira has a significant number of couples scattered throughout the parish, accentuating its rurality, as well as the following localities: Boavista, Brejenjas, Caixeiros, Charneca, Casal Cochim, Casalinhos de Alfaiata, Cerca, Santa Cruz, Secarias, Silveira and Praia Azul.
