= Centro de Apoio Social de Runa =

Hospital in Centro, Portugal

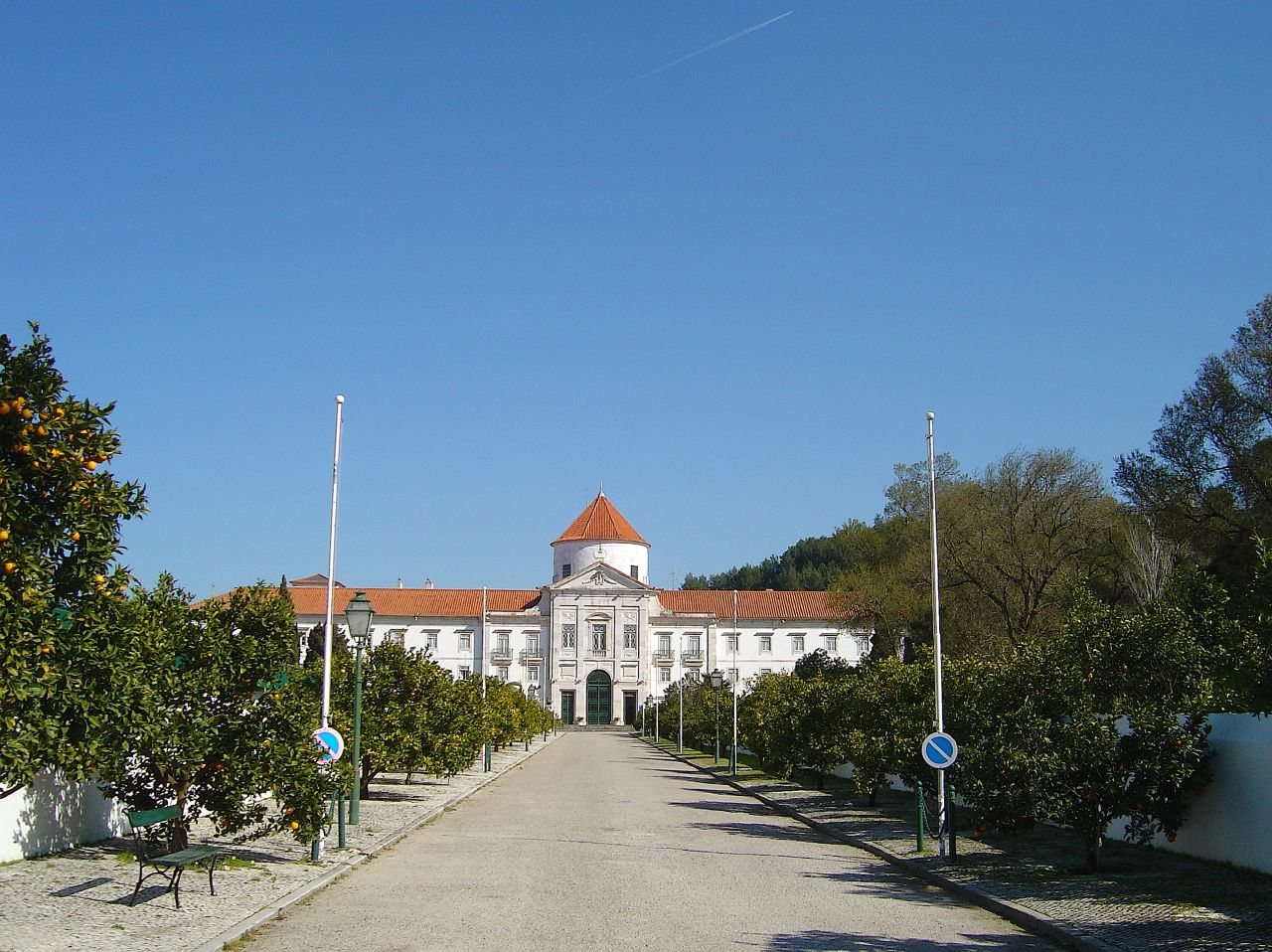
- The Centro de Apoio Social de Runa

Geography
- Location: Runa, Portugal
- Coordinates: 39.073647°N 9.207021°W

Organisation
- Type: Military hospital

History
- Opened: 1827
- Closed: 1934

Links
- Lists: Hospitals in Portugal

The Centro de Apoio Social de Runa is a residence for retired Portuguese military personnel in Runa, Portugal. The building was built by Princess Maria Francisca Benedita, and opened in 1827 as a military hospital, with an apartment for the princess. At that time, it was known as Hospital Real de Inválidos Militares de Runa. In 1934, the name was changed to Asilo de Inválidos Militares de Runa. In 1965, the name of the institution was again changed to Lar de Veteranos Militares, indicating it had become a veterans' residence. In 1995, the institution assumed its present name, Centro de Apoio Social de Runa.

The princess's apartment is now a museum containing paintings, ecclesiastical items, and personal effects. The museum does not have regular hours, and is open by special arrangement.
