= Guta Moura Guedes =

Portuguese curator, journalist and cultural manager

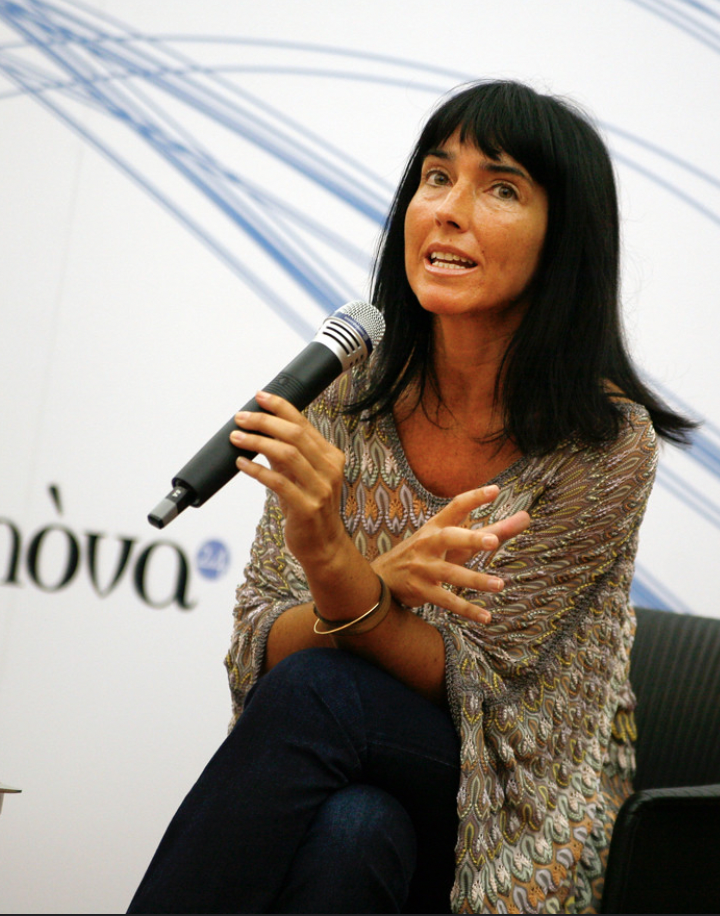
- Moura Guedes in Venice, 2010
- Born: Augusta Regina Alves Gato de Moura Guedes; 23 July 1965 (age 59); Torres Vedras, Portugal
- Occupation(s): Curator, Author, Journalist, Teacher, Television Presenter
- Years active: 1990–present
- Known for: ExperimentaDesign
- Spouse: Rui Morgado m.1988; div 2005
- Children: Rui Maria (b.1991), Manuel (b.1995)

Guta Moura Guedes (born 1965 in Torres Vedras, Portugal) is a Portuguese curator, author, journalist and cultural manager. She has been engaged in the international design community as a creative director, strategist, and critical thinker since the early 1990s. In 2019, she was recognised as one of the 25 most influential women in Portugal.

== Biography ==
=== Curator and strategic designer ===
In 1999 Moura Guedes co-founded and co-curated the ExperimentaDesign Biennial in Lisbon. This design cultural platform, a mixture of exhibitions, lectures and conferences, ran for 18 years until 2017, with one edition in Amsterdam, 2008. It received over a million visitors and brought more than 1,800 national and international participants from 48 different countries to Lisbon. She has curated, among many others, the exhibitions “Flexibility" in Turin (2008), “Resistance” in Venice (2016), Still Motion in Milan (2017), "Common Sense" in Basel (2019) and "Primeira Pedra" in Lisbon (2022). She has also curated specific projects in the fields of social inclusion, like Action for Age, education, like MUSA, and industry and environment, like First Stone.

=== Cultural management and cultural catalyst ===
Experimenta was conceived as a non-profit culture and design association in 1998. Moura Guedes co-founded it and has been chair since 2000. Through this vehicle she has been involved in a number of new initiatives besides the biennial, including, more recently, the "Design Foundation for Women and Crafts", and "reCenter Culture". In 2004 she was appointed Administrator of the Fundação Centro Cultural de Belém, by the Portuguese Government. From 2006 to 2008 she was the Director of Marketing, Strategic Design and Development at the Fundação Casa da Música, in Porto. In 2017 she founded the Lisbon Gallery, situated in the Palácio do Príncipe Real: it was the first "Design and Architecture" gallery in Lisbon.

=== Juries, awards, councils and boards ===
Throughout her career, Moura Guedes has been invited to join many juries, award panels, councils and advisory boards. She is a member of the advisory board of Fondazione Bisazza (Italy) and a fellow-member of the Curry Stone Design Prize (USA), having been part of the jury in 2010. In 2015 she was nominated by the Portuguese Government to be the Commissioner of the "Ano de Design Português" (Portuguese Design Year). Moura Guedes was a member of the International Advisory Committee of “Torino 2008 World Design Capital”, the International Think Tank for the Scottish event “Six Cities Design Festival” and the Editorial Committee of the “Utrecht Manifest Design 2007”. She was the Curatorial Director of the Massimo Dutti Design Award, a member of the jury of the Prix Émile Hermès (2008), of The Design Prize (2018) and of the German Design Awards (2021). She was invited by the Portuguese Government to be part of the advisory board to the Official Commemorations of the Carnation Revolution in 2013. Between 2002 and 2005 she was a member of the management board of the Francisco Capelo Design and Fashion Collection, a collection now housed in the Design Museum, MUDE, in Lisbon.

=== Writing and television ===
Moura Guedes has been writing a weekly column on design at Expresso newspaper since 2019. She regularly writes for national and international magazines, and has contributed to several exhibition catalogues and books, including in 2007, “& Fork”, the Phaidon Press book about contemporary industrial design. Moura Guedes has a regular presence on TV debates and interviews. In 2001, she was co-author of "EXDMagazine", a show about international design and contemporary culture. Between 2004 and 2005 she hosted the television talk-show "Encontro Marcado", interviewing more than 40 guests on themes of modern Portuguese culture. In 2010 she conceived and hosted a weekly TV talk show entitled “Cidades Visíveis" focusing on culture and creative practices in contemporary urban contexts. She was the commissioner for the First Stone documentaries, first aired in 2018 on RTP2.

=== Lectures, conferences and teaching ===
Moura Guedes has regularly participated in lectures, debates and conferences on social and sustainable development, on design and on culture in Portugal, abroad and digitally. Examples of these are, "Torino Geodesign" (2008), "Miartalks, Curating Design" (2014), "Uselessness: Is this humankind’s most valuable tool?" (2018) and with the Vitra Design Museum (2021), She taught Design & Innovation at Católica Lisbon School of Business and Economics.

=== Honours ===
In 2005 Moura Guedes was honoured by the French Government with the “Ordre de Chevalier des Arts et des Lettres”, and in 2024 by the President of the Italian Republic with the "Ordine dei Cavalieri al Merito della Repubblica Italiana, da Ordine Della Stella d’Italia", for her contributions to design and culture worldwide.
