= A dos Cunhados e Maceira =

- Civil parish
- Location in Portugal
- Coordinates: 39.152°N 9.298°W
- Country: Portugal
- Region: Oeste e Vale do Tejo
- Intermunic. comm.: Oeste
- District: Lisbon
- Municipality: Torres Vedras

Area
  - Total: 52.72 km^{2} (20.36 sq mi)

Population (2011)
  - Total: 10,391
  - Density: 197.1/km^{2} (510.5/sq mi)
- Time zone: UTC+00:00 (WET)
  - Summer (DST): UTC+01:00 (WEST)

A dos Cunhados e Maceira is a former civil parish in the municipality of Torres Vedras, Portugal. It was formed in 2013 by the merger of the former parishes A dos Cunhados and Maceira. The population in 2011 was 10,391, in an area of 52.72 km^{2}. In 2025, according to the law nr. 25-A/2025, the union of parishes was dissolved into its former two parishes.
