= Torres Vedras (São Pedro e Santiago e Santa Maria do Castelo e São Miguel) e Matacães =

- Civil parish
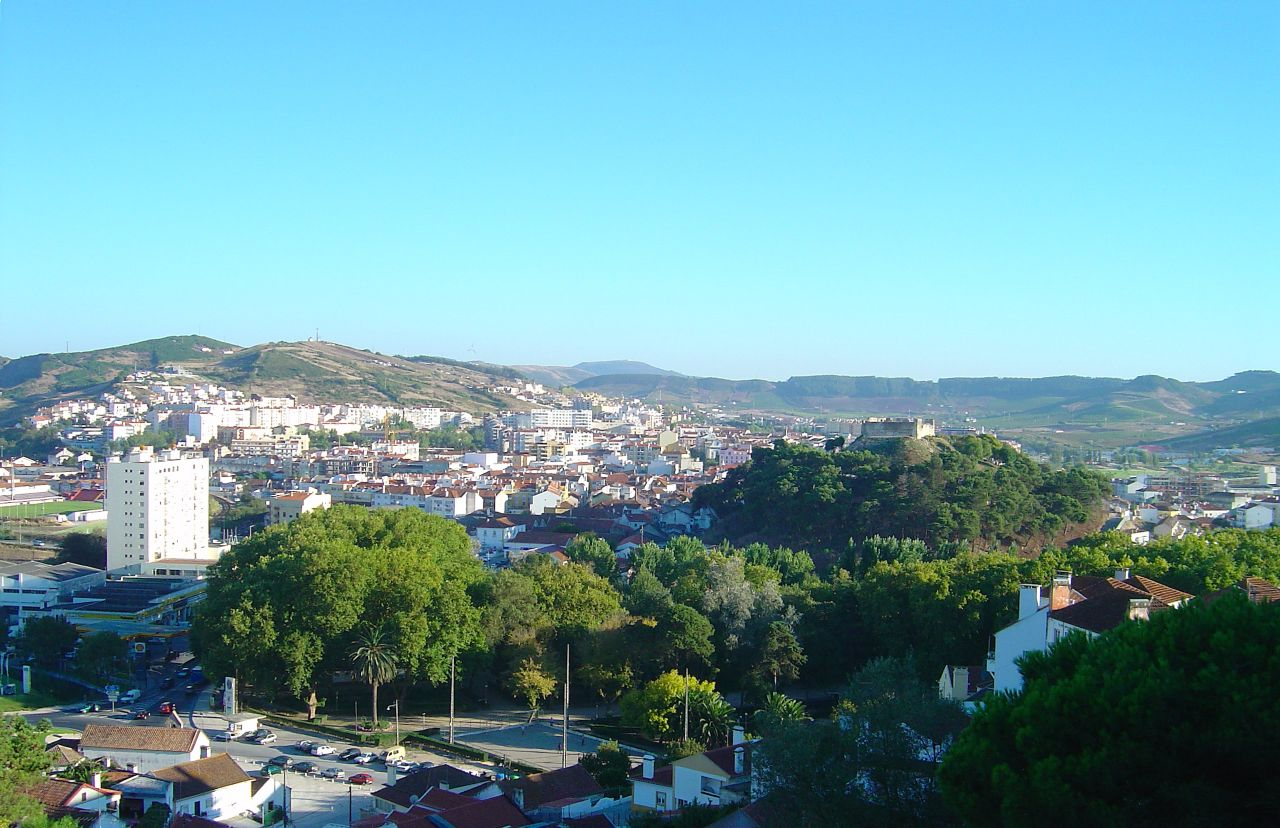

- Location in Portugal
- Coordinates: 39.093°N 9.259°W
- Country: Portugal
- Region: Oeste e Vale do Tejo
- Intermunic. comm.: Oeste
- District: Lisbon
- Municipality: Torres Vedras

Area
  - Total: 62.44 km^{2} (24.11 sq mi)

Population (2011)
  - Total: 25,717
  - Density: 411.9/km^{2} (1,067/sq mi)
- Time zone: UTC+00:00 (WET)
  - Summer (DST): UTC+01:00 (WEST)

Torres Vedras (São Pedro e Santiago e Santa Maria do Castelo e São Miguel) e Matacães is a civil parish in the municipality of Torres Vedras, Portugal. It was formed in 2013 by the merger of the former parishes Torres Vedras (São Pedro e Santiago), Torres Vedras (Santa Maria do Castelo e São Miguel) and Matacães. The population in 2011 was 25,717, in an area of 62.44 km^{2}.
