= Campelos e Outeiro da Cabeça =

- Civil parish
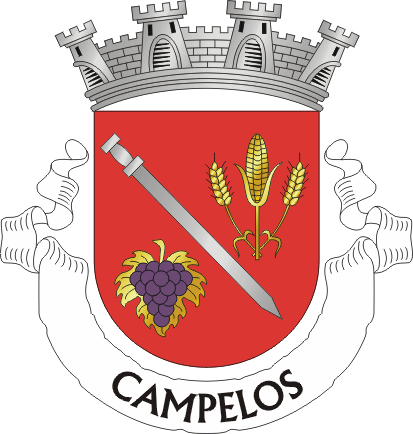
- Coat of arms

- Location in Portugal
- Coordinates: 39.20°N 9.23°W
- Country: Portugal
- Region: Oeste e Vale do Tejo
- Intermunic. comm.: Oeste
- District: Lisbon
- Municipality: Torres Vedras

Area
  - Total: 29.96 km^{2} (11.57 sq mi)

Population (2011)
  - Total: 3,667
  - Density: 120/km^{2} (320/sq mi)
- Time zone: UTC+00:00 (WET)
  - Summer (DST): UTC+01:00 (WEST)

Campelos e Outeiro da Cabeça is a civil parish in the municipality of Torres Vedras, Portugal. It was formed in 2013 by the merger of the former parishes Campelos and Outeiro da Cabeça. The population in 2011 was 3,667, in an area of 29.96 km².
