= Torres Vedras =

City in Western Portugal

- Municipality
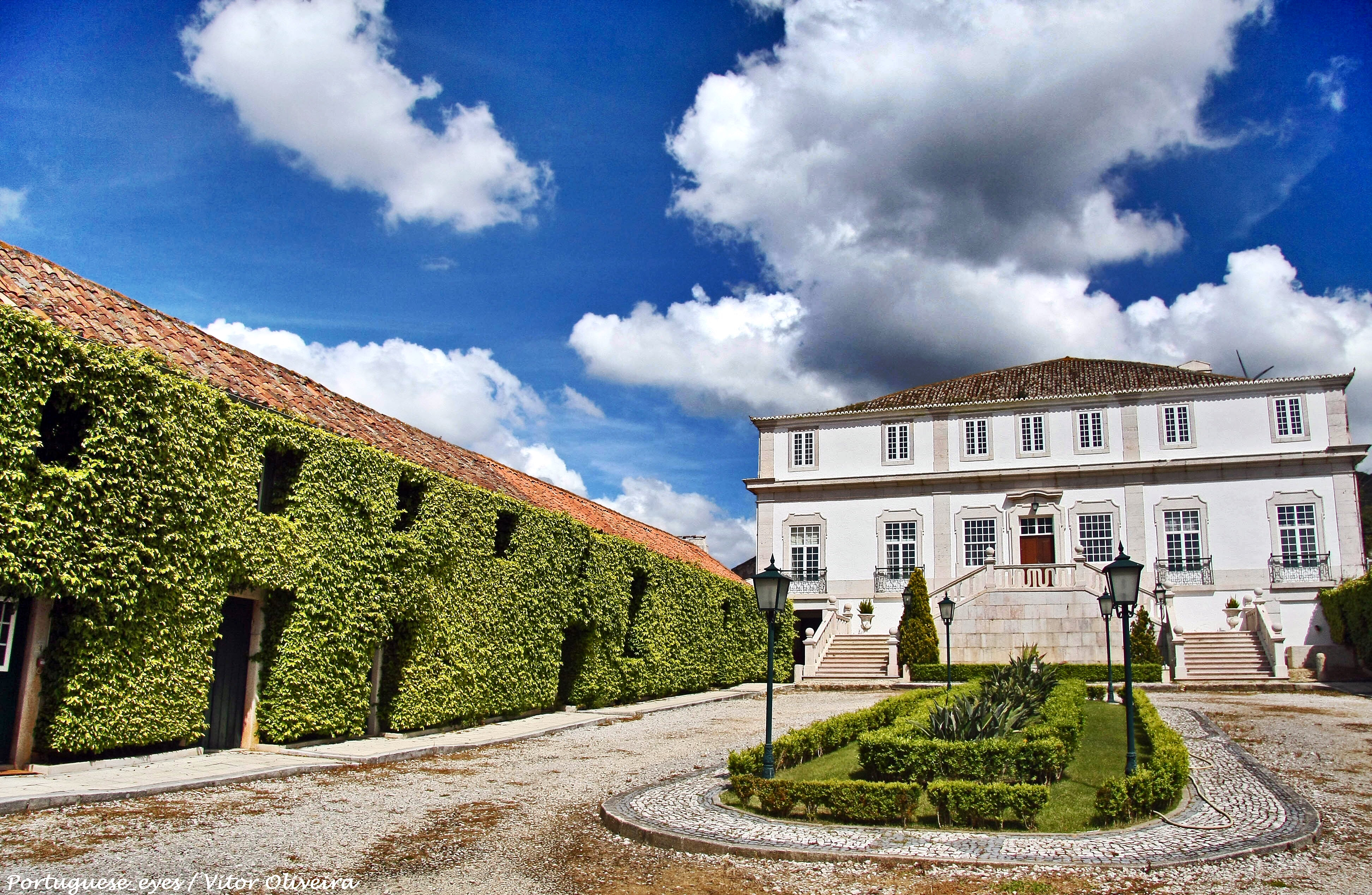
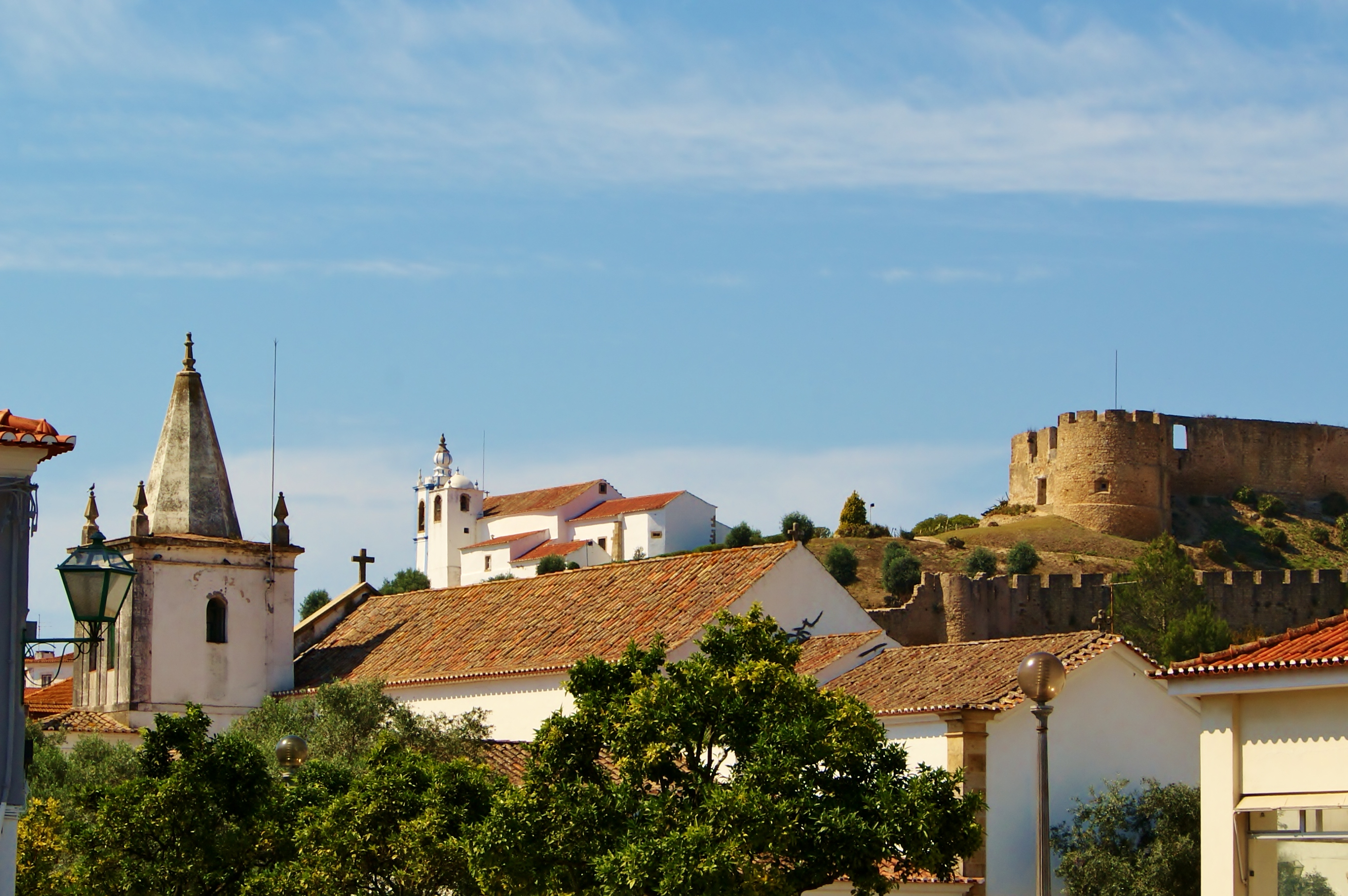
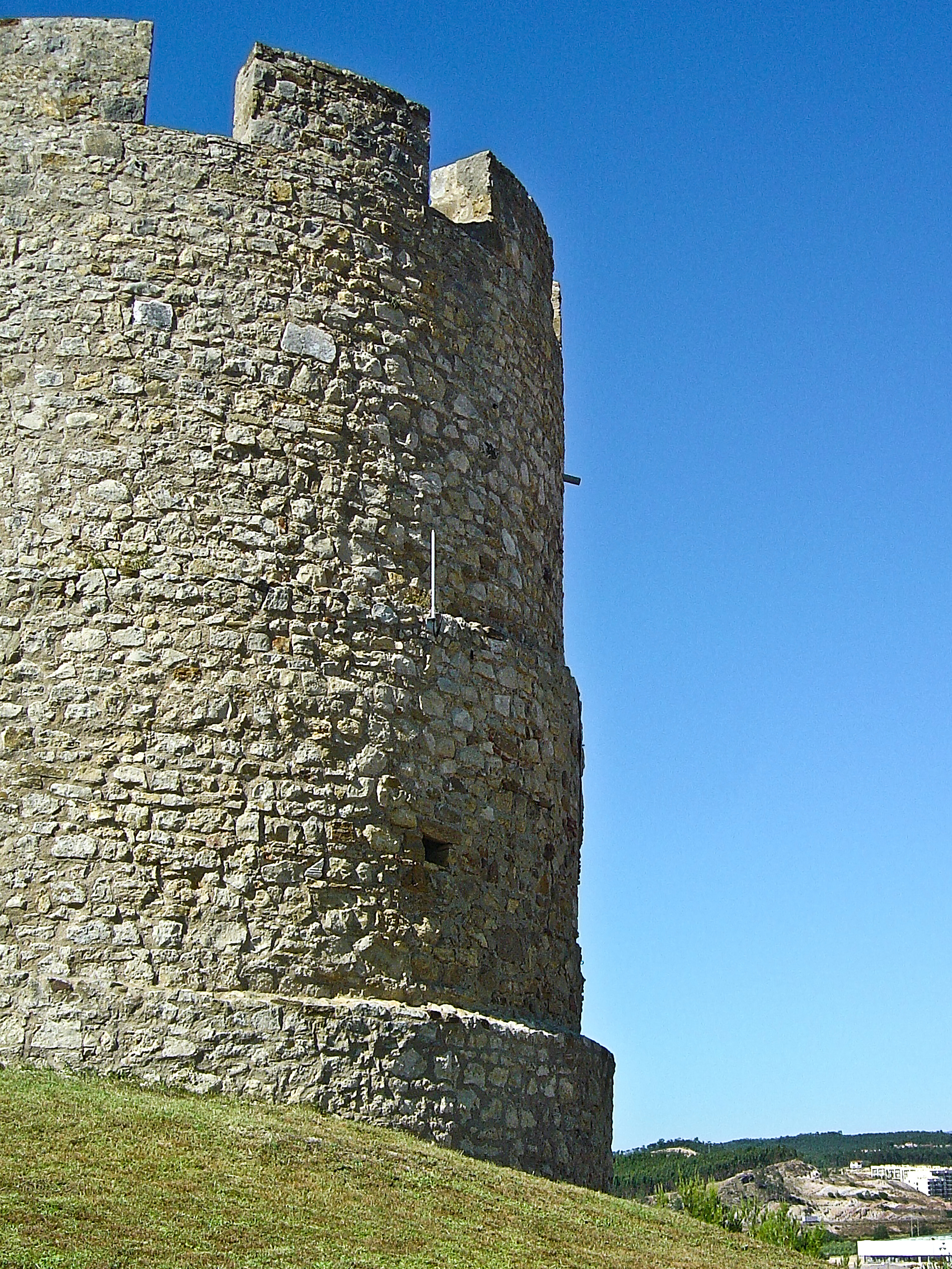
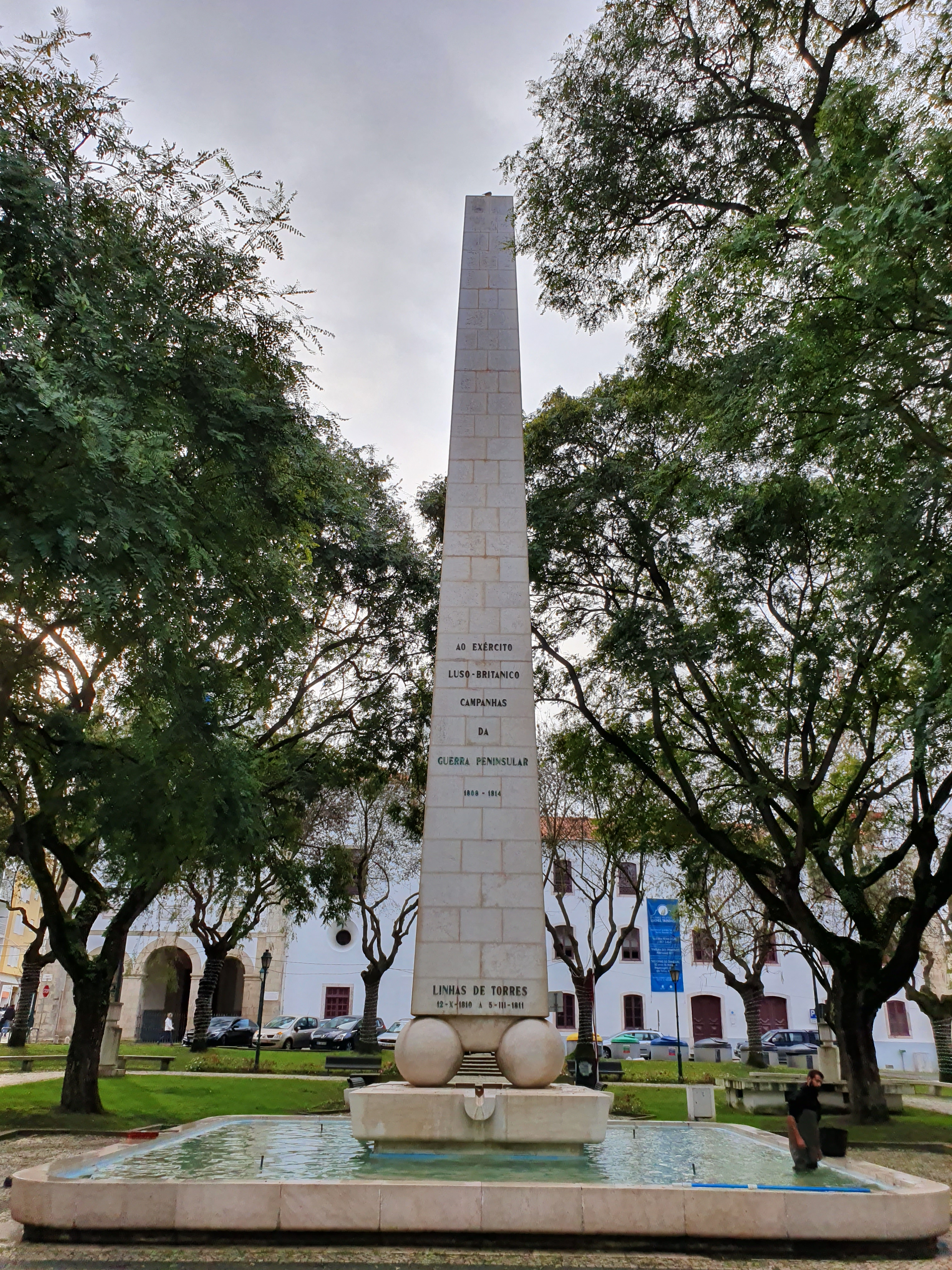
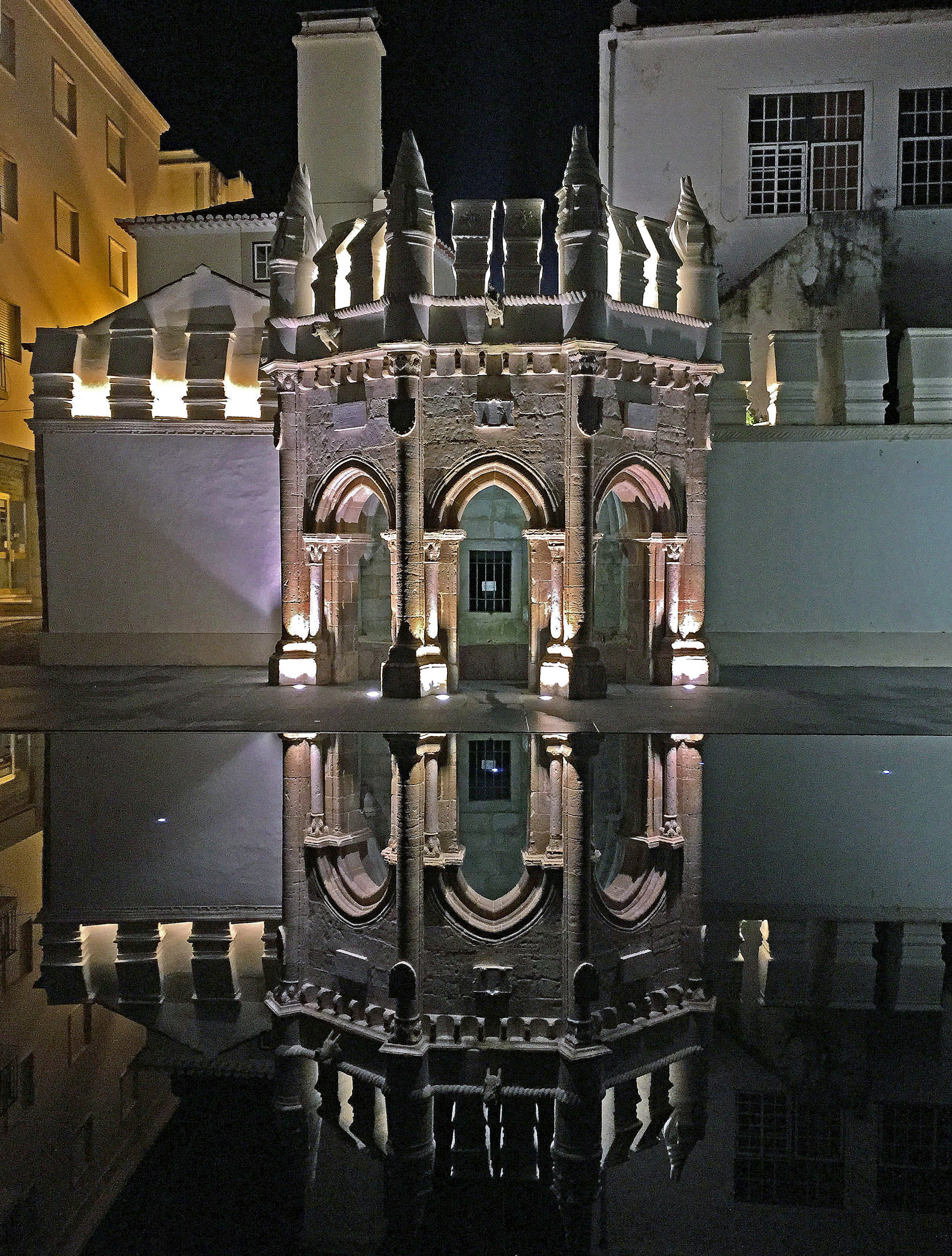
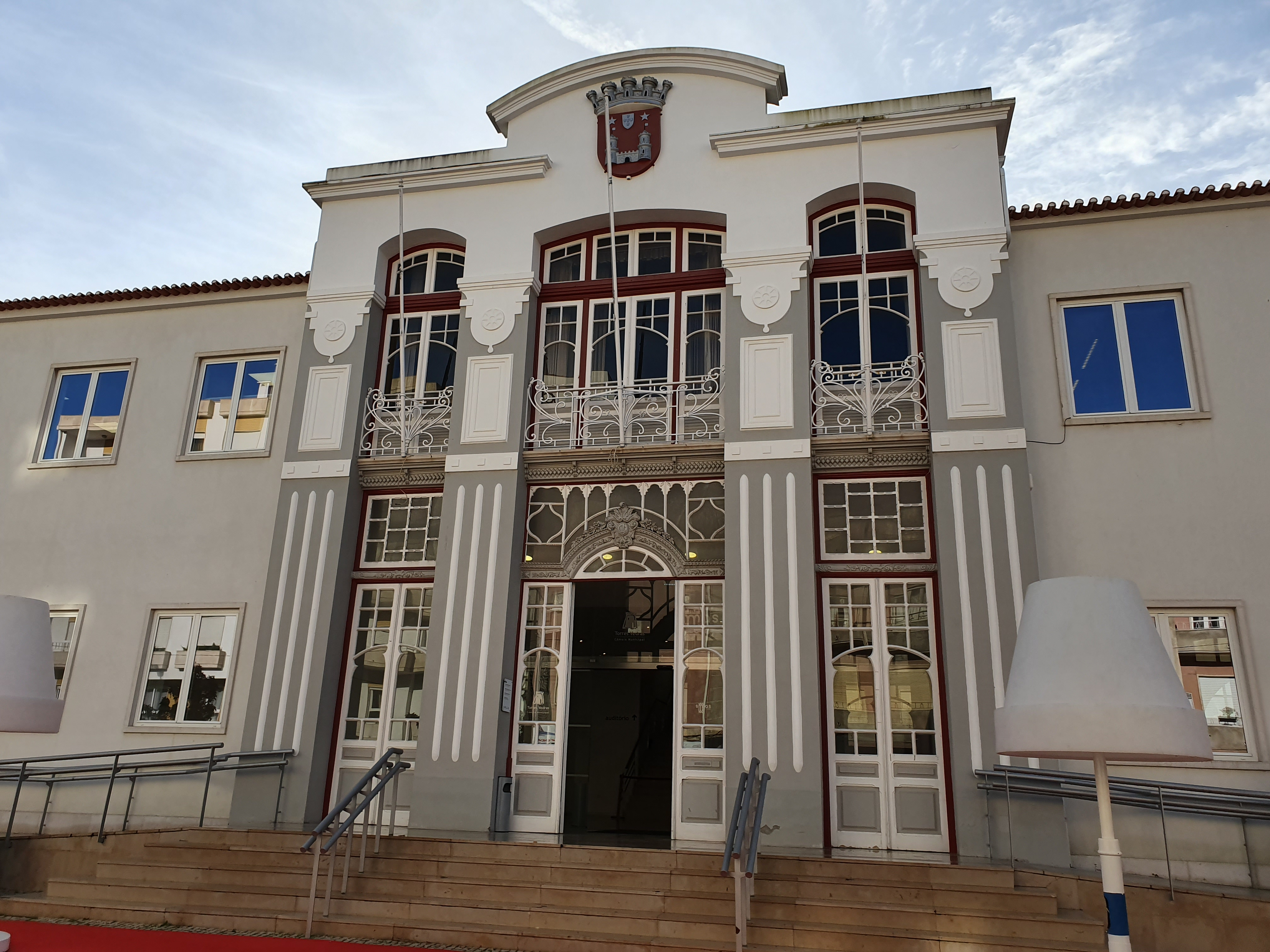
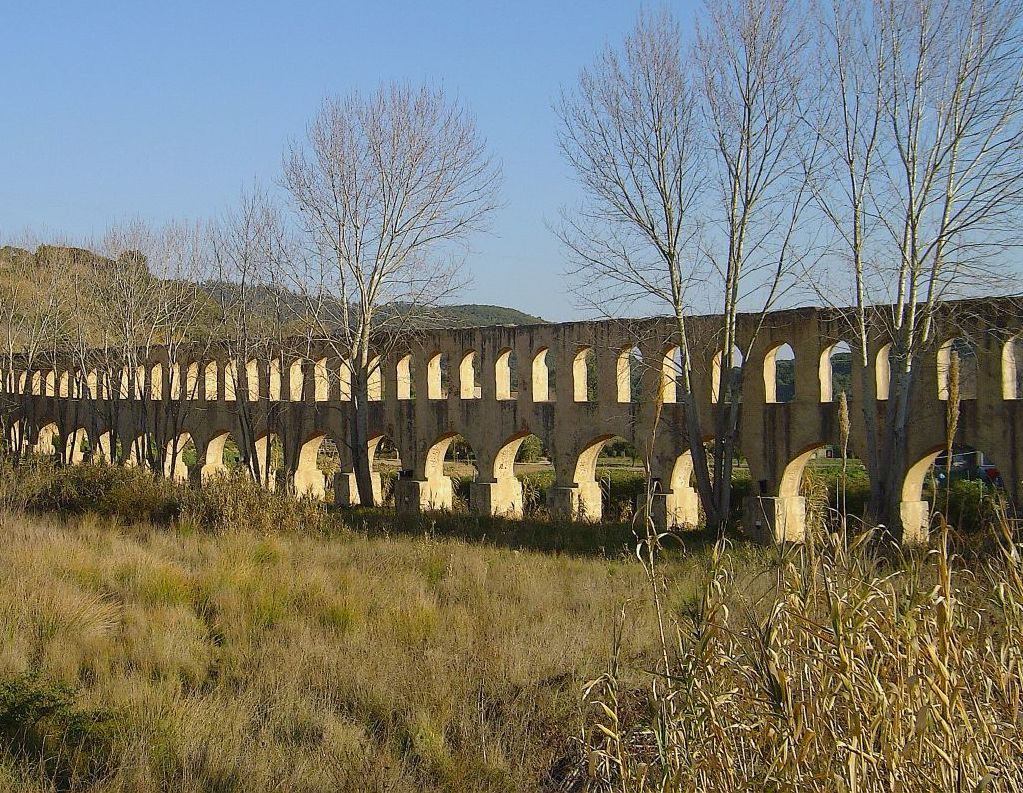
- Clockwise from top-right: View of the castle hill from the city centre, Chafariz dos Canos, Aqueduct, City Hall, Peninsular War monument at Graça, Castle of Torres Vedras, and Quinta das Lapas (Monte Redondo)

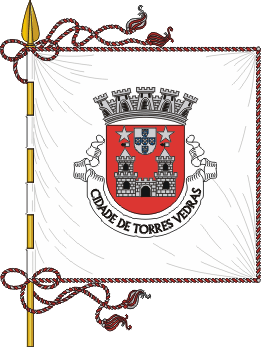
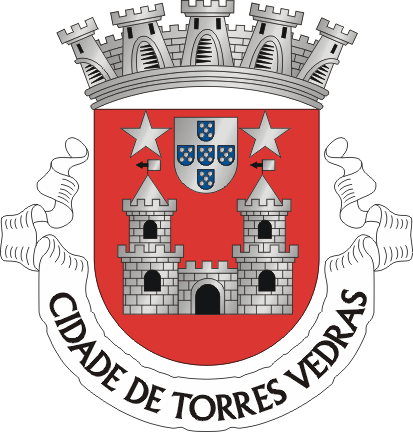
- Flag Coat of arms
- Interactive map of Torres Vedras
- Coordinates: 39°5′N 9°16′W
- Country: Portugal
- Planning region: Lisbon and Tagus Valley
- Region: Oeste e Vale do Tejo
- Intermunicipal community: Oeste
- District: Lisbon
- Historical province: Estremadura
- Settlement: Antiquity
- Conquest: 1148
- First Charter: 15 August 1250
- New Charter: 1 June 1510
- Current territory: 1855
- Elevation to City: 3 February 1979
- Civil parishes: 15

Government
  - Type: Municipality
  - Body: Câmara Municipal of Torres Vedras
  - Mayor: Sérgio Galvão (Unidos por Torres Vedras (Ind.- PSD-CDS–PP-Volt)
  - President of the Assembly: Helena Ferreira

Area
  - Total: 407.15 km^{2} (157.20 sq mi)
  - City-proper (INE): 29.01 km^{2} (11.20 sq mi)

Population (2021)
  - Total: 83,075
  - Density: 204.04/km^{2} (528.46/sq mi)
  - City-proper (INE): 19,528
  - City-proper (INE) density: 673.1/km^{2} (1,743/sq mi)
- Demonym(s): torriense, torriano
- Time zone: UTC+00:00 (WET)
  - Summer (DST): UTC+01:00 (WEST)
- Postal code: 2560
- Area code: 261
- Patron Saint: Saint Gundisalvus of Lagos
- Municipal Holiday: 11 November (Magusto)
- Website: https://www.cm-tvedras.pt/

Torres Vedras (European Portuguese: [ˈtoʁɨʒ ˈvɛðɾɐʃ]) is a medium-sized municipality and city in the West area of the Oeste e Vale do Tejo region of Portugal, and in historical Estremadura province, located approximately 50 kilometres (31 mi) north of the national and district capital, Lisbon. Historically a part of Estremadura, it is the most populous municipality of the Oeste intermunicipal community, with 83 072 residents at the time of the 2021 Census, in an area of 407.15 square kilometres (157.20 sq mi).

Often locally shortened to just Torres, it is a settlement with over a thousand years of history, it is most known as the namesake of the Lines of Torres Vedras during the Peninsular War, as well as its Atlantic coastline popular in the Summer and its yearly Carnival, self-titled "the Most Portuguese in Portugal". Its territory is also home to a strong agricultural presence primarily linked to its vineyards and fruit production. It was, alongside neighbouring Alenquer, the European City of Wine in 2018.

== History ==
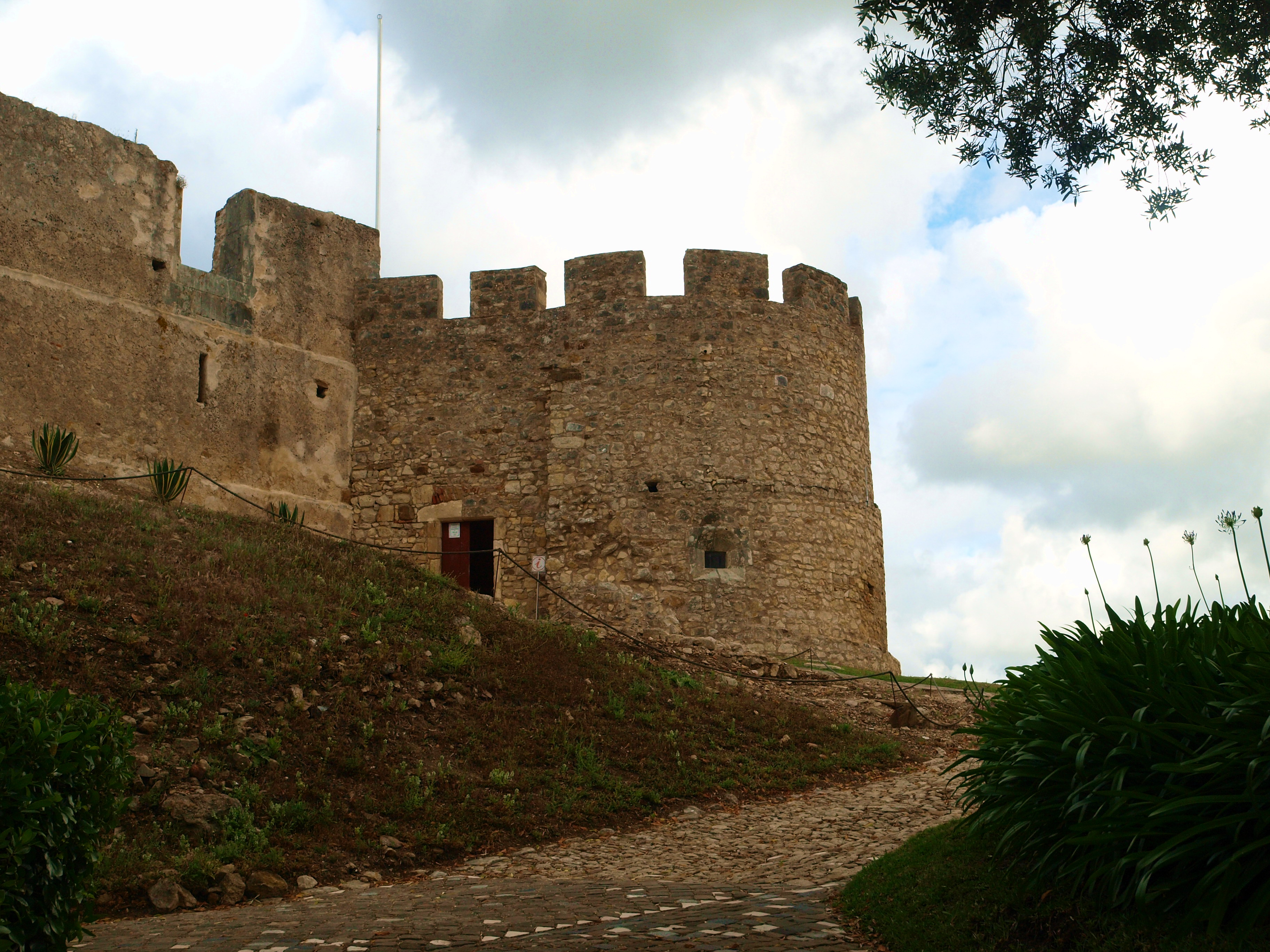
The keep tower of the Moorish Castle of Torres Vedras, used in battle in the nation's infancy

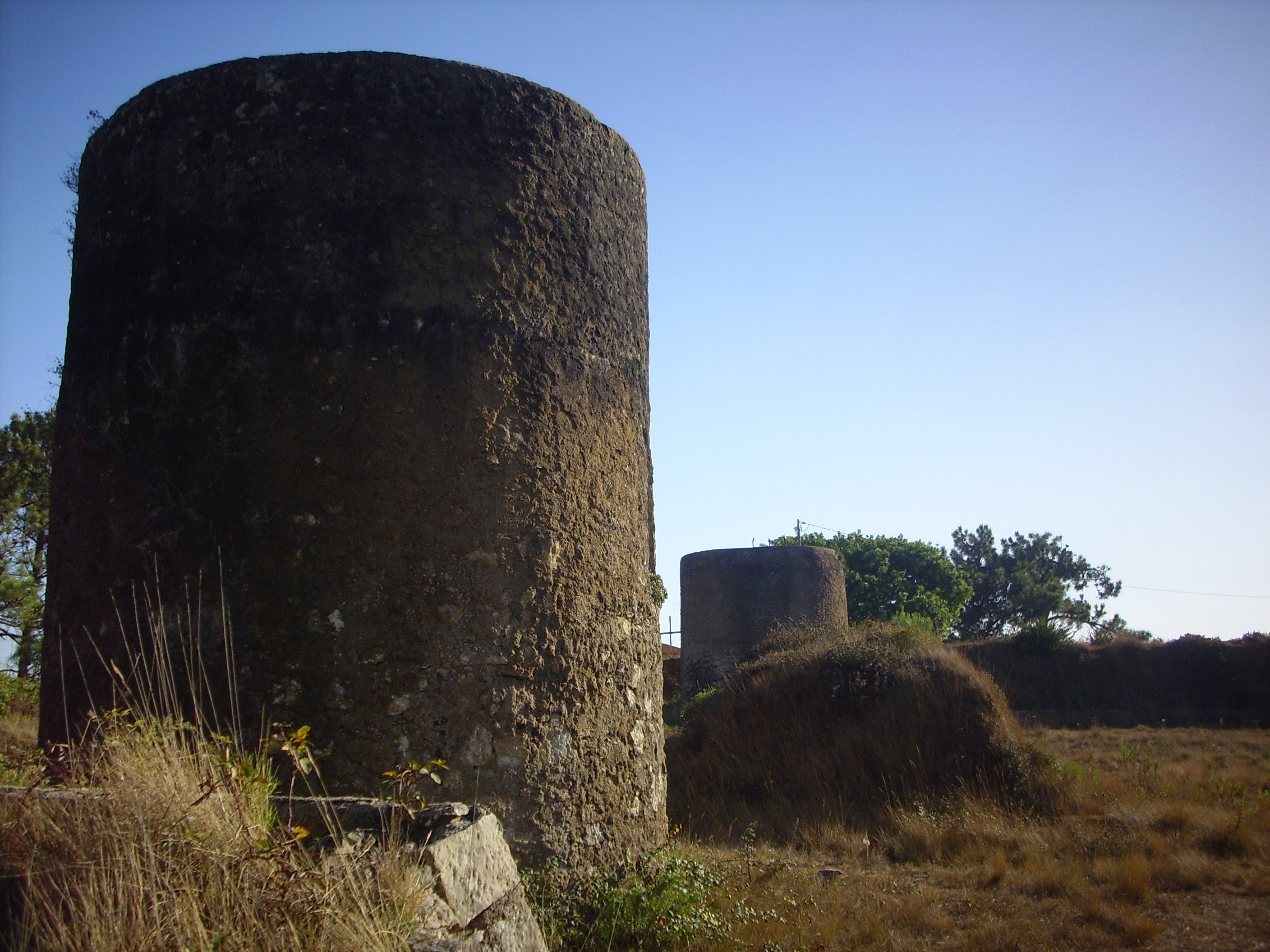
Part of the defensive Lines of Torres Vedras initiated by Lt. Gen. Arthur Wellesley in the Peninsular Wars

In 1148, Afonso I took the town of Torres Vedras from the Moors, in the then region of Estremadura, an area encircled by gentle hills and valleys. King Afonso III conceded a foral (charter) in 1250, which was later confirmed by King Manuel I in 1510. This latter decree conferred on the town many of the municipal privileges that it held for 729 years.

While travelling through this district, King Afonso III and Queen Beatrice, ordered the construction of a municipal hall, alongside the ancient castle (which today no longer exists). For his part, King Denis, his successor, was captivated by local Gracia Frois, fathering an illegitimate son, who would go on to be Count of Barcelos.

Later, the municipality was donated to the Queens of the realm, and in particular, under the Aviz dynasty, the Infanta Eleonor (daughter of King Edward and Queen Eleanor), who would later marry Frederick III of Germany, was born in Torres Vedras (18 September 1434).

Torres Vedras continued to be a place of importance: in 1413, King John I met with his council after legitimizing his expedition to Ceuta (marking the beginning of Portuguese maritime expansion); the Regent Peter, convened the Cortes in 1411, to deliberate over the wedding of his daughter Isabel with his nephew Afonso; and the place where King John II received the ambassadors of the Kingdom of Naples, and later the Republic of Venice, in 1496.

At the same time, intrigues and confrontations were fermented in Torres Vedras by local alcaides, such as in 1384 when the Master of Aviz encircled the town in order to force the Castilian alcalde Juan Duque to surrender. It was for the same reason, that King John IV was forced to take city in 1640, when the Portuguese alcaide João Soares de Alarcão, aligned himself with the Philippine monarchs.

In comparison, the loyalty and sympathies of the Portuguese of the region were tested with the French invasions of the Peninsular Wars (1808–1810). Anticipating the final defeat of the French, General Delaborde's forces were defeated on 21 August 1808, at the battles of Roliça and Vimeiro, by the Anglo-Portuguese Army that had landed at Porto Novo. Junot, who had installed himself in the town, signed a truce and left the town, retreating towards Lisbon, but not before sacking the churches and convents along the way.

Arthur Wellesley, later the Duke of Wellington and Marquess of Torres Vedras, began the construction (1809–1810) of the Lines of Torres Vedras that would extend to the sea. This fortified system, which included 152 forts and 628 redoubts, was marked by the Fort of São Vicente, in Torres Vedras. Ironically, the fort only saw battle after the French were removed from Portugal, when Cabralist forces (those supporting politician Costa Cabral) under the Duke of Saldanha, evicted Setembrist forces of the Count of Bonfim.

Over 10,000 troops were involved in the bloody Battle of Torres Vedras, which resulted in the surrender of the Count's forces on 23 December 1846. The deaths of 400 men and 500 wounded, that included Lieutenant-Colonel Luís Mouzinho de Albuquerque, a liberal officer who disembarked in Mindelo and was later buried in the Church of São Pedro.

Following much of its history in battle, Torres Vedras lapsed into years of progress and development, supported by the expansion of the rail-lines in 1886, the installation of the electrical grid in 1912, and finally the canalization of waters to the town by 1926. These changes helped support a growth, construction of new barrios and roadways, resulting in the town's reclassification as a city in 1979.

On 28 January 2026, Storm Kristin caused a catastrophic impact with €37 million in damage in the municipality of Torres Vedras and 150 homes have suffered severe damage in the municipality.

== Geography ==
Population of Torres Vedras (1801–2011)
Year	Pop.	±%
1801	17,244	—
1849	15,021	−12.9%
1900	35,726	+137.8%
1930	47,917	+34.1%
1960	58,837	+22.8%
1981	65,039	+10.5%
1991	67,185	+3.3%
2001	72,250	+7.5%
2011	79,465	+10.0%

Fronting the Atlantic Ocean, Torres Vedras is bordered by the municipalities of Lourinhã (to the north), Alenquer (to the east), Sobral de Monte Agraço (to the southeast) and Mafra (to the south). A dispersed population, Torres Vedras includes 21 urban agglomerations, of which most have less than 200 inhabitants. Altogether the municipality has a population of 79,465.

The municipality covers an area of 407.15 square kilometres (157.20 mi^{2}). Administratively, the municipality is divided into 15 civil parishes (freguesias):

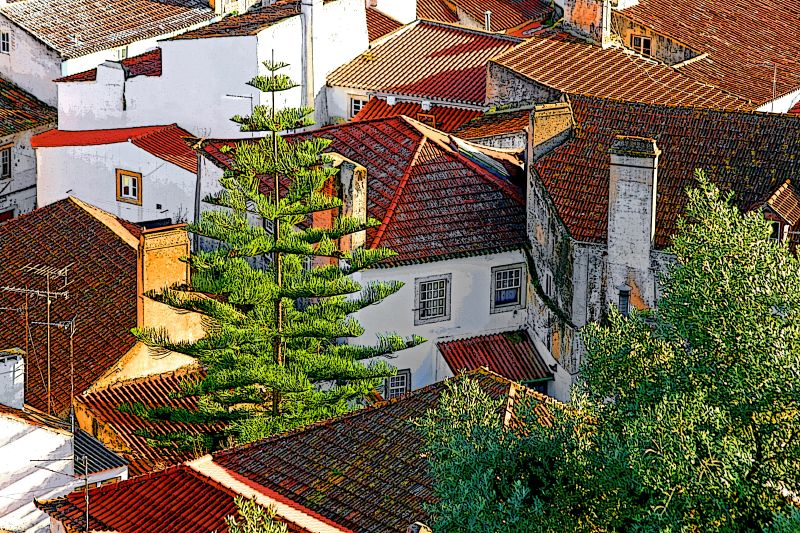
The red tiled-roofs of the town in Santa Maria do Castelo e São Miguel parish

- A dos Cunhados
- Campelos e Outeiro da Cabeça
- Carvoeira e Carmões
- Dois Portos
- Freiria
- Maceira
- Maxial e Monte Redondo
- Ponte do Rol
- Ramalhal
- Runa
- São Pedro da Cadeira
- Torres Vedras (São Pedro e Santiago e Santa Maria do Castelo e São Miguel) e Matacães
- Silveira
- Turcifal
- Ventosa

The resident population of the city of Torres Vedras (approximately 20,000 inhabitants in two largest urban parishes) represents about 25% of the population of the municipality.

=== Climate ===
Torres Vedras has a warm-summer Mediterranean climate with mild, wet winters and warm, dry summers.

Climate data for Dois Portos, Torres Vedras, 1991-2020 normals, 1931-1960 sunshine, 1961-1990 humidity, altitude: 110 m (360 ft)
Month	Jan	Feb	Mar	Apr	May	Jun	Jul	Aug	Sep	Oct	Nov	Dec	Year
Record high °C (°F)	25.8 (78.4)	24.1 (75.4)	31.3 (88.3)	32.0 (89.6)	35.2 (95.4)	41.6 (106.9)	41.7 (107.1)	44.8 (112.6)	40.1 (104.2)	35.5 (95.9)	27.0 (80.6)	26.2 (79.2)	44.8 (112.6)
Mean daily maximum °C (°F)	14.3 (57.7)	15.4 (59.7)	18.0 (64.4)	19.3 (66.7)	22.0 (71.6)	24.9 (76.8)	26.8 (80.2)	27.8 (82.0)	26.3 (79.3)	22.5 (72.5)	17.5 (63.5)	14.8 (58.6)	20.8 (69.4)
Daily mean °C (°F)	9.8 (49.6)	10.7 (51.3)	13.0 (55.4)	14.4 (57.9)	16.7 (62.1)	19.4 (66.9)	21.3 (70.3)	21.9 (71.4)	20.3 (68.5)	17.3 (63.1)	13.1 (55.6)	10.5 (50.9)	15.7 (60.3)
Mean daily minimum °C (°F)	5.4 (41.7)	6.0 (42.8)	7.9 (46.2)	9.4 (48.9)	11.4 (52.5)	14.0 (57.2)	15.7 (60.3)	16.0 (60.8)	14.4 (57.9)	12.2 (54.0)	8.6 (47.5)	6.3 (43.3)	10.6 (51.1)
Record low °C (°F)	−5.7 (21.7)	−6.0 (21.2)	−3.2 (26.2)	−0.8 (30.6)	2.7 (36.9)	5.4 (41.7)	4.2 (39.6)	5.2 (41.4)	3.4 (38.1)	0.0 (32.0)	−4.5 (23.9)	−5.5 (22.1)	−6.0 (21.2)
Average precipitation mm (inches)	81.3 (3.20)	62.0 (2.44)	60.9 (2.40)	63.3 (2.49)	48.0 (1.89)	16.0 (0.63)	3.8 (0.15)	5.6 (0.22)	31.2 (1.23)	90.8 (3.57)	98.0 (3.86)	86.8 (3.42)	647.9 (25.51)
Average precipitation days (≥ 1 mm)	10.8	8.6	8.7	9.1	7.0	3.0	0.8	1.4	4.5	9.8	10.9	10.4	84.9
Average relative humidity (%)	84	82	76	77	75	75	73	74	75	78	81	83	78
Mean monthly sunshine hours	137.2	154.2	176.0	223.2	246.0	264.2	308.9	295.7	234.5	191.4	140.0	115.1	2,486.4
Source: Instituto de Meteorologia (1931-1960, 1991-2020 extremes)

== Economy and tourism ==
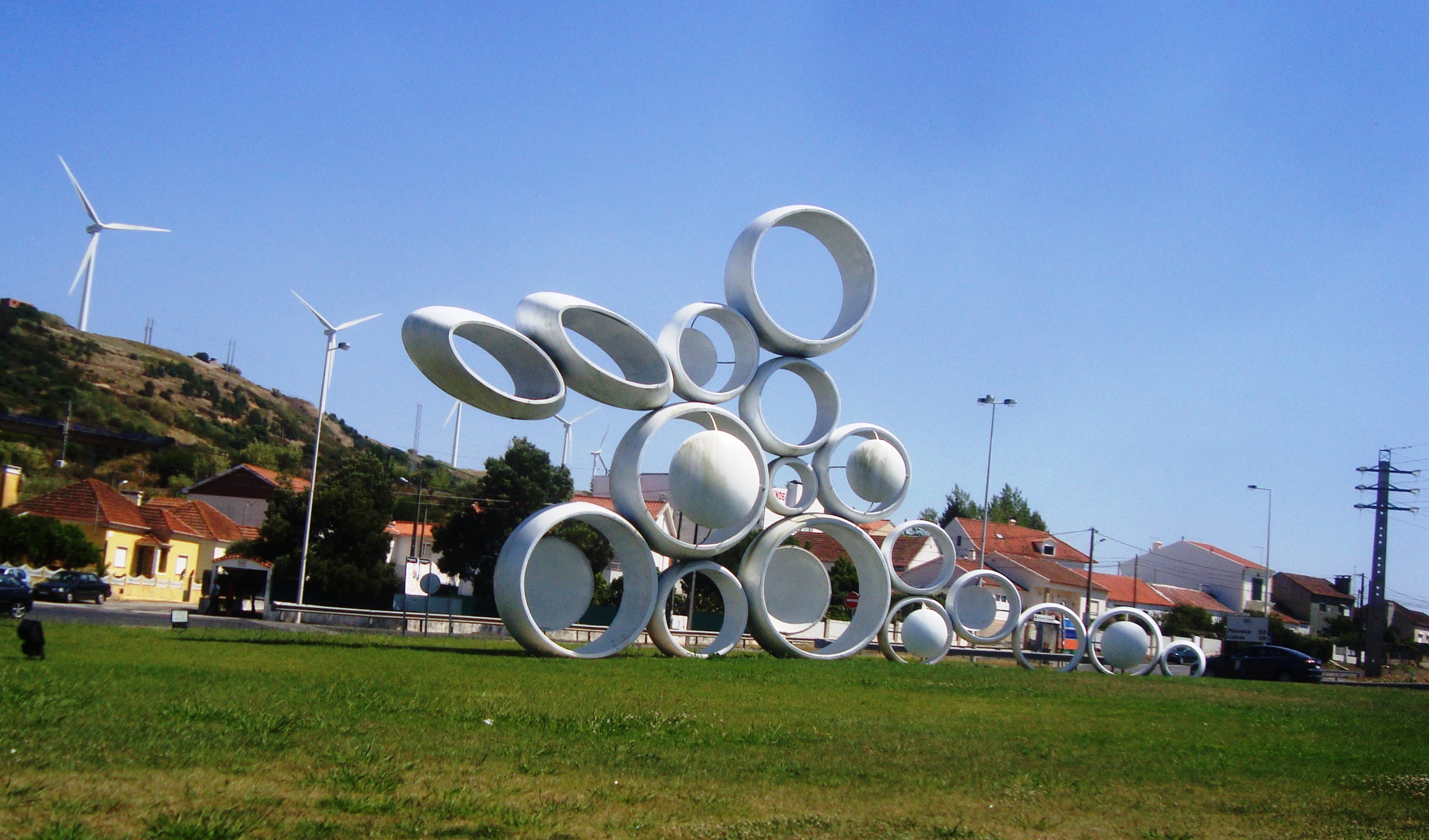
Sculpture Uvas, a symbol of viniculture (one of the main economic activities of the region), located in the southern access to the city

In 2011, Torres Vedras received the QualityCoast Gold Award for its efforts to become a sustainable tourist destination, and was selected for inclusion in the global atlas for sustainable tourism DestiNet.

The Leonel Trindade Municipal Museum is an archaeological and historical museum in the town, located in a former convent (Convento da Graça) on the southern edge of the city centre. In addition to an extensive archaeological section dating back to late- Palaeolithic times, the museum contains works of art from local churches as well as an exhibition relating to the Lines of Torres Vedras. Much of the archaeological collection comes from the Chalcolithic, fortified settlement known as the Castro of Zambujal (3rd millennium BC) and from the Tholos do Barro, a Chalcolithic tomb, both of which are in the municipality.

== Sport ==
The local professional football team is S.C.U. Torreense, which plays at the Manuel Marques Stadium. Besides football, Torreense also has athletics.

The city is home to another sports club, Sporting Club Torreense, where the following sports are practiced: roller hockey, futsal, table tennis, volleyball, and gymnastics.

== Notable people ==
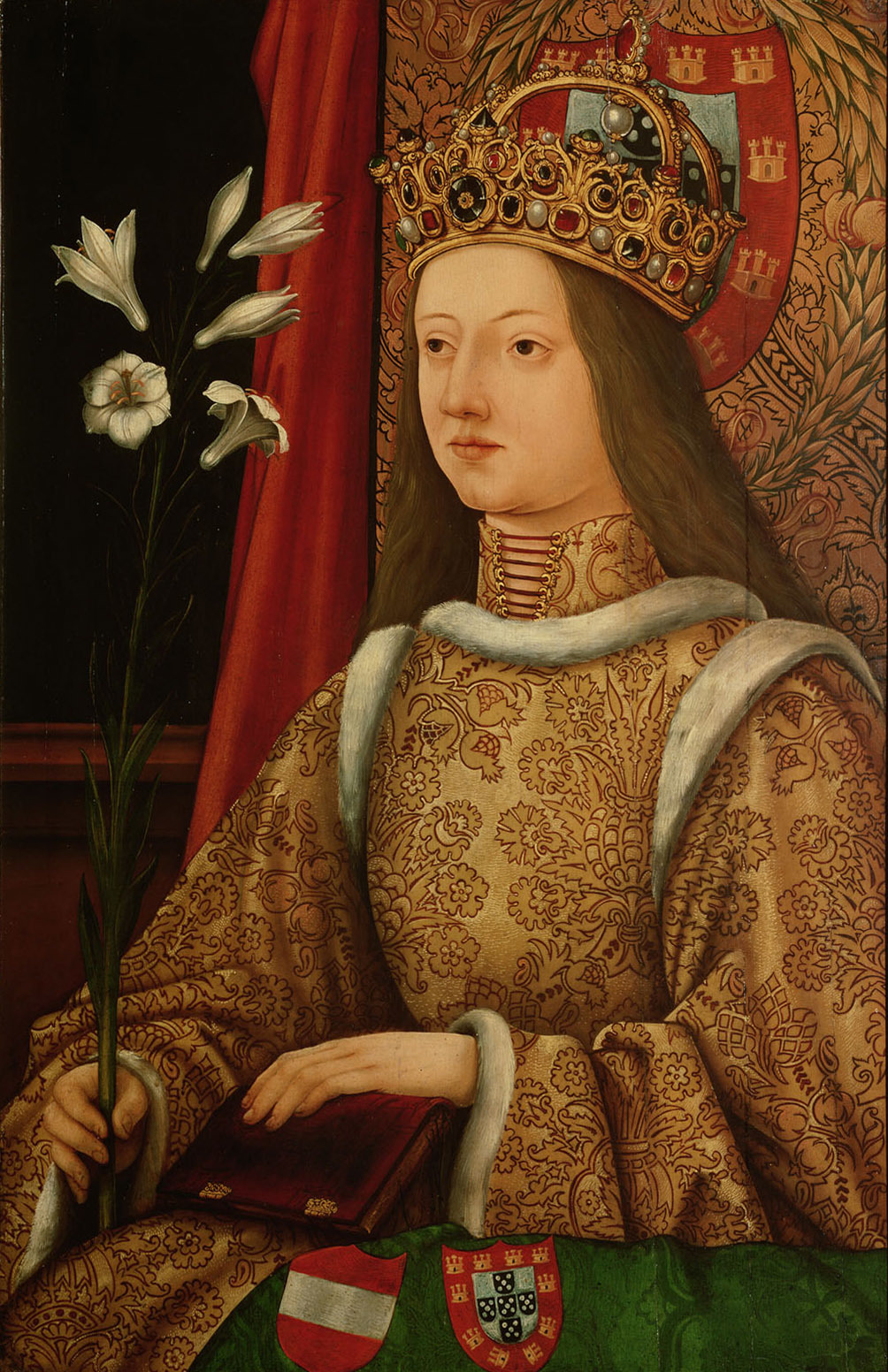
Eleanor of Portugal

- Eleanor of Portugal, Holy Roman Empress (1434–1467) an infanta (princess), daughter of King Edward of Portugal & Empress of the Holy Roman Empire
- Lopo Soares de Albergaria (c.1460 – c.1520) the third Governor of Portuguese India
- Cristóvão Ferreira (c.1580–1650) a priest and Jesuit missionary who committed apostasy in Japan
- Luís da Silva Mouzinho de Albuquerque (1792–1846) a military officer, poet, scientist and politician
- Manuel Clemente (born 1948) a prelate of the Catholic Church; the Patriarch of Lisbon since 2013
- Carlos Miguel (born 1957) a lawyer, politician and Govt. minister of Romani ethnicity
- Guta Moura Guedes (born 1965) curator, author, journalist and television presenter.
- Beto (1967–2010) a Portuguese singer; lived in Torres Vedras from aged 17
- Susana Félix (born 1975) a singer, songwriter, musician, actress and producer.
- Bernardo Blanco (born 1995), politician and Member of Parliament.
- Lisandro Cuxi (born 1999 in Zambujal) a Portuguese–Cape-Verdean singer-songwriter and dancer.

=== Sport ===
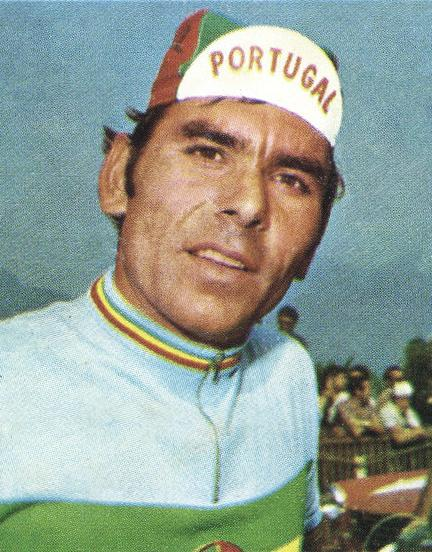
Joaquim Agostinho, 1972

- José Pereira (born 1931) a football goalkeeper with 302 caps with Belenenses and 11 for Portugal
- Joaquim Agostinho (1942 – 1984) professional bicycle racer
- Vítor Campos (1944-2019) a footballer with 275 caps with Académica
- Hélder Baptista (born 1972) a retired footballer with 311 club caps
- Nelson Pereira (born 1975) football goalkeeper with 201 club caps and 3 for Portugal
- Zé António (born 1977) a Portuguese former footballer with 451 club caps
- Anselmo Cardoso (born 1984 in Freiria) a former footballer with 267 club caps
- André Santos (born 1989) football player with 300 club caps
- Henrique Chaves (born 1997) a Portuguese racing driver.
- Fábio Carvalho (born 2002) footballer who plays for Brentford.

== See also ==
- Torres Vedras IPR
- Leonel Trindade Municipal Museum, Torres Vedras
- List of forts of the Lines of Torres Vedras
