= São Bartolomeu dos Galegos =

Former civil parish in Portugal

Coordinates: 39.2758°N 9.2794°W

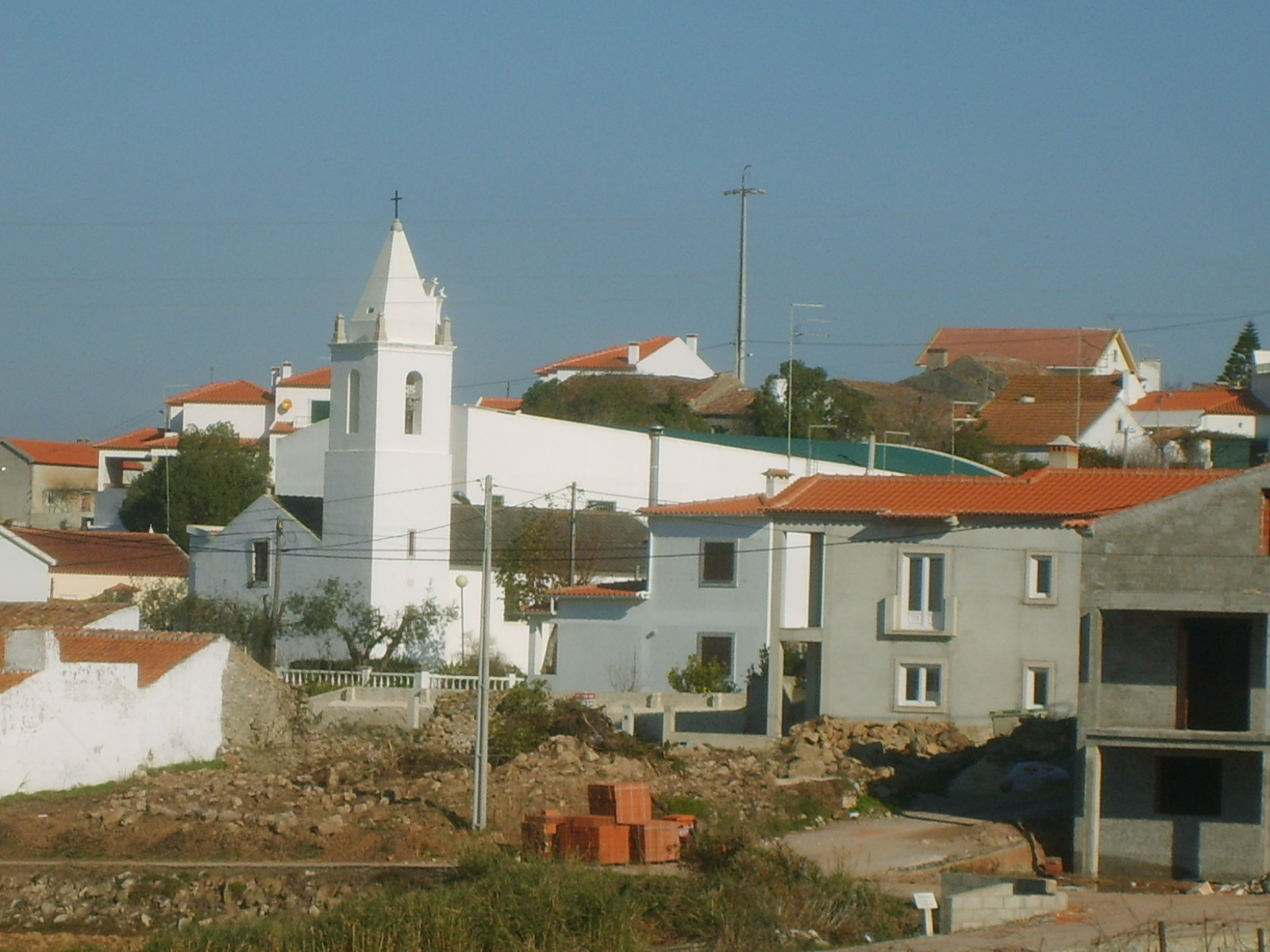
Church of Saint Bartholomew of the Galicians

São Bartolomeu dos Galegos is a former civil parish in the municipality of Lourinhã, Lisbon District, Portugal. In 2013, the parish merged into the new parish São Bartolomeu dos Galegos e Moledo. Located around 80 kilometres (50 mi) from Lisbon. The parish contains a miradouro (viewpoint), which gives a view over the Lourinhã parish.

Evidence of settlements in the parish has been found from as early as the Neolithic period in the form of caves and artefacts. However, it was not until the Middle Ages when a "housing project" was formed: St. Bartholomew. In 2001, São Bartolomeu dos Galegos had a population of 1,041 people, a decrease from 1,062 in 1991 and from 1963, where there were 1,570 inhabitants of the parish.

São Bartolomeu dos Galegos is known for the three Grottes de São Bartolomeu (Caves of São Bartolomeu dos Galegos), all of which were previously used as necropoleis.

After the splitting of Óbidos in the fourteenth century, São Bartolomeu dos Galegos officially became a parish. In 1525, the parish Reguengo Grande left São Bartolomeu, which was followed by the Parish of Moledo doing the same in 1594. Until 1836, the parish was part of the Óbidos Municipality, but then was re-allocated to the Lourinhã Municipality. Until the Proclamation of the First Portuguese Republic, the parish was known as São Lourenço dos Galegos, but it was then announced to have been renamed to São Bartolomeu dos Galegos because of the proclamation. In the parish, the main industry is the extraction of processing of stone and marble.

On 2 November 2012, the Portuguese government (through the Technical Unit for Administrative Reorganization Planning) suggested reducing the number of parishes in Portugal. This resulted in the union between São Bartolomeu dos Galegos and Moledo to form the União das Freguesias São Bartolomeu dos Galegos e Moledo.
