= Moledo =

Village and former civil parish in Portugal

- Civil parish
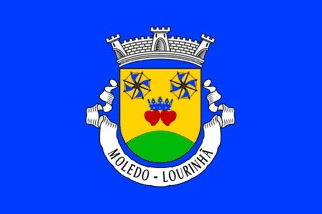
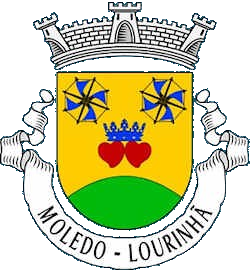
- Flag Coat of arms

- Location in Portugal
- Coordinates: 39°17′05″N 9°15′25″W
- Country: Portugal
- Region: Oeste e Vale do Tejo
- Intermunic. comm.: Oeste
- District: Lisbon
- Municipality: Lourinhã
- Disbanded: 2013

Population (2011)
  - Total: 472
- Time zone: UTC+00:00 (WET)
  - Summer (DST): UTC+01:00 (WEST)

Moledo is a village and a former civil parish in the municipality of Lourinhã, Lisbon District, Portugal. In 2013, the parish merged into the new parish São Bartolomeu dos Galegos e Moledo.

It has retained its agricultural character, with agriculture remaining the main activity along with civil construction. Moledo was the only village in the civil parish. Moledo has a church as well as several windmills.

== Geography ==
=== Location ===
Location of Moledo.

The civil parish of Moledo is in the Central region, northwest of the country's capital, at the northwest end of its district. It is situated 84 kilometers north of Lisbon, 77.9 kilometers southwest of Leiria, and 9.9 kilometers northeast of Lourinhã.

It is bordered by the Leiria District, with the parish of Olho Marinho belonging to the municipality of Óbidos. Moledo was bordered by the civil parishes of São Bartolomeu dos Galegos and Reguengo Grande.

=== Communication and transport ===
The civil parish is crossed by National Road 247–1, which connects the Portuguese expressway IP6 to Peniche and the A8 Motorway to Bombarral. A secondary road connects the center of the civil parish of Miragaia to Olho Marinho, via Cezaredas.

== Urbanism ==
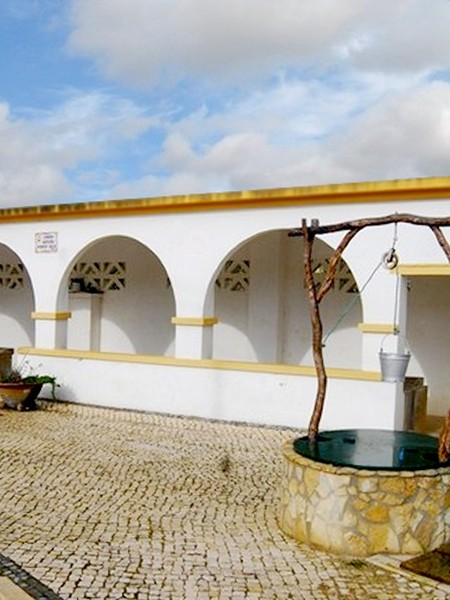
Lavoirs de Moledo (Washhouses of Moledo).

The civil parish of Moledo has retained its rural character. It is the least developed and populated locality in the municipality of Lourinhã. Several houses are in ruins, and there are few new real estate constructions. In 2001, the parish had 289 residences.

== Toponymy ==
The toponym Moledo comes from the topography of the terrain. The word means large stone, irregular stone, which corresponds to the characteristics of the local rock.

== History ==
The first populations settled in the Neolithic period. According to historians, it is in a palace in Moledo that Inês de Castro is said to have lived. She is said to have met Peter I there several times. The palace was abandoned as early as the 16th century, leading to its disappearance in the 19th century.

On 12 October 1378, the king of that time, Ferdinand I, issued a letter of privileges, which is one of the first documents related to the history of Moledo. In 1594, the civil parish of Moledo left that of São Bartolomeu dos Galegos to become an independent civil parish. It administratively belonged to the municipality of Óbidos and changed to that of Lourinhã after the administrative reform of 6 November 1836.

== Politics and administration ==
Comprising only a single locality, the parish has Moledo as its chief town and is represented by the parish president, Alexandre Manuel de Jesus Maurício (PS). It is attached to the municipality of Lourinhã, represented by the president José Manuel Custódio (PS).

In the local elections of 2005, there were 296 voters out of 406 registered, a participation rate of 72.91%. In 2009, there were 295 voters out of 394 registered, a participation rate of 74.87%.

On 2 November 2012, the Portuguese state, through the Unit for the Technical Reorganization of the Territorial Administration, expressed the wish to reduce the number of civil parishes. For Moledo, the project is to merge with the civil parish of São Bartolomeu dos Galegos within the União das Freguesias de São Bartolomeu dos Galegos e Moledo.

== Population and society ==
The civil parish has a kindergarten and a nursery school. It also has a cemetery which is located on the territory of São Bartolomeu dos Galegos.

=== Demographics ===
The area of Moledo is 7.40 km2 with 472 inhabitants (2011), resulting in a population density of 64 inhabitants/km2. Moledo is the third least populated civil parish in the Lisbon District.

Population evolution
2001	2011
476	472

In the 1960s, emigration abroad led to a decline in the population of the civil parish. Moledo had a population of 476 inhabitants in 2001, compared to 472 inhabitants in 2011.

=== Cultural events and festivities ===
The civil parish of Moledo has an association dedicated to culture, leisure, and sports founded on 18 February 1983.

It also has another association, the parish fabric association founded on 25 November 1940. The president is the priest, and it organizes several cultural and festive events, such as the feast in honor of Santo Antão on 17 January, São Sebastião on 20 January, Divino Espírito Santo on 4 June, as well as the annual fair on 6 June.

== Economy ==
The population is mainly specialized in agricultural exploitation and civil construction.

== Culture and heritage ==
=== Religious heritage ===
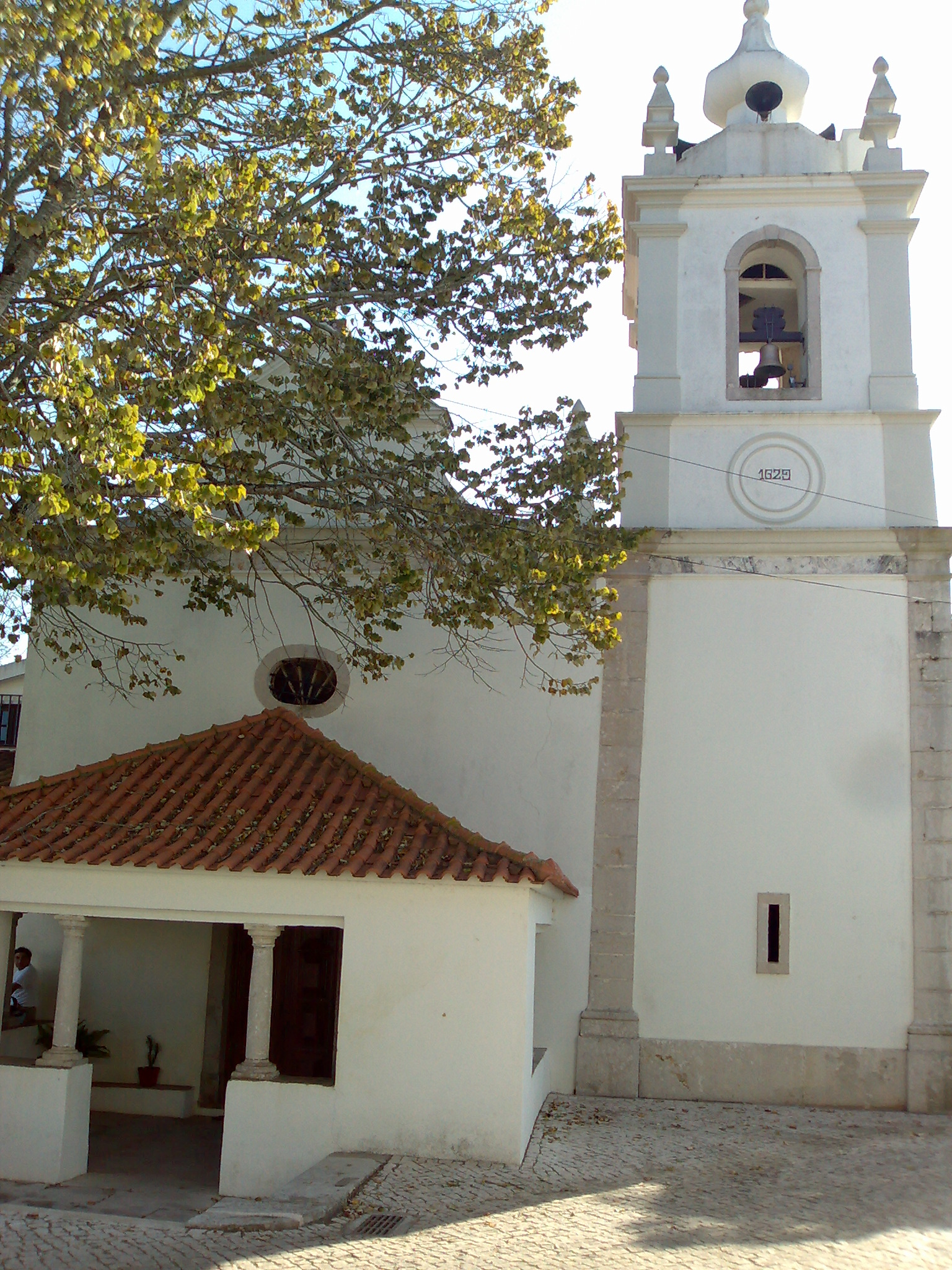
Divino Espírito Santo church.

The civil parish has a Catholic place of worship, the Church of the Divino Espírito Santo located on Santa Cruz Square in the center of Moledo. Built between the late 16th and early 17th centuries, it is dedicated to the Holy Spirit. It is a Renaissance-style building with a single nave and a porch on the façade. The year 1629 is inscribed on the bell tower, probably the year of completion of the church. Its ceiling is wooden covered with an arabesque fresco. The interior walls of the church are covered with Azulejos dating from the 17th century, and in its center remains a tombstone dating from 1681.

The calvary, "cruzeiro" in Portuguese, is located in front of the entrance to the Church of the Holy Spirit.

=== Civil and natural heritage ===
The Royal Palace, or Palácio da Caça, was a building present in the civil parish. Inês de Castro is said to have lived there. She is said to have conversed with Peter I there several times. The palace was then abandoned as early as the 16th century, leading to its disappearance in the 19th century.

The monument to the fighters of the Overseas War was erected to pay homage to the soldiers who participated in the Portuguese colonial wars. It lists all the soldiers of the municipality of Lourinhã and was inaugurated on 23 January 2005.

The washhouse, built in 1954 by the municipality of Lourinhã, is located at the exit of the parish, as is the water tower, built in the same year on the orders of Captain Simões Belo.

== Heraldry ==
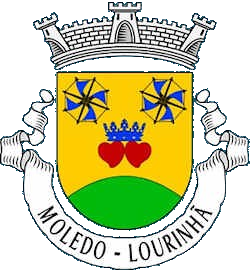

The coat of arms has several meanings:

- the frames of the windmills symbolize the rural character of the parish;
- the crown and hearts symbolize the love of Inês de Castro and Peter I: it is in the Palace of Moledo that they would have hidden their love;
- the mount represents the location of the parish in the Planalto da Cesareda.

The Portuguese Archaeologists' Association approved the elements of the coat of arms on 17 September 2002; they were registered by the General Directorate of Municipalities, No. 336/2002, on 20 November 2002, and officially published in the Diário da República, No. 261, III Series, on 12 November 2002.

== Bibliography ==
- Cipriano, Rui Marques (2001). Vamos falar da Lourinhã (in Portuguese). Câmara Municipal da Lourinhã. ISBN 9729500541.
- Costa Pinto, Filipe (2008). Enciclopédia das Festas Populares e Religiosas de Portugal - Volume 3 (in Portuguese). ISBN 9789892013930.
