= Nadrupe =

Coordinates: 39°14′N 9°17′W

Nadrupe is a village situated in the parish of Lourinhã, Portugal. As a village it is politically independent of its parish.

The agricultural zones of the village are separated by the main river Rio Grande, and are famous for their fertility, because the soil comes from the bed of the river, receiving new layers of sand and organic matter every year.

== History ==
Contrary to what many people think, the Nadrupe is not a recent village. Its origins go back to the 12th century, when Lourinhã was donated to his first owner D. Jordan, with French origins. The village appears first referenced in the letter given to charter Lourinhã in 1160, so that the village had same rights of the county seat. Later, the village appears in another document, when D. John III orders the first general census of the Portuguese population, in 1527. In the 20th century, the village was invaded by a surge of emigration. The flow of immigrants towards France was so great that Nadrupenses are now known as "The French".

== Heritage ==
=== Igreja de Nossa Senhora da Graça ===
Built in 1869 by the vote of the inhabitants of the village to Our Lady for this Tuesday rid of the epidemic of yellow fever, it is a very simple construction. The facade of beak, classic model, presents a window over the main door. The bell tower, on the left, has a door for the churchyard. In the works of 1989, were the half-walls of the ship and chapel lined with marble. In 2005 the church suffered a new restoration and the inclusion of a new chamber for burial ceremonies of the village.

=== Lavadouros ===
The tanks that serve this “lavadouro” (Where the woman Wash the clothes by hand) warrants were built by a benefactor of the village, Mr. Jose da Silva Junior who wanted allow better access to drinking water. For the first time, the water was seen as a common good in the villagers. Currently, there is a draft recovery of the space for leisure activities . The project is to keep the trace of the tanks and create a garden environment with multiple springs.

=== Fonte dos Poçinhos ===
The water of this spring was widely used for domestic lids. But with the arrival of the channelled water, fell into disuse. There is now a plan for the creation of an area of leisure.

=== Fonte de Nossa Senhora da Graça ===
This is by far the best-known spring of the village. It is associated with the myth that the Nossa Senhora da Graça (Our Lady of Grace) spared the Nadrupe of Yellow Fever, using the curative powers of its waters.

=== Legend ===
The legend says that during the Peninsular War, a French general named Nadrupe fell in love by the village, and when the French were expelled by the Portuguese-British troops, he refused to go, staying in the village and Being killed by them. Later, the population, gave his name to the village, in his honor. (Note that the village was already referred in the 12th century as Nadrupe, and the French invasions occurred in the 18th century).

== Climate ==
Nadrupe, as the entire county of Lourinhã, is characterized by high humidity (about 85%) due to the proximity of the sea, and high rainfall, which causes every year transhipment river. The temperatures vary little, remaining between 18 and 25 degrees. However, the past two years there have been negative temperatures and the occurrence of snow in the winter, and temperatures above 30 degrees Celsius in summer. Winds about 80 km / h are also very common.

== Economy ==
Its small size does not allow for a variety of activities. However, there are the three economic sectors in the village (Primary, Secondary and Tertiary).

Most inhabitants of Nadrupe is employed in the agricultural sector, dealing in most cases with fruit and vegetables. As part of the West region, the fruit "queen" is a Pera Rocha, almost exclusively exported to the United Kingdom. Related to agriculture are also the industries of canning and processing. As are examples of Louribatata and the Piklesfactory. However, the baking industry is also relevant. The tertiary sector is growing increasingly, are already based in the village several companies for the construction and transport.

== Culture ==
Currently, all cultural initiatives undertaken in Nadrupe included the direction of ADRCN (Sport Recreation and Cultural Association of Nadrupe), created by the residents for these and other purposes.

The event of greater relevance of the village is the August festival (held on the first Sunday of month, in honor of Our Lady of Grace). Linked to this festival, is also the tradition of the arc, which is the drafting of an arc with around 20m. This arc is decorated with murta Myrtus, lights and flowers and has always religious grounds. The whole arc is rebuilt every year.

Every year, on May 13 (day of Our Lady of Fatima), is held in the village the contest of gardens, who dispute among themselves the title of most beautiful garden of the village. They are common in the gardens Sardinheiras and seasonal plants such as lilies (Lilium) and the Jacintos (Hyacinthus). It is also the day which makes the Christian tradition of the procession of candles.

=== Gastronomy ===
Entries:

Stew of Gizzard;

Olives Stuffed with tomato;

Soups:

Cream of seafood soup;

Caldo verde; (A green broth soup made of potato will, strips of Portuguese cabbage and Slices of Portuguese sausage)

The Stone Soup;

Dishes:

Stew of eels;

Caldeirada à Nadrupe; (Stew with various kinds of fish, potatoes, tomatoes, onions, etc.)

Cod of Dolores; (Secret recipe)

Papas de Sarrabulho; (Stew of potatoes, heart, lungs and meat of the pig with sauce of blood)

Desserts:

Arrufada of coconut and chocolate; (Arrufada is a type of sweet bread)

Marble cake;

Soaked in orange;

After the meal a Bica is usual drunk. It is also customary to drink a tea (typically Lemon or Erva Cidreira, grown in the gardens of the houses).

== Curiosity ==
- Although it is common repetition of names in Portuguese villages, the village of Nadrupe is the only of his name in Portugal.
- The village had a Roman bridge that fell due to flooding of 90 decade.
- The entire village and the surrounding land within a radius of 1 km belonged to a single large property, the Quinta da Galeana. Today, with more than 300 years, the property account with only 35 Ha located on the village opposite bank of the river.
- In 2005 a skeleton of a dinosaur was found in the village, near the Quinta da Galeana.
