= Moita dos Ferreiros =

- Civil parish
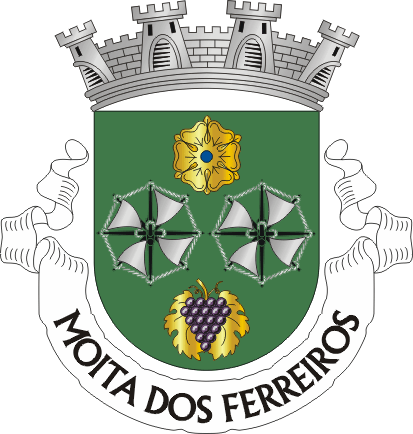
- Coat of arms

- Location in Portugal
- Coordinates: 39.248°N 9.223°W
- Country: Portugal
- Region: Oeste e Vale do Tejo
- Intermunic. comm.: Oeste
- District: Lisbon
- Municipality: Lourinhã

Area
  - Total: 24.83 km^{2} (9.59 sq mi)

Population (2011)
  - Total: 1,734
  - Density: 69.83/km^{2} (180.9/sq mi)
- Time zone: UTC+00:00 (WET)
  - Summer (DST): UTC+01:00 (WEST)

Moita dos Ferreiros is a civil parish in the municipality of Lourinhã, Portugal. The population in 2011 was 1,734, in an area of 24.83 km².
