= Gaeiras =

- Civil parish
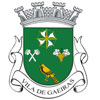
- Coat of arms

- Location in Portugal
- Coordinates: 39.374°N 9.128°W
- Country: Portugal
- Region: Oeste e Vale do Tejo
- Intermunic. comm.: Oeste
- District: Leiria
- Municipality: Óbidos

Area
  - Total: 10.31 km^{2} (3.98 sq mi)

Population (2011)
  - Total: 2,331
  - Density: 230/km^{2} (590/sq mi)
- Time zone: UTC+00:00 (WET)
  - Summer (DST): UTC+01:00 (WEST)

Gaeiras is a civil parish in the municipality of Óbidos, Portugal. The population in 2011 was 2,331, in an area of 10.31 km^{2}.
