= São Bartolomeu dos Galegos e Moledo =

- Civil parish
- Location in Portugal
- Coordinates: 39.276°N 9.279°W
- Country: Portugal
- Region: Oeste e Vale do Tejo
- Intermunic. comm.: Oeste
- District: Lisbon
- Municipality: Lourinhã

Area
  - Total: 20.10 km^{2} (7.76 sq mi)

Population (2011)
  - Total: 1,483
  - Density: 74/km^{2} (190/sq mi)
- Time zone: UTC+00:00 (WET)
  - Summer (DST): UTC+01:00 (WEST)

São Bartolomeu dos Galegos e Moledo is a civil parish in the municipality of Lourinhã, Portugal. It was formed in 2013 by the merger of the former parishes São Bartolomeu dos Galegos and Moledo. The population in 2011 was 1,483, in an area of 20.10 km².
