= Eburobrittium =

Coordinates: 39°21′49″N 9°08′25″W

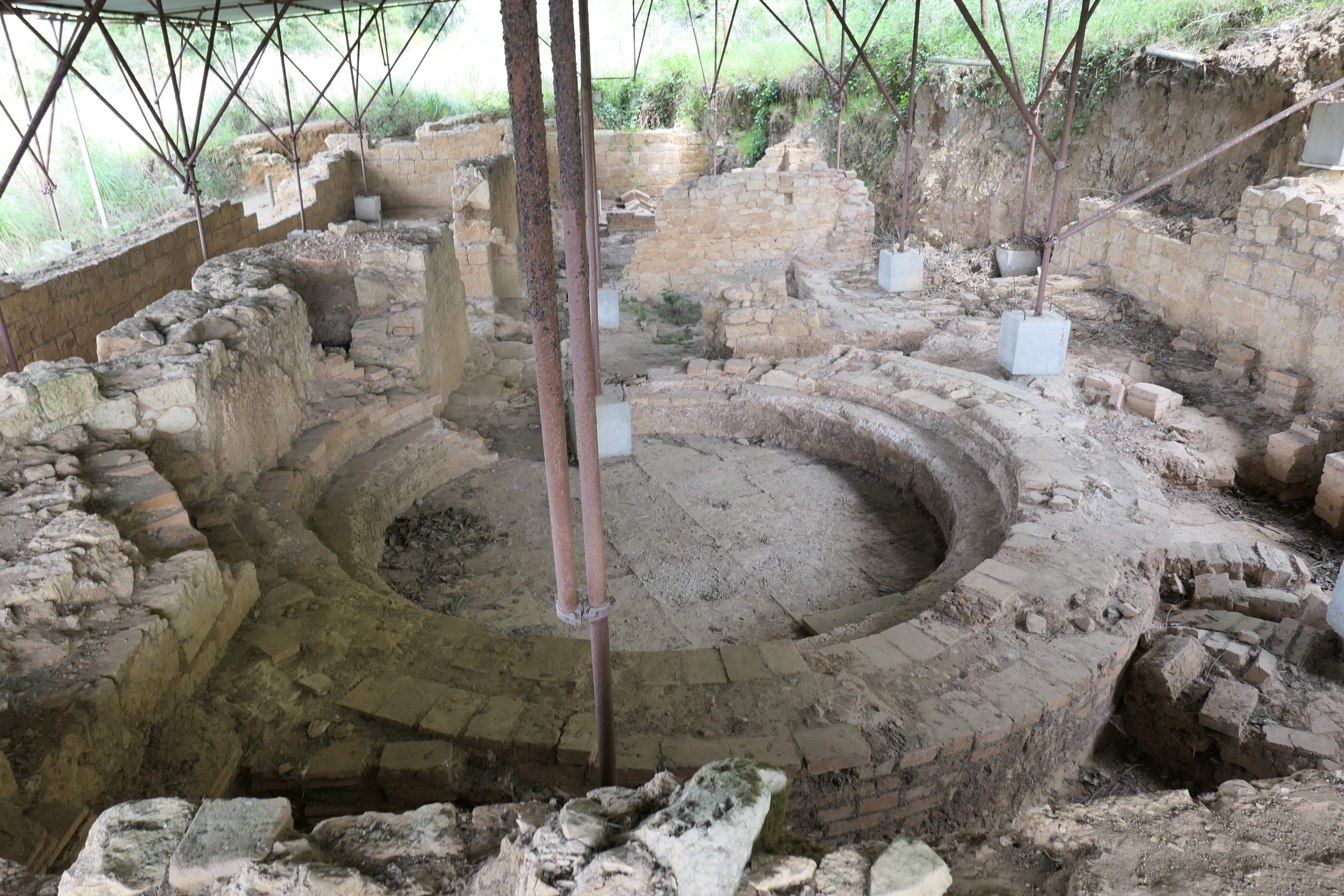
- Interactive map of Eburobrittium
- Type: Settlement
- Cultures: Roman
- Location: Óbidos, Portugal

History
- Built: 1st century BC - 5th century AD
- Abandoned: 5th century AD

Site notes
- Website: Patrimonio

Eburobrittium was a Roman town in Lusitania, located near the present town of Óbidos, Portugal.

The city was mentioned by Pliny the Elder as located between Collipo and Olisipo. The exact location was only determined by the discovery of archeological finds in the late 20th century. The city was located at the edge of a lagoon that, in Roman times, provided access to the ocean.

Eburobrittium was occupied from the 1st century BC to the second half of the 5th century AD. At that time it was abandoned in favour of the more defensible hill where Óbidos Castle is now located.
