= Olho Marinho =

- Civil parish
- Location in Portugal
- Coordinates: 39.329°N 9.232°W
- Country: Portugal
- Region: Oeste e Vale do Tejo
- Intermunic. comm.: Oeste
- District: Leiria
- Municipality: Óbidos

Area
  - Total: 18.12 km^{2} (7.00 sq mi)

Population (2011)
  - Total: 1,279
  - Density: 71/km^{2} (180/sq mi)
- Time zone: UTC+00:00 (WET)
  - Summer (DST): UTC+01:00 (WEST)

Olho Marinho is a Portuguese civil parish in the municipality of Óbidos. The population in 2011 was 1,279, in an area of 18.12 km².
