= Óbidos, Portugal =

Óbidos
- Municipality
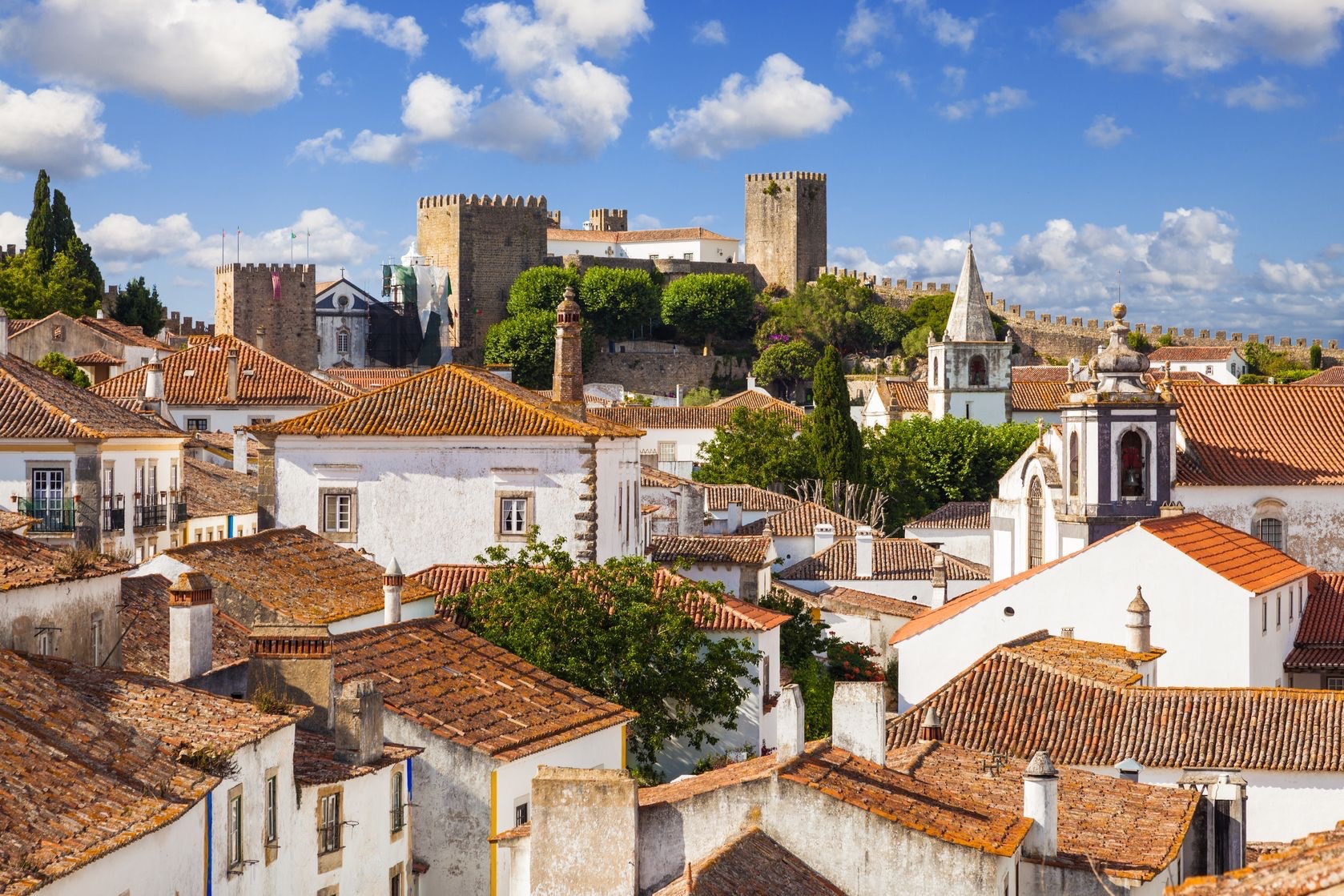
- A view of Óbidos

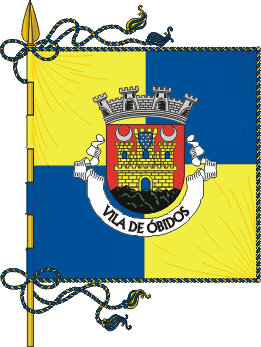
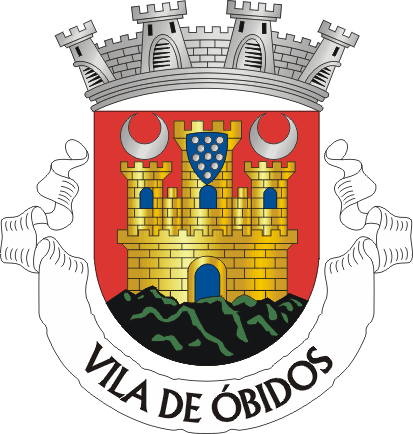
- Flag Coat of arms
- Interactive map of Óbidos
- Coordinates: 39°21′29″N 9°9′28″W
- Country: Portugal
- Region: Oeste e Vale do Tejo
- Intermunic. comm.: Oeste
- District: Leiria
- Parishes: 7

Government
  - President: Humberto da Silva Marques (PPD-PSD)

Area
  - Total: 141.55 km^{2} (54.65 sq mi)
- Elevation: 49 m (161 ft)
- Highest elevation: 221 m (725 ft)
- Lowest elevation: 0 m (0 ft)

Population (2015)
  - Total: 11,617
  - Density: 82.070/km^{2} (212.56/sq mi)
- Time zone: UTC+00:00 (WET)
  - Summer (DST): UTC+01:00 (WEST)
- Postal code: 2510
- Area code: 262
- Patron: Santa Maria
- Website: www.cm-obidos.pt

Óbidos (Portuguese pronunciation: [ˈɔβiðuʃ]; Proto-Celtic: *Eburobrittium) is a town and a municipality in the Oeste region, historical province of Estremadura and the Leiria district. The town proper has approximately 3,100 inhabitants. The municipality population in 2011 was 11,772 covering an area of 141.55 square kilometres (54.65 square miles).

== History ==
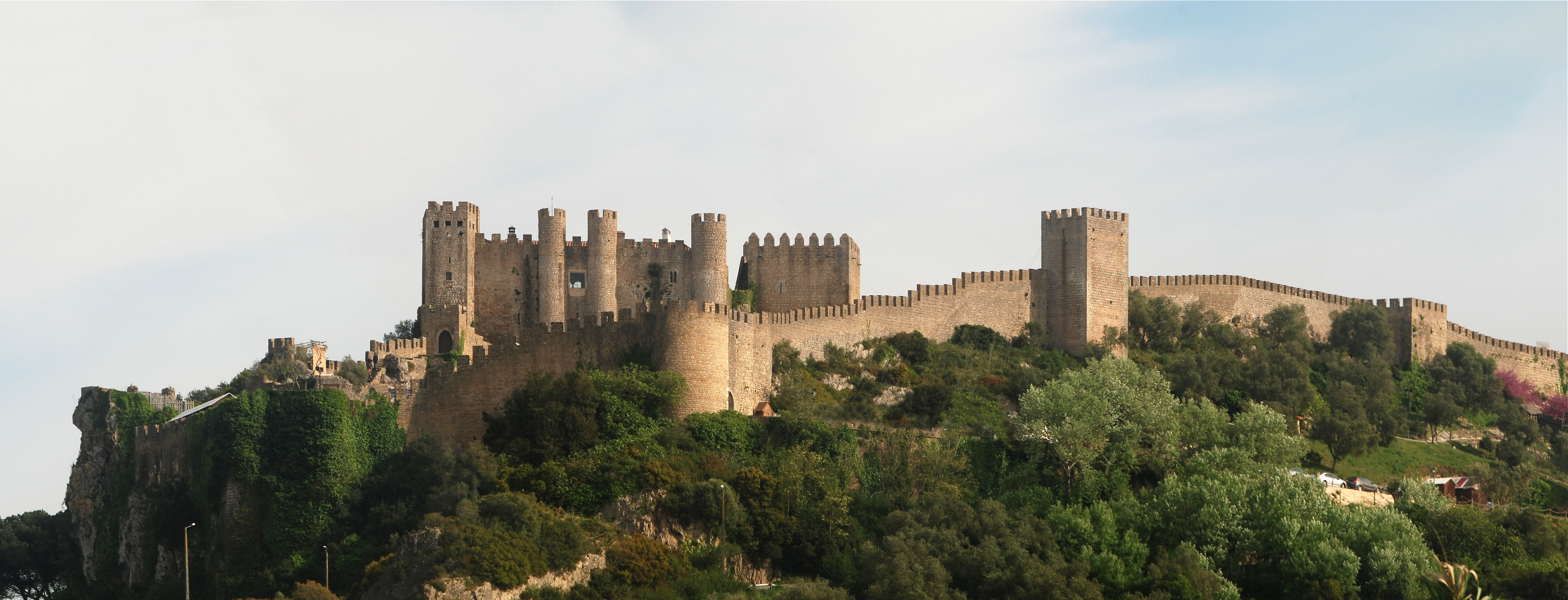
The castle and wall of Óbidos, view from the west.

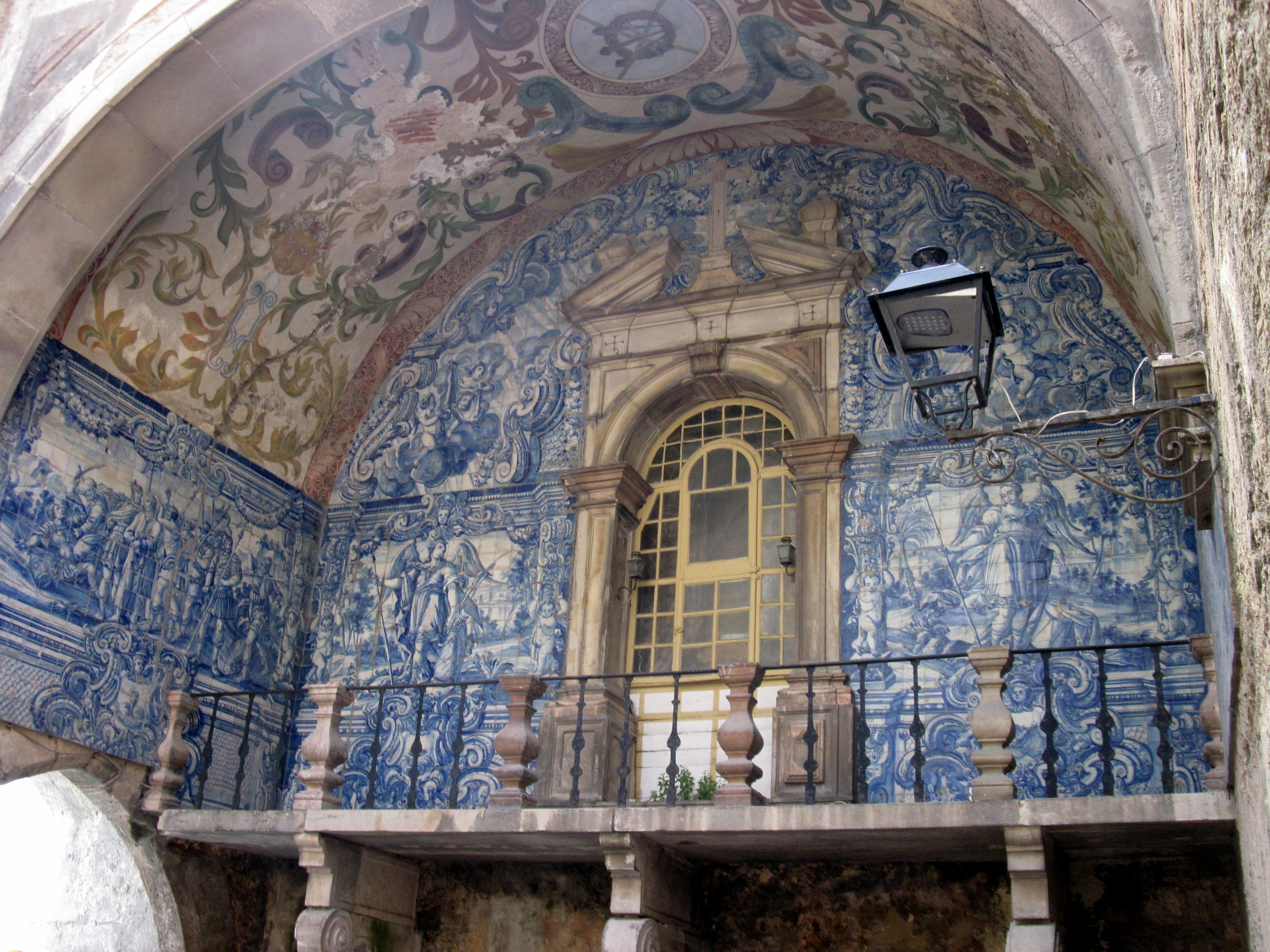
Azulejo in an Óbidos city gate

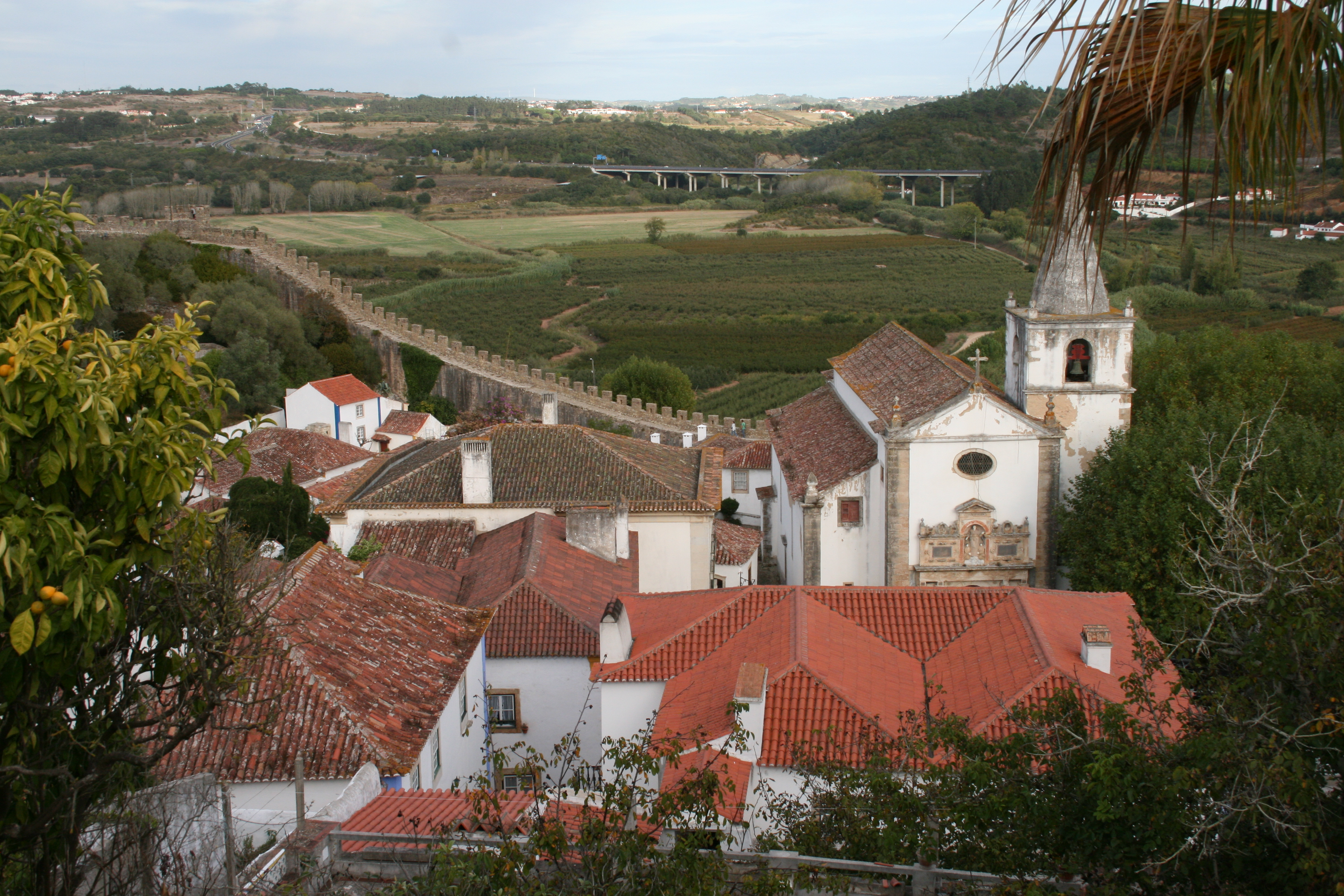
Top view of Santa Maria

The name "Óbidos" is a Latinised (oppidum, citadel) derivation of the older Celtic "Eburobricio". The municipality grew from a Roman settlement near the foothills of an elevated escarpment. The region of Óbidos, extending from the Atlantic to the interior of Estremadura Province along the rivers and lakes has been inhabited since the late Paleolithic. A settlement, constructed by early Celt tribes, was later a centre of trade for the Phoenicians. Archeological evidence from the base of the medieval tower (south of Facho) at Óbidos Castle indicates Roman construction linked to an outpost of the Roman civitas of Eburobrittium, a large urban area that has been under excavation. Archeological surveys determined the remains of a forum, baths and other Roman structures near the settlement.

After the fall of Rome, the region came under the influence of the Visigoths, although specific records are missing. The Roman town of Eburobrittium was abandoned in the 5th century for the more secure hilltop where today the principal settlement is located. Sometime after 713 the Moors established a fortification on this mountain, while a Christian community of Mozarabs lived in the Moncharro neighbourhood.

The city was taken from the Moors during the reign of the first King of Portugal, Afonso Henriques, in 1148. Tradition states that one knight, Gonçalo Mendes da Maia, was responsible for the successful storming of the Moorish castle. The retaking of Óbidos was the final stage in the conquest of the Estremadura Province region, after the settlements of Santarém, Lisbon and Torres Vedras. Following the control of the region, the settlement received its first foral (charter) in 1195, during the reign of King Sancho I. In 1210, King Afonso II gave the title of this village to Queen Urraca. Since then, Óbidos has often been patronized by the Queens of Portugal, giving rise to its informal title as Vila das Rainhas (English: town of the Queens); several royal consorts enriched the village with donations from the Middle Ages until the 16th century.

The castle and walls of Óbidos were remodelled during the reign of King Dinis I. The limestone and marble structure was strengthened and elaborated, while the keep was created in the 14th century, by King Fernando. By the time of the first remodelling project, the settlement had also grown beyond the gates of the castle.

The Church of Santa Maria in Óbidos was the setting for the wedding of King Afonso V to his cousin, Princess Isabella of Coimbra, on 15 August 1441, when they were both still children aged 9 and 10, respectively. Administrative reforms conducted by King Manuel I at Óbidos in 1513, included the institution of a formal charter and major requalification of the urban area.

The 1755 earthquake caused damage to the village walls, a few churches, and many buildings, and resulted in the loss of architecture of Arab and Medieval inspiration. Similarly, the Peninsular Wars were fought in the vicinity of Óbidos, including the Battle of Roliça. More recently, the village was a centre of government and meeting place for those involved in the 1974 Carnation Revolution, linking it to the armed forces movement revolt.

== Geography ==
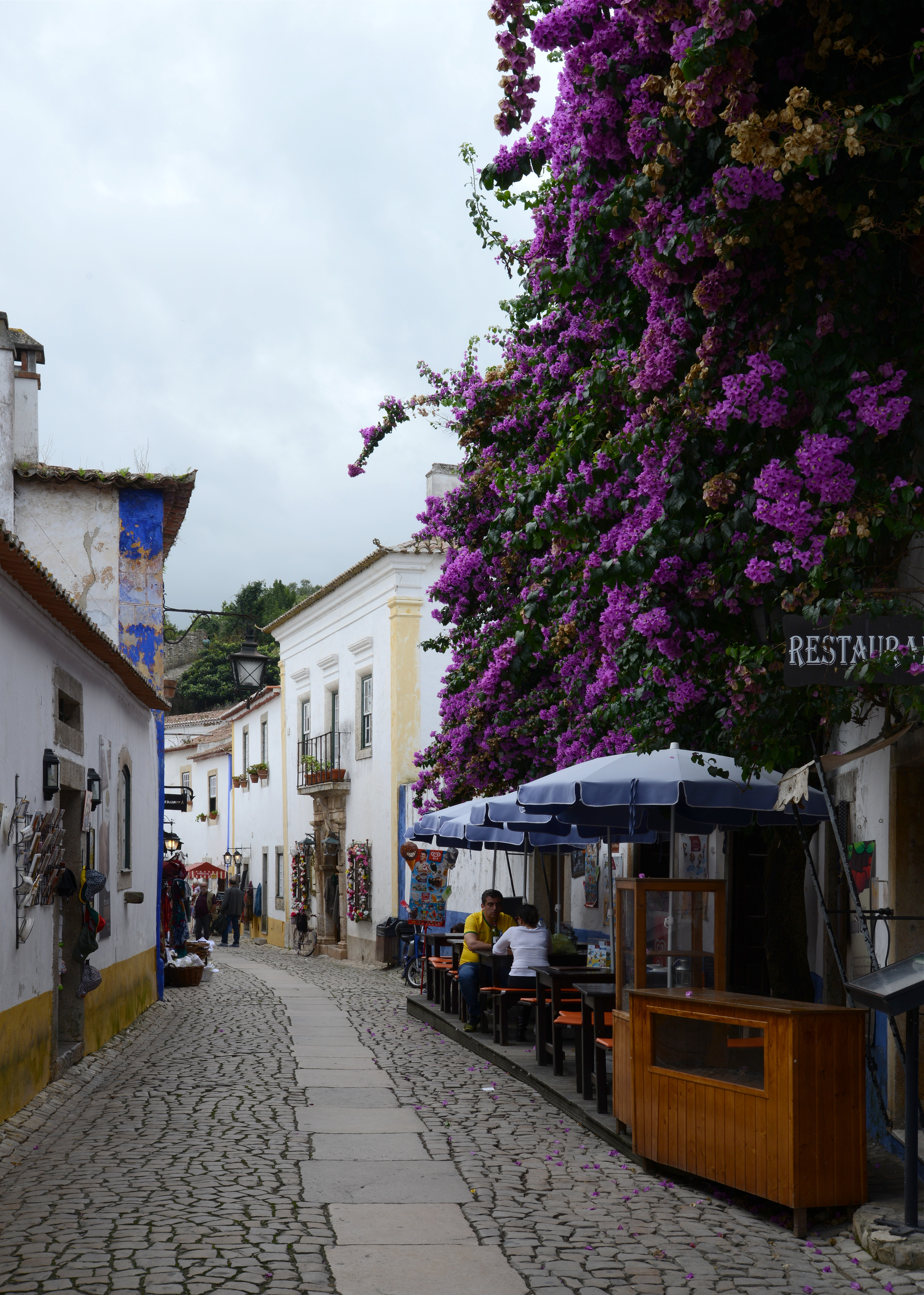
Main street of Óbidos

Located on the Atlantic Ocean coast, the municipality is bounded in the northeast and east by Caldas da Rainha, in the south by Bombarral, in the southwest by Lourinhã and the west by Peniche. Administratively, it is divided into 7 civil parishes (freguesias):

- A dos Negros
- Amoreira
- Gaeiras
- Olho Marinho
- Santa Maria, São Pedro e Sobral da Lagoa
- Usseira
- Vau

== Tourism ==
The area of the town of Óbidos is located on a hilltop, encircled by a fortified wall. Óbidos remains a well-preserved example of medieval architecture; its streets, squares, walls and its castle are popular tourist destinations. The castle now houses a pousada. The municipality is also home to the famous Praia d'El Rey golf complex, one of the top golf resorts in Europe.

Each July Óbidos castle hosts a traditional 'Medieval Market'. For two weeks the castle and the surrounding town recreate the spirit of medieval Europe.

In early March, Óbidos castle hosts the International Chocolate Festival.

=== Literature ===
Óbidos is also famous for its bookstores. There are 14 bookstores, one of which is in a church, another one, the Livraria do Mercado Biológico, sells fish as well as books.

In 2013, the town administration of Óbidos developed a municipal literature programme which included the creation of an international literary festival. Since its first edition in 2015, the Fólio (Festival Literário Internacional de Óbidos) takes places every year in October.

In 2015, the UNESCO recognized Óbidos as the City of Literature.

== Notable people ==
- Baltazar Gomes Figueira (1604–1674), a painter
- Josefa de Óbidos (1630–1684), a painter
- Miguel da Natividade (1630–1690), a composer
- Armando da Silva Carvalho (1938–2017), a writer
- Carlos Zorrinho (born 1959) a politician, university professor and Member of the European Parliament

== See also ==
- Óbidos IPR
