= Lourinhã =

- Municipality
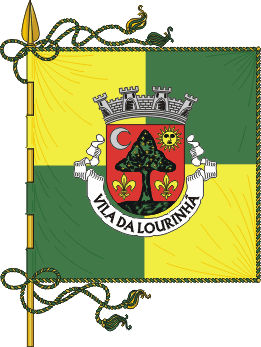
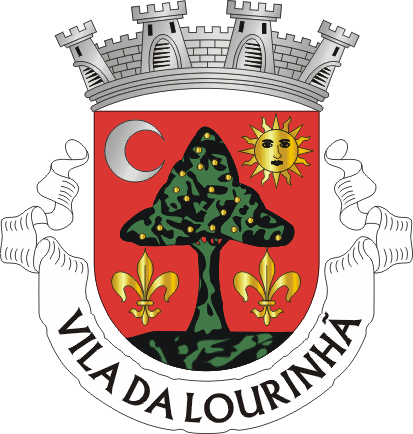
- Flag Coat of arms
- Interactive map of Lourinhã
- Location in Portugal
- Coordinates: 39°14′N 9°18′W
- Country: Portugal
- Region: Oeste e Vale do Tejo
- Intermunic. comm.: Oeste
- District: Lisbon
- Parishes: 8

Government
  - President: João Duarte (PS)

Area
  - Total: 147.17 km^{2} (56.82 sq mi)

Population (2011)
  - Total: 25,735
  - Density: 174.87/km^{2} (452.90/sq mi)
- Time zone: UTC+00:00 (WET)
  - Summer (DST): UTC+01:00 (WEST)
- Local holiday: Saint John; June 24
- Website: www.cm-lourinha.pt

Lourinhã (locally [loɾiˈɲɐ̃]) is a municipality in the historical Estremadura province, in the District of Lisbon and in the Portuguese Oeste region. The population in 2011 was 25,735, in an area of 147.17 km^{2}. The seat of the municipality is the town of Lourinhã, with a population of 8,800 inhabitants.

The present Mayor is João Duarte, elected by the Socialist Party.

== History ==
The name Lourinhã possibly originated in the period of Roman domination, when a villa was located in the area. The origin of the medieval village is linked to Jordan, a French knight who took part in the successful Siege of Lisbon in 1147. King Afonso Henriques granted Jordan the region of Lourinhã as fief and allowed him to grant a foral (letter of feudal rights) to its settlers in 1160. The name Lourinhã may be related to the origin of its feudal lord, since Jordan was from the Loire region in France.

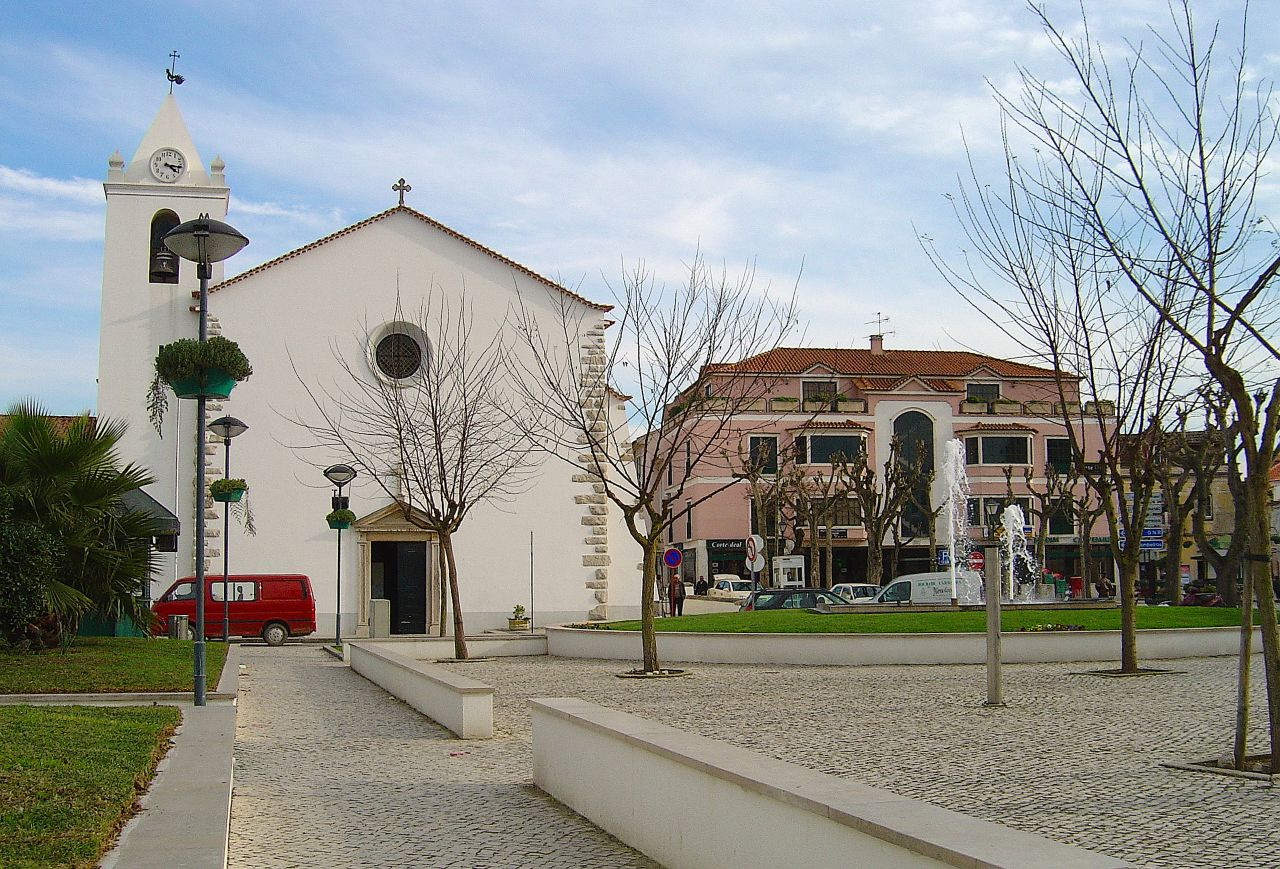
Santo António Convent Church in Lourinhã.

The rights of Lourinhã were confirmed by letters of King Sancho I in 1218 and again by Afonso III in 1258. The parish of Lourinhã became one of the richest of the Lisbon Diocese, as reflected by its main church, a fine example of 14th-century Portuguese Gothic architecture. The Gothic works of the main church were sponsored by Lourenço Vicente, a Lourinhã-born Archbishop of Braga who received the village as a donation of King John I in 1384.

In the 16th century, the Franciscan monastery of Santo António (1598) and a Misericórdia Church and Charity (1586) were founded in Lourinhã. The Misericórdia (Mercy), a religious charity, now houses a museum with outstanding Renaissance paintings. The most important paintings are by the hand of a mysterious early 16th-century painter, dubbed the Master of Lourinhã (Mestre da Lourinhã).

Starting at the end of the 19th century, the infrastructure of the municipality was modernised with roads, canalised water and electric light, as well as improvements in the educational system. The economy depended mostly on agriculture and fishing. Tourism is an increasingly important source of revenue, due to the municipality's extensive, picturesque beaches and, more recently, by the paleontological remains from the eponymous Lourinhã Formation, which include fossilised bones, footprints, eggs and even embryos from Jurassic dinosaurs. Many of which can be seen nowadays at the local museum, Museu da Lourinhã.

Lourinhã, is one of the few brandy-making areas, besides Cognac, Armagnac and Jerez, that have received appellation status.

== Civil parishes ==
Administratively, the municipality is divided into 8 civil parishes (freguesias):

- Lourinhã e Atalaia
- Miragaia e Marteleira
- Moita dos Ferreiros
- Reguengo Grande
- Ribamar
- Santa Bárbara
- São Bartolomeu dos Galegos e Moledo
- Vimeiro

== Climate ==
Lourinhã has a Mediterranean climate with warm, dry summers and mild, wet winters. Temperatures are never too hot nor too cold.

Climate data for Vimeiro, Lourinhã, 1964-1990, altitude: 10 m (33 ft)
Month	Jan	Feb	Mar	Apr	May	Jun	Jul	Aug	Sep	Oct	Nov	Dec	Year
Mean daily maximum °C (°F)	15.2 (59.4)	15.6 (60.1)	16.7 (62.1)	17.6 (63.7)	19.0 (66.2)	21.7 (71.1)	23.2 (73.8)	23.7 (74.7)	23.8 (74.8)	21.5 (70.7)	18.1 (64.6)	15.7 (60.3)	19.3 (66.8)
Daily mean °C (°F)	10.5 (50.9)	11.4 (52.5)	12.3 (54.1)	13.5 (56.3)	15.2 (59.4)	17.6 (63.7)	19.2 (66.6)	19.5 (67.1)	18.8 (65.8)	16.6 (61.9)	13.2 (55.8)	11.0 (51.8)	14.9 (58.8)
Mean daily minimum °C (°F)	5.8 (42.4)	7.2 (45.0)	7.8 (46.0)	9.4 (48.9)	11.3 (52.3)	13.6 (56.5)	15.2 (59.4)	15.2 (59.4)	13.8 (56.8)	12.4 (54.3)	8.3 (46.9)	6.3 (43.3)	10.5 (50.9)
Average rainfall mm (inches)	90.0 (3.54)	67.1 (2.64)	49.3 (1.94)	64.3 (2.53)	48.3 (1.90)	17.5 (0.69)	6.3 (0.25)	8.0 (0.31)	28.7 (1.13)	91.6 (3.61)	104.3 (4.11)	95.2 (3.75)	670.6 (26.4)
Average relative humidity (%)	84	80	76	76	77	77	77	80	81	82	82	84	80
Source 1: Instituto de Meteorologia
Source 2: Portuguese Environment Agency (precipitation 1984-2020)

== Population ==
Population of Lourinhã municipality (1801 – 2011)
1801	1849	1900	1930	1960	1981	1991	2001	2011
3366	6481	12154	17049	22927	21245	21596	23265	25735

== Beaches ==
Lourinhã has 12 km of coastline with several popular beaches.

- Praia de Areal
- Praia da Areia Branca
- Praia do Caniçal
- Praia de Paimogo
- Praia de Vale Frades
- Praia de Porto das Barcas
- Praia da Peralta

== Paleontology ==
The area of Lourinhã is known by the Late Jurassic findings of dinosaurs and other fossils, and give the name for Lourinhã Formation. The Museu da Lourinhã holds the main dinosaur collection.

== Notable people ==
- Ana Jorge (born 1949) a pediatrician and a Portuguese politician
- Nuno Brás (born 1963) Bishop of Madeira
- Fernando Alexandre (born 1985) a Portuguese former footballer with 307 club caps

== See also ==
- Moledo
- Nadrupe, a village situated in the parish of Lourinhã
